= Upper Mokotów =

Area in Warsaw, Poland

- Neighbourhood
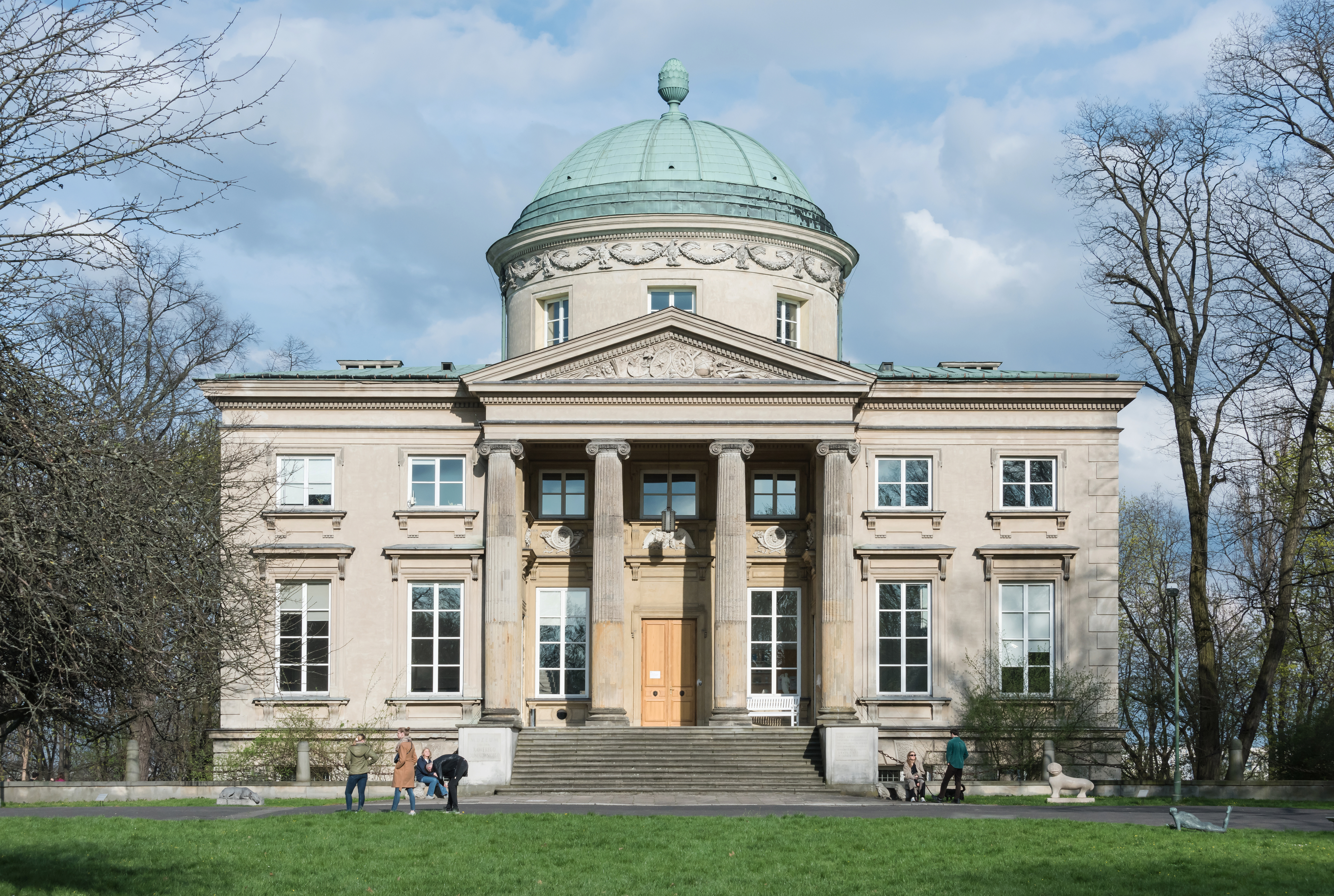
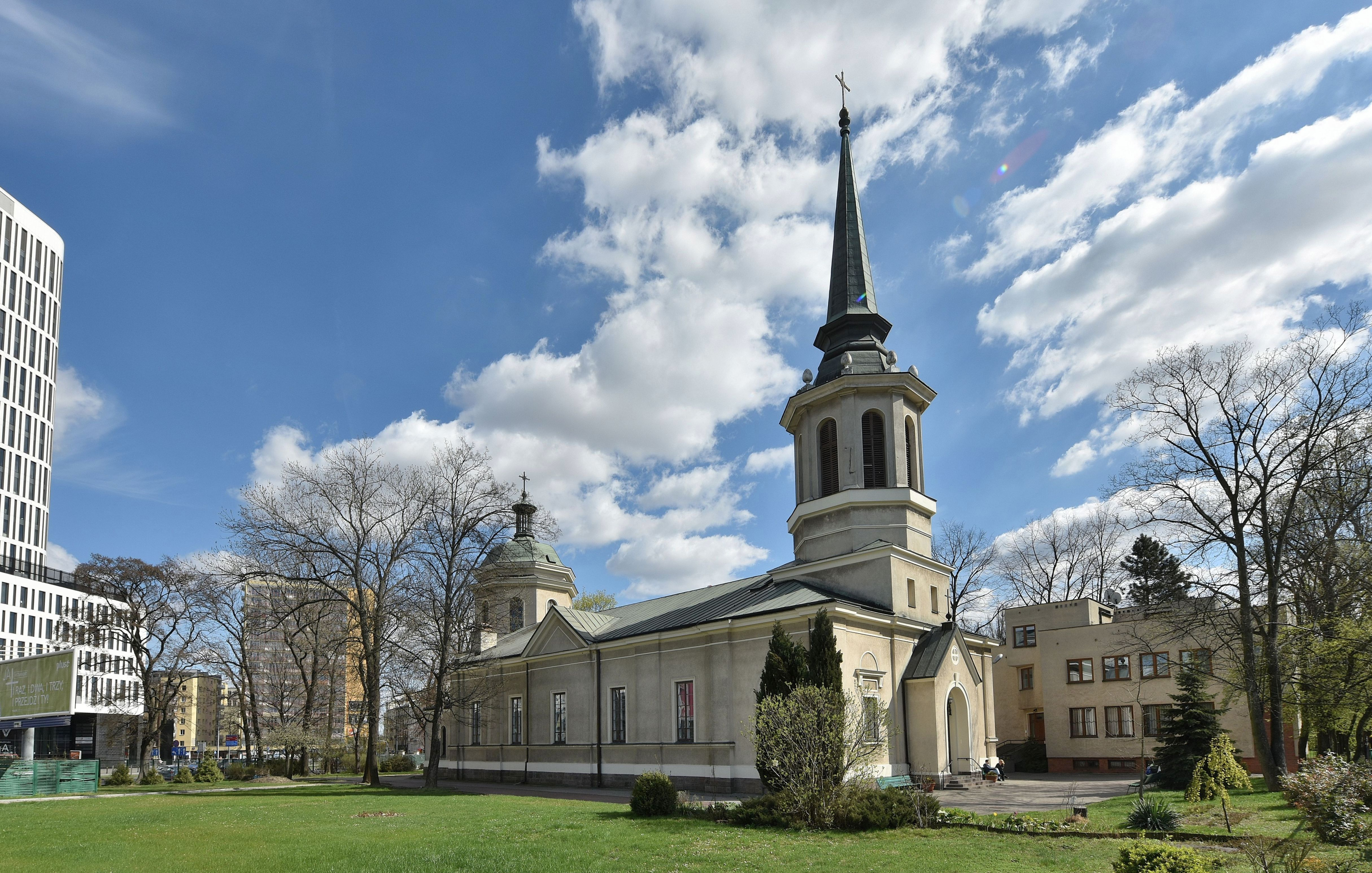
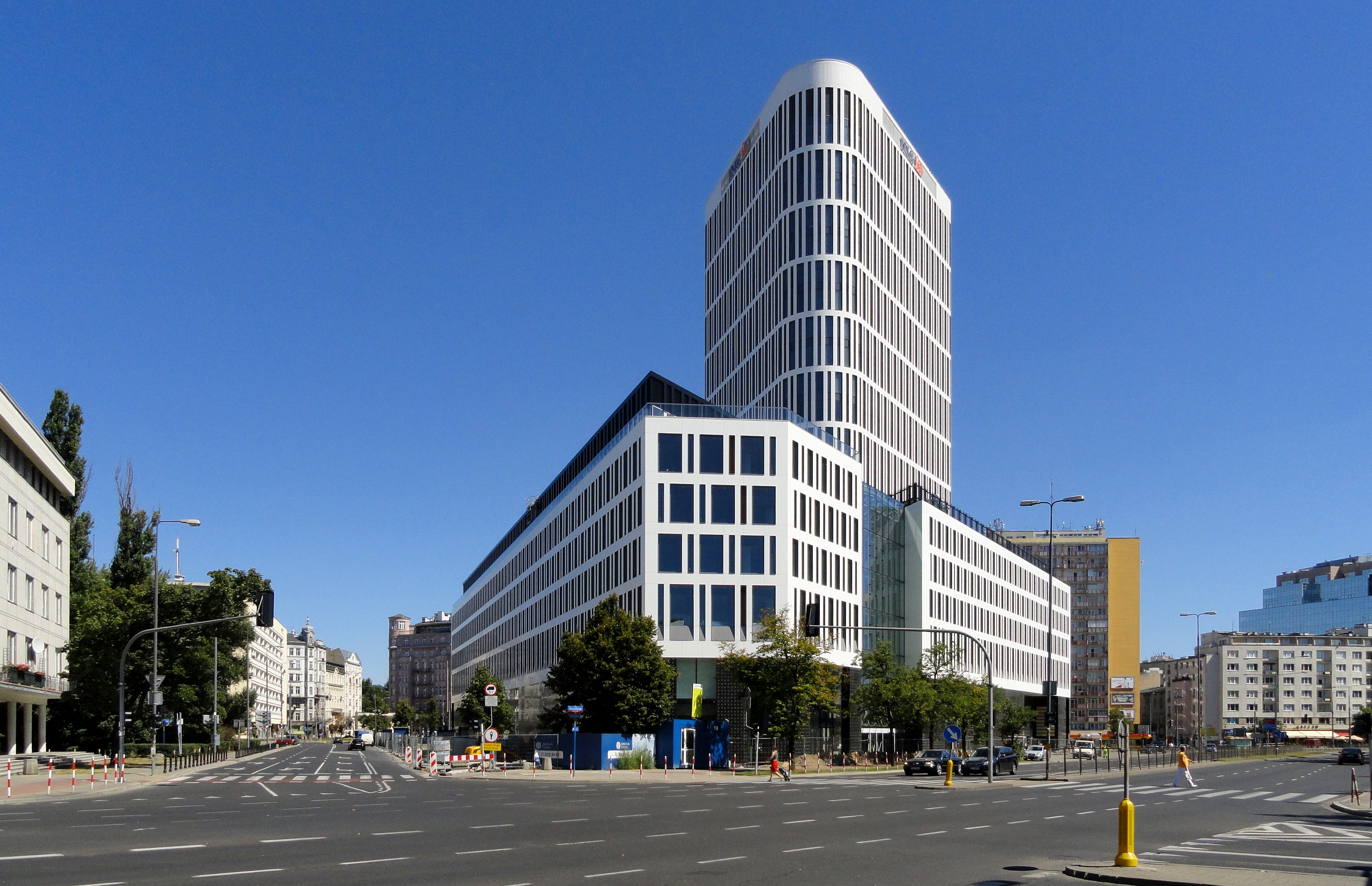
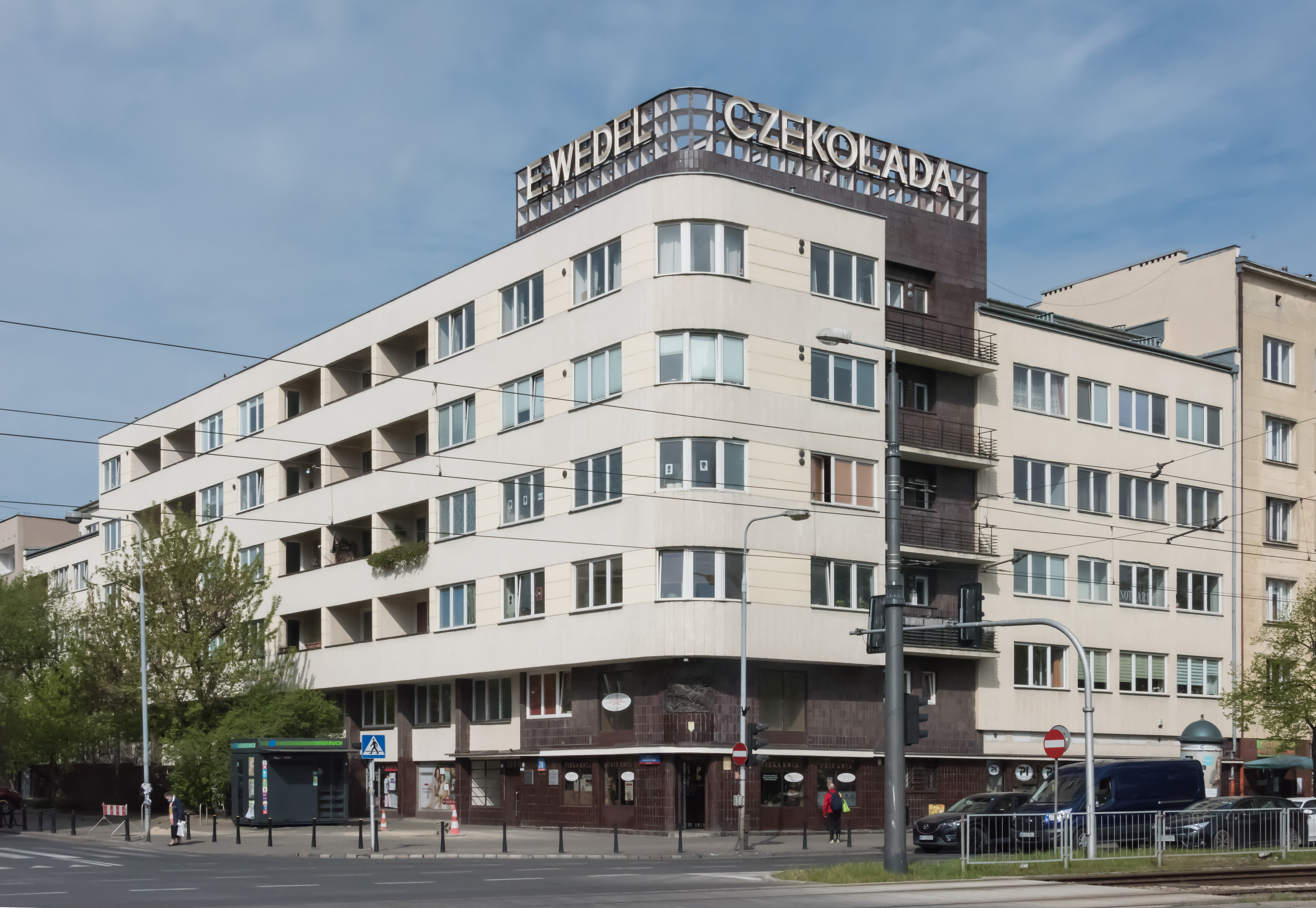
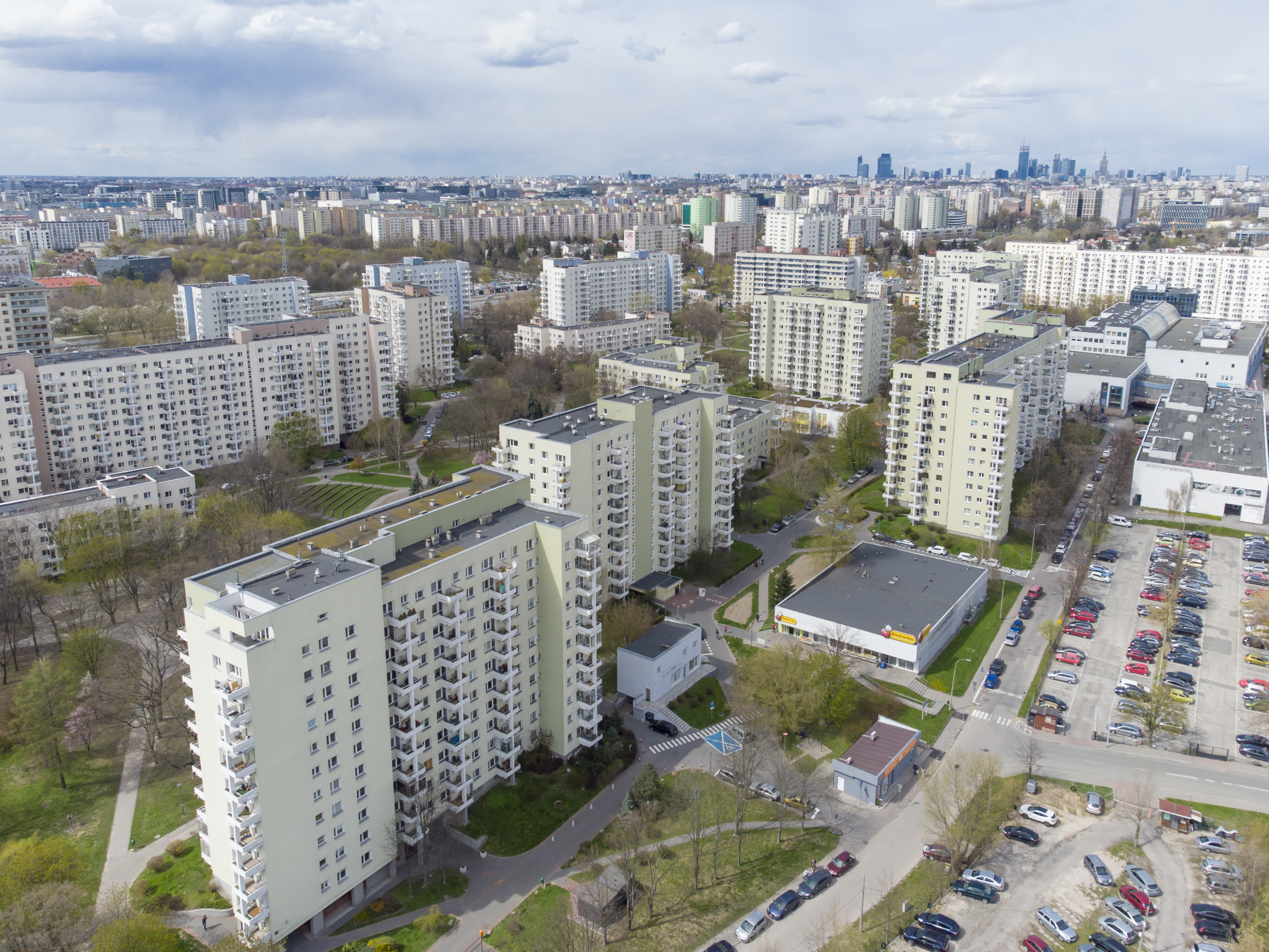
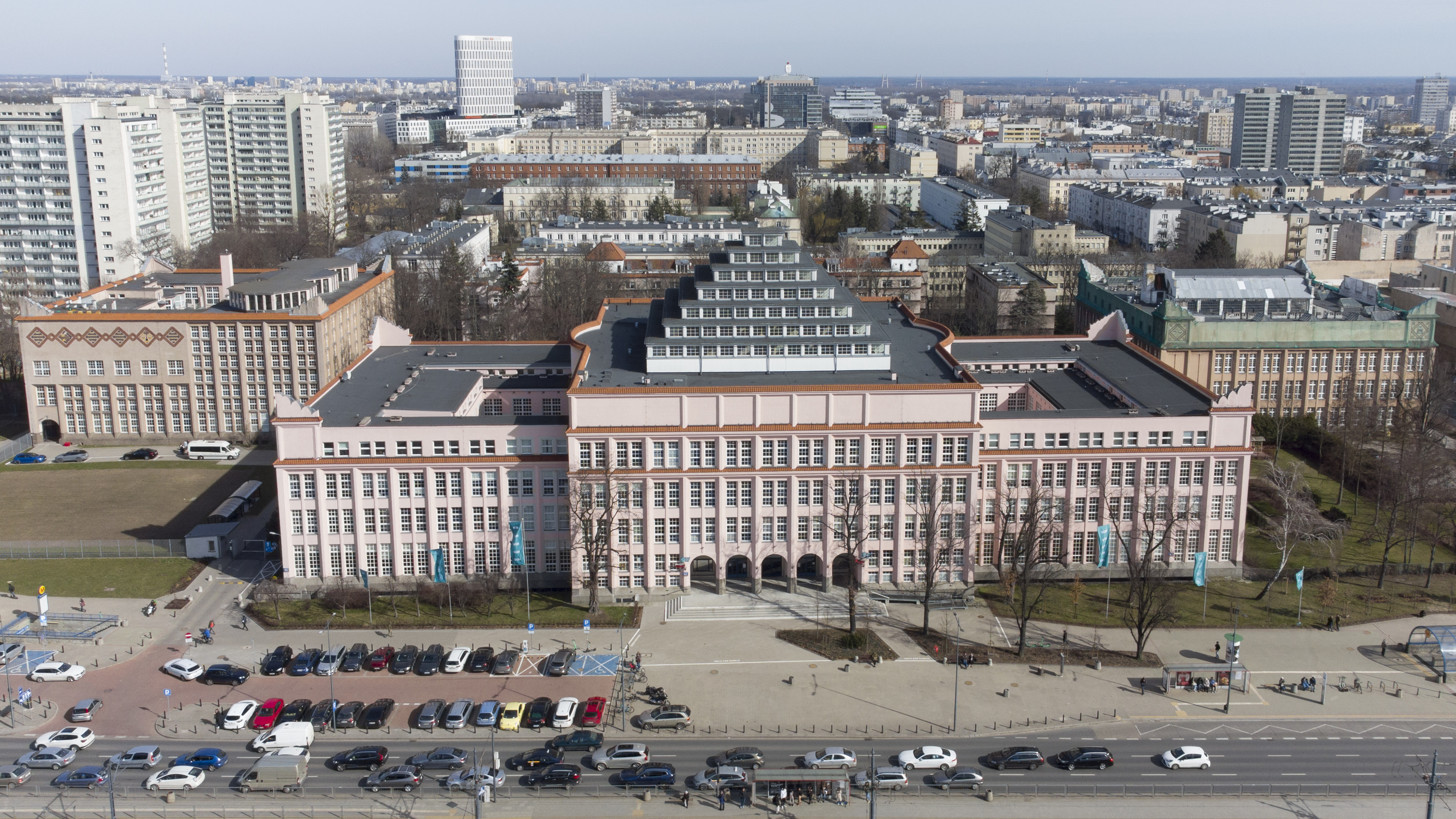
- Rabbit House Church of the Ascension of the Lord Plac Unii Wedel House Apartment buildings in Służew SGH Warsaw School of Economics
- Interactive map of Upper Mokotów
- Coordinates: 52°11′23″N 21°00′26″E
- Country: Poland
- Voivodeship: Masovian
- City and county: Warsaw
- District: Mokotów
- Time zone: UTC+1 (CET)
  - Summer (DST): UTC+2 (CEST)
- Area code: +48 22

Upper Mokotów (Polish: Górny Mokotów, [ˈɡur.nɘ̟ mɔˈkɔ.tuf]) is an area in the city of Warsaw, Poland, forming the western side of the Mokotów district. It contains six out of its twelve City Information System areas, which are: Ksawerów, Old Mokotów, Służew, Służewiec, Wierzbno, and Wyględów. Upper Mokotów is a residential area which predominantly consists of mid- and high-rise housing estates with apartment buildings, with lesser presence of low-rise single-family housing. A portion in its central west also constitutes a financial district with office buildings, known colloquially as Mordor. Lower Mokotów constitutes the other side of the district.

Among the historical structures, the area includes several neoclassical buildings, such as the Rabbit House built in 1786, the Mokotów Tollhouses built in 1818, the Ksawerów Manor House built in 1840, and the Fanshawe Palace from around 1850. It also includes the Szuster Palace, a Gothic Revival palace built in 1774, and the Church of the Ascension of the Lord, a Lutheran eclectic temple built in 1904. Upper Mokotów also features cultural institutions, including the Geological Museum of the State Institute of Geology, the Museum of the Cursed Soldiers and the Political Prisoners of the Polish People's Republic, and Xawery Dunikowski Museum of Sculpture, as well as several theatres, and the Iluzjon arthouse cinema. It also has campuses of the Łazarski University, the SGH Warsaw School of Economics, and the Warsaw University of Technology, as well as research institutions, such as the Institute of Physics of the Polish Academy of Sciences. Furthermore, the State Medical Institute of the Ministry of Interior and Administration, one of the most prominent hospitals and medical research institutions in Poland, is also present in the area. Upper Mokotów also has several public parks, including Arcadia Park, Dreszer Park, Eye of the Sea Park, and Służew Little Valley Park. It also features Plac Unii, a 90-metre-tall (295.28 ft) modernist office building and shopping centre, and Westfield Mokotów, one of the largest shopping malls in the city. The area is served by the M1 line of the Warsaw Metro underground rapid transit system, with the stations of Pole Mokotowskie, Racławicka, Służew, Wierzbno, and Wilanowska.

By the 13th century, the village of Służew was present in the area, forming a small farming community. In 1238, the St. Catherine Church was founded there, with its Roman Catholic parish becoming the oldest within the current boundaries of Warsaw. It was later rebuilt in the 19th century. In the 14th century, the villages of Mokotów and Służewiec were also recorded nearby, both later being granted the Kulm law privileges. The village of Szopy was also founded in the following century. The area was raided and devastated by the Swedish Imperial Army in 1656 during and following the siege of Warsaw in the Second Northern War. By the 16th century, the settlement of Wyględowo-Kościesze, the predecessor of the modern neighbourhood of Wyględów, was recorded in the area. In the 18th century Mokotów came to prosperity with the development of numerous manor houses, villas, and palaces for wealthy landowners and townspeople. The area was demolished and plundered by the soldiers of the Imperial Russian Army during the Kościuszko Uprising in 1794, and began to rebuild in the 1810s. In the 1770s, the hamlet of Wierzbno was founded to the south of the village Mokotów, with the hamlets of Henryków, Ksawerów, and Królikarnia also developing in the area in the 19th century. The same century, Mokotów and Wierzbno became popular holiday villages. On 13 January 1867, the village of Mokotów became the seat of government of the eponymous rural municipality of Mokotów. In the 1880s, several sets of fortifications of the Imperial Russian Army were developed across Upper Mokotów, being later decommissioned and partially demolished in the 1910s. In the 1890s, the narrow-gauge railway tracks were constructed crossing Upper Mokotów, being operated by the Grójec Commuter Railway and the Wilanów Railway, and operating until 1969.

At the turn of the 20th century, and continuing until the Second World War, the area of Mokotów and Wierzbno begun to develop into a suburbia of Warsaw with the construction of numerous tenements. On 8 April 1916, the municipality of Mokotów, which constituted most of Upper Mokotów, was incorporated into the city of Warsaw. In 1910, the Mokotów Aerodrome was established to the north of the village, featuring dirt runways. It became the city's first aerodrome and operated until 1947. In 1932, the neighbourhood of villas, known as Służew-Parcele, was developed to the northwest of Służew, and together with Służewiec, was incorporated into Warsaw in 1938. During the Warsaw Uprising in the Second World War, the German officers conducted a series of executions on local population, and displaced thousands of the residents from the area, with its large portions being devastated and destroyed during the Warsaw Uprising, and in its aftermath in the planned destruction of the city, especially affecting Ksawerów, Old Mokotów, Służewiec, and Wierzbno. After the conflict, the area of Służewiec was re-developed as a major industrial district in the 1950s, known as Służewiec Przemysłowy (Industrial Służewiec). The first major residential developments after the war included the construction of a housing estate of apartament buildings in Old Mokotów between 1947 and 1952, developed by the Warsaw Housing Cooperative. Later, between the 1950s and the 1970s, a series of major housing estates, predominantly consisting of pre-fabricated apartment buildings, were developed across Upper Mokotów, including in Ksawerów, Old Mokotów, Służew, Wierzbno, and Wyględów. In the 1990s, the industrial area in Służewiec was transformed into the largest financial district in Poland, colloquially referred to as Mordor. After 2019, the rented office spaces in the area began to decline, as it converted into a residential district. In the 1995, the M1 line of the Warsaw Metro was opened crossing Upper Mokotów.

== Toponymy ==
The name Mokotów most likely comes from the name of its former owner Mokot or Mokoto, which with addition of the suffix -ów, translates to Mokot's place. A hypothesis proposes the person's name originates from a Middle High German word mocke, meaning "clumsy" and "uneducated". Originally used for the village, now in the neighbourhood of Old Mokotów, it became a name of the city district of Mokotów. It is traditionally divided into two areas, Upper Mokotów in the west, and Lower Mokotów in the east, divided by the peaks of the Warsaw Escarpment.

== History ==
=== Prehistory ===
The signs of human settlements from the Stone Age (4000 BCE and 2000 BCE), Bronze Age (3300 BCE to 1200 BCE), and of the Lusatian culture (1300 BCE to 500 BCE) have been found in the area of Warsaw Escarpment and Służewiec Stream. Additionally, several hoes made from animal horns from the Linear Pottery culture, dating to around 2500 BCE, were discovered near Sobieskiego Street, within the area of the modern neighbourhood of Old Mokotów.

=== Middle Ages ===
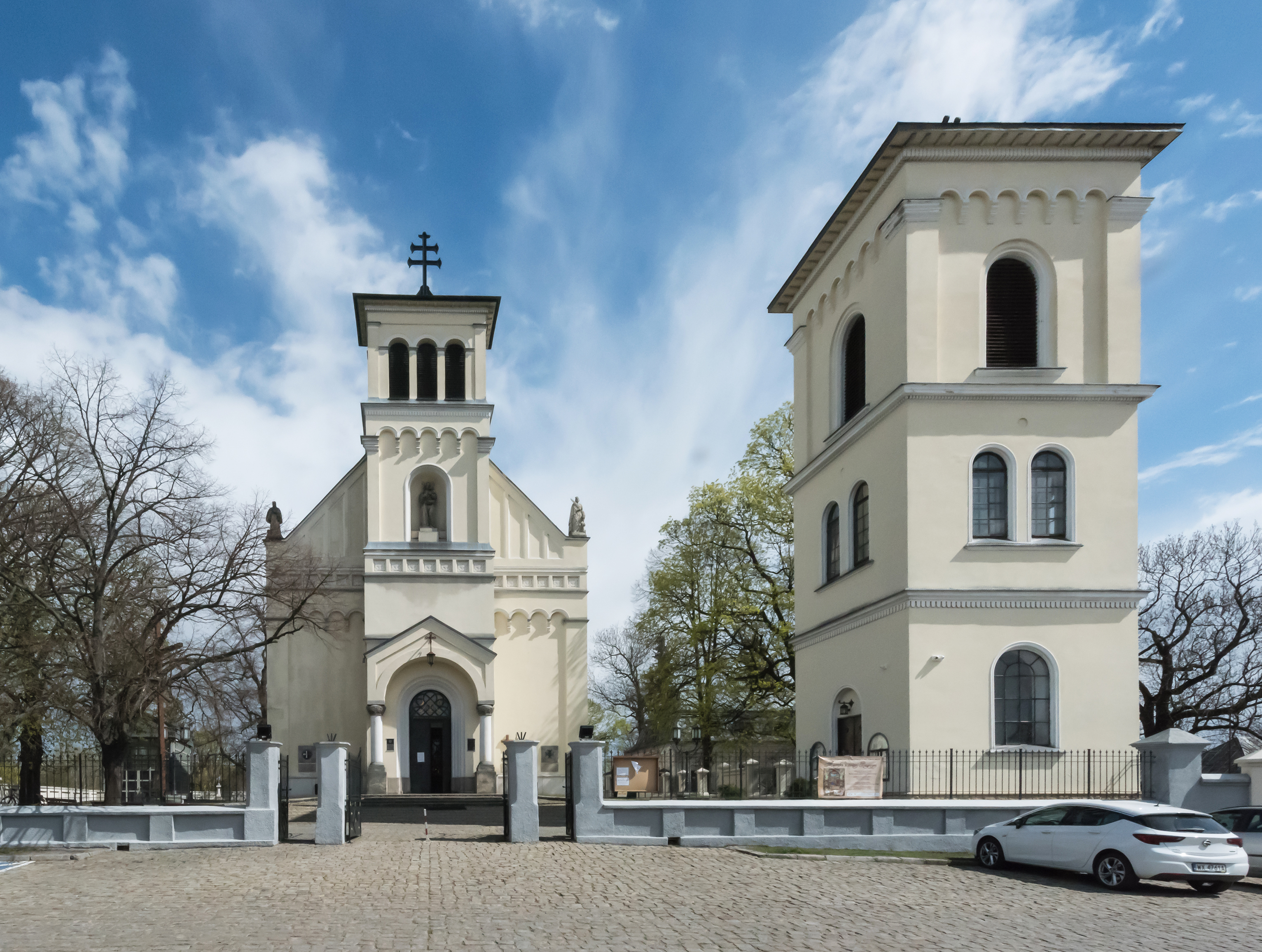
The St. Catherine Church in Służew, dating to 1848. Its parish was established in 1238 as the first within modern Warsaw. The building is currently located within the Ursynów district.

By 1065, the area of Służew was inhabited by the Roman Catholic monks of the Order of Saint Benedict, who founded there their missionary centre. In 1238, the Roman Catholic Parish of St. Catherine was founded by duke Konrad I of Masovia, ruler of the Duchy of Masovia, and erected by bishop Paweł II of Bnin. It is the oldest parish within modern boundaries of Warsaw. At the same time, the Służew Old Cemetery was also founded nearby. Archaeological findings suggest that before that, it was a place of worship of Slavic pagans, with signs of fire burning constantly for several hundred years. It is unknown what the first church built there looked like. In the 13th century, a wooden church was built in its place, and was later replaced with a brick structure in the 16th century. Currently, both the church and the cemetery are located within the Ursynów district.

By 1238, the village of Służew (until the 16th century known as Służewo), was placed near Sadurka stream, and owned by the Roman Catholic Order of Canon Regulars of St. Augustin from Czerwińsk nad Wisłą. In 1240, it was acquired by duke Konrad I of Masovia, who then gifted it to his knight and count, Gotard of Służew, on 27 April 1245. His descendants formed the Służewiecki family of the Radwan heraldic clan, which owned this land until the 17th century. The village came into prosperity in the 16th century thanks to selling its grain to Gdańsk. By 1378, the village of Służewiec was also present in the area, being settled alongside the Sadurka stream. It formed a part of the agricultural estate of Służew.

By 1367, the village of Mokotów (until the 16th century known as Mokotowo) was also recorded near a road connecting Warsaw and Czersk. It was a small farming community paying tithe to the town of Zegrze. Its farmlands stretched approximately between current Mokotowska, Polna, Rakowiecka, Odyńca, Żwirki i Wigury, Piaseczyńska, Sobieskiego, and Belwederska Streets, while the village centre was probably originally placed in the area of Boryszewska and Dolna Streets and the Eye of the Sea pond. Some documents from the 15th century suggest that a nearby settlement in modern Wierzbno might have been deserted and incorporated into Mokotów. Probably after the agricultural reform in the 14th century, or even prior to that, Mokotów was granted the Kulm law privileges, and became property of the Duke of Masovia. Its farmlands were managed in the three-field system. The village sold its produce to Jazdów, and after it was destroyed in a 1262 raid by Lithuanians, it switched to serve Warsaw instead. It led to several farmers of Mokotów growing small fortunes, some even having residences on the outskirts of the city, at Senatorska and Długa Streets. In the 13th century, the farmlands of the village had an area of 25 Chełmno voloks, or 420 hectares. It paid a lease of 28 groschen, an equivalent of a bushel of wheat flour or a wheelcart of hay, similar to other villages belonging to the Duke of Masovia. Additionally, each volok of its farmland was taxed with 13 bushels of rye, and customary tributes in the form of 2 capons, one goose and 30 eggs. Three voloks belonged respectively to the advocate, the vicars of the St. John Archcathedral in Warsaw, and merchant Jerzy Baryczka.

In 1411, Służewiec was also granted the Kulm law privileges by duke Janusz I the Old, ruler of the Duchy of Warsaw. By 1456, the village of Szopy was recorded in the area to the west of the Warsaw Escarpment near the road connecting Warsaw with Puławy, now forming Puławska Street.

=== Early modern period ===
By the early 16th century, the village of Wyględowo-Kościesze, later known as Wyględów, was recorded in the area of the current Bełska Street. It was formed from two settlements, Wyględowo, and Kościesze, with the later being originally a part of the village of Rakowiec.

In 1611, the village of Mokotów briefly housed Vasili IV, the Tsar of all Russia, and his brother Dmitry Shuisky, while they remained imprisoned by the Polish–Lithuanian Commonwealth. The prosperity of Mokotów, coming from its trade, ended with the economic decline in the countryside in the early 17th century. Between 1619 and 1620, only its 13 voloks were inhabited, including the three still exempt from taxes. The burden on the remaining farmers in oats, poultry, and eggs was doubled, and in 1645, another volok was established, with its owners being obligated to military service. In 1652, the cultivated area of the village had further decreased to 11 voloks. Mokotów, together with the surrounding settlements, was raised between 1655 and 1657, by the Swedish forces during the Second Northern War. In 1661, only five voloks were cultivated. In 1678, a portion of Mokotów was acquired by the politician and nobleman Stanisław Herakliusz Lubomirski, together with the nearby Służew and Służewiec. He previously already owned a portion of one of the tax-exempt voloks in the village. The latter two were later bought by king John III Sobieski at the end of the 17th century, and in the following decades, changed owners several times.

Since the first half of the 17th century, Szopy was owned by the Roman Catholic order of Discalced Carmelites. In 1795, as the area became part of the Kingdom of Prussia, the village was nationalised, and in the late 17th century, the government began placing German settlers in the village, which became known as Szopy Niemieckie (lit. 'German Szopy'). The Polish population settled an area to the east of Warsaw Escarpment, naming their settlement as Szopy Polskie (lit. 'Polish Szopy'). To the north of Szopy Polskie, was also founded Szopy Francuskie (lit. 'French Szopy'), settled by a French population.

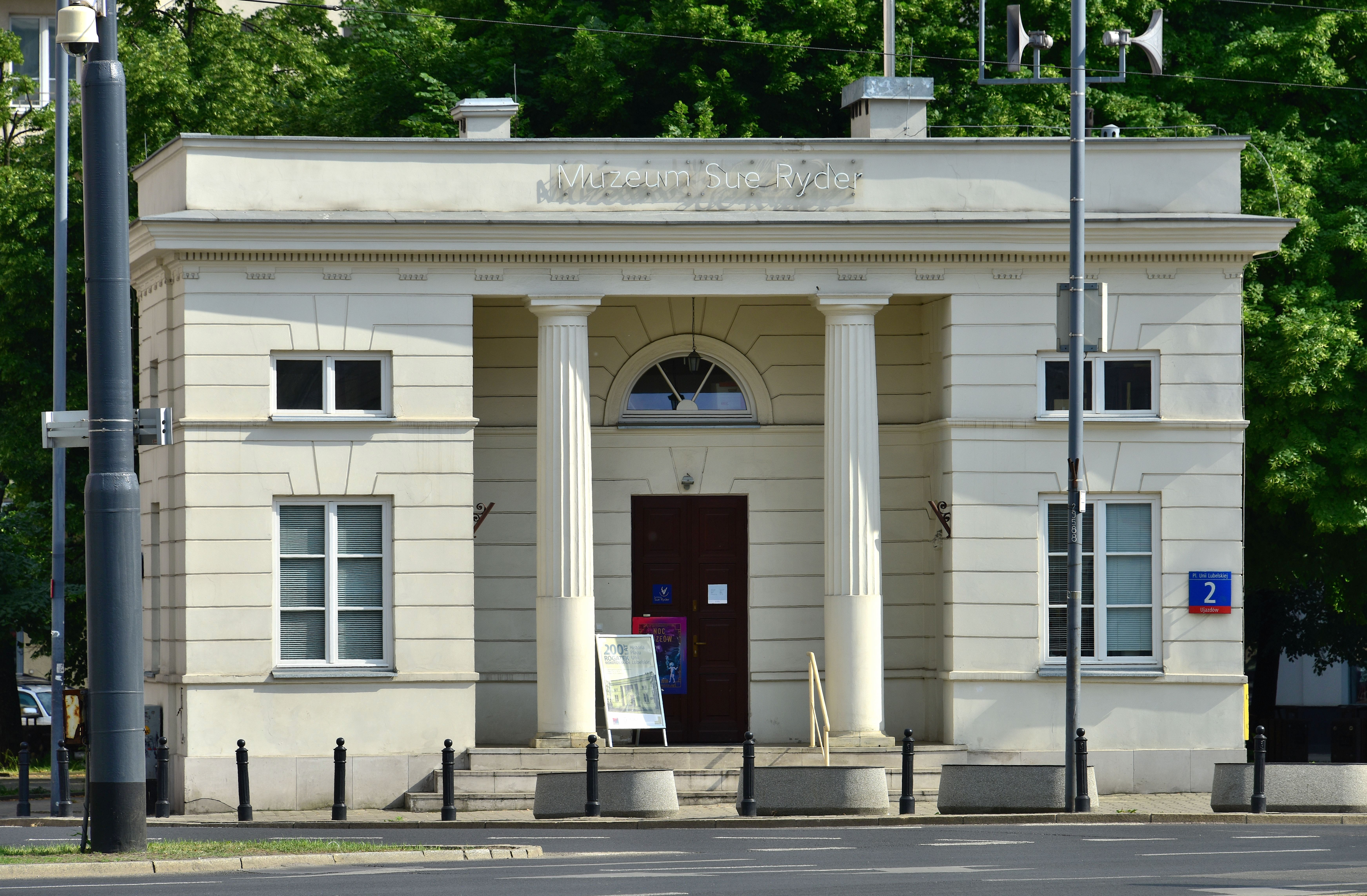
One of two neoclassical pavilions of the Mokotów Tollhouses in Old Mokotów, built in 1818.

Between 1768 and 1770, an urban layout of streets, known as the Stanislavian Axis, was developed on the initiative of king Stanisław August Poniatowski. It connected Old Warsaw and its satellite towns, with the Ujazdów Castle. It involved five roundabouts that were later devel into urban squares. The Union of Lublin Square, located to the north of the village of village of Mokotów, was one of them. In 1770, the Lubomirski Ramparts, a series of dirt ramparts were erected around Warsaw and its satellite towns, to decrease the spread of the plague during its second pandemic. The tollhouses were established at the entrances and exits to the agglomeration, on the roads crossing the rampart lines. One of them was placed at the Union of Lublin Square, with two pavilions placed on both sides of the current Puławska Street. In 1818, the buildings at the square were replaced with two neoclassical pavilions, called the Mokotów Tollhouses. The plague, which was expected to reach the city in 1771, was instead halted by a harsh winter. In 1794, during the Kościuszko Uprising, the ramparts were enforced with cannons placed in front and behind them, forming parts of the city fortifications during the siege of Warsaw the same year. In 1825, the ramparts were renovated, to aid in enforcing duty collection at the city boundaries. The ramparts were removed in 1875, following the abolishment of the duty fees from entering the city.

In 1732, a pavilion, designed by Carl Friedrich Pöppelmann, was built on the Rabbit Hill, in place of a rabbit husbandry established earlier that century. The structure served as a residence and an observation deck for king Augustus II the Strong, the monarch of the Polish–Lithuanian Commonwealth, during the military exercises and exhibition, which were held from 31 July to 19 August 1732, on the nearby fields in Czerniaków. It was deconstructed around 1735.

The village of Mokotów came back to prosperity again in the 18th century, with the development of numerous manor houses, villas, and palaces for wealthy landowners and townspeople. One of them was the Szuster Palace, built in 1774 for Elżbieta Izabela Lubomirska. In 1779, an extensive garden complex, now forming the Eye of the Sea Park, centred around the lake it was named after, was developed to the east of the residences. Several brickworks were also opened in the area, the largest being founded before 1779, at the Warsaw Escarpment, near the current Skolimowska Street.

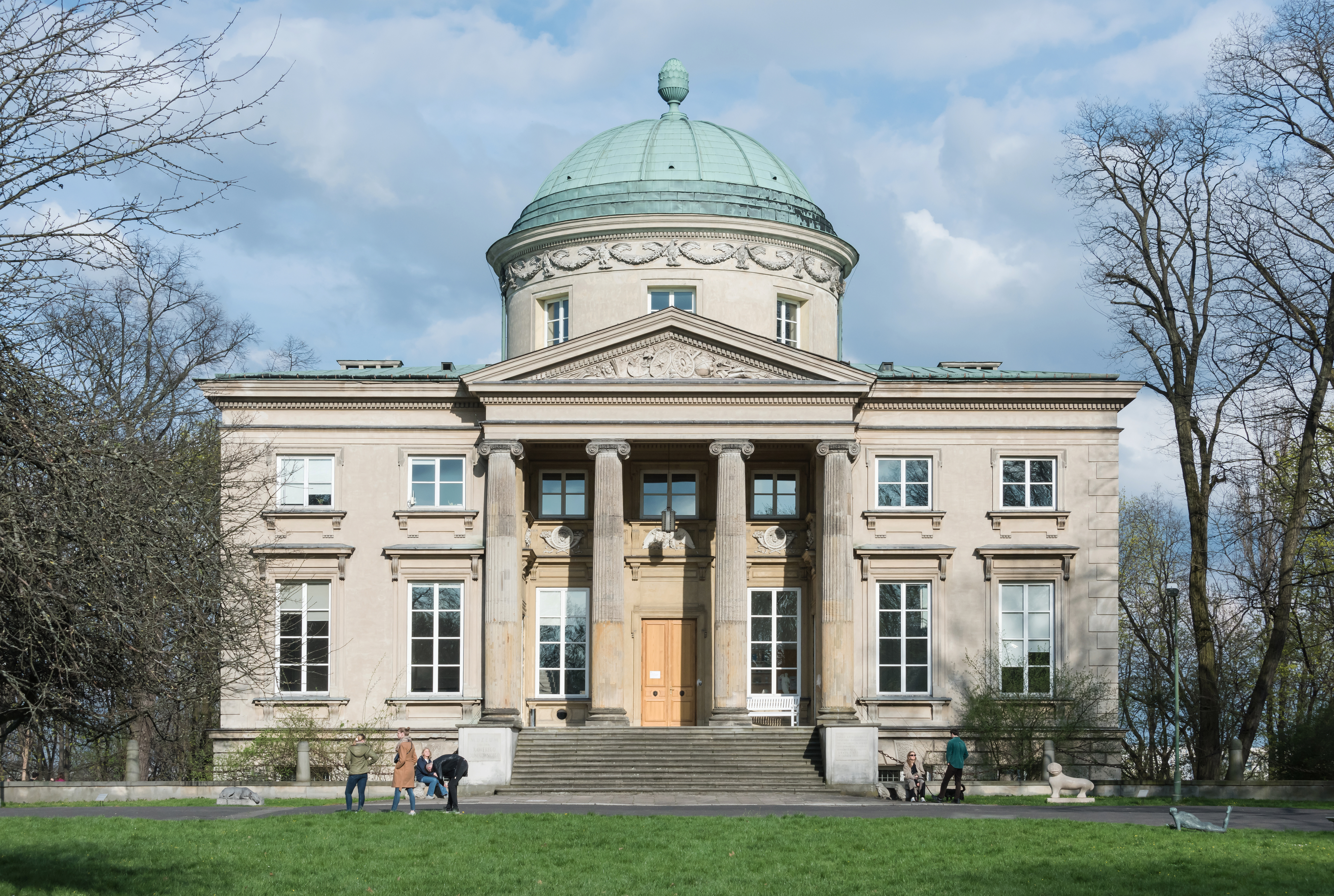
The Rabbit House, a neoclassical palace in Ksawerów, built in 1786.

In the 1770s, a plot of land was given by king Stanisław August Poniatowski to Józef Jakubowski, a brigadier in the French Army, who then established there a small agricultural estate, with a hamlet called Pod Wierzbą, later renamed to Wierzbno. Between 1782 and 1786, the Rabbit House, a neoclassical palace residence, was built to the south of Wierzbno on the Rabbit Hill. It became residence of businessperson Carlo Alessandro Tomatis, and his wife, dancer Caterina Gattai Tomatis, who was a royal mistress of king Stanisław August Poniatowski. The building was designed by Domenico Merlini. In 1794, during the Kościuszko Uprising, it served as the residence of Tadeusz Kościuszko, the leader of the insurgent forces. In 1816, the building was sold to statesman Michał Hieronim Radziwiłł.

=== 19th century ===
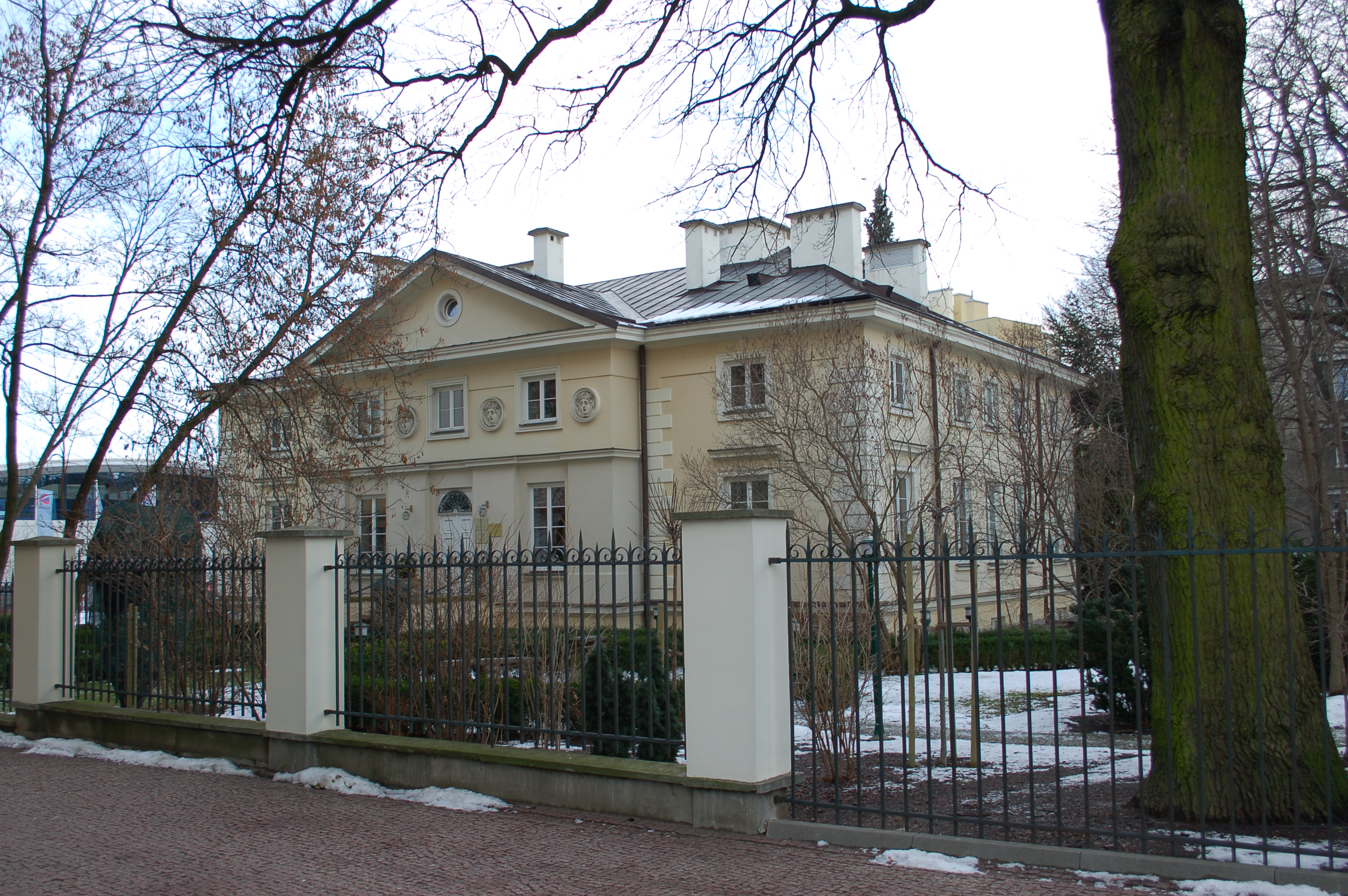
The Fanshawe Palace, a neoclassical palace in Wierzbno, built around 1850.

The village of Mokotów was destroyed and plundered by the soldiers of the Imperial Russian Army during the Kościuszko Uprising in 1794. The rebuilding began in the 1810s. In the 19th century, Mokotów became a popular holiday village, with numerous guesthouses, health and recreation facilities, restaurants and inns developing in the area. By the end of the century, the garden next to the Szuster Palace was turned into the Promenade amusement park, which included a luxury restaurant, acircus, and an open-air theatre, among other attractions. It operated until the outbreak of the First World War, and again, from its end until the beginning of the Second World War.

At the beginning of the 19th century, Henryk Bonnet, a French-born clerk who served as the state councillor and a judge in the district court of Warsaw, bought an area around current Malczewskiego Street, founding a hamlet of Henryków. It was originally inhabited by French settlers, and included a small palace residence of the Bonnet family. In 1824, Louisa Bonnet de Belon, Henryk Bonnet's daughter, married George Fanshawe, an English-born chamberlain and colonel in the Imperial Russian Army. The couple inherited the property around 1830, and around 1850, they built the Fanshawe Palace, in place of their former residence. In 1900, it was inherited by nobleman August Potocki, who, while never living there himself, had accommodated there the less wealthy members of his family. The building was burned down in 1944, during the Warsaw Uprising in the Second World War.

In 1818, the farmlands to the south of Warsaw were bought by the city, and turned into a military training area, later known as the Mokotów War Field. In around 1825, it became the cavalry drill site. In the first half of the 19th century, a horse racecourse was built at the Mokotów War Field, thanks to the efforts of Ivan Paskevich, the Viceroy of Poland. The first race officially organised by the Kingdom of Poland was held there in 1841. Various races and exhibitions were held at the venue in the following years, until they were eventually outlawed in 1861. The ban was lifted in 1880. In 1887, a new venue, the Mokotów Field Racecourse, was built on Polna Street, and in 1895, it hosted the first annual Great Warsaw Race, the most prestigious horse race in Poland. The venue was closed down in 1938, and its events were moved to the Służewiec Racecourse at Puławska Street.

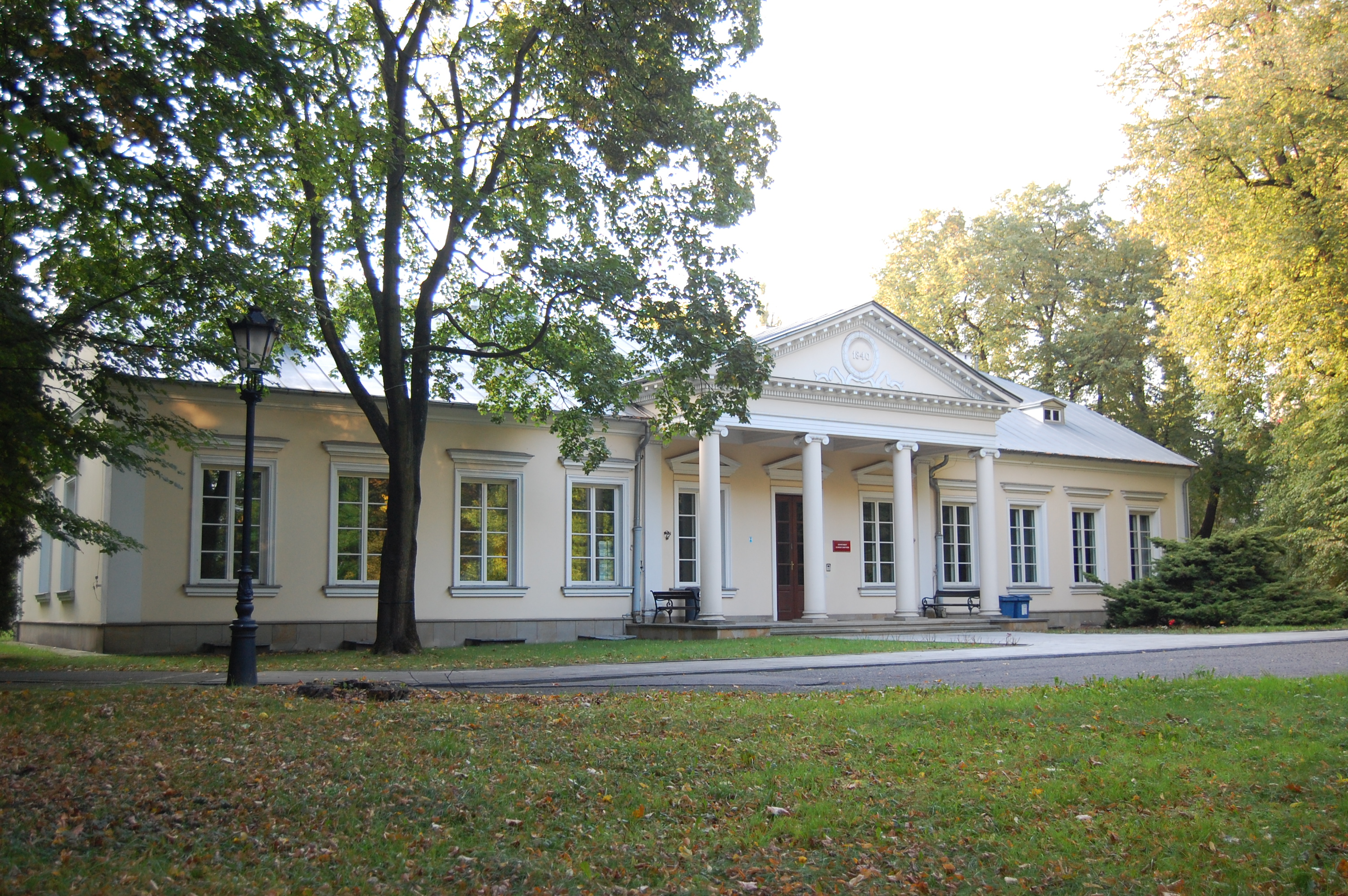
The Ksawerów Manor House, the neoclassical residence built 1840.

In 1840, nobleman Ksawer Pusłowski built his residence to the south of Wierzbno, now known as Ksawerów Manor House. In 1849, he also bought the Rabbit House. Over time, the area developed into two separate settlements, known as Królikarnia and Ksawerów.

Also in 1840, physician Ludwik Sauvan opened a hydrotherapy facility in Wierzbno, which used the local water spring, and operated until 1866. During the 19th century, Wierzbno and Mokotów also became popular holiday villages.

Between 1852 and 1853, the Yellow Tavern, designed by Francesco Maria Lanci, was built at the 204 Wilanowska Avenue in Służew. Until the beginning of the 20th century, it operated as a tavern known as Belle-Vue. After the tavern went bankrupt, the building was used for various purposes, including as a dog husbandry building, and a residential building. In 1966, it was nationalised, in an effort to protect it as cultural property. In 1984, the Museum of the Polish Peasant Movement was opened in the building.

In 1856, the Church of the Nativity of the Blessed Virgin Mary was built at the current intersection of Puławska and Dolna Streets. It originally belonged to the Roman Catholic Parish of St. Alexander, and in 1917, it became a seat of a new parish. It was the first church built within the boundaries of the modern Mokotów district. The building was destroyed in 1944, during the Warsaw Uprising. Between 1950 and 1966, the Saint Michael the Archangel Church was built in its place.

On 13 January 1867, following the administrative reform, the counties in the Kingdom of Poland were subdivided into municipalities. Mokotów became a seat of government of a eponymous municipality, which also included the villages of Czerniaków, Henryków, Królikarnia, Siekierki Małe, Siekierki Wielkie, Sielce, Szopy Niemieckie, Szopy Polskie, and Wierzbno. The area to the east, including villages of Janków and Wyględów became part of the municipality of Pruszków, while the area to the southeast, including Służew and Służewiec, became part of the municipality of Wilanów.

In 1881, a tramline connecting Mokotów and Wierzbno was opened with tracks built alongside Puławska Street. It was first operated by a horsecar, and since 1909, by an electric tram. The same year, the Puławska tram depot was opened on Goworka Street. It was closed down in 1955, with the trams being moved to the Mokotów tram depot in Służewiec. In 1892, the Warsaw narrow-gauge station (later renamed to Warsaw Mokotów in 1930 ) was opened next to the Union of Lublin Square, between Puławska and Chocimska Streets. It was part of two lines operated by the Wilanów Railway. In 1898, a line of the Grójec Commuter Railway was also added. In 1906, the Wierzbno station, operated by the Grójec Narrow-Gauge Railway, was opened near the current intersection of Puławska and Woronicza Streets, and near the Rabbit House palace, where it operated until 1937. In 1935, the Warsaw Mokotów station was moved to the intersection of Puławska and Odyńca Streets in Wierzbno, where it operated until 1938. Additionally, between 1903 and 1971, the Grójec Commuter Railway also operated the Służewiec station, located near the current intersection of Puławska and Dolina Służewiecka Streets.

In 1883, the Fort M "Mokotów" was built near Racławicka Street near Wyględów. It was a part of the series of fortifications of the Warsaw Fortress, built around the city by the Imperial Russian Army. It was further expanded with the construction of the Fort VIIA Służewiec was also built on Puławska Street near Służew in 1886, and the Fort M-Che near Czeczota Street near Wierzbno in 1892. The fortifications were decommissioned in 1909. The Fort VIIA Służewiec was partially demolished in 1913, and the Fort M-Che was fully demolished in the 1920s. The Fort M was transformed into a broadcasting station of the Polish Radio.

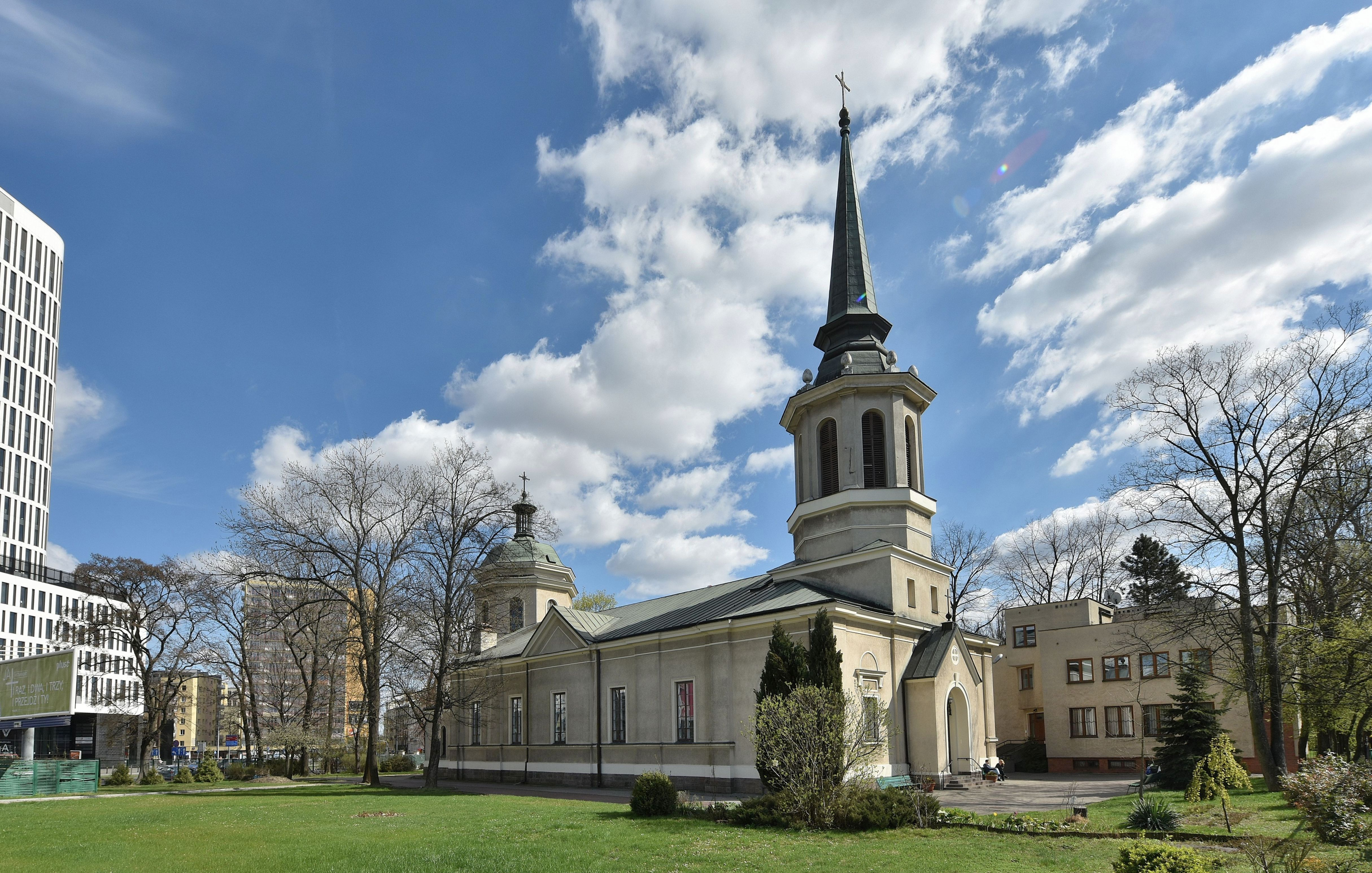
The Church of the Ascension of the Lord, built in 1904, and belonging to the Lutheran denomination.

Additionally, since 1875, the Kexholm Life Guard Regiment of the Imperial Russian Army had its barracks in Mokotów, next to the Union of Lublin Square. In 1904, an Eastern Orthodox eclectic temple, known as the Sts. Peter and Paul Church, was built nearby for the use by the garrison. Both were abandoned in 1915, with the evacuation of the Russian military from the city, following its capture by the Imperial German Army. In 1920, the temple was renamed to Church of the Ascension of the Lord, and adopted as a garrison church of the Evangelical Church of the Augsburg Confession. Until 1923, it was also used by a parish of the Evangelical Reformed Church. The building was destroyed in 1944 during the Warsaw Uprising in the Second World War. It was rebuilt in 1947, and in 1950, it became seat of a civilian parish of the Evangelical Church of the Augsburg Confession.

In 1897, the village of Mokotów had a population of 7,191 people.

=== Early 20th century ===
At the turn of the 20th century, the land of Mokotów was partitioned and sold for housing development, and numerous new streets were created. In the 1910s, following the decommissioning of the nearby fortifications, the area began rapidly developing with the construction of tenement houses, especially alongside Puławska Street and Topolowa Street (now Independence Avenue). Beginning in the 1920s, and continuing through the 1930s, Wierzbno also developed into a suburban residential neighbourhood with numerous villas and tenements being built to the east of Independence Avenue. The tenements were also built in the area of Puławska Street. This included the Scarab Beetle House, a historic modernist villa built in 1934 at 101 Puławska Street, as a residence of the deputy mayor of Warsaw, Władysław Malinowski.

In 1900, the Służew New Cemetery was founded at Wałbrzyska Street, as an extension of the Służew Old Cemetery at Fosa Street.

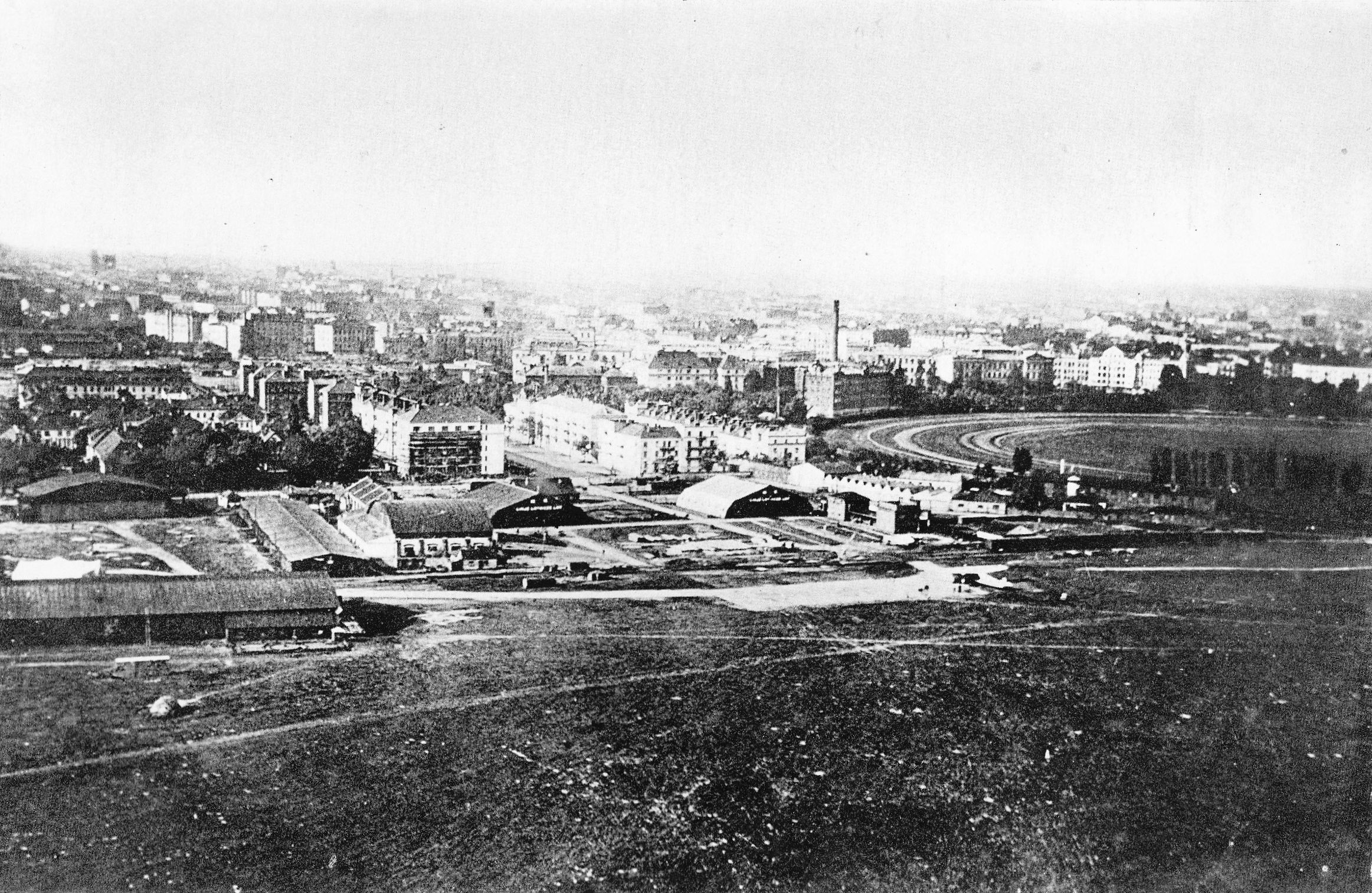
The Mokotów Aerodrome in the 1930s.

In 1910, the Mokotów Aerodrome was established at the Mokotów War Field, featuring dirt runways. It became the city's first aerodrome, and until the outbreak of the First World War, it was a popular civil and sports airfield. Following the beginning of the conflict in 1915, it began being used by the Imperial Russian Air Service, which stationed there six fighter planes. In August of the same year, the aerodrome was captured and used by the German Air Combat Forces. Its infrastructure was updated and expanded, and 21 new hangars were constructed, including those for the Parseval airships. Following the end of the war, and the establishment of the Second Polish Republic, in 1919, the aerodrome became a base for the growing military and civilian aviation industry. Since 1920, international passenger flights were chartered there. In 1929, it became the headquarters of the then-established national LOT Polish Airlines. It was also a venue for numerous air shows, parades, and international aviation tournaments. In 1934, the passenger traffic was moved to the Warsaw Chopin Airport in Okęcie. Following this, Independence Avenue was built between 1934 and 1938, crossing the cleared eastern side of the aerodrome. It formed a major arterial road connecting Mokotów with Downtown. It partially incorporated the former Topolowa Street in Mokotów. The aerodrome was closed down in 1947.

In 1909, Czerniaków, Szopy Polskie, Szopy Niemieckie, Siekierki Małe, and Siekierki Wielkie were transferred to the municipality of Pruszków. On 8 April 1916, the city of Warsaw incorporated the municipality of Mokotów, as well as its former villages in the municipality of Wilanów, and Janków and Wyględów in the municipality of Pruszków.

In 1918, the National Institute of Public Health was founded at 24 Chocimska Street in Old Mokotów, operating as a state research institute for hygiene, epidemiology, bacteriology, immunology, and parasitology.

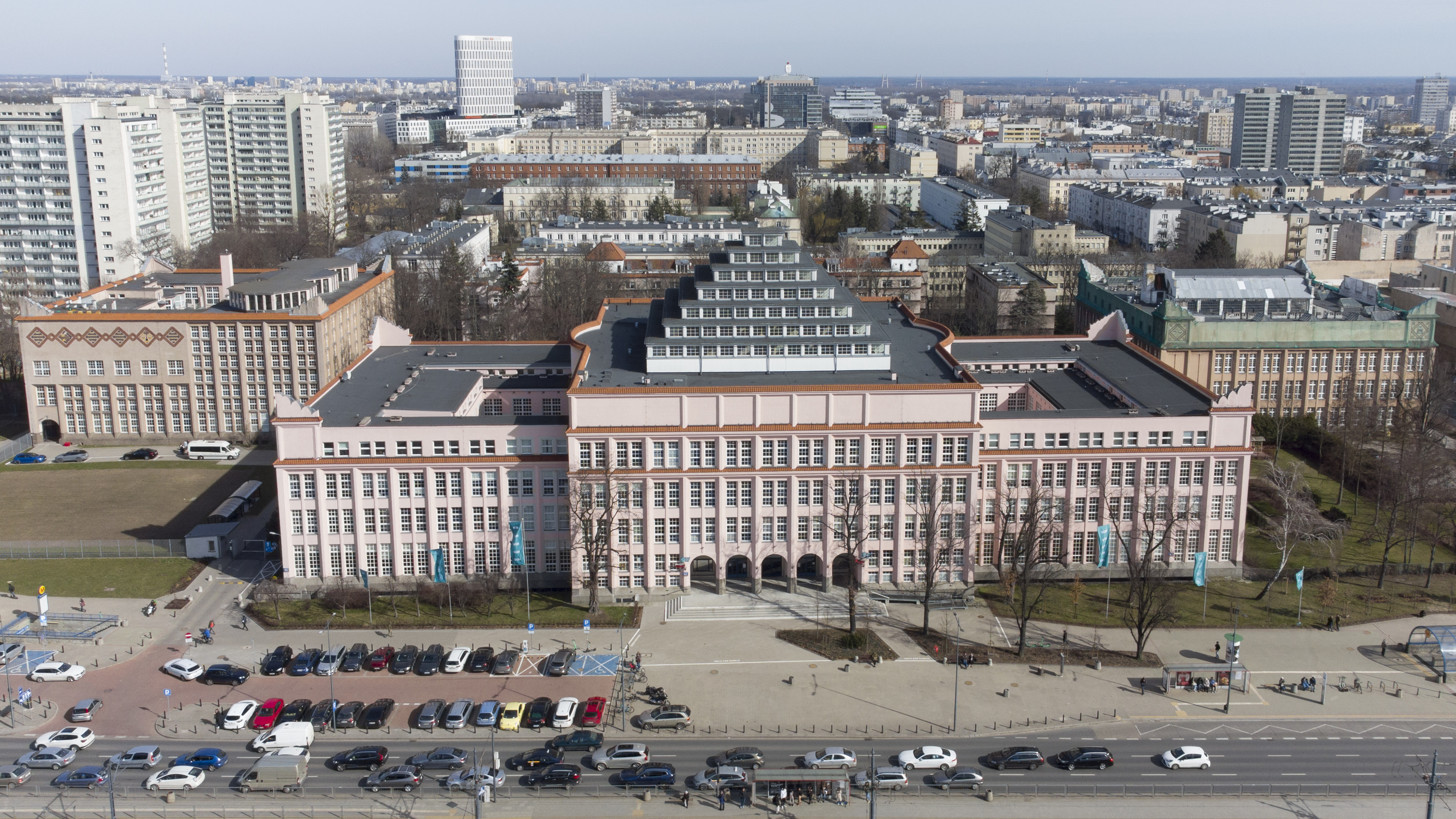
The campus of the SGH Warsaw School of Economics, opened in 1925.

In 1925, a new building of the SGH Warsaw School of Economics was opened at 24 Rakowiecka Street, and in 1931 it was joined with the library at 22 Rakowiecka Street. The campus was expanded in 1955 with another building at 162 Independence Avenue.

Around 1925, a campus of the Warsaw University of Life Sciences was opened at 26 and 30 Rakowiecka Street in Old Mokotów. It also included a small closed garden with an area of around 1.5 ha, which since 2003, has the status of a protected landscape park. During the Second World War, the school was officially closed, and continued teaching students in secret. It was reopened in 1945, after the end of the conflict. In the 1960s, the school begun developing a new campus on Nowoursynowska Street in Stary Służew. In 2003, all remaining faculties and institutions of the university were moved to the new campus.

In 1927, the tram tracks were built alongside Rakowiecka Street, connecting it with the network on Puławska Street. It ended with a turning loop at the intersection with Łowiecka Street.

In 1929, a palm house and greenhouses were opened at 11 Chodkiewicza Street in Wyględów for Zakład Hodowli Roślin (Plant Cultivation Works), making it the first complex of its kind in Warsaw. The buildings were destroyed in 1944 during the Warsaw Uprising, and the palm house was rebuilt nearby, at 4 Biały Kamień Street. It was rebuilt and modernised in 2009.

In 1930, the new headquarters of the Polish Geological Institute were opened at 4 Rakowiecka Street. The building also begun housing its museum of geology.

In 1931, the St. Elizabeth Hospital (originally known as St. Anthony Hospital), operated by the institute of Sisters of Saint Elizabeth, was opened at 1 Goszczyńskiego Street in Wierzbno. The building was destroyed during the Second World War, and rebuilt between 1946 and 1948. In 1949, it was nationalized. In 1993, the legal ownership of the building was returned to the Sisters of Saint Elizabeth, with the agreement that the building would operate until 2003, as the state medical institution, with them ultimately regaining the facility in 2006. In 2024, it was aquared by Luxmed private hospital network company.

In 1932, around 275 ha of farmland to the northwest of Służew was divided and sold out for housing construction. The area was developed into a neighbourhood of villas, known as Służew-Parcele, placed on the axis of Wałbrzyska Street. The Służew Square, surrounded by townhouses, was also developed to the south, at the corner of Puławska and Wałbrzyska Streets. The area became an exclusive neighbourhood for the city's elite, including high-ranking members of the government and military, politicians, businesspeople, and scientists. The villas were designed by numerous noteworthy architects, in various styles, such as Art Deco, modernism, and Polish manor house.

In 1934, a new campus of two buildings of the Hipolit Wawelberg and Stanisław Rotwand State Higher School of Machine Construction and Electrical Engineering was opened at 85 Nurbutta Street in Old Mokotów. Its main building, located at 4 and 6 Mokotowska Street in Downtown was destroyed in 1944 during the Warsaw Uprising in the Second World War. The school reopened after the war in 1945 in the new campus, under the name Hipolit Wawelberg and Stanisław Rotwand School of Engineering. In 1951, it was merged with the Warsaw University of Technology, which uses its campus to the present day. In 1948, two new buildings were added to the campus, located at 84 and 86 Nurbutta Street, as the headquarters of the Faculty of Automotive and Construction Machinery Engineering, and the Faculty of Mechanical Engineering, respectively.

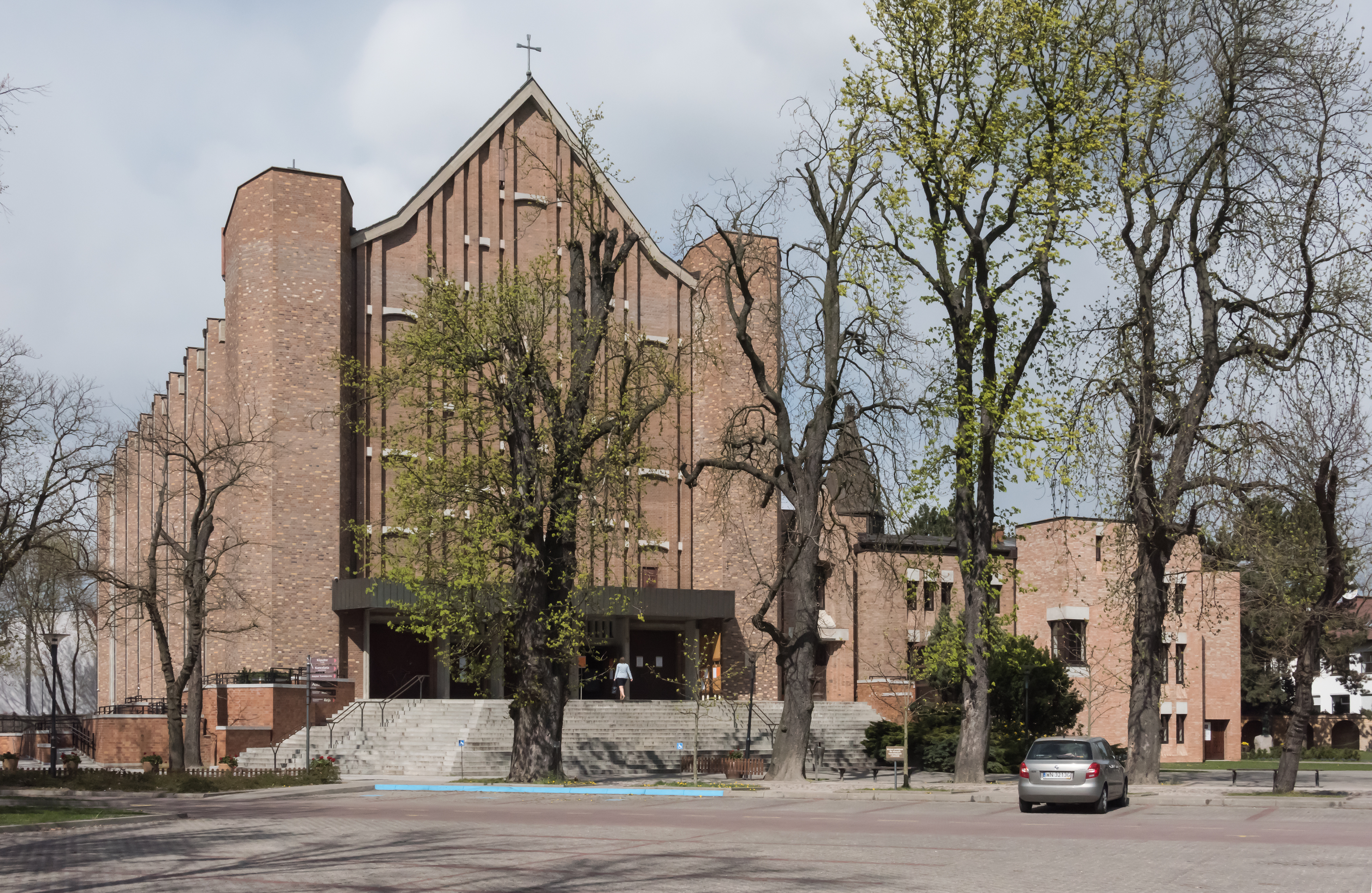
The St. Joseph Monastery of the Dominican Order, on the left, built in 1937, and the St. Dominic Church, on the right, built in 1994.

In 1937, the St. Joseph Monastery of the Dominican Order, was built at 2 Dominikańska Street in Służew. In the 1950s, a half of its land was confiscated by the government, and to protect the rest, it was turned into the St. Dominic Church, becoming a seat of a parish which encompassed Służew. A new church building was built next to it between 1985 and 1994.

In 1937, the Warszawa Szopy narrow-gauge railway station was opened at the intersection of Puławska Street and Wilanowa Avenue. It was operated by the Grójec Commuter Railway, forming a part of the line between Warszawa Mokotów and Nowe Miasto nad Pilicą. In 1943, it was renamed to Warszawa Pułudniowa (lit. 'Warsaw South'). The station operated until 1969. In the 1970s, a bus station with a turning loop was opened at the location, under the name of the South Station. It originally used the historic building of the railway station, which was eventually deconstructed in 2000. Since then, it function under the name of Wilanowska turning loop.

On 27 September 1938, Służew and Służewiec were incorporated into the city of Warsaw, becoming part of the Mokotów district.

In 1938, the Dreszer Park was opened in Wierzbno between Ursynowska Street, Puławska Street, Odyńca Street, and Independence Avenue. It was designed by Zygmunt Hellwig in the modernist style.

In 1939, the Służewiec Racecourse was built at 266 Puławska Street, located to the southeast of Służewiec, and to the west of Służew. Upon its opening, it became the largest and most modern horse racing venue in Europe, with its main circuit measuring 2,300 m. It began hosting the Great Warsaw Race, the most prestigious horse race in Poland. In 1938, the municipal tram network was extended towards the Służewiec Racecourse with tracks built alongside Puławska Street, ending with a turning loop at the current intersection of Dolina Służewiecka and Rzymowskiego Streets. The race track is currently located within the boundaries of the Ursynów district.

In 1939, the new headquarters building of the General Staff of the Polish Armed Forces was opened at 4A Rakowiecka Street in Old Mokotów.

In the late 1930s, a neighbourhood of single-family detached homes for the officers of the Polish Armed Forces, was developed around the Fort M.

=== Second World War ===
==== Siege of Warsaw ====
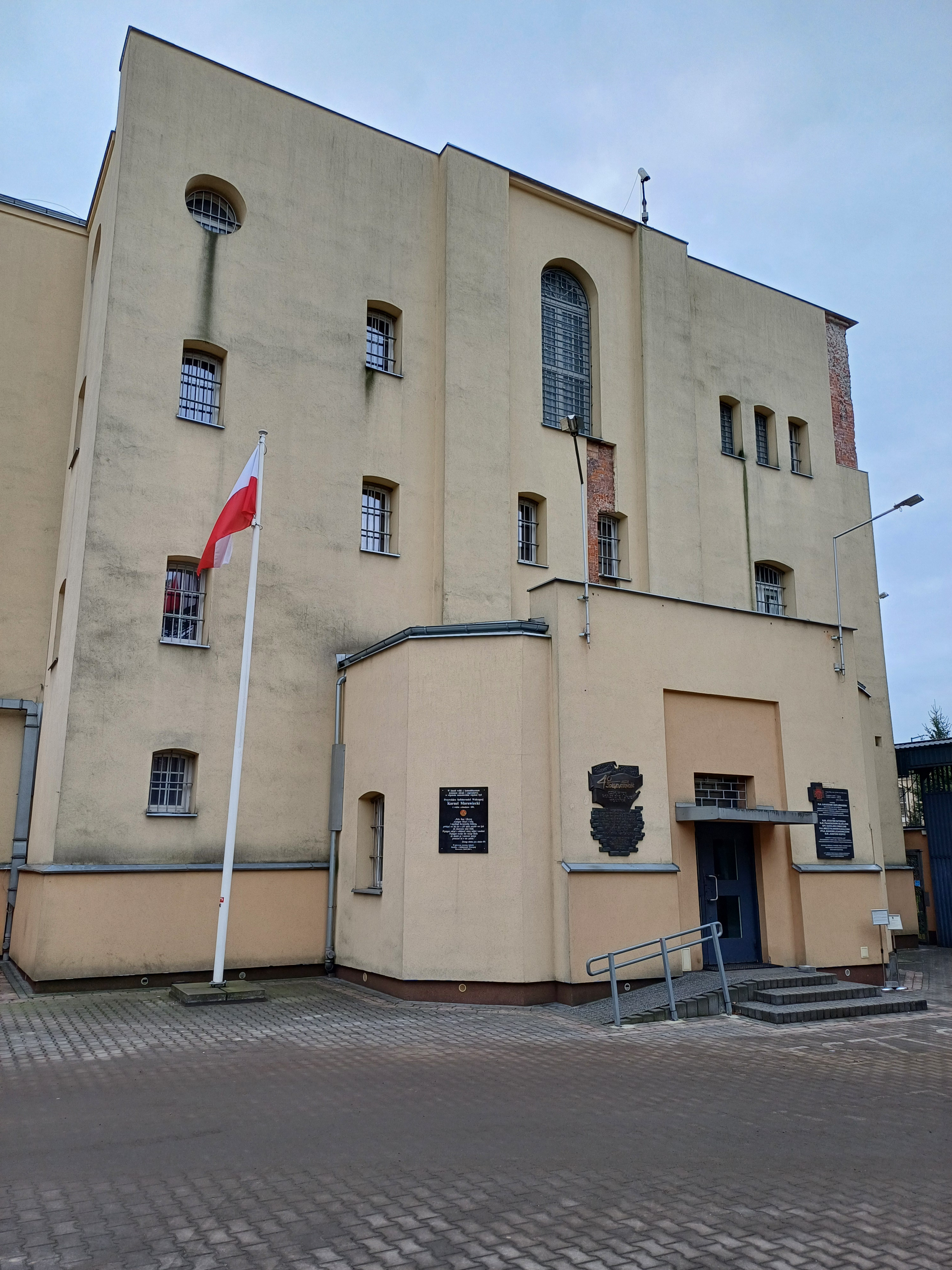
The former building of the Mokotów Prison, built in 1904. During the Second World War, it was used by the German regime to hold political prisoners, and was a location of a massacre in 1944.

On 1 September 1939, Nazi Germany began the invasion into Poland, starting the Second World War, with their forces arriving at the outskirts of Warsaw on 8 September, besieging the city. Polish positions in Mokotów were mainly defended by the 4th battalion of the 21st Infantry Regiment, and one battery of 75 mm guns. On 9 September, the German forces began an attack on the city, supported by an aerial and artillery bombardment. The 2nd battalion of the 12th Motorised Rifle Regiment, and the 2nd Battalion of the 35th Tank Regiment, charged through the Mokotów Field, before being forced to retreat around the intersection of Independence Avenue and Wawelska Street, by the fire from the infantry and artillery in Mokotów and Ochota. On the next day, German forces launched a series of small diversion attacks on Mokotów, Ochota, and Wola. On 12 September, a group of soldiers from the 360th Infantry Regiment of the Polish Armed Forces, led by lieutenant colonel Jakub Chmura, together with two tank companies, attacked German positions in Okęcie. As part of the offensive, a portion of the soldiers, commanded by Czesław Chamerski, and supported by half of a tank battalion, captured the Służewiec Racecourse with light German resistance. From there, it headed towards the Fort VI "Okęcie", being pushed back by heavy fire from fortified German soldiers, eventually retreating at 11:00 am. The Polish side suffered around 80 dead and wounded soldiers, which amounted to around 45% of its forces. On 25 September, the Fort M, which housed a Polish radio station, was attacked by the 10th Infantry Division of the German Armed Forces, and was captured the next day. On 26 September, the German 10th Tank Division also attacked Mokotów from the south, with heavy fighting taking place at the intersections of Ursynowska Street with Independence Avenue, and with Puławska Street, before being pushed back to its positions at the Rabbit House palace, losing 3 tanks and several other vehicles and numerous soldiers. The next day, they repelled a Polish counteroffensive, suffering huge casualties. The city eventually capitulated on 28 September.

==== German occupation ====
While under occupation, Mokotów housed strong garrison of German units, including a grenadier battalion of the Protection Squadron in barracks at 4A Rakowiecka Street, in the former building of the General Staff of the Polish Armed Forces, and barracks at Kazimierzowa and Woronicza Streets. The Fort M housed the headquarters of the Warsaw Airport Command of the German Air Force, with a staff of 500 people, and the barracks. The air force also stationed anti-aircraft artillery at the Mokotów Aerodrome, while the operations of the airport were limited to minimum, with barracks for its operators on Puławska Street. The neighbourhood also featured the headquarters of the local branch of the Gendarmerie of the Order Police on Dworkowa Street. Additionally, the Mokotów Prison, with its building dating to 1904, began being used to hold the political prisoners, as an auxiliary facility to the Pawiak prison. It was constantly overcrowded, with the peak number of inmates recorded at 2,505 in November 1941. Around 30% of the prisoners were released in July 1944.

On 6 February 1943, the alderman of Warsaw signed the law establishing the German Residencial District, with the area of the neighbourhood of Old Mokotów, to the east of Puławska Street, becoming its part. It was envisioned as an area exclusive to German residents, although it was not separated physically by walls and other boundaries from the rest of the city. While it had large population of German residents, including immigrants from Germany and people from Poland who were given the Volksdeutsche status, it also housed Russian and Ukrainian collaborators, and Poles who were given exemption from being relocated to other parts of the cities. In May 1944, some parts of the German Residencial District were separated by the authorities with barbed wire fences.

==== Warsaw Uprising ====
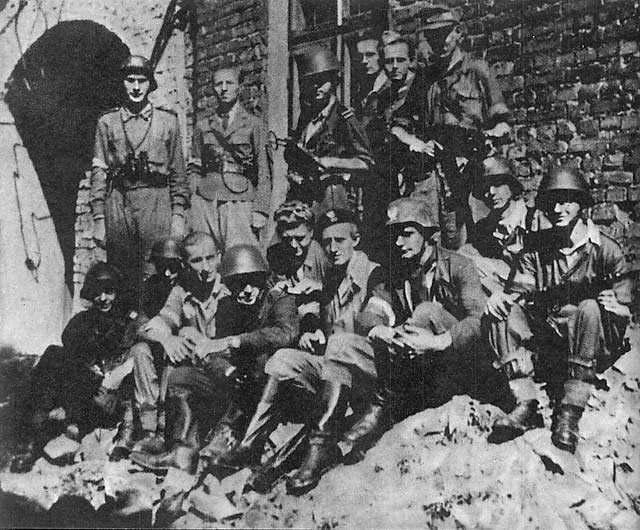
The Home Army soldiers of the Baszta Regiment Group, which fought in Old Mokotów during the Warsaw Uprising.

On 1 August 1944, at 17:00, with the beginning of the Warsaw Uprising, the soldiers of the Mokotów Subdistrict of the Home Army underground resistance attacked the German forces in targets across the neighbourhood. They suffered heavy casualties while attacking German defensive positions on Rakowiecka and Puławska Street. They also failed to capture German barracks on Kazimierzowa and Woronicza Streets, as well as the Fort M, which was subsequently used to organise counterattacks on the insurgents. As such, the majority of the Polish units retreated from the area to the Kabaty Woods. Five companies of the Baszta Regiment Group, commanded by Stanisław Kamiński "Daniel", fortified themselves in the apartment buildings in a rectangular area marked by Odyńca Street, Goszczyńskiego Street, Puławska Street, and Independence Avenue. They captured more territory in the following days, forming a strong resistance movement in the area of Upper Mokotów. The same day, a group of civilians was rounded up in Służew, and executed at the nearby Służewiec Racecourse. It was done in the retaliation for the unsuccessful attack on the location, organised earlier that day by the Polish insurgents. Some time later, most of the houses in Służew-Parcele were set on fire by German officers in retaliation for the uprising.

At the night of 1 to 2 August 1944, the German officers executed the captured Polish soldiers. This included all officers captured during the attack on Rakowiecka Street, and around 19 wounded soldiers from the Olza Battalion, captured in an attack on Fort M. A portion of the victims was buried alive in the ground, which was later confirmed during the exhumations of the bodies in 1945. The German officers refused to treat the captured insurgents in accordance with the international law about the prisoners of war, not granting them the status of protected persons. The German command also ordered the destruction of the city and mass killings and deportation of all its residents, which led to the series of war crimes, committed on the civilians in neighborhood, known as the suppression of Mokotów. At night, the German officers also committed first mass murders on the civilian population of Mokotów. After pushing back Polish attack, officers of the garrison of the Okęcie Airport forcibly gathered around 500 civilians at Fort M, sporadicly executing people while removing them from their houses. This included numerouns residents on Bochmacka, Baboszewska, and Syryńska Streets.

In the morning of 2 August, 20 soldiers of the Protection Patrol entered a Jesuit monastery at 61 Rakowiecka Street, which provided a shelter to several civilians, with accusation that the German soldiers were shot at from the building. The soldiers searched the monetary, not finding any proof to their claims. Afterwards, they forced all occupants to a small room in the basement, where they threw grenades at them. The soldiers spend the next several hours searching for and killing the survivors. Around 40 people, including 18 Jesuits, were killed. The bodies were doused with petrol and lighted up. Fourteen people survived, mostly with injuries, and managed to leave the building after the German officers left.

On 1 August, the Mokotów Prison held 794 inmates, of which 41 were under the age of 18. On that day, it was attacked by 80 soldiers of the Baszta Regiment Group, led by Antony Figura "Kot". The regiment managed to capture the administration building but could not gain control over the buildings with cells, and retreated the next day. During the fighting, the German officers interned Polish prison guards. On 3 August, a unit of the Protection Squadron arrived to the prison, with orders to execute all of its inmates and interned guards. A group of 60 inmates were ordered to dig two rows of graves at the courtyard, being executed by machine gun fire afterwards. In the following hours, the German officers executed over 600 prisoners. Having observed the courtyard massacre from their cells, some inmates decided to break out from the prison. They killed a few soldiers, set fire to the prison, freed other inmates and barricaded the second floor. The soldiers and guards retreated from the building to the front gate, assuming the prisoners would have to cross it to escape. Instead, the inmates climbed onto the roof at night, and descended the prison wall with ladders provided by nearby residents. Between 200 and 300 inmates escaped to the area controlled by the Home Army insurgents. The fate of the interned Polish guards remains unknown, with conflicting testimonials of witnesses whether they were executed or not.

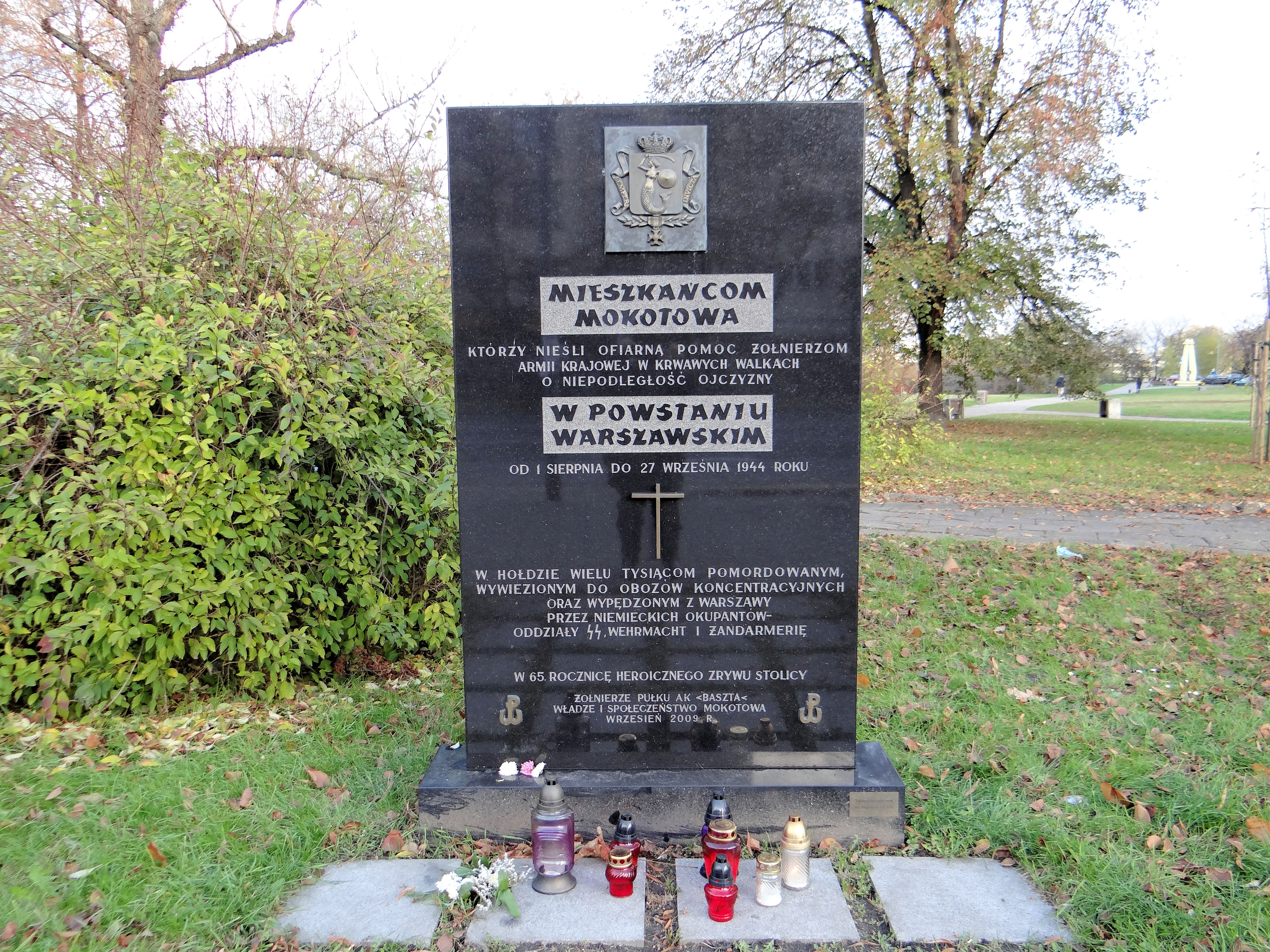
The memorial to the victims of the suppression of Mokotów during the Warsaw Uprising.

In the first days of the uprising, the German officers from the Protection Squadron, the Order Police, and the German Armed Forces repeatedly carried out raids aimed at terrorizing the Polish civilian population in Old Mokotów. During those actions, they committed summary execution, burned down houses, and raped women. On 2 August, several dozen civilians, including women and children, were executed on Madalińskiego and Kazimierzowska Streets. Among them, ten men were locked in a small room, and burned alive. On 3 August, officers of the Order Police, backed by several tanks and Ukrainian collaborators, committed series of summary executions alongside Puławska Street and adjusted cross streets, killing several hundreds civilians, including women and children. Over 150 residents of houses at 49 and 51 Puławska Street, mostly women and children, were rounded up and taken to the vicinity of the headquarters of the Gendarmerie of the Order Police on Dworkowa Street. When arriving at the nearby staircase leading down an escarpment to a park area, now known as the Eye of the Sea Park, the German officers lifted barbed wire, suggesting they were letting captured civilians escape to the area controlled by the Home Army. After a portion of the group descended down the staircase, the officers opened fire, killing around 80 people.

In the morning of 4 August, two companies of the Baszta Group Regiment conducted an unsuccessful attack on the headquarters of the Gendarmerie of the Order Police. In the retaliation, its officers, together with a group of Ukrainian collaborators, targeted residents of tenements at 5 and 7 Olesińska Street. They rounded up somewhere between 100 and 200 people were rounded up in the basement and murdered with grenades, with survivors being executed with machine guns. The event became one of the largest singular mass killings in Mokotów during the uprising. The next day, officers of the Protection Squadron and the Security Police rounded up and executed around 100 people at 3 and 5 Skolimowska Street, and around 80 people at 11 Puławska Street. Among the victims were several members of the Polish resistance, which were hiding in the area, including captain Leon Światopełk-Mirski, the commander of the 3rd region of the Mokotów Subdistrict of the Home Army. The German officers continued to sporadically enact another executions in the following days. They killed around 20 residents of a tenement at 132 and 136 Independence Avenue on 11 August, and around 30 residents of a tenement at 39 and 43 Madalińskiego Street. Some witnesses also recounted execution of around 60 people near Rakowiecka Street, sometime at turn of August and September 1944.

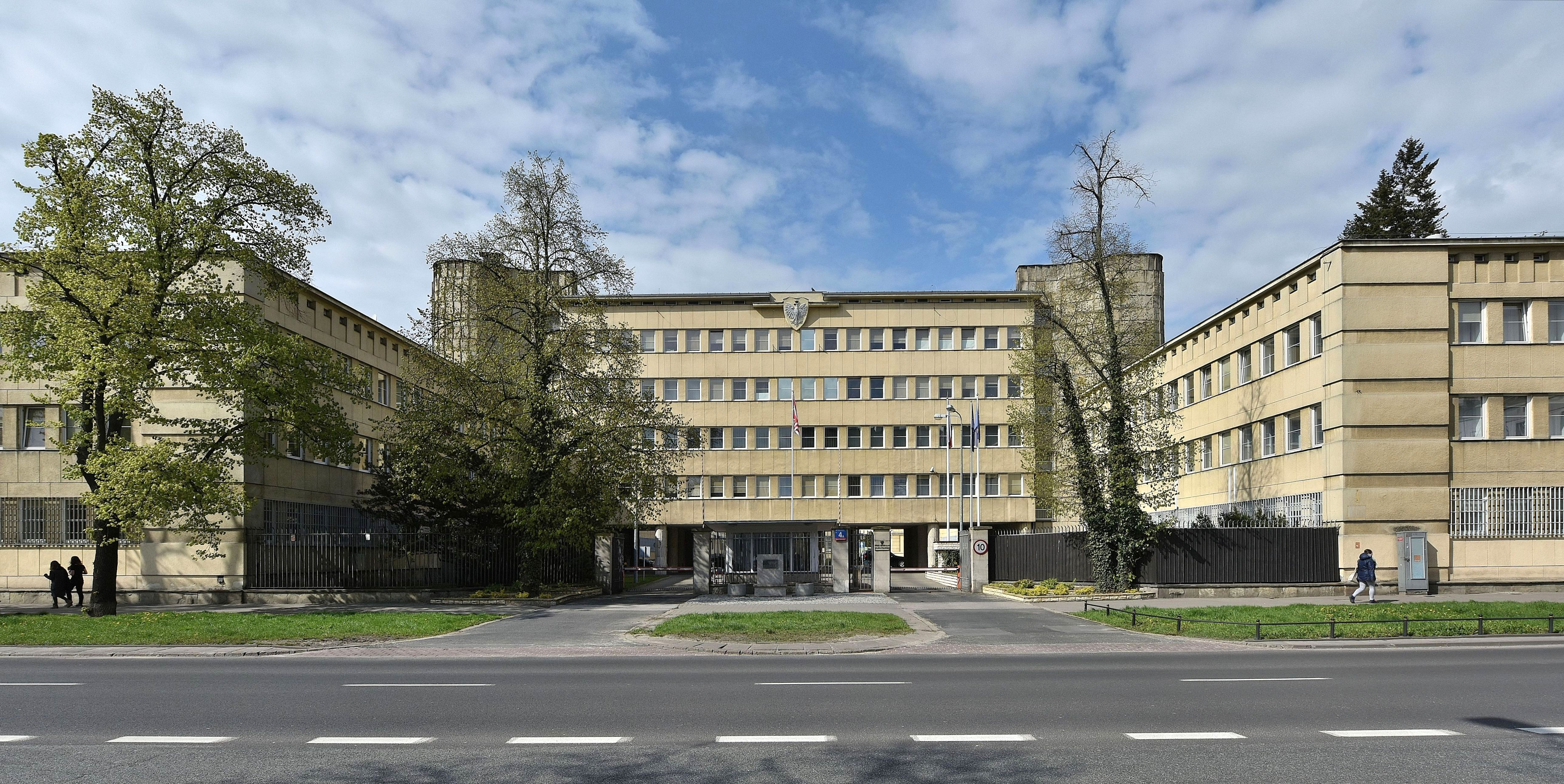
The building of the General Staff of the Polish Armed Forces, which during the Second World War served as the barracks of the Protection Squadron, and later an interment camp for Polish civilians during the Warsaw Uprising.

On 2 August, the officers of the Protection Squadron, forcibly removed residents of tenements at several streets in Mokotów, and gathered them at their barracks, located the former building of the General Staff of the Polish Armed Forces at 4A Rakowiecka Street. The building was turned into a provisionary prison, with inmates being held as hostages, with the threat of being executed if the insurgent would not capitulate within three days. A majority of women and children were freed the next day. In the following days, as the German officers began systematically and forcibly expelling Polish population from Mokotów, the facility was turned into a permanent internment camp for the displaced population. A majority of the inmates were adult men, who were forced to perform labour such as dismantling insurgent barricades, cleaning tanks, burying corpses, earthworks in the barracks, cleaning the streets and latrines, or carrying and loading goods stolen by the German officers onto lorries. Most of the labour was intended solely to exhaust and humiliate the detainees. The staff tormented and beat the prisoners at every opportunity. The inmates were also starved with dangerously low rations. The first group of prisoners received food only on the second day, while some were starved until the third day. The harsh conditions soon led to the complete exhaustion of the prisoners. An epidemic of dysentery also broke out among the inmates.

At least 100 people were executed in the facility. On 3 August, 45 men were picked at random, and executed by the officers. According to some sources, it took place the next day instead. Another group of 45 men were killed the next day. Individual executions also often took place within the barracks. Some of the male inmates were also transported by the Gestapo in the cars to an unknown destination, with their fate unknown. They were most likely executed in the Police District, in the former building of the General Inspector of the Armed Forces, or near the headquarters of the Secret Police on Szuch Avenue. This included between 20 and 40 men taken on 9 August, and a group of nearly 70 men, taken on a single day, at the turn of August and September. Women inmates were used as human shields, being forced to walk in front of the tanks, while charging insurgent barricades. After some time, prisoners would be transferred to the transit camp no. 121 in Pruszków, and other gathering points. The prison operated until the second half of September, though many inmates were held there until the beginning of October.

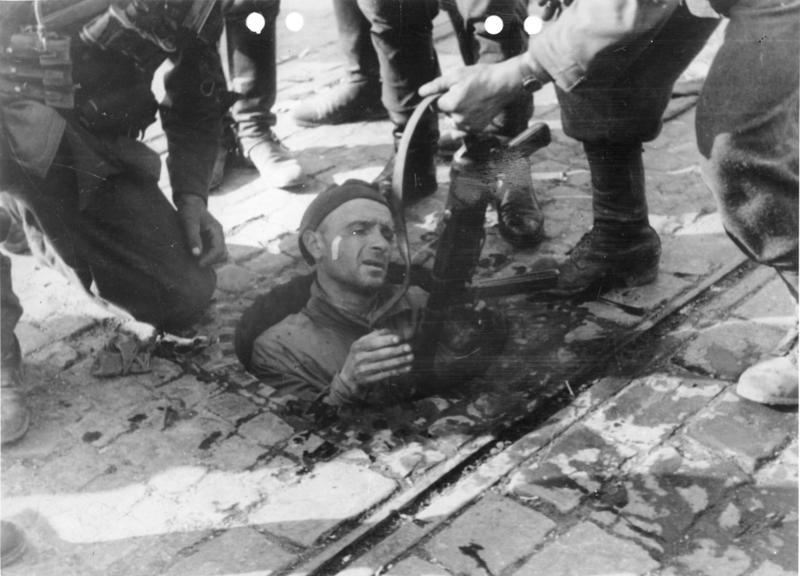
One of the Home Army soldiers being pulled out from the sewage canals by the German officers on Dworkowa Street on 26 September 1944, prior to the massacre of the captured insurgents.

On 24 September, the German soldiers attacked the insurgent positions in Upper Mokotów, leading to heavy fighting in the following days. As the attackers gained overwhelming advantage, the commander of insurgents forces in district, lieutenant colonel Józef Rokicki "Karol", ordered a retreat on 26 September. The troops had to travel via the sewerage network to Downtown. Several hours later, brigadier general Antoni Chruściel "Monter", the commander of all insurgents forces, gave orders to return to Mokotów and continue fighting. By that point, around 800 already arrived at their destination, and around 400 were still in the canals. German officers barricaded some of the entrances to the canals, and through granades and pumped the calcium carbide gas, causing casualties among the insurgents. Amit the chaos, a group of soldiers got lost in the canals, and mistakenly went to the entrance near the headquarters of the Gendarmerie of the Order Police on Dworkowa Street. After being discovered, they were forced to resurface by its officers and taken captive around 10:00 on 27 September. The German officers separated civilians and a portion of women nurses and runners from the rest of the group. The soldiers were then forced to kneel on an edge of an escarpment of the Eye of the Sea Park. After one of the soldiers made an unsuccessful attempt to take a weapon from a guard, the entire group of around 140 captives was executed. Another group of 98 soldiers captured in the canals, was executed the same day near Chocimska Street. During the fighting, the German officers conducted series of summary executions of wounded soldiers and medical staff in the field hospitals across the city, including in Mokotów. On 26 September, several patients were killed on field hospitals at 17 and 19 Czeczota Street, and at 117 and 119 Independence Avenue.

In the evening of 27 September, the last insurgent troops in Mokotów agreed to capitulate, in exchange of having their rights as combatants recognised, including having the status of the protected persons. Around 1,000 soldiers were taken captive. Despite this, on that day, the German officers executed an unknown number of wounded soldiers on Szustra Street, and set a field hospital on fire at 91 Puławska Street, killing over 20 people. The civilian population was systematically expelled from captured territory, with soldiers plundering and setting the buildings on fire. Over 70 men, suspected of participating in the uprising, were executed on Kazimierzowska Street. The expelled civilians were rounded up at the Służewiec Racecourse at 266 Puławska Street, from where they were transported to the transit camp no. 121 in Pruszków. The neighbourhood suffered large destruction throughout the conflict, with the majority of its buildings being destroyed. The area, together with the rest of Warsaw, was captured by the Red Army of the Soviet Union on 17 January 1945.

=== Communist period ===
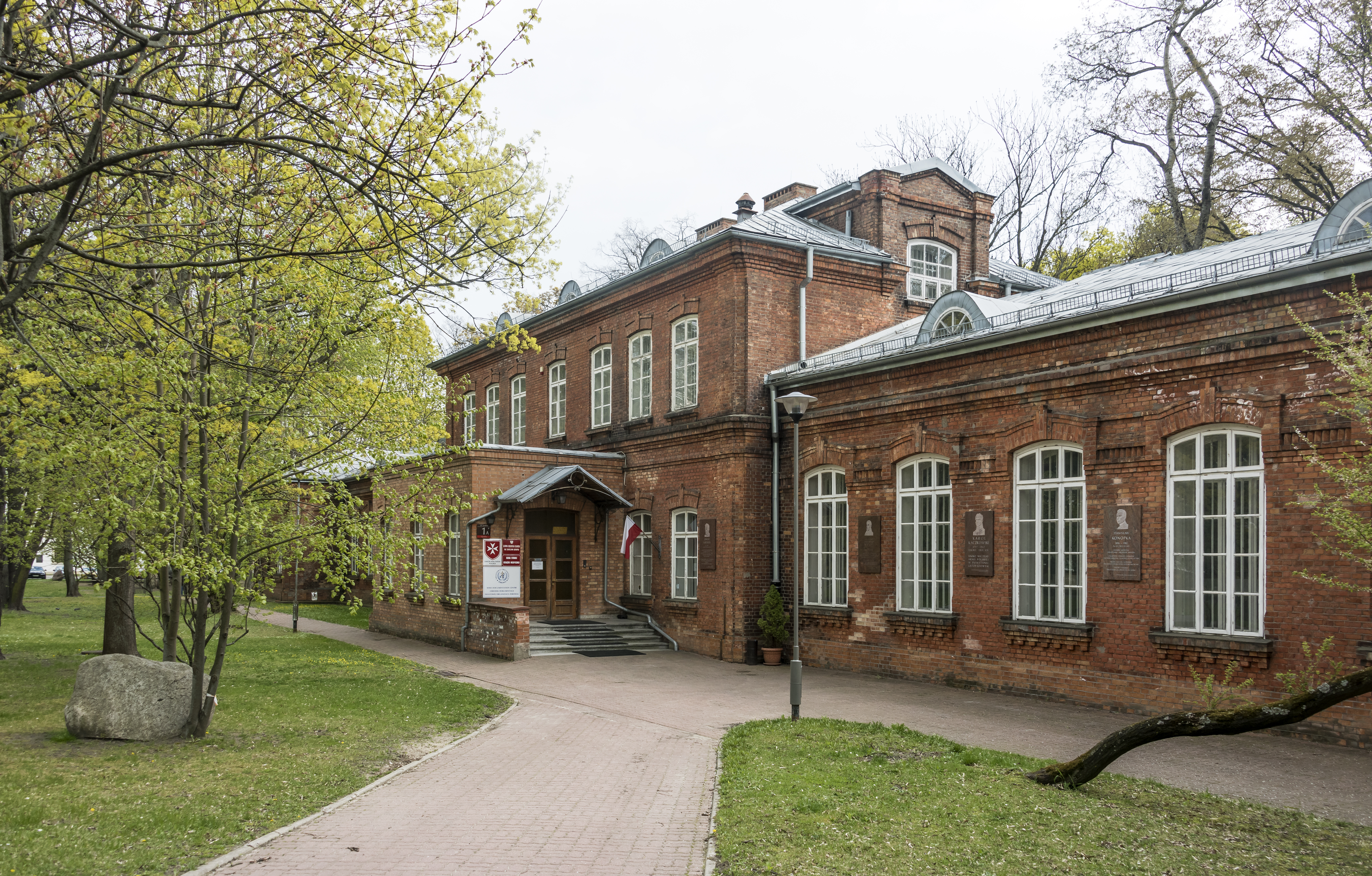
The Stanisław Konopka Central Medical Library, founded in 1945.

In 1944, the Roman Catholic order of Discalced Carmelites founded a monastery on Czeczota Street in Wierzbno. It was destroyed the same year by the German officers during the Warsaw Uprising. Another monastery was founded nearby on Ursynowska Street in 1947. Currently, it forms the headquarters of the Warsaw Province of the Most Holy Trinity, one of the two provinces of Discalced Carmelites in Poland.

In 1945, the People's Commissariat for Internal Affairs of the Soviet Union began using the Mokotów Prison to hold political prisoners. In 1948, its administration was given to the Ministry of Public Security of Poland. The inmates were tortured and executed. The number of the victims remains unknown. Their bodies were disposed across the city, including being buried in mass unmarked graves at the Służew New Cemetery and the Powązki Military Cemetery. In 1956, the facility began operating as a regular criminal prison. It was closed in 2017. Since then, it houses the Museum of the Cursed Soldiers and the Political Prisoners of the Polish People's Republic.

In 1945 the Rabbit House became the property of the city of Warsaw, being confiscated from the Krasiński family, who previously owned it, via the Bierut Decree. The building was rebuilt in 1964, and in 1965, the Xawery Dunikowski Museum of Sculpture was opened inside. It contained the contains sculptures from the collection of the Warsaw National Museum. In 1945, the Stanisław Konopka Central Medical Library was also founded at 22 Chocimska Street in Old Mokotów, as a cultural institution of the Ministry of Health. It operates as a research library aiming to collect all Polish literature in the field of medicine and related sciences, as well as the most important works of world medical literature.

In 1947, the New Theatre was founded in a venue at 39 Puławska Street in Old Mokotów, later renamed to the State New Theatre in 1949, introducing musical and comedy acts. In 1954, it was transformed into the Warsaw State Operetta, a comedy theatre group, was founded at 39 Puławska Street. In 1966, it moved to 49 Nowogrodzka Street in Downtown, and was reorganised into the Roma Musical Theatre in 1994. From 1966 to 1974, the building was used as one of two venues of the People's Theatre. In 1974, the New Theatre was reestablished at the venue, operating until 2005.

Between 1947 and 1952, a housing estate was developed as part of the Warsaw Housing Cooperative, between Madalińskiego Street, Wołoska Street, Wiktorska Street, and Independence Avenue. It consisted of modernist mid-rise apartment buildings, and housed around 10,000 people.

In 1950, the Mausoleum Cemetery of the Soviet Soldiers was opened at 51 Żwirki i Wigury Street in Wyględów, as a burial place for over 21,000 soldiers of the Red Army, who died during the Second World War. It became the first monument in Warsaw dedicated to soldiers who died in the conflict, and the largest cemetery dedicated to the Soviet soldiers in Poland.

In 1950, the Moskwa cinema was opened at 19 Puławska Street in Old Mokotów, becoming the largest of its kind in the city. It was closed down and demolished in 1996.

In 1951, Warsaw was divided into 11 city districts, including Mokotów, which encompassed the Upper Mokotów, Sielce, Szopy Polskie, and the western part of the modern Ursynów, mostly to the west of Puławska Street. It was named after the neighbourhood of Old Mokotów. On 1 January 1960, it was combined with the Wilanów district, keeping the former name. On 2 April 1990, the district was transformed into the municipality of Warsaw-Mokotów. On 19 June 1994, it was disestablished, with its northern portion being incorporated into the municipality of Warsaw-Centre, becoming its subdivision as the Mokotów district. The municipality was disestablished on 27 October 2002, with Mokotów becoming again a city district of Warsaw. The neighbourhood of Służew was divided into two parts with its northern portion remaining within Mokotów. Its historical portion in the south, known as Stary Służew (lit. 'Old Służew'), became part of Ursynów. It included the St. Cathrine Church and the Służew Old Cemetery, among other historical buildings.

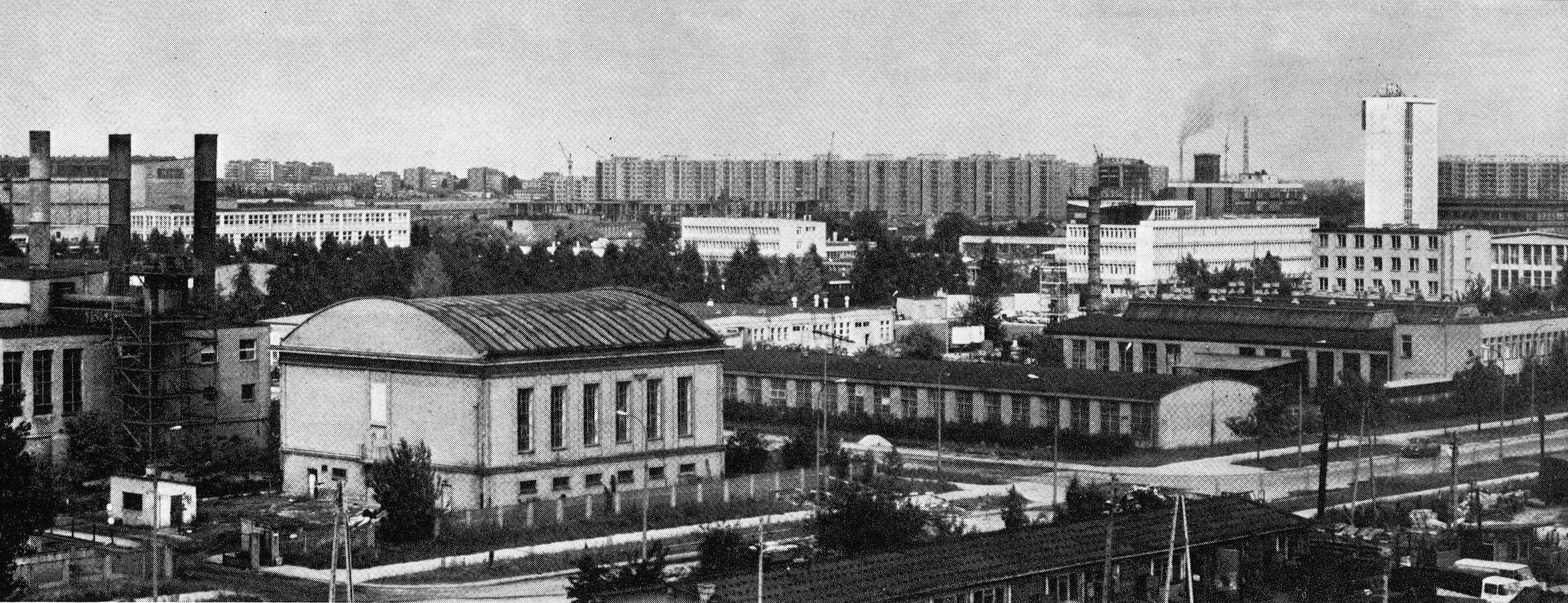
The industrial buildings in the industrial district of Służewiec, founded in 1951. Photography made in the 1970s.

In 1951, the area of Służewiec, Zbarż, and Wyczółki, was designated to become the Industrial and Storage District of Służewiec (Polish: Dzielnica Przemysłowo-Składowa „Służewiec”), later known as Służewiec Przemysłowy (Industrial Służewiec). It was envisioned to feature 60 factories and industrial plants. The construction begun in 1952, and utilized the large panel system technique, marking it as one of the first instances of its usage in Poland. The designated area covered around 2.6 km^{2} (1 sq mi). In the early 1970s, around 20,000 people were employed in the industrial district.

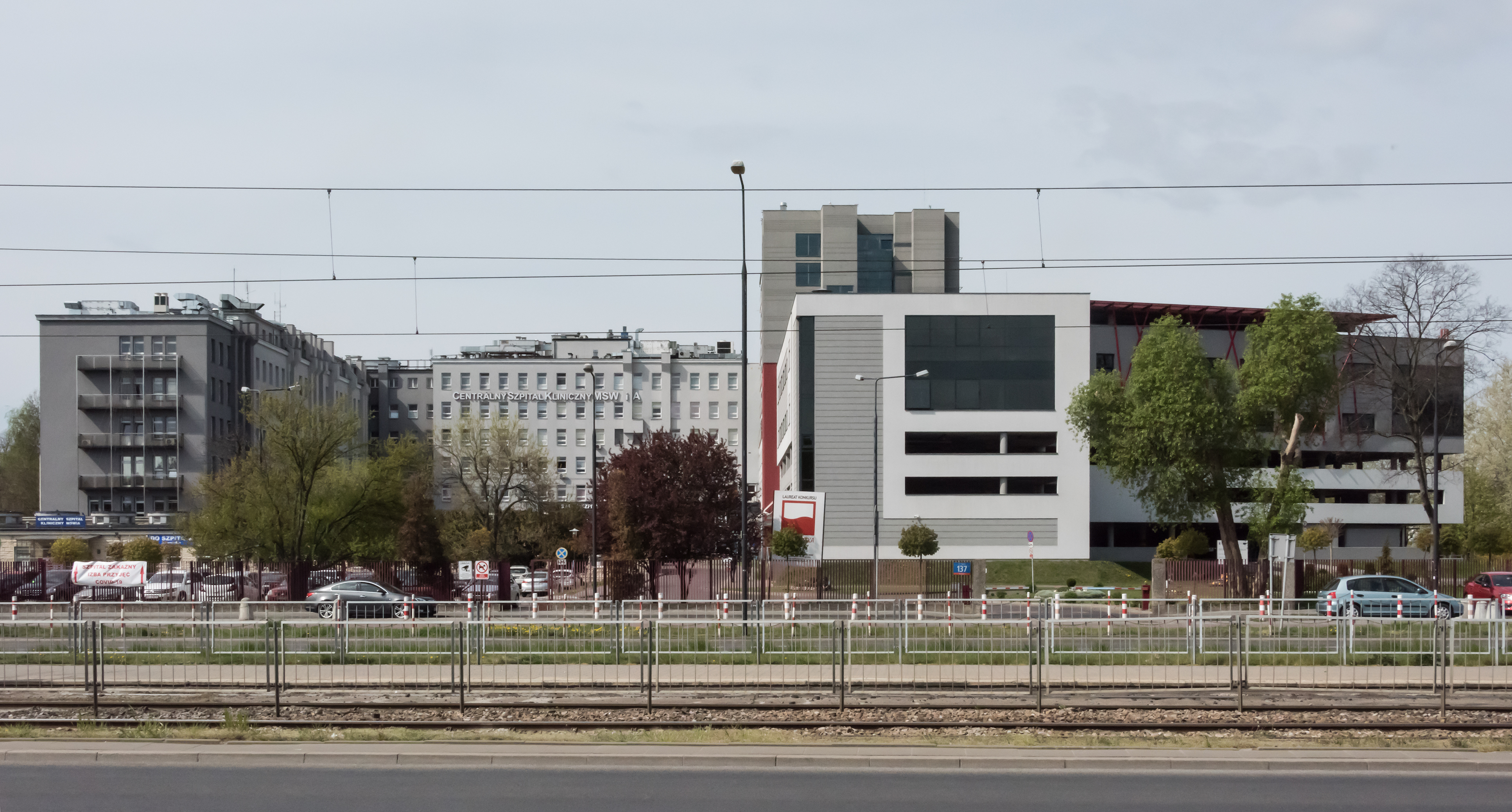
The State Medical Institute of the Ministry of Interior and Administration, opened in 1951.

In 1951, the Central Clinical Hospital of the Ministry of Interior (now known as the State Medical Institute of the Ministry of Interior and Administration), was opened at 137 Wołoska Street in Wyględów. In 1962, the National Institute of Geriatrics, Rheumatology and Rehabilitation was also opened nearby at 1 Spartańska Street.

In 1951, the Institute of Organisation and Mechanisation of Construction was founded. It was renamed in 1973 to the Institute of Construction Mechanisation, and again in 1986, to the Institute of Mechanised Construction and Rock Mining, becoming a research facility for the mechanisation of construction, and development of machinery for construction, road, building materials industry and rock mining. It had its headquarters at 6 and 8 Racjonalizacji Street in Służewiec. It operated until 2023, when it merged with the Institute of Precision Mechanics to form the Warsaw Institute of Technology, with its headquarters in the Żoliborz district.

In 1952, the Institute of Haematology and Transfusion Medicine (known until 1992 as the Institute of Haematology), a state research facility of haematology and transfusion medicine was founded at 5 Chocimska Street in Old Mokotów. In 2006, its headquarters were moved to 14 Indiry Gandhi Street in Ursynów, with its old building still remaining operational. In 1953, the Holy Family Specialist Hospital was also opened at 25 Madalińskiego Street.

In 1953, the Institute of Physics of the Polish Academy of Sciences was founded with headquarters at 32 and 46 Lotników Avenue in Służew. It is a research facility focused on solid-state and atomic physics. In 1966, the Institute of Electronic Technologies was also founded with headquarters in the same building complex. In 2020, it was joined with the Institute of Electronic Technologies and Materials, forming the Łukasiewicz Institute of Microelectronics and Photonics, which conducts research on advanced materials, micro- and nanoelectronics and photonics. In 1955, the Central Laboratory of Agricultural Industry was opened at 36 Rakowiecka Street, as a subsidiary of the Institute of Distilling Technology and Renewable Energy Sources in Bydgoszcz, Poland. In 1983, the laboratory was incorporated into the structures of the Institute of the Fermentation Industry, which in 1988 was transformed into the Institute of Biotechnology and the Agricultural and Food Industry. In 2009, it was combined with the Institute of Meat and Fat Industry and the Institute of Sugar Industry, forming the Institute of Agricultural and Food Biotechnological Industry.

In 1953, the Mokotów trams depot was opened at 27 Woronicza Street In 1959, the Woronicza bus depot was also opened on the other side of the road, at 29 Woronicza Street. In 1961, the neighbourhood was connected to the tram network, with tracks built alongside Wołoska and Marynarska Streets, and ending with a turning loop near Suwak Street. In 1962, the Warszawa Służewiec railway station, was opened at Logarytmiczna Street. In 1956, the tram tracks were opened alongside Independence Avenue, connecting with network on Rakowiecka Street. In 1961, the tracks were also built alongside Wołoska Street. In 1969, the tracks were removed from Rakowiecka Street, between the intersections with Independence Avenue and Puławska Street.

In 1955, the housing estate of Ksawerów was developed alongside Puławska Street, consisting of tenement houses. It was designed by Wacław Kłyszewski, Jerzy Mokrzyński, and Eugeniusz Wierzbicki. The same year, the National Film Archive was founded as the organisation of the Ministry of Culture and National Heritage, with the headquarters at 61 Puławska Street in Old Mokotów. In 2005, the ministry also established the Polish Audiovisual Publishing House, with its headquarters at 3 and 5 Wałbrzyska Street in Służew. In 2009, it was restructured into the National Audiovisual Institute, tasked with the digitisation, sharing and promotion of Polish audiovisual heritage. In 2017, both organisations were merged, forming the National Film Archive and Audiovisual Institute, becoming one of the largest archives of film and audio in Europe. It continued to headquartered at 3 and 5 Wałbrzyska Street.

Around 1955, a national headquarters building of the Citizens' Militia, the national police organisation, was built at 148 and 150 Puławska Street in Ksawerów. In 1990, the building became headquarters of the Police, which replaced the Citizens' Militia.

In 1957, the headquarters building of the Polish Radio, a national public-service radio broadcasting organisation, was opened at 77 and 85 Independence Avenue in Wierzbno. Originally, it was used as a broadcasting station of its international auditions. In 1958, it became the headquarters and main broadcasting station of Polish Radio.

In 1959, the Warsaw Ski Jumping Hill, a small hill ski jumping venue, with the construction point at 38 m (124.67 ft), was opened at 3 Czerniowiecka Street on the Warsaw Escarpment. It was operated by the Warsaw Ski Club, and was mostly used as a training venue and occasionally hosted ski jumping competitions. It was modernised between 1975 and 1980. The last competition was hosted there in 1989, and it continued to serve as a training venue until the early 1990s, after which it stopped being used. The ski jumping hill was deconstructed between 2010 and 2011.

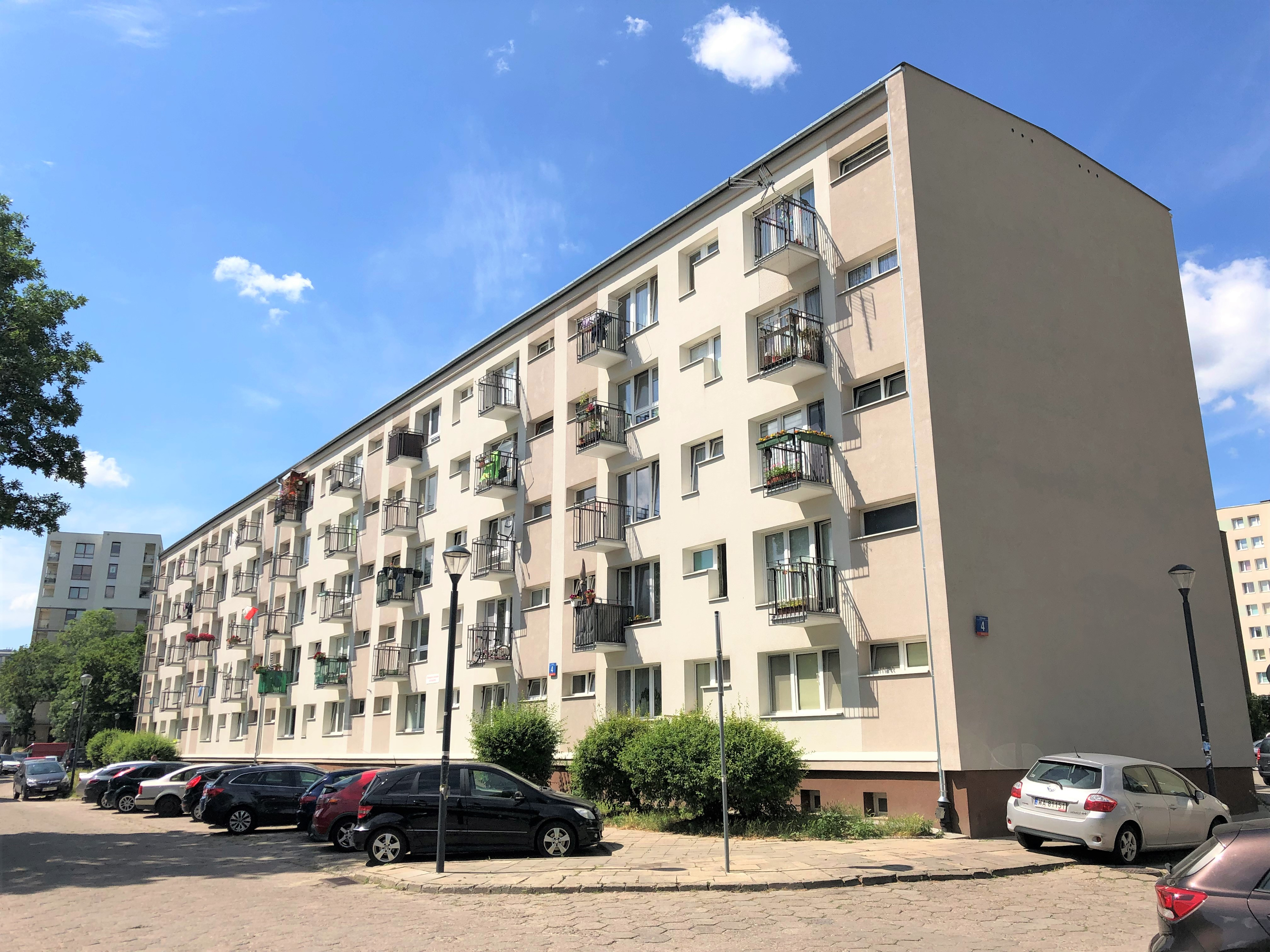
One of the apartment buildings of the housing estate of Służewiec-Prototypy built in the 1960s.

Between the 1950s and the 1970s, several large housing estates were developed across Upper Mokotów. They consisted of apartment buildings, developed using the large panel system technology. It begun with the construction of the housing estate of Wierzbno between 1956 and 1968. It was followed by Służewiec-Prototypy in the southeast, developed between 1960 and 1965, as a test ground for new technologies and urbanist solutions. Later, the development also included Osiedle Batorego in the northeast, Ksawerów, Skarpa Puławska, and Skocznia in the central east, Służew Fort, and Służew nad Dolinką in the southeast, and the neighbourhood of the Politechnika Construction and Housing Association in the northwest.

In 1961, the headquarters of the Łukasiewicz Institute of Ceramics and Building Materials of the Łukasiewicz Research Network, then known as the Institute of Glass and Ceramics Industry, were moved to 9 Postępu Street in Służewiec. Currently, it is a national research institute of processing of nonmetal resources, including the manufacture of ceramics and building materials, mineral binding agents, and concrete.

In 1962, Supersam, the first supermarket store in Poland, was opened at 2 Puławska Street, next to the Union of Lublin Square. It was considered an notable example of the modernist architecture in Poland. The building was demolished in 2006.

In 1962, the Warszawianka sports complex was opened in the area of Merliniego Street on the Warsaw Escarpment. Among its amenities, it included an association football pitch and tennis courts. Between 1960 and 1973, the complex was expanded with outdoor and indoor swimming pools. Since its opening, it served as the home field of the KS Warszawianka sports team. The complex was designed by architects Jerzy Sołtan and Zbigniew Ihnatowicz. It had degraded over the following decades, with its sections becoming abandoned and disused. In the 1990s, the new indoor swimming pool complex was opened. The old outdoor swimming pools were demolished, and overbuilt with a residential area.

In 1967, the Gwardia Warsaw multi-sport club began using a sports complex at 132 Racławicka Street as its headquarters. It included an association football field, which became its station. From 1972 to 1985, the complex also included a public swimming pool. From 1993 to 1996, and from 1999 to 2003, it also served a motorcycle speedway venue. The sports complex was closed down in 2012, with the club moving to a different venue. Currently, it is planned to build in its place the new headquarters building for Frontex, an agency of the European Union, which exercises the border control of the Schengen Area.

Between 1968 and 1970, the Arcadia Park was developed in the garden area surrounding the Rabbit House, between Puławska Street, Żywnego Street, Piaseczyńska Street, and Idzikowskiego Street. It was designed by Longin Majdecki.

In 1969, the Radio and Television Centre was opened at 17 Woronicza Street in Ksawerów, as the headquarters of Polish Television, a state media public broadcasting television network. The current headquarters building in the complex was built in 2007.

In the 1960s, the Służew Little Valley Park was developed to the south of the housing estate of Służew nad Dolinką, alongside Służew Stream, and Dolina Służewska Street.

In 1970, the Guliwer Puppet Theatre moved in to the building at 16 Różana Street in Old Mokotów.

In 1978, the Faculty of Management of the University of Warsaw was moved to two buildings at 1 and 3 Szturmowa Street. It was the first university faculty in Poland dedicated to the management education. The campus was expanded with third building opened in 2002, with the former two being renovated between 2004 and 2005.

Between 1979 and 1988, the St. Maximilian Maria Kolbe Church, belonging to the Catholic denomination, was constructed at 35 Rzymowskiego Street.

Throughout the 1970s and 1980s, the area of the former Mokotów Aerodrome was developed into a large urban park, known as the Mokotów Field. Its construction begun in 1977, and it was opened in sections, that were finished in 1983, 1986, and 1991. Currently, majority of its area is encompassed within the Downtown and Ochota districts, with only its small southwestern portion being within the Mokotów district.

Between 1980 and 1989, the St. Andrew Bobola Sanctuary was constructed at 61 Rakowiecka Street in Old Mokotów, as the seat of Roman Catholic parish, operated by the Jesuit Order. It was built in a former location of a Jesuit chapel built there in 1935, and destroyed in 1944 during the Second World War. The building also begun housing one of two campuses of the Catholic Academy of Warsaw, a university of theology.

=== Democratic period ===
Between 1982 and 1996, the Church of the Holy Virgin Mary the Mother of Church was built at 20 Domaniewska Street, as a seat of a Roman Catholic parish in Ksawerów. Since 2015, it also hosts the Blessed Bishop Nicholas Charnetsky Parish of the Greek Catholic Church in Poland. Between 1987 and 2000, the Madonna of Angels Church was built at 98A Modzelewskiego Street in Wierzbno. It became seat of a Roman Catholic parish founded in 1983, operated by the Order of Friars Minor. The St. Stephen Church was also built between 1998 and 2003 at 1 Św. Szczepana Street in Old Mokotów. Its parish was founded in 1949, and previously was based in chapel in the Lubomirski Palace in Downtown.

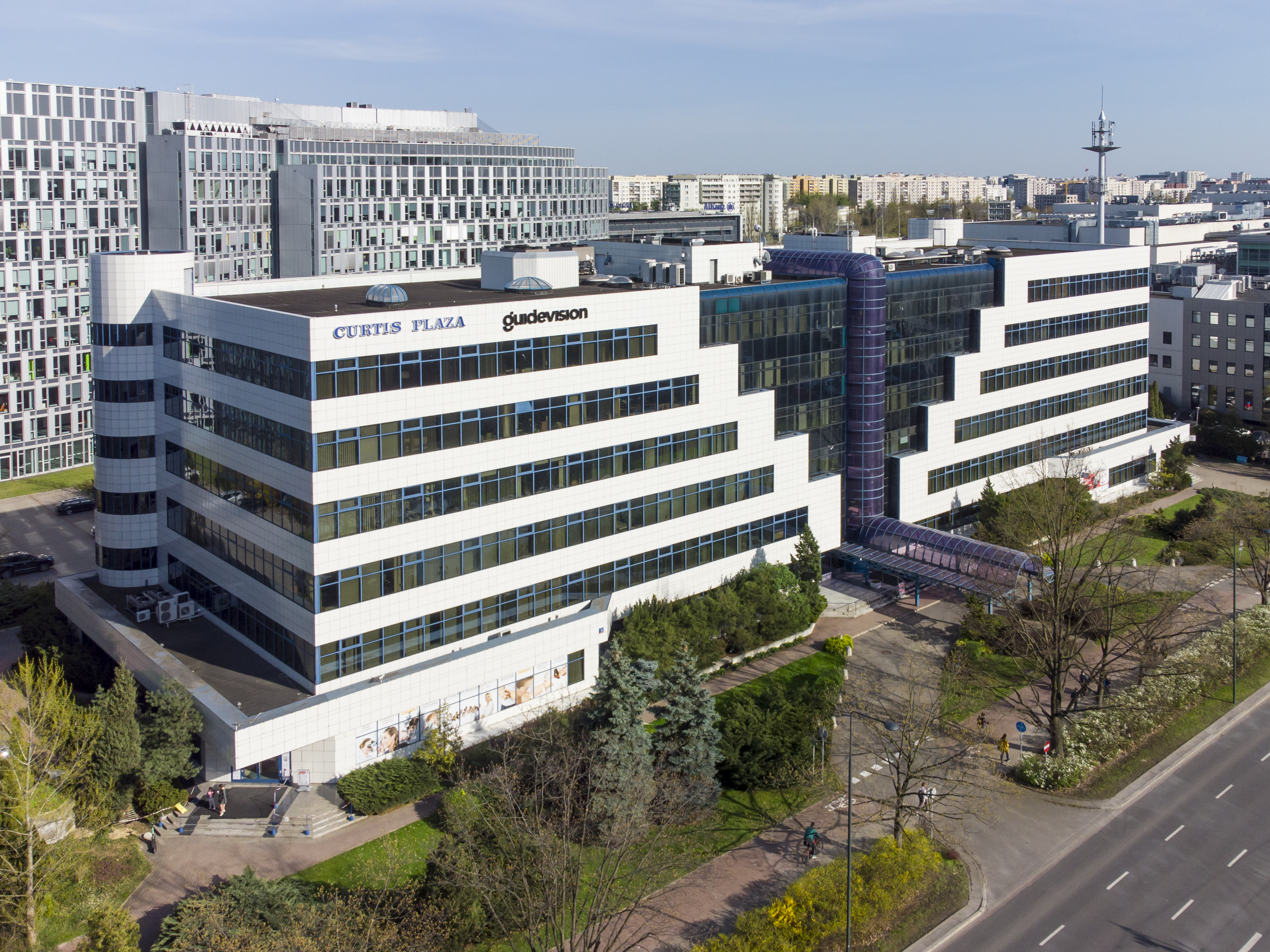
Curtis Plaza, one of the first office buildings in the financial district of Mordor, constructed in 1992, and demolished in 2024.

In the 1990s, the manufacturing industry left the area, leading to the emergence of a financial district, with the development of large office complexes, eventually becoming the largest in Poland. In 1992, Curtis Plaza, located at 18 Wołoska Street at the boundary of Służewiec and Ksawerów, became one of the first office buildings constructed in the area. It was considered a prime example of postmodern architecture in the city, and was eventually demolished in 2024. The Mokotów Business Park, at Domaniewska Street, built between 1995 and 2001, became another example of an office building complex built in the neighbourhood. In 2000, Westfield Mokotów (originally known as Galeria Mokotów), one of the largest shopping centres in the city, was opened at 12 Wołoska Street. By 2019, the area included 83 office buildings, which were mostly constructed without city oversight and contributed to the development of an office monoculture. In 2015, the area had been estimated to have between 80 and 100 thousand people commuting to work there, in comparison to around 15,000 residents. The large number of daily commuters, together with local road systems not designed for such volume of traffic, caused regular traffic congestion and lack of availability of parking space in the area, leading to the financial district being colloquially known as Mordor and Mordor on Domaniewska Street. The name referenced Mordor, a fictional location, and personification of evil, from the 1954 fantasy novel The Lord of the Rings written by J. R. R. Tolkien. In 2020, following the petition of local inhabitants, two small streets in the neighbourhood were named after Tolkien and Gandalf, one of the main characters from the book. The traffic situation eventually improved in the 2020s, with the development of new roads, improvement of public transit, and decrease of office space presence in the area.

The high-rise residential buildings begun being constructed in the former industrial area of Służewiec in the 1990s, alongside office buildings. While, the region was dominated by office spaces, and considered the largest financial district in Poland, it begun losing its status to the Wola district in 2019, with the last office building being built there in 2020. Since then, the number of rented office spaces begun to steadily decrease, as the neighbourhood begun transforming into a housing area, with the development of new housing estates throughout the early 2020s, with the estimated population of 31,000 in 2025.

In 1993, the Interdisciplinary Centre for Mathematical and Computational Modelling, a supercomputing and research data centre of the University of Warsaw was founded, with its administrative headquarters located at 15 and 17 Tyniecka Street, and the supercomputers being housed in the building at 32 Kupiecka Street in the Białołęka district.

On 7 April 1995, the M1 line of the Warsaw Metro underground rapid transit system was opened crossing Upper Mokotów with the stations of Pole Mokotowskie, Racławicka, Służew, Wierzbno, and Wilanowska. The Wilanowska station hosted the ceremony of opening the M1 metro line. It was opened by Józef Oleksy, the Prime Minister of Poland, Marcin Święcicki, the mayor of Warsaw, and Jan Podoski, an engineer who proposed and initiated the construction of the metro line.

The same year, the University of Technology and Arts in Applied Sciences, until 2024 known as the University of Ecology and Management, was opened at 12 Olszewska Street in Old Mokotów, as a private university. In 2002, the campus of Łazarski University was also opened at 43 Świeradowska Street in Służew.

On 4 October 1996, the Mokotów district was subdivided into twelve City Information System areas, with Upper Mokotów forming its western side including the areas of Ksawerów, Old Mokotów, Służew, Służewiec, Wierzbno and Wyględów.

In 1997, the Iluzjon arthouse cinema, which was operated since the 1950s by the National Film Archive (now National Film Archive and Audiovisual Institute), adopted new headquarters at 50A Narbutta Street in Old Mokotów. The building was opened in 1949, originally housing the Stolica cinema.

In 1999, the building of the Faculty of Materials Science and Engineering of the Warsaw University of Technology was opened at 141 Wołoska Street in Wyględów.

In 2001, two administrative neighbourhoods governed by locally elected councils were founded in the area. They were Służewiec Fort, including the neighbourhood of Służew Fort and the Institute of Physics of the Polish Academy of Sciences, and Służewiec Południowy (South Służewiec), which consisted of Służewiec-Prototypy, and the southern portion of Służewiec Przemysłowy. Służewiec Fort was abolished in 2016.

Between 2003 and 2006, the gated community known as Marina Mokotów, was developed in the southwestern portion of Wyględów, between Żwirki i Wigury, Racławicka, Miłobędzka, Etiudy Rewolucyjnej, and Woronicza Streets. It consisted of modernist apartment buildings, which could house around 5,000 people. An artificial pond was also created in the neighbourhood. Between 2002 and 2013, a collection of five housing estates, known as Eko Park was developed in the northeastern portion of Wyględów. It consisted of modernist apartment buildings.

In 2008, the New Theatre was founded at 10 and 16 Madalińskiego Street in Old Mokotów, in a former machine workshop building dating to 1927.

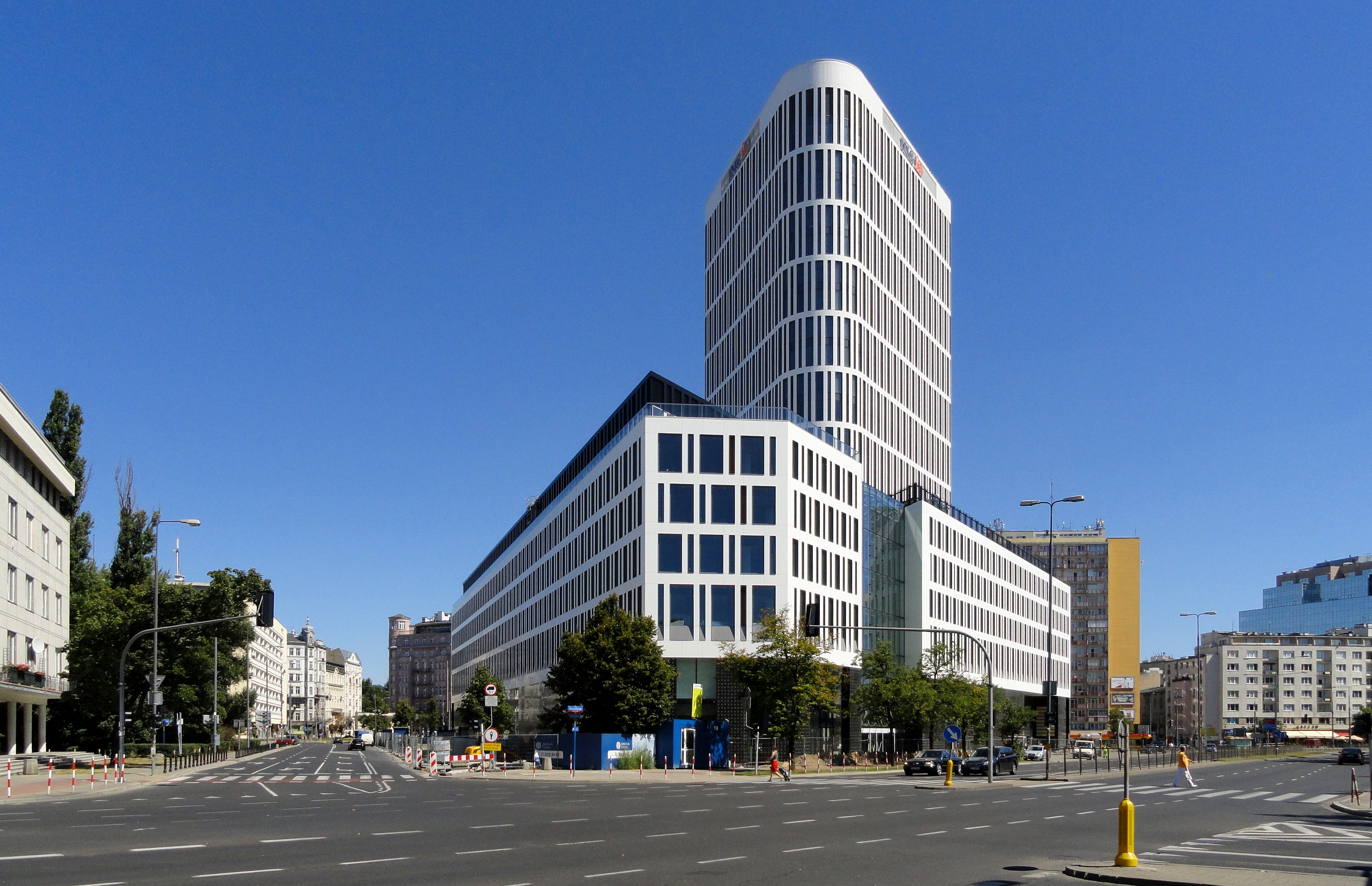
Plac Unii office building and shopping mall, opened in 2013.

In 2013, the skyscraper Plac Unii was opened at 2 Puławska Street near the Union of Lublin Square in Old Mokotów. It has 22 stories, with the total height of 90 m (295.28 ft), and houses offices and a shopping mall. It was built in place of the former Supersam supermarket.

In 2014, the Służew House of Culture community centre was opened at 15 Bacha Street, near the Służew Pond. The modernist complex was designed to resemble a small village, with several wooden pavilions including amenities such as several rooms, amphitheatre, play area, and a barn with animals. Before its opening, the community centre was housed in repurposed cargo containers that had been used since 1993. In 2015, the World Peace Bell was unveiled nearby. It was a copy of the artwork from 1989, displayed at 55 Bukowińska Street, which was stolen in 2002. The original was one of 50 identical bells, gifted by Hiroshima and Nagasaki in Japan, which were destroyed in 1945 atomic bombings, to numerous cities across the globe, as a symbol of world peace.

In 2018, the Academy of Justice, originally known as the Higher School of Justice, was founded 50 Wiśniowa Street in Old Mokotów, as a division of the Prison Service.

In March 2020, as part of the measures taken during the COVID-19 pandemic, the Central Clinical Hospital of the Ministry of Interior and Administration was converted to specialise in treating the disease. In December 2020, the hospital staff became first people in Poland to receive the COVID-19 vaccine. In January 2023, the hospital was transformed into the State Medical Institute of the Ministry of Interior and Administration. Aside from providing healthcare, it also became a research institute. Additionally, it was designated to provide healthcare to the most important people in the government, including the president and the prime minister, as well as international delegates.

In October 2024, a tram line was opened alongside Spacerowa Street, connecting the network between Puławska Street and Wilanów Town. In December 2025, the tram tracks were rebuilt alongside Rackowiecka Street, between the intersections of Independence Avenue and Puławska Street.

== Housing and economy ==
Upper Mokotów is a residential arearesidential area which predominantly consists of mid- and high-rise housing estates with apartment buildings. It includes the neighborhoods of Ksawerów, Old Mokotów, Służew, Służewiec, Wierzbno, and Wyględów. It also includes low-rise areas with single-family housing, including in the neighbourhoods of Old Mokotów, Królikarnia, Służew-Parcele, and Wierzbno.

The southwestern portion of the Upper Mokotów includes a financial district, contained within the neighbourhoods of Służewiec and Ksawerów. It consists of office building complexes, and houses headquarters of numerous domestic companies, and branches of many multinational corporations. The area is colloquially referred to as Mordor, and Mordor at Domaniewska, reference to Mordor, a fictional location, and personification of evil, from the 1954 fantasy novel The Lord of the Rings written by J. R. R. Tolkien. It was originally coined as a critique of the terrible road traffic conditions in the area in the 2010s. While the number of rented office spaces in the area had been in decline since 2020, it used to be the largest financial district in Poland from its emergence in the 1990s to 2019, at its peak, including 83 office buildings. The area also includes Westfield Mokotów, one of the largest shopping malls in the city, located at 12 Wołoska Street. In the north, Upper Mokotów also features the skyscraper Plac Unii, located at 2 Puławska Street near the Union of Lublin Square. It has 22 stories, with a total height of 90 m (295.28 ft), and houses offices and a shopping mall.

== Science, higher education, and healthcare ==
=== Science and healthcare ===
The Institute of Physics of the Polish Academy of Sciences.

Upper Mokotów includes several state-owned research institutes. Among them are the Institute of Physics of the Polish Academy of Sciences focused on solid-state and atomic physics, and Łukasiewicz Institute of Microelectronics and Photonics, focused on micro- and nanoelectronics and photonics, and the Institute of Ceramics and Building Materials of the Łukasiewicz Research Network, focused on the nonmetal resources. It also includes the Institute of Agricultural and Food Biotechnological Industry, the Institute of Haematology and Transfusion Medicine, the National Institute of Geriatrics, Rheumatology and Rehabilitation, the National Institute of Public Health, and the Polish Geological Institute. Old Mokotów also includes the Stanisław Konopka Central Medical Library, located at 22 Chocimska Street, which operates as a research library of the Ministry of Health, aiming to collect all Polish literature in the field of medicine and related sciences, as well as the most important works of world medical literature. Additionally, Wierzbno houses the administrative headquarters of the Interdisciplinary Centre for Mathematical and Computational Modelling, a supercomputing and research data centre of the University of Warsaw, located at 15 and 17 Tyniecka Street. Its supercomputers are housed in the building at 32 Kupiecka Street in the Białołęka district.

Upper Mokotów features the State Medical Institute of the Ministry of Interior and Administration, located at 137 Wołoska Street in Wyględów, which operates as the hospital and medical research institute. It is also designated to provide healthcare to the most important people in the national government, including the president and the prime minister, as well as international delegates. It also includes the Holy Family Specialist Hospital, and the Luxmed St. Elizabeth Hospital. The latter forms one of the largest private hospitals in Poland.

=== Higher education ===
Old Mokotów houses the campus of the SGH Warsaw School of Economics, with its headquarters located at 162 Independence Avenue. The neighbourhood also includes a campus of the Warsaw University of Technology, located at 84, 85, and 86 Nurbutta Street, housing the Faculty of Automotive and Construction Machinery Engineering, and the Faculty of Mechanical Engineering. Additionally, the Faculty of Materials Science and Engineering is also headquartered at 141 Wołoska Street in Wyględów. Furthermore, the neighbourhood of Służew includes the Faculty of Management of the University of Warsaw at 1 and 3 Szturmowa Street. Additionally, the area of Upper Mokotów also includes two campuses of private universities. They are the University of Technology and Arts in Applied Sciences, located at 12 Olszewska Street in Old Mokotów, and the Łazarski University located at 43 Świeradowska Street in Służew. Wierzbno also has the School of Education of the Polish–American Freedom Foundation and the University of Warsaw, which, jointly operated by both organisations, is a graduate school for teachers, housed at 15 and 17 Tynicka Street.

== Culture ==
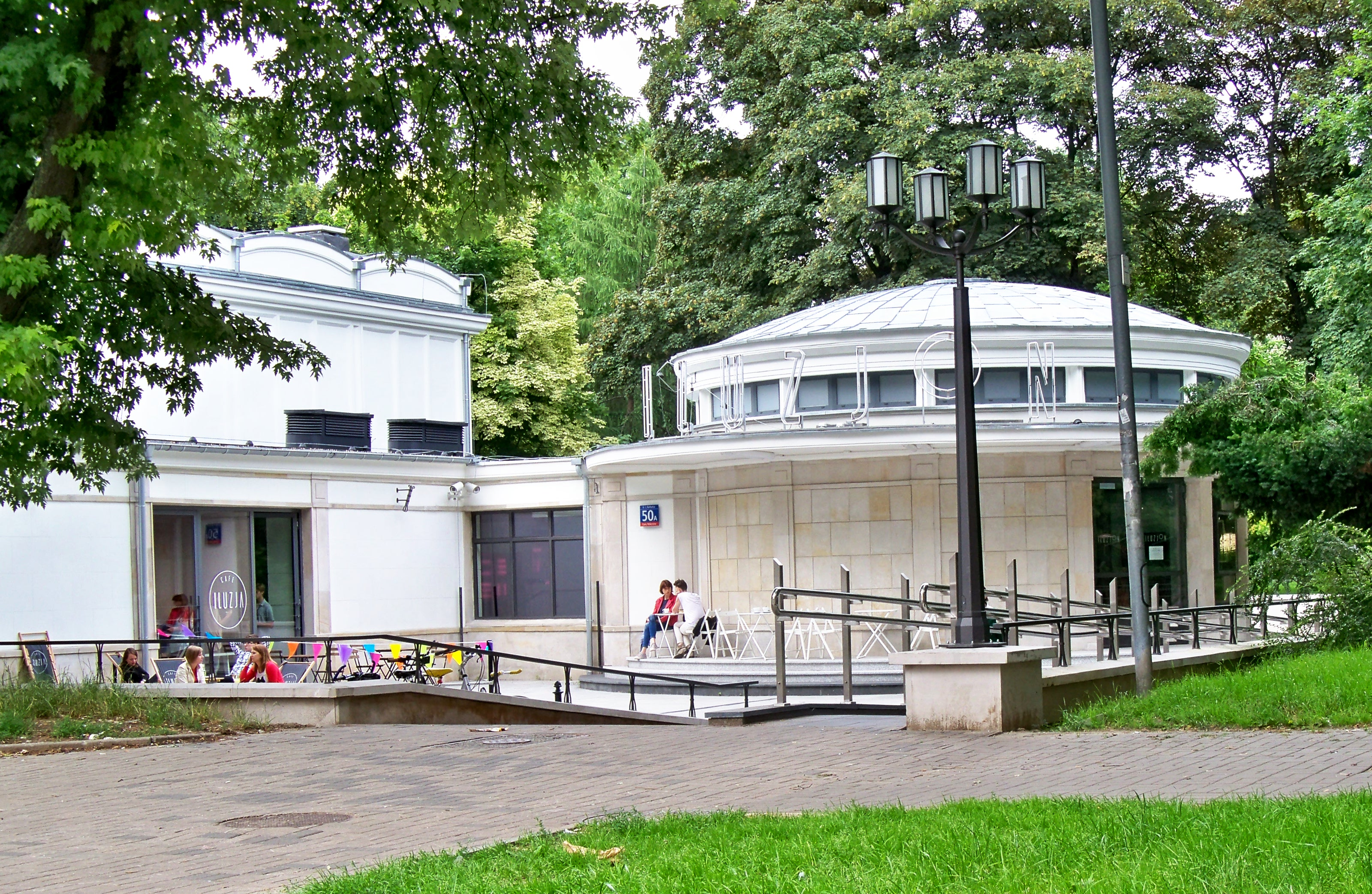
The Iluzjon arthouse cinema.

Upper Mokotów includes several museal institutions. Among them, the neighbourhood of Old Mokotów features the Geological Museum of the State Institute of Geology, and the Museum of the Cursed Soldiers and the Political Prisoners of the Polish People's Republic. The latter is operated in the former building of the Mokotów Prison, and is dedicated to the history of the Polish anti-communist resistance fighters and the members and organisations of the dissident movement opposing the People's Republic of Poland and the Soviet control of the country. The neighbourhood also features the Władysław Broniewski Museum, forming a division of the Adam Mickiewicz Museum of Literature. It is housed in a villa at 51 Dąbrowskiego 51 Street, and is dedicated to Władysław Broniewski (1987–1962), a 20th-century poet, writer, translator and soldier, known for his revolutionary and patriotic writings. To the south, the neighbourhood of Ksawerów features s the Rabbit House, a historic neoclassical palace residence dating to 1786, placed at 113A Puławska Street. It houses the Xawery Dunikowski Museum of Sculpture, which is a branch of the Warsaw National Museum. Surrounding it garden forms the Sculpture Park (Polish: Park Rzeźby), which features the museal exponents. Additionally, the neighbourhood also includes the Yellow Tavern, a historic building from 1853, located at 204 Wilanowska Avenue, which houses the Museum of the Polish Peasant Movement, and the Ksawerów Manor House, a historic neoclassical residence dating to 1840, is placed at 13 Ksawerów Street. The neighbourhood of Służewiec also features the Tram Tradition Chamber, the museum of the history of trams in Warsaw, housed in the Mokotów tram depot.

Among other historic buildings in Upper Mokotów are the Szuster Palace, a Gothic Revival palace residence in Old Mokotów built in 1774, and Fanshawe Palace, a neoclassical residence in Wierzbno built around 1850. The Mokotów Tollhouses, two neoclassical tollhouse pavilions built in 1818 are also present at Union of Lublin Square in Old Mokotów. Its western pavilion houses a museum dedicated to Sue Ryder, a British volunteer with Special Operations Executive in the Second World War, and a member of the First Aid Nursing Yeomanry, who afterwards established charitable organisations, notably the Sue Ryder Foundation (now known simply as Sue Ryder). The neighbourhood also features the Church of the Ascension of the Lord, a Lutheran eclectic temple dating to 1904. It also includes the historic the 20th-centaury residential buildings, such as the Wedel House, an International Style tenement built in 1936, and the Scarab Beetle House, a historic modernist villa built in 1934. Upper Mokotów also includes tow historic 19th-century decommissioned and partially demolished fortifications. They are Fort M "Mokotów" in the northeast and Fort VIIA "Służewiec" in the southeast, dating to 1883 and 1886, respectively. The former forms a park and recreational complex, with restaurants and event venue.

The Służew House of Culture, a community centre is housed in a complex consists of several wooden pavilions in the Służew Little Valley Park. It has amenities such as several rooms, amphitheatre, play area, and a barn with animals. The World Peace Bell is also placed nearby. Unveiled in 2015, it is a copy of a 1989 bell gifted by Hiroshima and Nagasaki to the city, as a symbol of world peace, stolen in 2002. The neighbourhood of Old Mokotów also features several performing arts institutions, including the New Theatre, the Guliwer Puppet Theatre, and the Iluzjon arthouse cinema of the National Film Archive and Audiovisual Institute. The neighbourhood also includes the Stanisław Moniuszko Warsaw Musical Association, housed in the Szuster Palace, and dedicated to the propagation of the musical culture. The National Film Archive and Audiovisual Institute, one of the largest archives of film and audio in Europe, is also located in Old Mokotów.

Upper Mokotów houses the headquarters of the Polish Television, a state media public broadcasting television network, and Polish Radio, a national public-service radio broadcasting organisation.

The hymn "Marsz Mokotowa" (lit. 'The Mokotów March') is widely considered as an unofficial anthem of the neighbourhood of Old Mokotów and the entire city district of Mokotów. It was created in 1944, with lyrics written by Mirosław Jezierski and music composed by Jan Markowski, both of whom served in the Home Army at the time. The song is performed on bells every day on 17:00 from the 18th-century clock tower known as the Gothic House, located in the Eye of the Sea Park.

== Parks and recreation ==
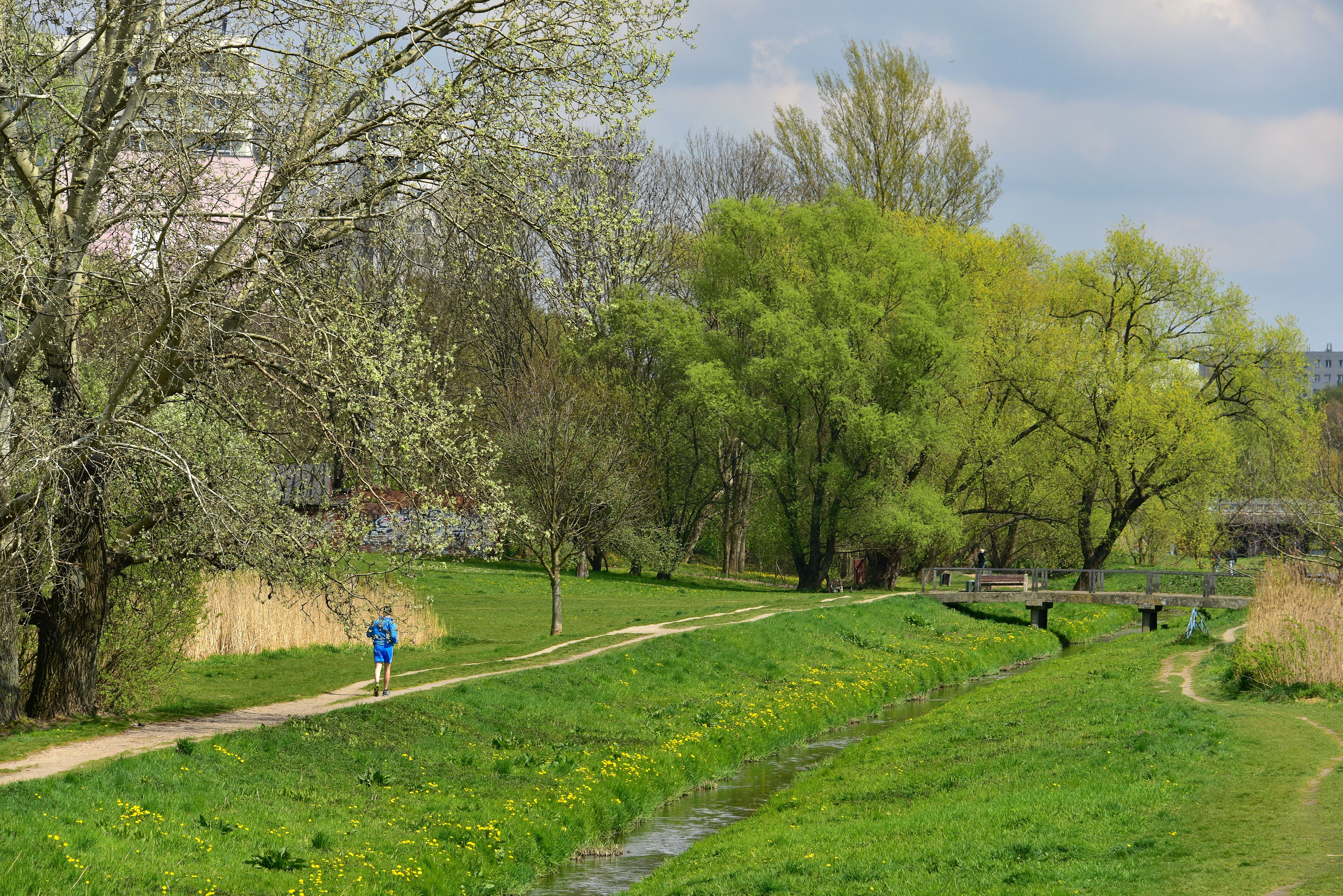
The Służew Little Valley Park.

Upper Mokotów features several public parks, such as Arcadia Park, Dreszer Park, Eye of the Sea Park, and Służew Little Valley Park. (Note: Attributed to multiple references:) It also has the Sculpture Park, which displays the museal exponents of the Xawery Dunikowski Museum of Sculpture, housed in the Rabbit House, placed in the centre of the garden. Upper Mokotów also features a small, southwest portion of the Mokotów Field, one of the largest park complexes in the city. The area also features the Mokotów Palm House at 4 Biały Kamień Street, which contains numerous exotic plants, including more than a century-old palm trees and figs, and the Warsaw University of Life Sciences Park, a protected landscape park with an area of around 1.59 ha, restricted to the public. (Note: Attributed to multiple references:)

The Union of Lublin Square is also located at the boundary of Mokotów and Downtown district, forming an urban park and a roundabout at the intersection of Polna, Marszałkowska, Bagatela, Puławska, Klonowa, and Boya-Żeleńskiego Streets, and Szuch Avenue. It is a part of the historic urban street layout, developed in 1770, known as the Stanislavian Axis, after its initiator, king Stanisław August Poniatowski.

Moreover, the neighbourhood of Wyględów also features the Mausoleum Cemetery of the Soviet Soldiers, located at 51 Żwirki i Wigury Street, which forms the burial ground for over 21,000 soldiers of the Red Army, who died during the Second World War. It is the largest cemetery dedicated to the Soviet soldiers in Poland. It also includes a 21-metre-tall (68.89 ft) granite obelisk, and two sculptures of soldiers, The Heroism by Jerzy Jarnuszkiewicz, and The Sacrifice by Władysław Niemirski.

The neighbourhood of Wierzbno also includes the Warszawianka sports complex, located on Merliniego Street, on the Warsaw Escarpment. Its amenities include tennis courts, association football pitches, and an indoor swimming pool complex. It also houses the KS Warszawianka sports team.

== Nature ==
The Służewic Pond, the largest body of water in Upper Mokotów.

In the northeast, the neighbourhood of Old Mokotów features the Eye of the Sea pond, with an area of 0.44 ha, while in the southeast, the neighbourhood of Służew is crossed by Służewiec Stream through the Służew Little Valley Park and Służewiec Pond Park, stretching alongside Dolina Służewska Street. The several ponds are present alongside the stream, with the Służewiec Pond, with an area of 2.4 ha, being the largest among them. The eastern boundary of Upper Mokotów is marked by the peaks of the Warsaw Escarpment. Upper Mokotów also features several natural monuments in form of trees and Glacial erratic stones. Among them is the Second Standard-Bearers Rock, a glacial erratic made from biotite gneiss, with the height of 2.9 m (9.51 ft), the circumference of 8.5 m (27.89 ft), and the weight of around 30 t. It is placed on Wiśniowa Street in front of the Polish Geological Institute on 4 Rakowiecka Street. Discovered in 1938, it was the largest glacial erratic rock excavated in Warsaw until 2011.

== Religion and cemeteries ==
The St. Andrew Bobola Sanctuary, a Roman Catholic parish church.

Upper Mokotów features several Roman Catholic parish churches, including the Church of the Holy Virgin Mary the Mother of Church, St. Maximilian Maria Kolbe Church, the Saint Michael the Archangel Church, and St. Stephen Church. (Note: Attributed to multiple references:) It also includes the St. Dominic Church, adjusted to the St. Joseph Monastery of the Dominican Order, built in 1937, as well as the St. Andrew Bobola Sanctuary, operated by the Jesuit Order, the Holy Virgin Mary the Mother of Saviour Church, operated by the order of Salvatorians, and the Madonna of Angels Church, operated by the Order of Friars Minor. (Note: Attributed to multiple references:) The area also includes the St. Joseph Monastery of the Roman Catholic mendicant order of Discalced Carmelites. The building is also the headquarters of the Warsaw Province of the Most Holy Trinity, one of the two provinces of Discalced Carmelites in Poland.

Upper Mokotów also includes the Church of the Ascension of the Lord, a historic building built in 1904, which belongs to the Evangelical Church of the Augsburg Confession, as well as the seat and chapel of the Second Commune of the Church of Jesus Christ of Latter-day Saints in Warsaw, and the Kingdom Hall of Jehovah's Witnesses. Additionally, the Holy Virgin Mary the Mother of Church also hosts the Blessed Bishop Nicholas Charnetsky Parish of the Greek Catholic Church in Poland.

Additionally, the area includes the Służew New Cemetery at Wałbrzyska Streets, a historic Roman Catholic burial ground founded in the year 1900. Moreover, the Mausoleum Cemetery of the Soviet Soldiers, is also located at 51 Żwirki i Wigury Street, forming the burial ground for over 21,000 soldiers of the Red Army, who died during the Second World War. It is the largest cemetery dedicated to the Soviet soldiers in Poland.

== Transport ==
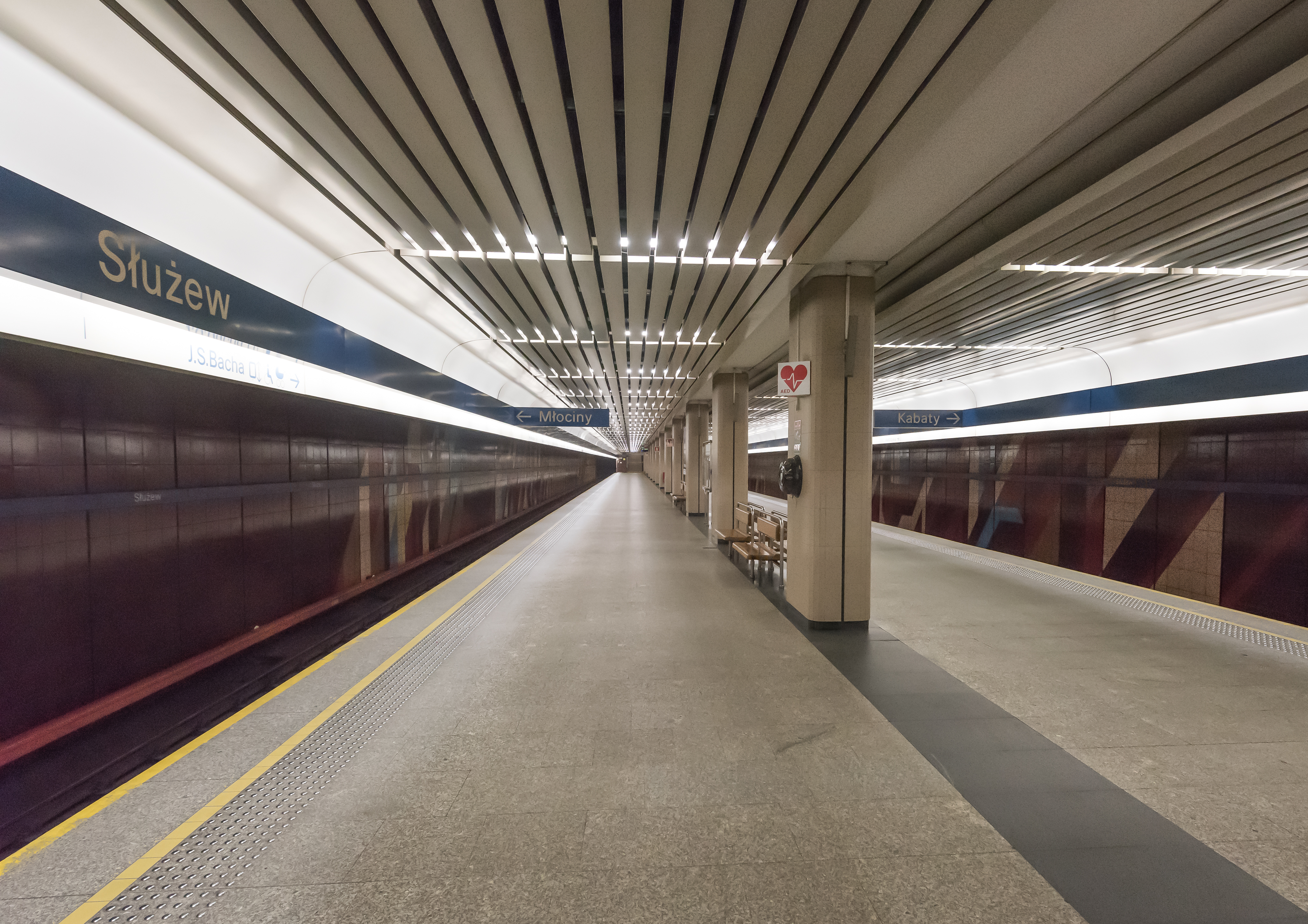
The Służew metro station.

Upper Mokotów has five stations of the M1 line of Warsaw Metro rapid transit underground system. They are: Pole Mokotowskie, Racławicka, Służew, Wierzbno, and Wilanowska. They area is also served by the tram network. It also includes the Mokotów tram depot and Woronicza bus depot, both located at Woronicza Street.

== Government ==
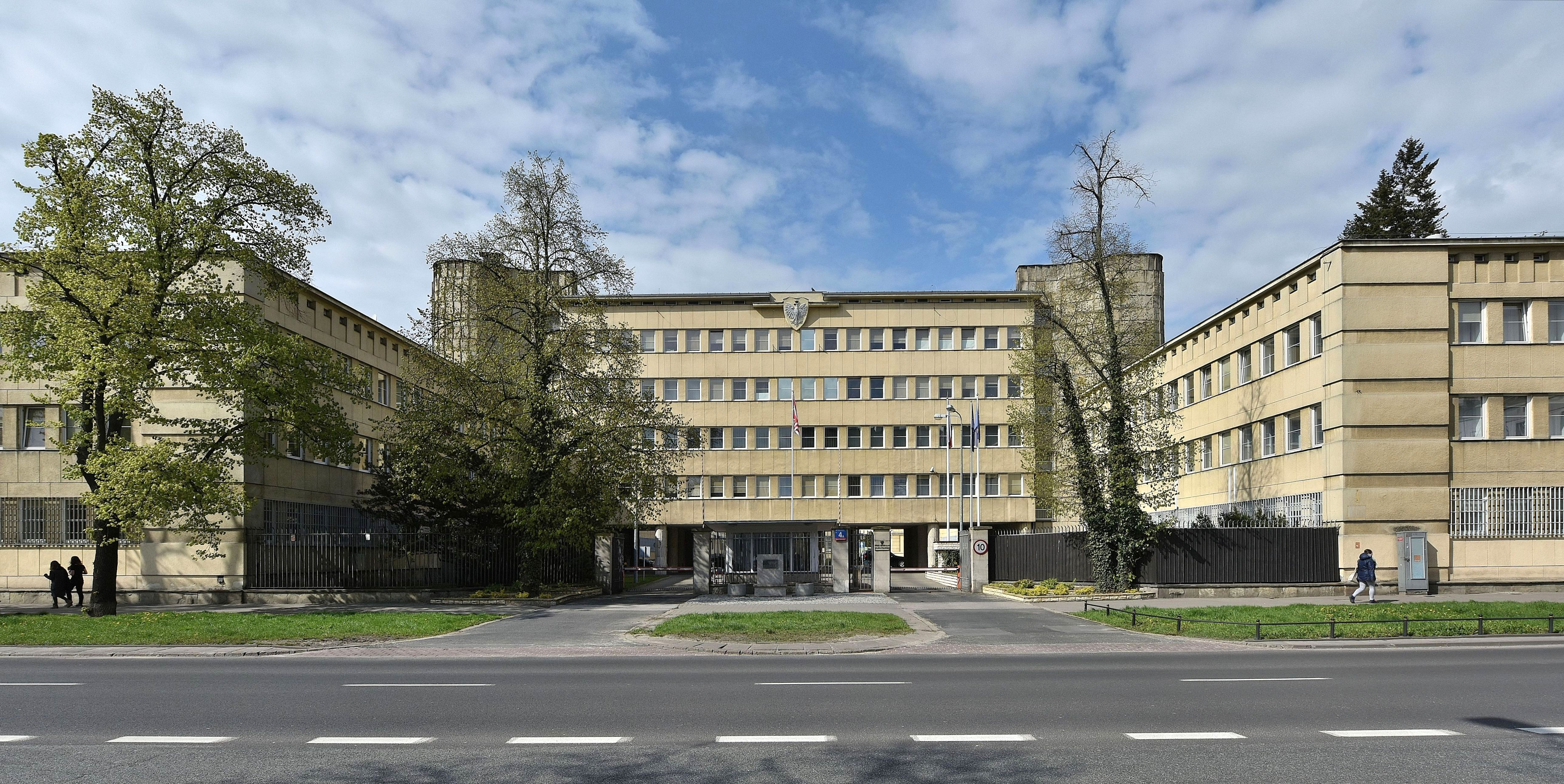
The headquarters of the General Staff of the Polish Armed Forces.

Upper Mokotów houses numerous government agencies, including:

- the Border Guard;
- Institute of National Remembrance;
- Internal Security Agency;
- the General Staff of the Polish Armed Forces;
- the Ministry of the Interior and Administration;
- the National Appeals Chamber;
- the National Council of the Judiciary;
- the National Fund for Environmental Protection and Water Management;
- the National Health Fund;
- the National Public Prosecutor's Office;
- the Police and the office of the Commander-in-Chief of Police;
- and the Polish Post. (Note: Attributed to multiple references:)

The area also includes the town hall of the Mokotów district, located at 25 and 27 Rakowiecka Street.

== Subdivisions ==
The subdivision of the Mokotów district into twelve City Information System areas. Its western portion constitutes Upper Mokotów.

Upper Mokotów forms the western side of the Mokotów district. It contains six out of its twelve City Information System areas, the subdivisions of the municipal standardised system of street signage in Warsaw. They are: Ksawerów, Old Mokotów, Służew, Służewiec, Wierzbno, and Wyględów. The district is also subdivided into five neighbourhoods governed by elected councils. Two of them, Wierzbno and Służewiec Południowy (lit. 'South Służewiec'), are located within Upper Mokotów.
