= Ksawerów =

Neighbourhood in Warsaw, Poland

- City Information System area (neighbourhood)
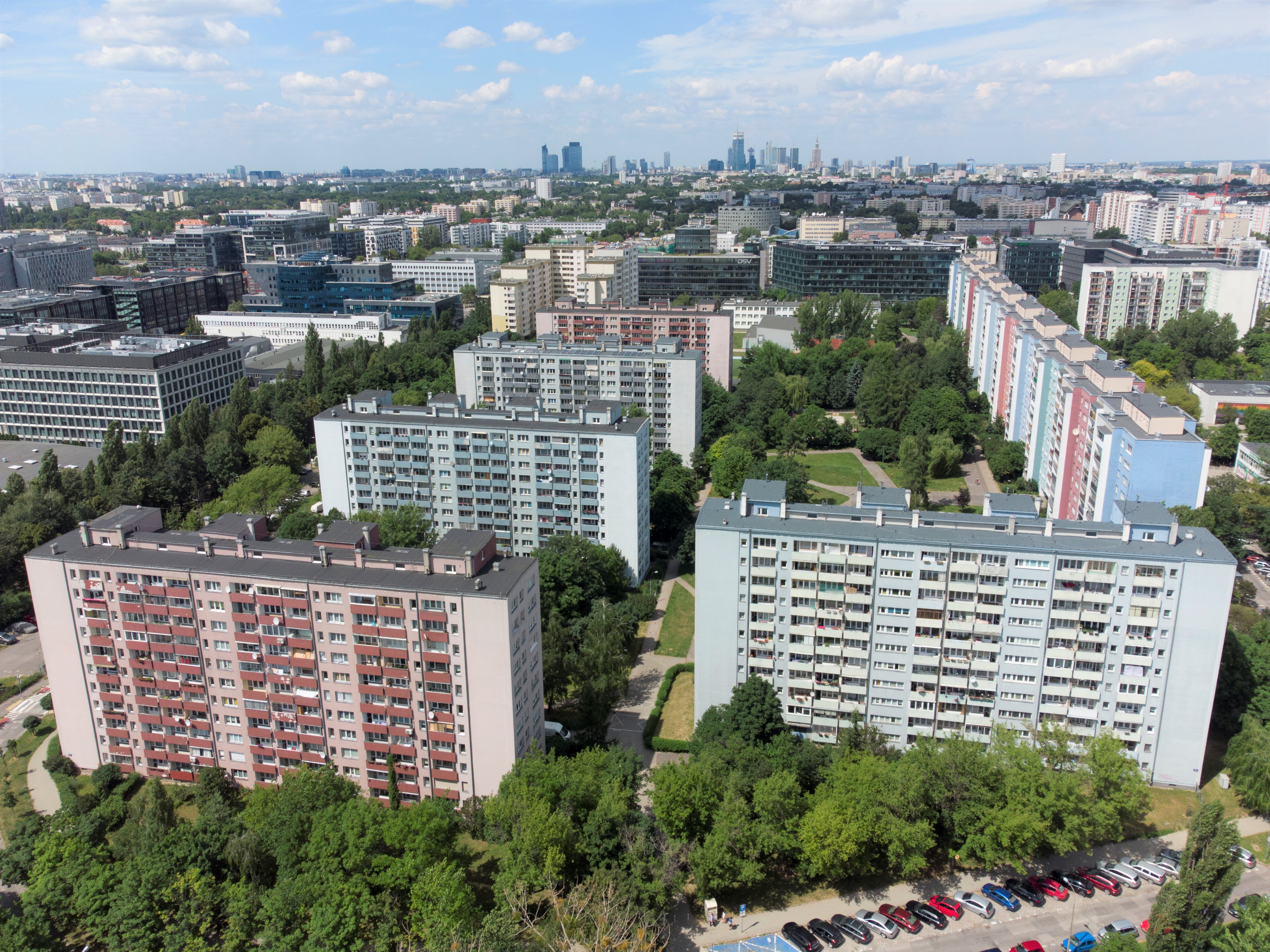
- The apartment buildings in the housing estate of Domaniewska within Ksawerów.

- The location of Ksawerów within the Mokotów district.
- Coordinates: 52°11′01″N 21°01′07″E
- Country: Poland
- Voivodeship: Masovian
- City county: Warsaw
- District: Mokotów
- Subdistrict: Upper Mokotów
- Time zone: UTC+1 (CET)
  - Summer (DST): UTC+2 (CEST)
- Area code: +48 22

Ksawerów (Polish: [ksaˈvɛr.uf]) is a neighbourhood, and an area of the City Information System, in the city of Warsaw, Poland, located within the district of Mokotów. The area is part of its western half, known as the Upper Mokotów. The neighbourhood is a residential area. This includes the housing estates of Domaniewska, Ksawerów, and Skarpa, consisting of the mid- and high-rise apartment buildings. It also includes the neighbourhood of Królikarnia in the northeast, featuring single-family housing. The area includes historic buildings such as the Rabbit House and Ksawerów Manor House, two neoclassical residences dating to 1786 and 1840, respectively. The first of the two, houses the Xawery Dunikowski Museum of Sculpture, a branch of the Warsaw National Museum. The western side of Ksawerów consists of office buildings, forming a part of the financial district, known colloquially as Mordor. It also includes the Westfield Mokotów, one of the largest shopping cenres in the city. Ksawerów also has the Wierzbno and Wilanowska stations of the M1 line of the Warsaw Metro underground rapid transit system.

The village of Szopy, a small farming community placed to the west from the Warsaw Escarpment, was first recorded in the documents in 1456. In the late 17th century, the Kingdom of Prussia begun settled German population in the village, which was then renamed to Szopy Niemieckie (lit. 'German Szopy'). In the 1770s, Józef Jakubowski, the brigadier in the French Army, founded the village of Wierzbno. In 1786, the Rabbit House, a neoclassical palace was built to its south, and in 1840, nobleman Ksawer Pusłowski built his residence in the area, now known as the Ksawerów Manor House. Over time, both areas developed into separate settlements, known as Królikarnia and Ksawerów. In 1916, they were incorporated into the city of Warsaw. In the 1960s and 1970s, the housing estates of Domaniewska, Ksawerów, and Skocznia were developed in the area. In the 1990s, series of office buildings developed in the western portion of the neighbourhood, foming a part of the financial district, known colloquially as Mordor. Until 2019, was the largest financial district in both the city and the country. In 1995, the M1 line of the Warsaw Metro was opened crossing the neighbourhood, with the Wierzbno and Wilanowska stations.

== Toponomy ==
Ksawerów was named after its founder, Ksawer Pusłowski, who, in 1840, built there his residence, now known as the Ksawerów Manor House. It was originally named Ksawery, and later became known as Ksawerów.

== History ==
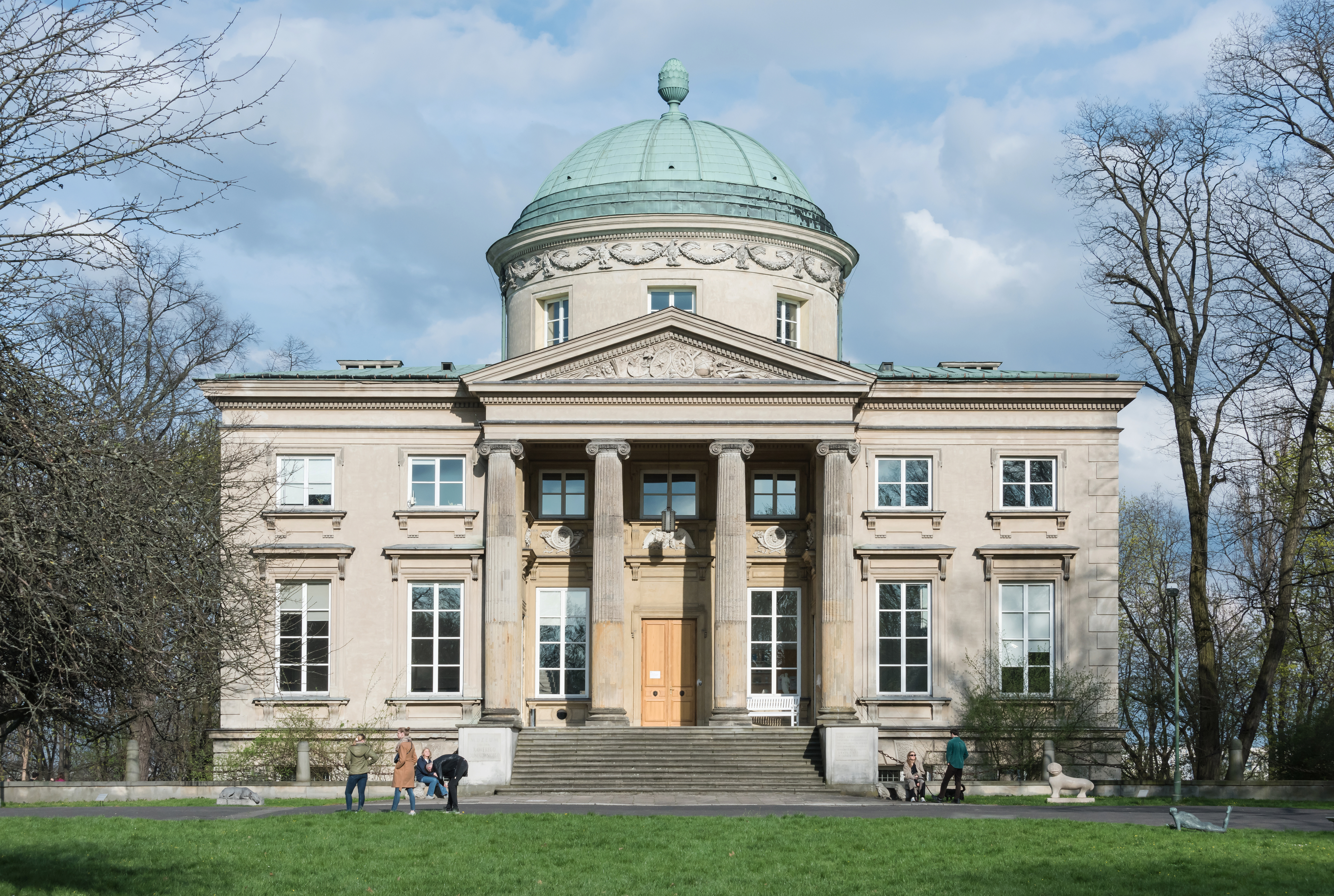
The Rabbit House, built in 1786.

By 1456, the village of Szopy was recorded in the area to the west of the Warsaw Escarpment near the road connecting Warsaw with Puławy, now forming Puławska Street. The settlement was owned by the Szopski family, which belonged to the petty nobility. Since the first half of the 17th century, the settlement was owned by the Roman Catholic order of Discalced Carmelites. In 1795, as the area became part of the Kingdom of Prussia, Szopy was nationalised, and in the late 18th century, the government begun placing German settlers in the village, which became known as Szopy Niemieckie (lit. 'German Szopy'). The Polish population settled an area to the east of Warsaw Escarpment, naming their settlement as Szopy Polskie (lit. 'Polish Shopy'). To the north of Szopy Polskie, was also founded Szopy Francuskie (lit. 'French Szopy'), settled by a French population.

In 1732, a pavilion, designed by Carl Friedrich Pöppelmann, was built on the Rabbit Hill, in place of a rabbit husbandry established earlier that century. The structure served as a residence and an observation deck for king Augustus II the Strong, the monarch of the Polish–Lithuanian Commonwealth, during the military exercises and exhibition, which were held from 31 July to 19 August 1732, on the nearby fields in Czerniaków. It was deconstructed around 1735. In 1748, the land was acquired by nobleman, writer, and military officer Alois Friedrich von Brühl, who redeveloped it into a Baroque garden, named the Arcadia (Polish: Arkadia).

In the 1770s, a plot of land was given by king Stanisław August Poniatowski to Józef Jakubowski, a brigadier in the French Army, who then established there a small agricultural estate, with a hamlet called Pod Wierzbą, later renamed to Wierzbno.

Between 1782 and 1786, the Rabbit House, a neoclassical palace residence, was built to the south of Wierzbno on the Rabbit Hill. It became residence of businessperson Carlo Alessandro Tomatis, and his wife, dancer Caterina Gattai Tomatis, who was a royal mistress of king Stanisław August Poniatowski. The building was designed by Domenico Merlini. In 1794, during the Kościuszko Uprising, it served as the residence of Tadeusz Kościuszko, the leader of the insurgent forces. In 1816, the building was sold to statesman Michał Hieronim Radziwiłł. At the end of the first half of the 19th century, the gardens surrounding the Rabbit House were redeveloped as an English landscape garden.

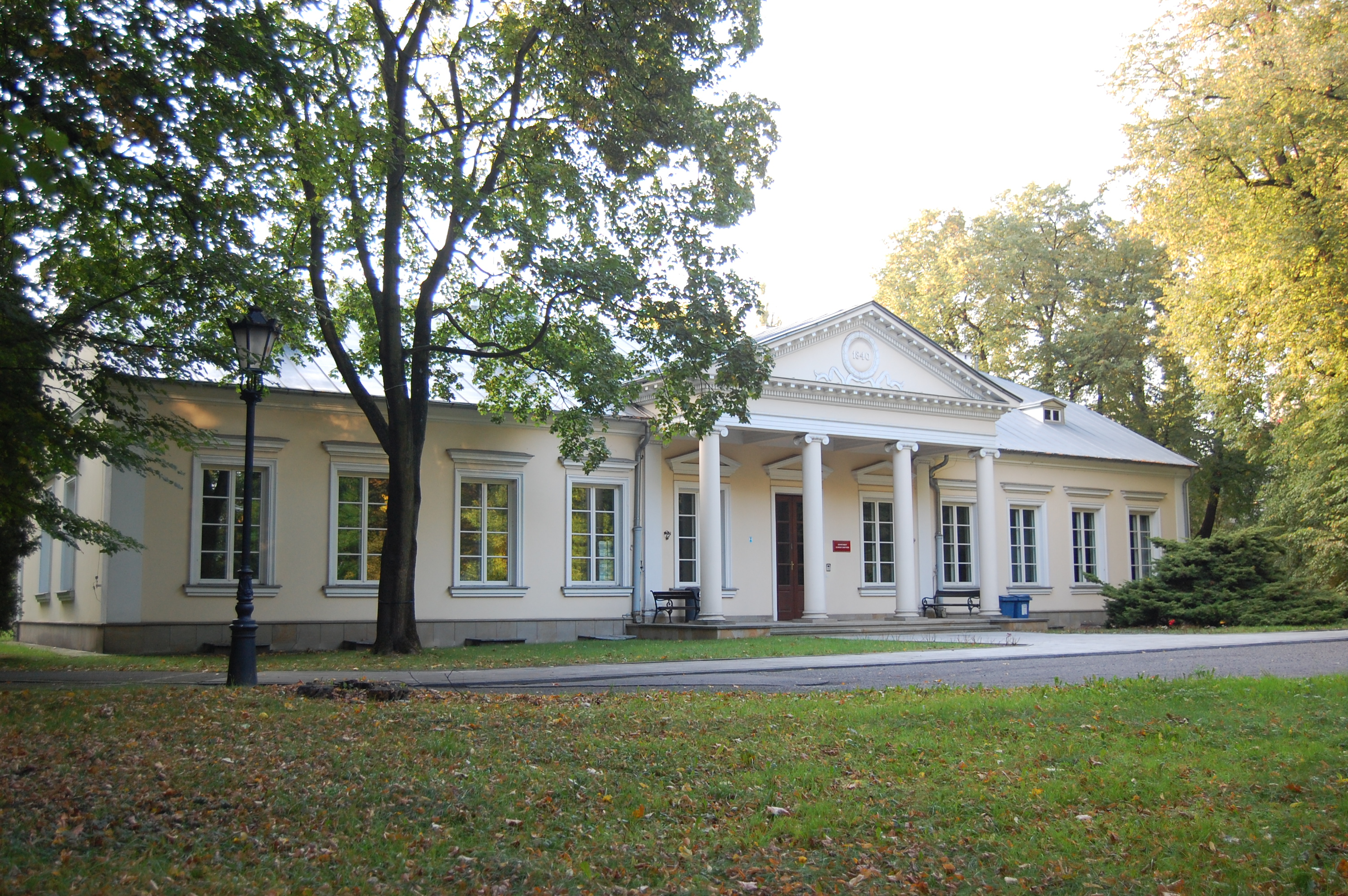
The Ksawerów Manor House, built in 1840.

In 1840, nobleman Ksawer Pusłowski built his residence to the south of Wierzbno, now known as Ksawerów Manor House. In 1849, he also bought the Rabbit House. Over time, the area developed into two separate settlements, known as Królikarnia and Ksawery, the later being named after the founder, and later becoming known as Ksawerów.

Between 1852 and 1853, the Yellow Tavern, designed by Francesco Maria Lanci, was built at the current 204 Wilanowska Avenue. It was originally associated as part of the nearby village of Służew. Until the beginning of the 20th century, it had operated as a tavern known as Belle-Vue. After that, it went bankrupt, and the building was used for various purposes, including as a dog husbandry building, and a residential building. In 1966, it was nationalised, in an effort to protect it as cultural property. In 1984, the Museum of the Polish Peasant Movement was opened in the building.

On 13 January 1867, villages of Królikarnia and Ksawerów became part of the rural municipality of Mokotów, established as part of the administrative reform in the Kingdom of Poland. The municipality was incorporated into the city of Warsaw on 8 April 1916.

In 1881, a tramline connecting Wierzbno, Ksawerów, and Królikarnia with Moktów and Warsaw, was opened with tracks built alongside Puławska Street. It was first operated by a horsecar, and since 1909, by an electric tram. Since 1892, the narrow-gauge tracks were also operated by the Wilanów Railway, and since 1898, also by the Grójec Commuter Railway. In 1906, the Wierzbno station, operated by the Grójec Narrow-Gauge Railway, was opened near the current intersection of Puławska and Woronicza Streets, and near the Rabbit House palace. It operated until 1937. In 1935, the Warsaw Mokotów station, which was previously placed at the Union of Lublin Square, was moved to the intersection of Puławska and Odyńca Streets in Wierzbno, where it operated until 1938.

In 1937, the Warszawa Szopy narrow-gauge railway station was opened at the intersection of Puławska Street and Wilanowa Avenue. It was operated by the Grójec Commuter Railway, forming a part of the line between Warszawa Mokotów and Nowe Miasto nad Pilicą. In 1943, it was renamed to Warszawa Pułudniowa (lit. 'Warsaw South'). The station operated until 1969. In the 1970s, a bus station with a turning loop was opened at the location, under the name of the South Station. It originally used the historic building of the railway station, which was eventually deconstructed in 2000. Since then, it function under the name of Wilanowska turning loop.

In September 1939, during the siege of Warsaw in the Second World War, the Rabbit House was used by the Polish Armed Forces as the defensive position against the attacking forces of the German Army. The building was destroyed during the fighting. In 1944, during the Warsaw Uprising, the divisions of the Home Army were stationed in the palace gardens. On 25 September 1944, it was the site of the heavy fighting between Polish and German soldiers. In the October 1944, the palace, together with the surrounding buildings, was burned down by German occupant forces, as part of the destruction of Warsaw.

In 1945 the Rabbit House became the property of the city of Warsaw, being confiscated from the Krasiński family via the Bierut Decree. The building was rebuilt in 1964, and a year later, the Xawery Dunikowski Museum of Sculpture was opened inside of it, as a branch of the Warsaw National Museum.

In 1955, the housing estate of Ksawerów was developed alongside Puławska Street, consisting of tenement houses. It was designed by Wacław Kłyszewski, Jerzy Mokrzyński, and Eugeniusz Wierzbicki.

Around 1955, a national headquarters building of the Citizens' Militia, the national police organisation, was built at 148 and 150 Puławska Street. In 1990, the building became headquarters of the Police, which replaced the Citizens' Militia.

In 1959, the Warsaw Ski Jumping Hill, a small hill ski jumping venue, with the construction point at 38 m (124.67 ft), was opened at 3 Czerniowiecka Street on the Warsaw Escarpment. It was operated by the Warsaw Ski Club, and was mostly used as a training venue and occasionally hosted ski jumping competitions. It was modernised between 1975 and 1980. The last competition was hosted there in 1989, and it continued to serve as a training venue until the early 1990s, after which it stopped being used. It was deconstructed between 2010 and 2011.

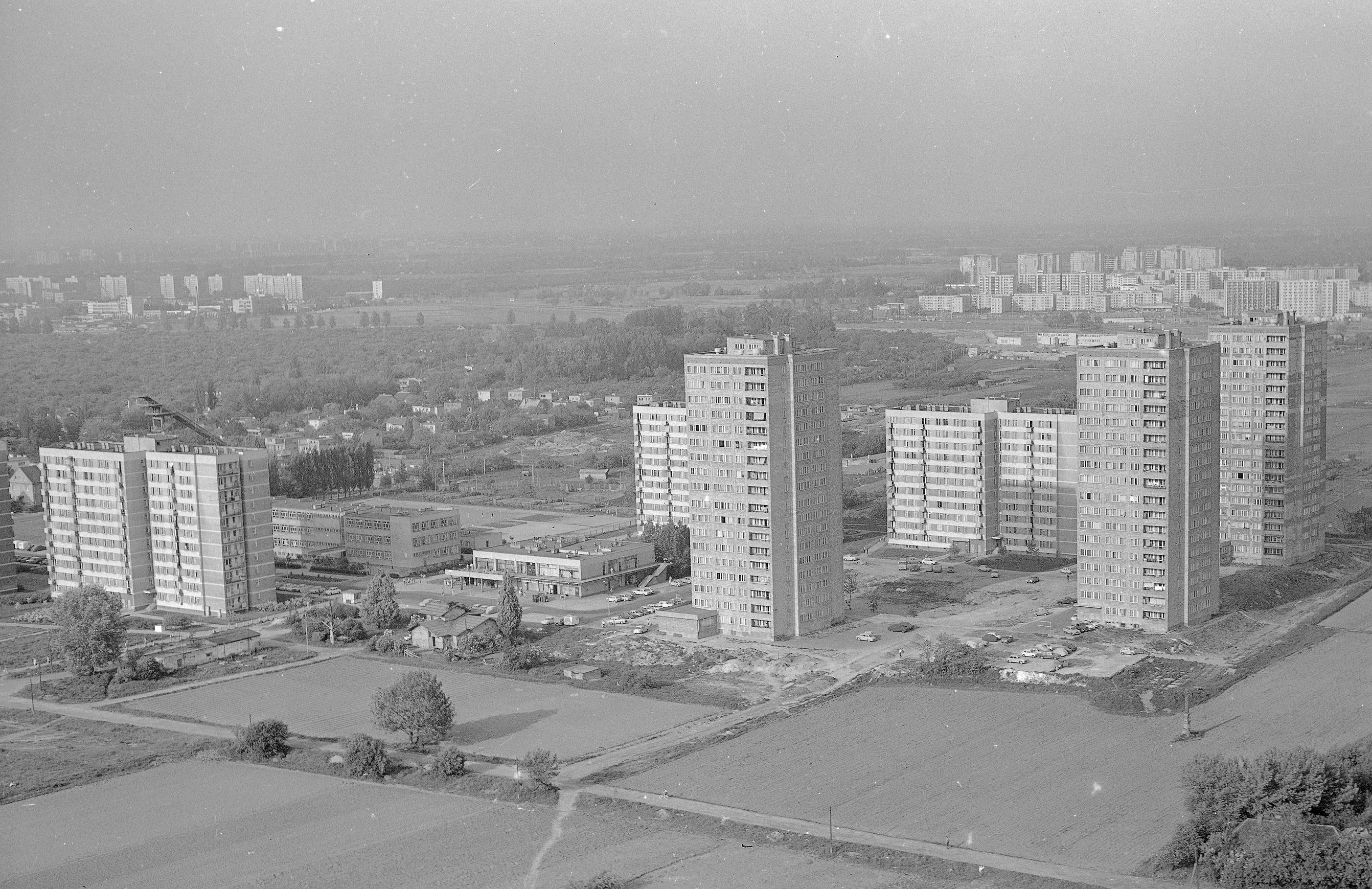
The housing estate of Skocznia, and the remaining buildings of Szopy Niemieckie, in 1974.

Between 1961 and 1977, two housing estates were developed in the neighbourhood, consisting of the mid- and high-rise apartment buildings, constructed using the large panel system technology. They were Ksawerów, built between Ksawerów Street, Modzelewskiego Street, Independence Avenue, and Okęcka Street, for around 4,000 residents, Skocznia, built between Bukowińska Street, Cieszyńska Street, Czerniowiecka Street, and the Warsaw Escarpment, for around 3,000 residents, and Domaniewska, built between Domaniewska Street, Independence Avenue, Wilanowska Avenue, and Langego Street, and around 5,200 residents. The housing estate of Skocznia was built in place of the historical buildings of Szopy Niemieckie.

Between 1968 and 1970, the Arcadia Park was developed on the garden area surrounding the Rabbit House, between Puławska Street, Żywnego Street, Piaseczyńska Street, and Idzikowskiego Street. It was designed by Longin Majdecki.

In 1969, the Radio and Television Centre was opened at 17 Woronicza Street, as the headquarters of Polish Television, a state media public broadcasting television network. The current headquarters building in the complex was built in 2007.

Between 1982 and 1996, the Holy Virgin Mary the Mother of Church was built at 20 Domaniewska Street, as a seat of a Roman Catholic parish. Since 2015, it also hosts the Blessed Bishop Nicholas Charnetsky Parish of the Greek Catholic Church in Poland.

In the 1990s, a financial district begun emerging in Służewiec and western Ksawerów, with the development of large office complexes, eventually becoming the largest in Poland. In 1992, Curtis Plaza, located at 18 Wołoska Street, became one of the first office buildings constructed in the area. It was considered a prime example of postmodern architecture in the city, and was eventually demolished in 2024. By 2019, the area included 83 office buildings, which were mostly constructed without city oversight and contributed to the development of an office monoculture. In 2015, the area had been estimated to have between 80 and 100 thousand people commuting to work there. The large number of daily commuters, together with local road systems not designed for such volume of traffic, caused regular traffic congestion and lack of availability of parking space in the area, leading to the financial district being colloquially known as Mordor. The name referenced Mordor, a fictional location, and personification of evil, from the 1954 fantasy novel The Lord of the Rings written by J. R. R. Tolkien.

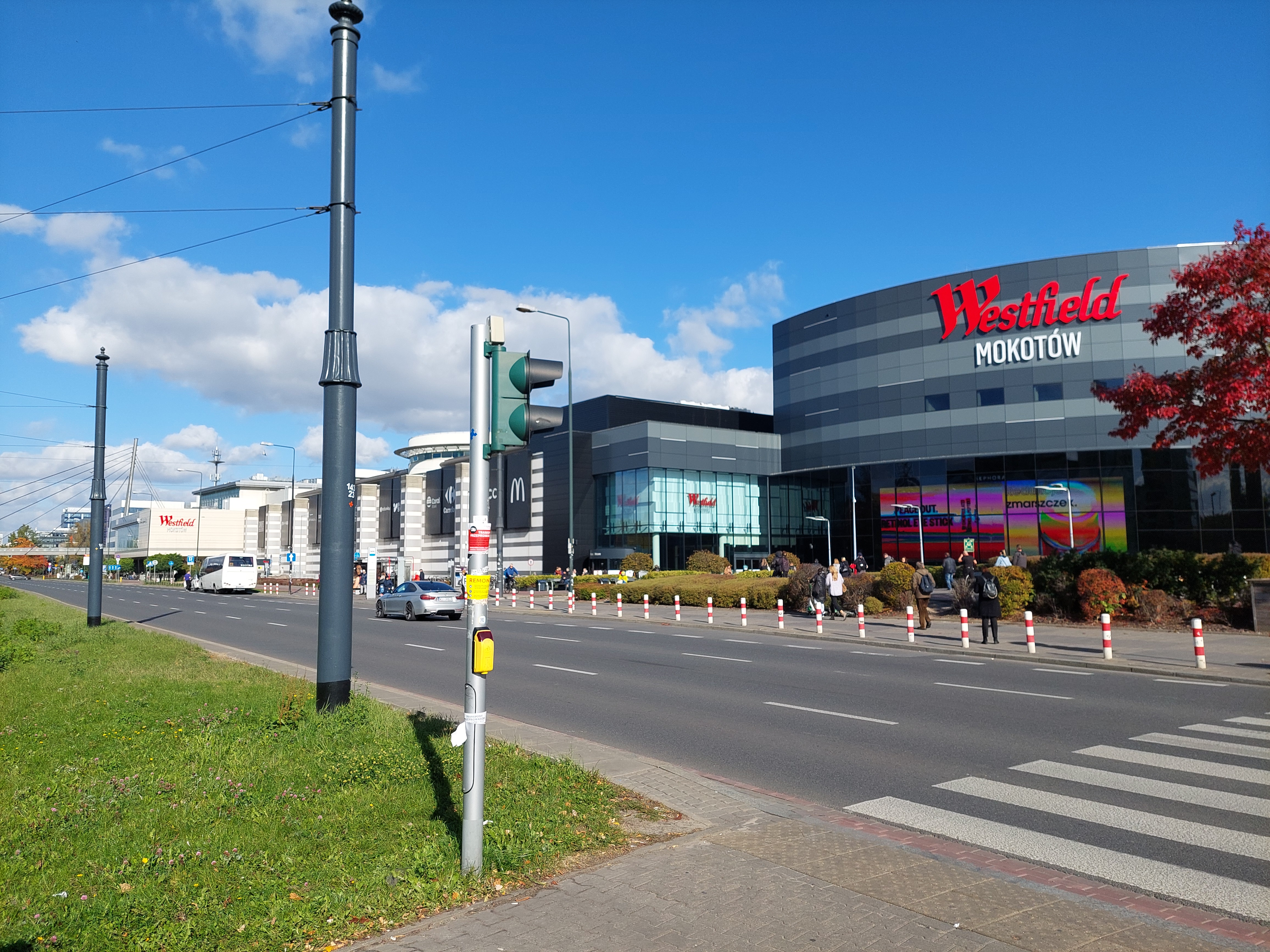
Westfield Mokotów, one of the largest shopping centres in the city, opened in 2000.

The high-rise residential buildings begun being constructed in the former industrial area of Służewiec in the 1990s, alongside office buildings, and to their south. While, the region was dominated by office spaces, and considered the largest financial district in Poland, it began losing its status to the Wola district in 2019, with the last office building being built there in 2020. Since then, the number of rented office spaces has begun to steadily decrease, as the neighbourhood transformed into a housing area, with the development of new housing estates throughout the early 2020s.

On 7 April 1995, two stations of the M1 line of the Warsaw Metro underground rapid transit system, were opened in Old Mokotów. They were the Wilanowska station, located at the intersection of Puławska Street and Wilanowska Avenue, and the Wierzbno station, located at the intersection of Woronicza Street, Independence Avenue, and Naruszewicza Street. The Wilanowska station hosted the ceremony of opening the M1 metro line. It was opened by Józef Oleksy, the Prime Minister of Poland, Marcin Święcicki, the mayor of Warsaw, and Jan Podoski, an engineer who proposed and initiated the construction of the metro line.

On 4 October 1996, the Mokotów district was subdivided into twelve City Information System areas, with Ksawerów becoming one of them.

In 2000, Westfield Mokotów (originally known as Galeria Mokotów), one of the largest shopping centres in the city, was opened at 12 Wołoska Street.

== Housing ==
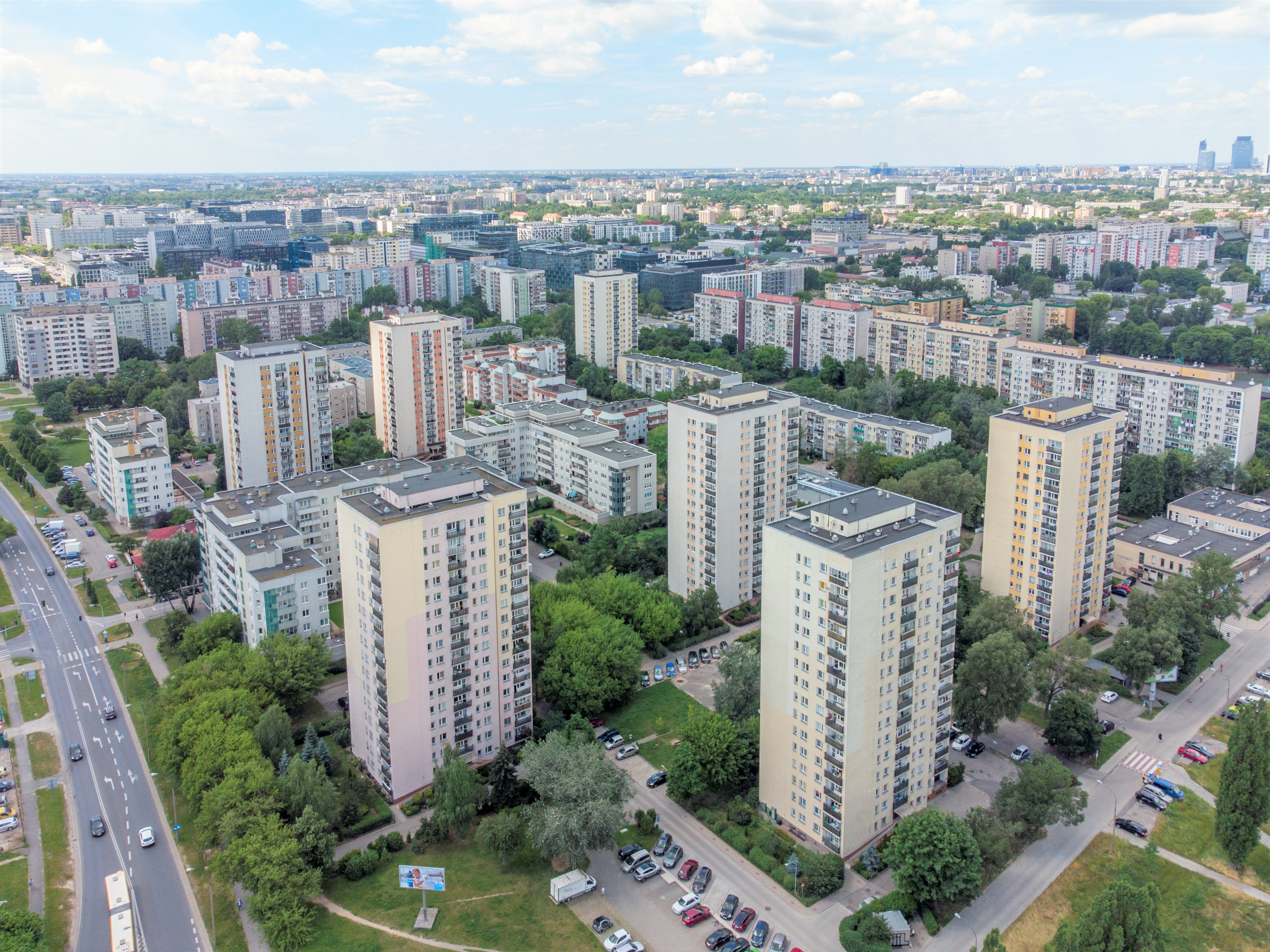
The housing estate of Domaniewska.

Ksawerów is a residential area predominately consisting of mid-rise apartment buildings. It includes housing estates consisting of apartment buildings constructed throughout the 1960s and 1970s, using the large panel system technology. This includes Domaniewska between Domaniewska Street, Independence Avenue, Wilanowska Avenue, and Langego Street, Ksawerów between Ksawerów Street, Modzelewskiego Street, Independence Avenue, and Okęcka Street, and Skocznia between Bukowińska Street, Cieszyńska Street, Czerniowiecka Street, and the Warsaw Escarpment. The area also features the housing estate of Ksawerów consisting of tenement houses built in 1955 alongside Puławska Street. In the east, the area also includes the neighbourhood of Królikarnia, consisting of single-family houses, placed between Puławska Street, Czerniakowska Street, Zawrat Street, and the Warsaw Escarpment.

== Economy ==
The western portion of Ksawerów predominantly consists of office building complexes. Together with the nearby neighbourhood of Służewiec, it forms a financial district, which including headquarters of numerous domestic companies, and branches of many multinational corporations. It is colloquially referred to as Mordor, and Mordor at Domaniewska, reference to Mordor, a fictional location, and personification of evil, from the 1954 fantasy novel The Lord of the Rings written by J. R. R. Tolkien. It was originally coined as a critique of the terrible road traffic conditions in the area in the 2010s. While the number of rented office spaces in the area had been in decline since 2020, it used to be the largest financial district in Poland from its emergence in the 1990s to 2019, at its peak, including 83 office buildings. The neighbourhood also features Westfield Mokotów, one of the largest shopping centres in the city, located at 12 Wołoska Street.

== Culture and parks ==
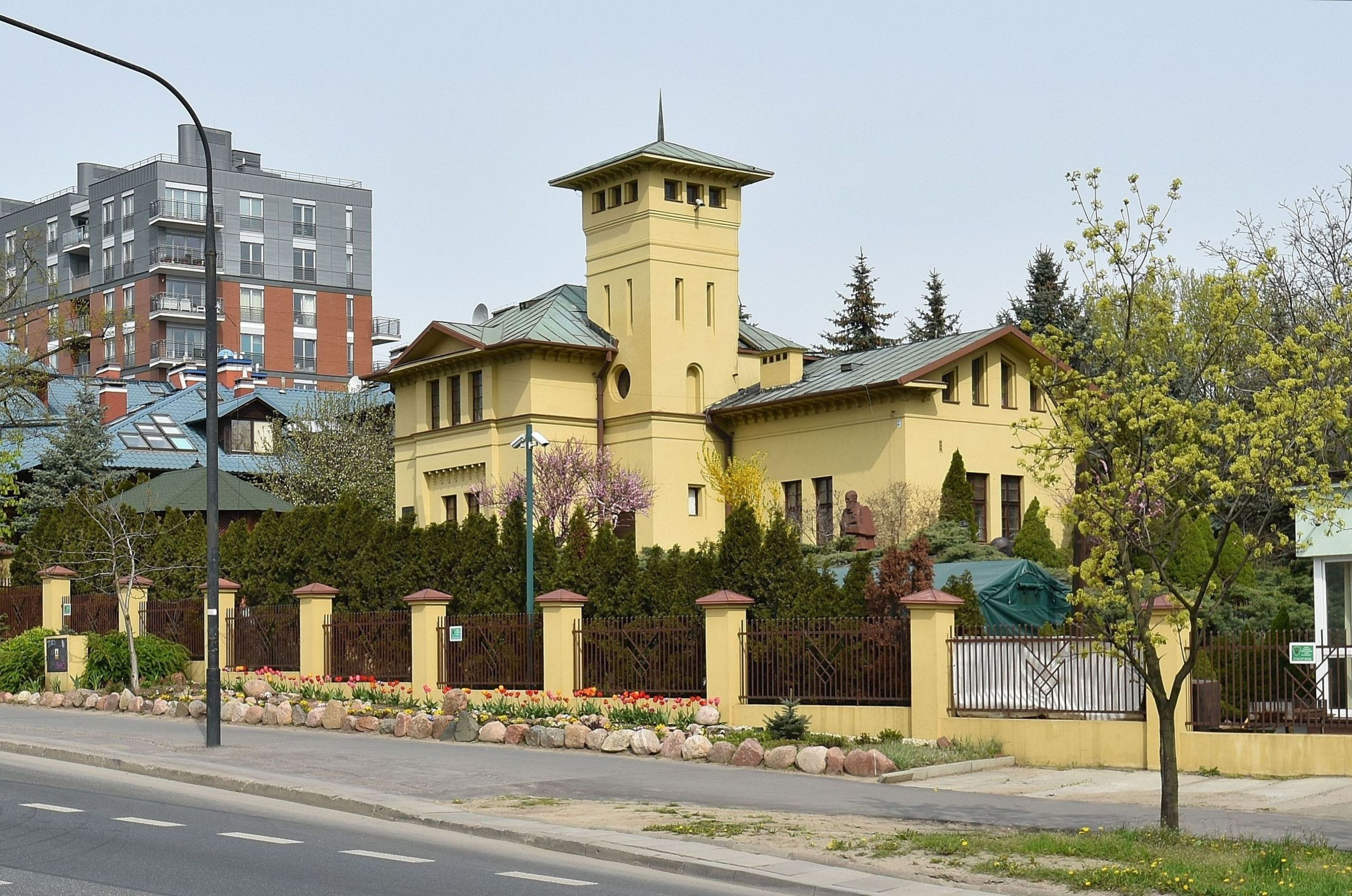
The Yellow Tavern, a historic building from 1853, which houses the Museum of the Polish Peasant Movement.

Ksawerów features the Rabbit House, a historic neoclassical palace residence dating to 1786, placed at 113A Puławska Street. It houses the Xawery Dunikowski Museum of Sculpture, a branch of the Warsaw National Museum. Surrounding it garden forms the Sculpture Park (Polish: Park Rzeźby), which features the museal exponents. It is bordered, to the north and east, by the Arcadia Park, with its small portion located within the boundaries of Ksawerów. The neighbourhood also includes the Granat Group of the Home Army Square (Polish: Skwer Grupy AK „Granat”), a garden square bordered by Woronicza Street, Puławska Street, Broniwoja Street, and Wielicka Street. It is named after the 10th Artillery Cadre Regiment, also known as the "Granat" Artillery Group, which was a military unit of the Home Army during the Second World War. The square features a monument dedicated to the fallen soldiers of the unit.

Ksawerów also includes the Yellow Tavern, a historic building from 1853, located at 204 Wilanowska Avenue, which houses the Museum of the Polish Peasant Movement. Additionally, the Ksawerów Manor House, a historic neoclassical residence dating to 1840, is placed at 13 Ksawerów Street. The Holy Virgin Mary the Mother of Church, which forms the seat of a Roman Catholic parish, is placed at 20 Domaniewska Street. The building also hosts the Blessed Bishop Nicholas Charnetsky Parish of the Greek Catholic Church in Poland. The neighbourhood also includes the headquarters of the Polish Television, a state media public broadcasting television network, located at 17 Woronicza Street in Ksawerów.

== Transport ==
Wierzbno includes two stations of the M1 line of the Warsaw Metro underground rapid transit system. They are the Wilanowska station, located at the intersection of Puławska Street and Wilanowska Avenue, and the Wierzbno station, located at the intersection of Woronicza Street, Independence Avenue, and Naruszewicza Street.

== Government ==
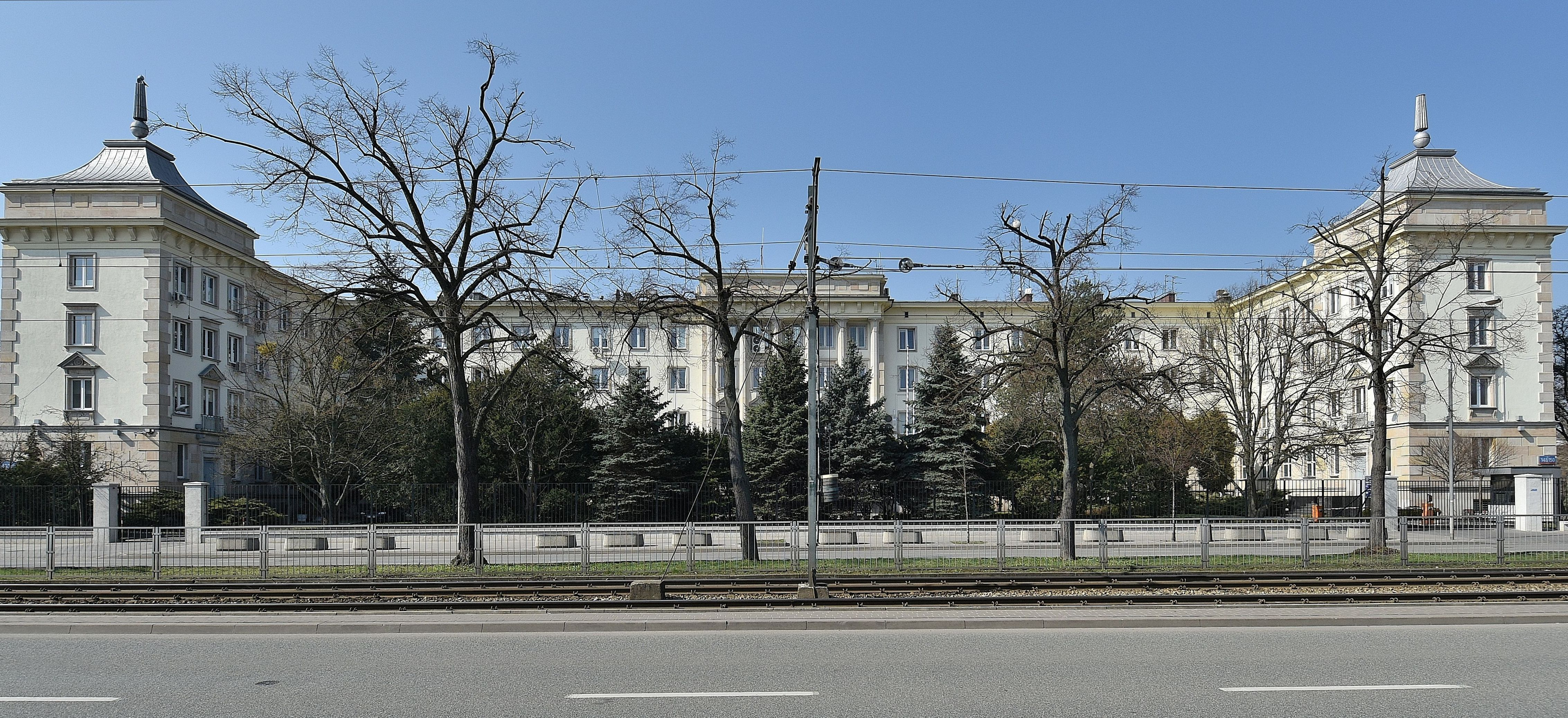
The national headquarters of the Police of Poland.

Ksawerów features the national headquarters of the Police at 148 and 150 Puławska Street, which houses the office of the Commander-in-Chief of Police. The neighbourhood also includes the headquarters of the Department of Heritage Protection of the Ministry of Culture and National Heritage, housed in the Ksawerów Manor House at 13 Ksawerów Street, and the headquarters of the Polish Post, the state postal administration, located at 8 Rodziny Hiszpańskich Street.

== Location and boundaries ==
Ksawerów is located in the city of Warsaw, Poland, within the central western portion of the Mokotów district, within the subregion of Upper Mokotów. Its boundaries are approximately determined to the north by Woronicza Street; to the east by the Warsaw Escarpment; to the south by Wilanowska Avenue; and to the west by Wołoska Street. The neighbourhood borders Wyględów to the northwest, Wierzbno to the north, Sielce and Stegny to the east, Służew to the south, and Służewiec to the west.
