= Yellow Tavern =

Yellow Tavern may refer to:

- Battle of Yellow Tavern, 1864 confrontation in the American Civil War
- Bound Brook station, formerly the Yellow Tavern station
- Museum of the Polish Peasant Movement, located in the Yellow Tavern building
