= Mordor, Warsaw =

Financial district in Warsaw, Poland

Mordor
- Neighbourhood
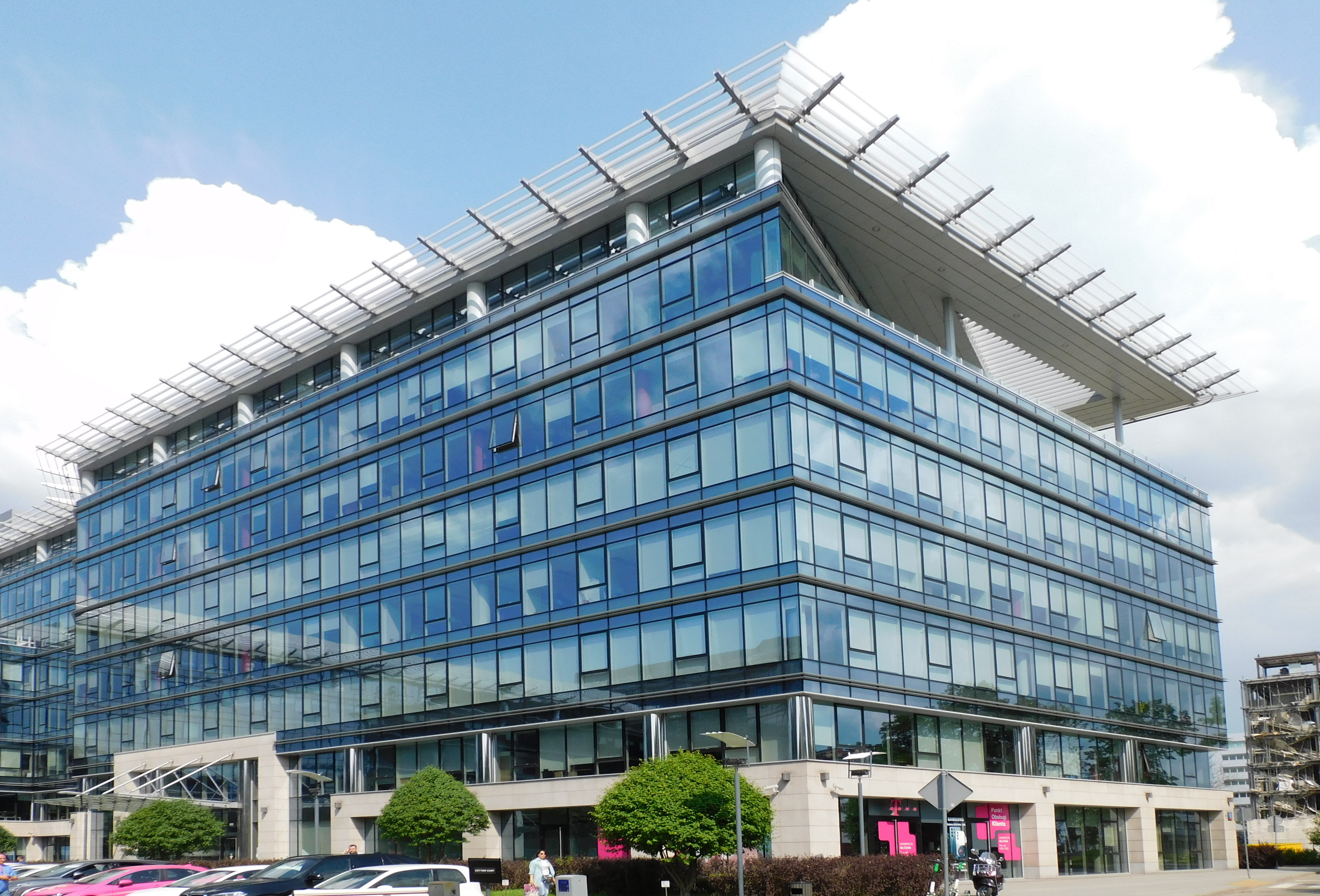
- An office building on Marynarska Street.
- Interactive map of Mordor
- Coordinates: 52°10′56″N 21°00′11″E
- Country: Poland
- Voivodeship: Masovian
- City and county: Warsaw
- District: Mokotów
- Subdistrict: Upper Mokotów
- City Information System areas: Ksawerów; Służewiec
- Time zone: UTC+1 (CET)
  - Summer (DST): UTC+2 (CEST)
- Area code: +48 22

Mordor, also known as Mordor on Domaniewska Street (Polish: Mordor na Domaniewskiej), is a colloquial name for a financial district in the Mokotów district of Warsaw, Poland, within north Służewiec and west Ksawerów. The area is mostly composed of office buildings, including the headquarters of numerous domestic companies, and branches of many multinational corporations. Emerging in the 1990s, the area used to be the largest financial district in Poland, until 2019, when it lost the title to the nearby Wola district. Currently, the volume of rented office space in the neighbourhood is in decline, as it transforms into a residential district. The name, coined in the 2010s, refers to Mordor, a fictional location in the 1954 fantasy novel The Lord of the Rings written by J. R. R. Tolkien.

== Toponymy ==
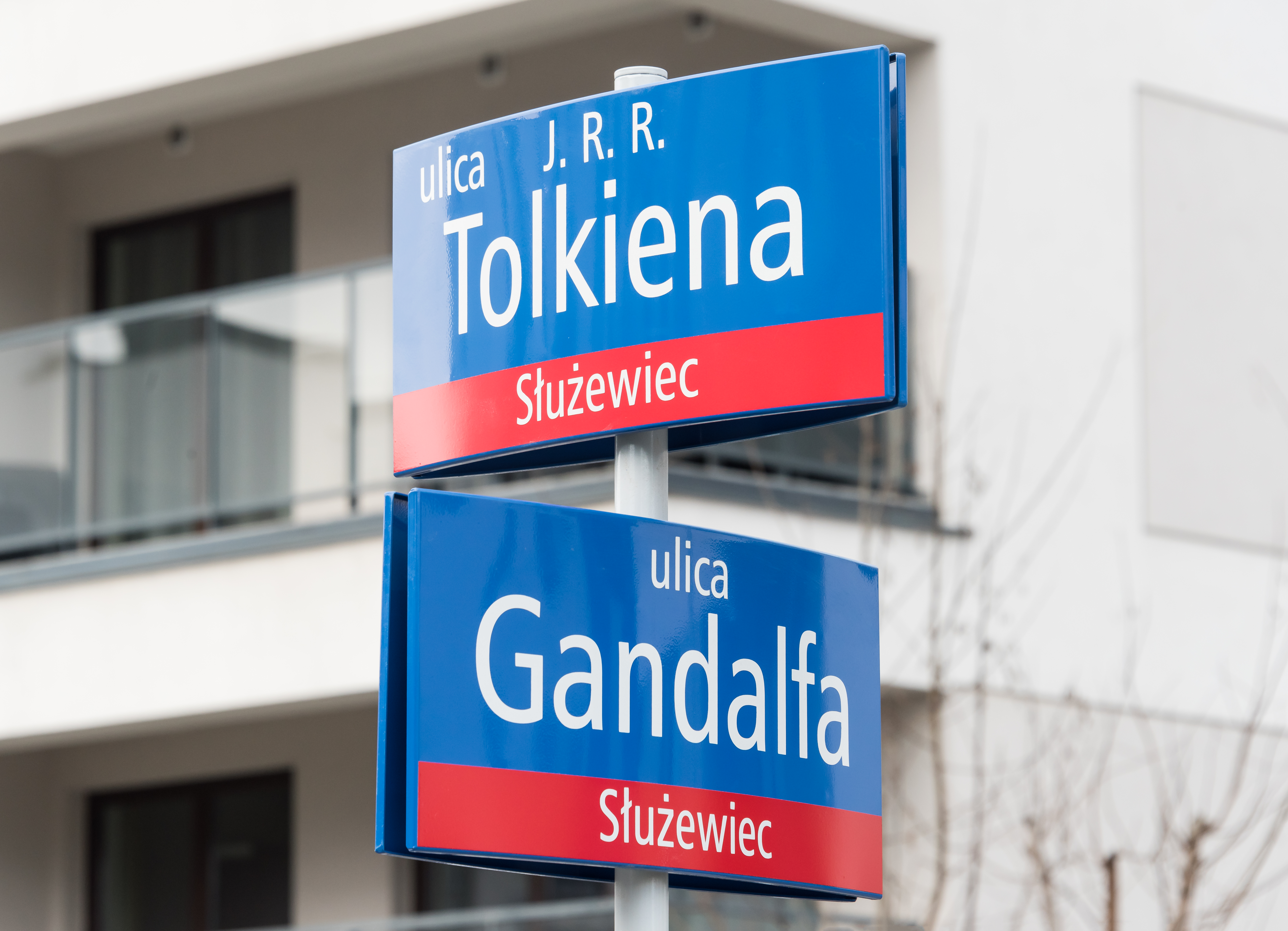
The street signs at the intersection of Tolkien and Gandalf Streets.

The colloquial names Mordor, and Mordor on Domaniewska Street (Polish: Mordor na Domaniewskiej) were coined in the 2010s, as a critique of the regular traffic congestion and lack of availability of parking space in the financial district in the north Służewiec and west Ksawerów. The name referenced Mordor, a fictional location, and personification of evil, from the 1954 fantasy novel The Lord of the Rings written by J. R. R. Tolkien. The name was popularized by a Facebook page titled Mordor na Domaniewskiej in 2013, which surpassed 100,000 followers in 2018. A magazine, titled Głos Mordoru (The Voice of Mordor) is also distributed in the area, targeting the local office employees.

Accordingly, the corporate employees in the area are informally referred to as orcs, members of the fictional race of humanoid monsters in the Tolkien's book, which inhabit Mordor. The name was coined as a commentary on the rat race culture, which many of the employees partake in.

There is a movement to make Mordor the officially recognized name of the area. In 2015, its supporters hung a street sign with name, which was taken down by the authorities soon after. In 2018, the local inhabitants had proposed via the participatory budgeting, the recognition of the name, which however was not approved. Since 2015, the name is accepted by Google Maps search engine. On 12 December 2020, two small streets in the neighborhood of Służewiec were named after Tolkien and Gandalf, one of the main characters from the book.

== History ==
=== Industrial district ===
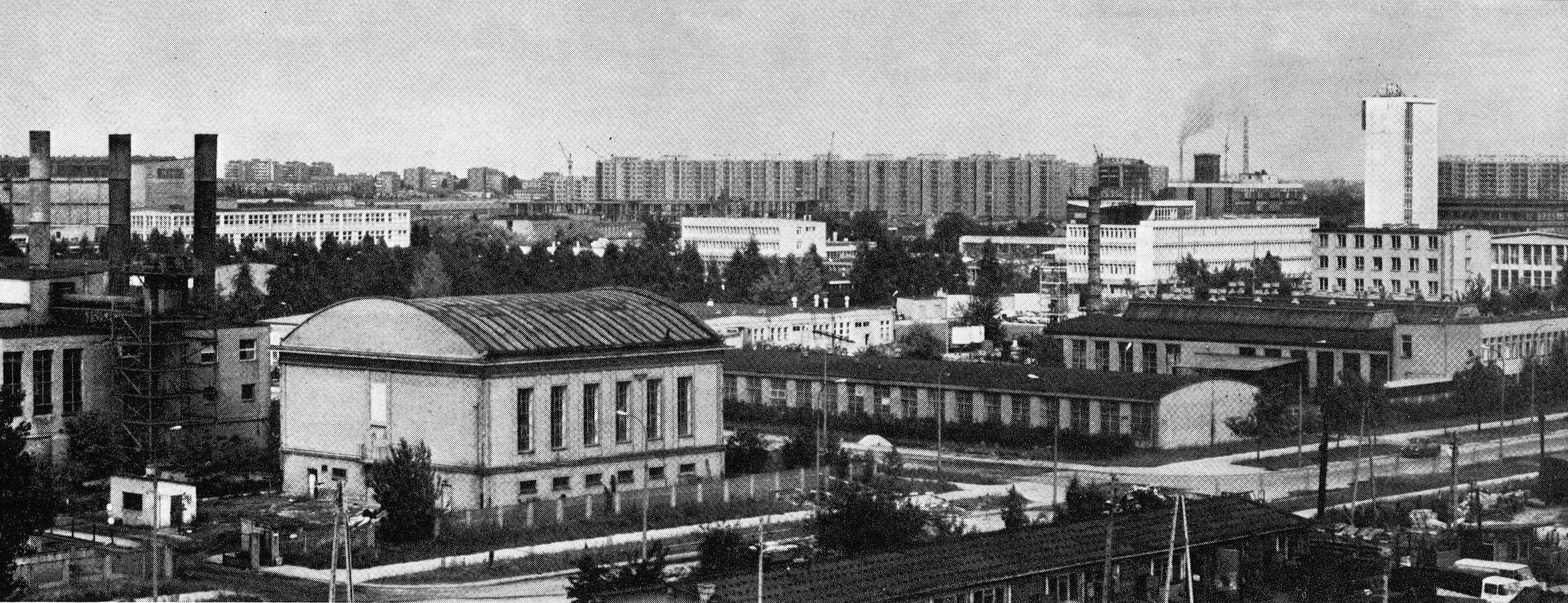
The general view of the industrial area of Służewiec in the 1970s.

The area, then a part of the village of Służewiec was incorporated into the city of Warsaw on 27 September 1938. The neighbourhood was completely demolished in 1944 by the German officers, during the Second World War, as part of the destruction of Warsaw.

In 1951, it was decided to develop a manufacturing industry in the area, as part of the Industrial and Storage District of Służewiec, later simply known as Służewiec Przemysłowy (Industrial Służewiec). It was envisioned to feature 60 factories and industrial plants. They were constructed using the large panel system technique, making it as one of the first instances of its usage in Poland. The designated area covered around 2.6 km^{2} (1 sq mi), and its construction began in 1952. In the early 1970s, around 20,000 people were employed there.

In 1951, the Institute of Organisation and Mechanization of Construction was founded. It was renamed in 1973 to the Institute of Construction Mechanisation, and again in 1986, to the Institute of Mechanised Construction and Rock Mining, becoming a research facility for the mechanisation of construction, and development of machinery for construction, road, building materials industry and rock mining. It had its headquarters at 6 and 8 Racjonalizacji Street, and operated until 2023, when it merged with the Institute of Precision Mechanics, forming the Warsaw Institute of Technology, with the headquarters in the Żoliborz district.

In 1953, the Mokotów trams depot was opened at 27 Woronicza Street In 1959, the Woronicza bus depot was also opened on the other side of the road, at 29 Woronicza Street. In 1961, the neighbourhood was connected to the tram network, with tracks built alongside Wołoska and Marynarska Streets, and ending with a turning loop near Suwak Street. In 1962, the Warszawa Służewiec railway station, was opened at Logarytmiczna Street.

In 1961, the headquarters of the Łukasiewicz Institute of Ceramics and Building Materials of the Łukasiewicz Research Network, then known as the Institute of Glass and Ceramics Industry, were moved to 9 Postępu Street in Służewiec. Currently, it is a national research institute of processing of nonmetal resources, including the manufacture of ceramics and building materials, mineral binding agents, and concrete.

In 1969, the Radio and Television Centre, a complex of buildings which, to the present day, serves as the headquarters of Polish Television, a state media public broadcasting television network of Poland, was built at 17 Woronicza Street. The main office building, currently used as the company headquarters, was constructed in 2008.

=== Financial district ===
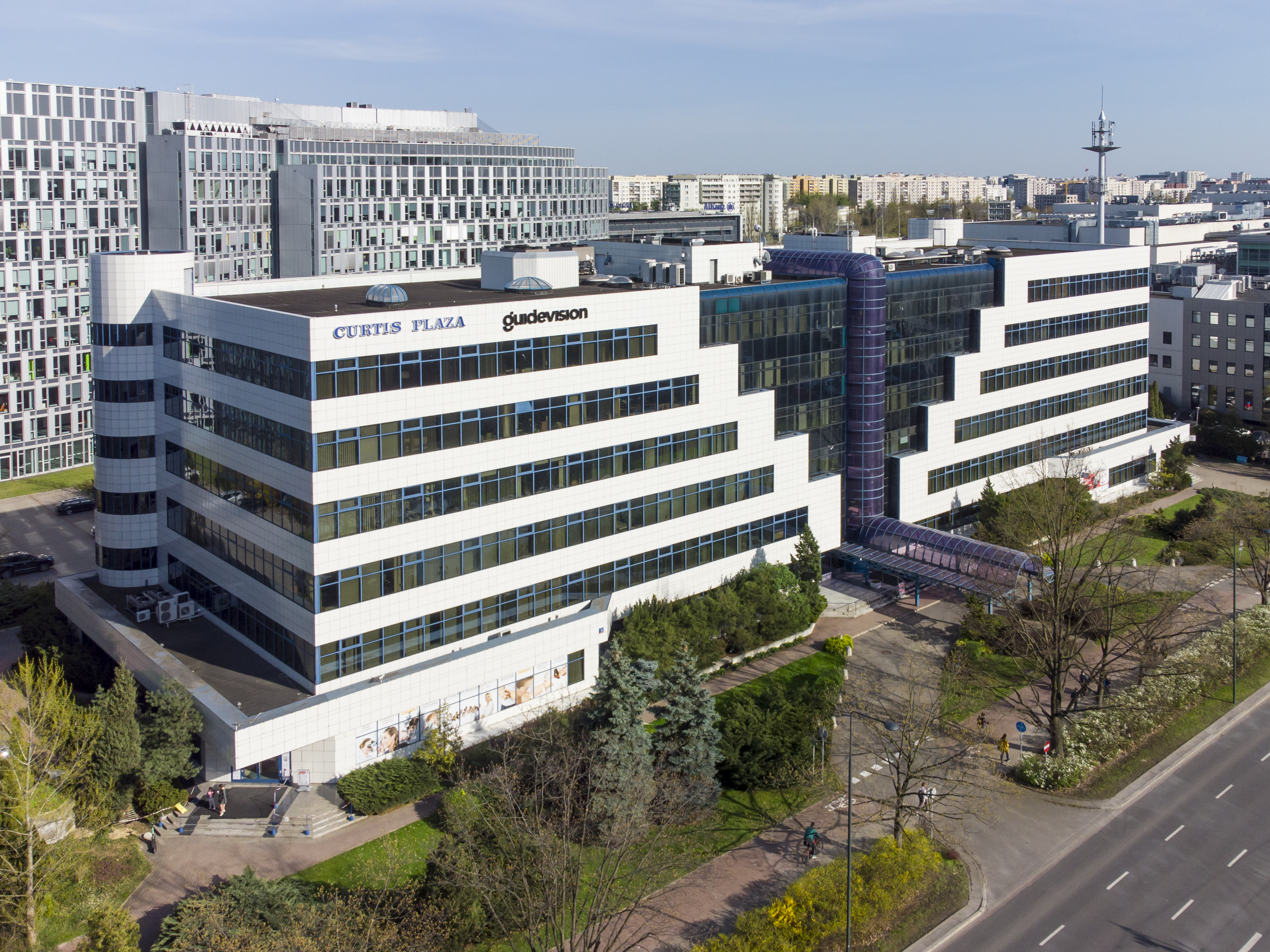
Curtis Plaza, one of the first office buildings in the area, constructed in 1992, and demolished in 2024.

In the 1990s, the manufacturing industry left the area, leading to the emergence of a financial district, with the development of large office complexes, eventually becoming the largest in Poland. In 1992, Curtis Plaza, located at 18 Wołoska Street, became one of the first office buildings constructed in the area. It was considered a prime example of postmodern architecture in the city, and was eventually demolished in 2024. The Mokotów Business Park, at Domaniewska Street, built between 1995 and 2001, became another example of an office building complex built in the neighbourhood. In 2000, Westfield Mokotów (originally known as Galeria Mokotów), one of the largest shopping centres in the city, was opened at 12 Wołoska Street. By 2019, the area included 83 office buildings, which were mostly constructed without city oversight and contributed to the development of an office monoculture. In 2015, the area had been estimated to have between 80 and 100 thousand people commuting to work there. The large number of daily commuters, together with local road systems not designed for such volume of traffic, caused regular traffic congestion and lack of availability of parking space in the area, leading to the financial district being colloquially known as Mordor and Mordor on Domaniewska Street. The name referenced Mordor, a fictional location, and personification of evil, from the 1954 fantasy novel The Lord of the Rings written by J. R. R. Tolkien. In 2020, following the petition of local inhabitants, two small streets in the neighbourhood were named after Tolkien and Gandalf, one of the main characters from the book. The traffic situation eventually improved in the 2020s, with the development of new roads, improvement of public transit, and decrease of office space presence in the area.

By the 2010s, almost all of the historical industrial objects were deconstructed and replaced by new office and residential buildings. One of the last remaining artefacts in the neighbourhood, dating to its industrial era, is the Memorial of the Builders of Industrial Służewiec, a socialist realist sculpture depicting a bricklayer, dedicated to people who worked on the construction of the district in the 1950s. It is placed in front of the office building Park Rozwoju, at Suwak Street. Its author and history remain unknown. Until the 2010s, it was placed behind one of the warehouses in the area, and was moved to its current location in 2015.

The high-rise residential buildings begun being constructed in the former industrial area of Służewiec in the 1990s, alongside office buildings, and to their south. While, the region was dominated by office spaces, and considered the largest financial district in Poland, it began losing its status to the Wola district in 2019, with the last office building being built there in 2020. Since then, the number of rented office spaces has begun to steadily decrease, as the neighbourhood transformed into a housing area, with the development of new housing estates throughout the early 2020s, with the estimated population of 31,000 in 2025.

In 2019, the Tram Tradition Chamber was opened in the Mokotów tram depot as a museum of the history of trams in Warsaw.

In December 2024, the Suwak Linear Park was opened, stretching alongside Suwak Street, from Logarytmiczna to Woronicza Streets, on an area of 2 ha.

== Characteristics ==
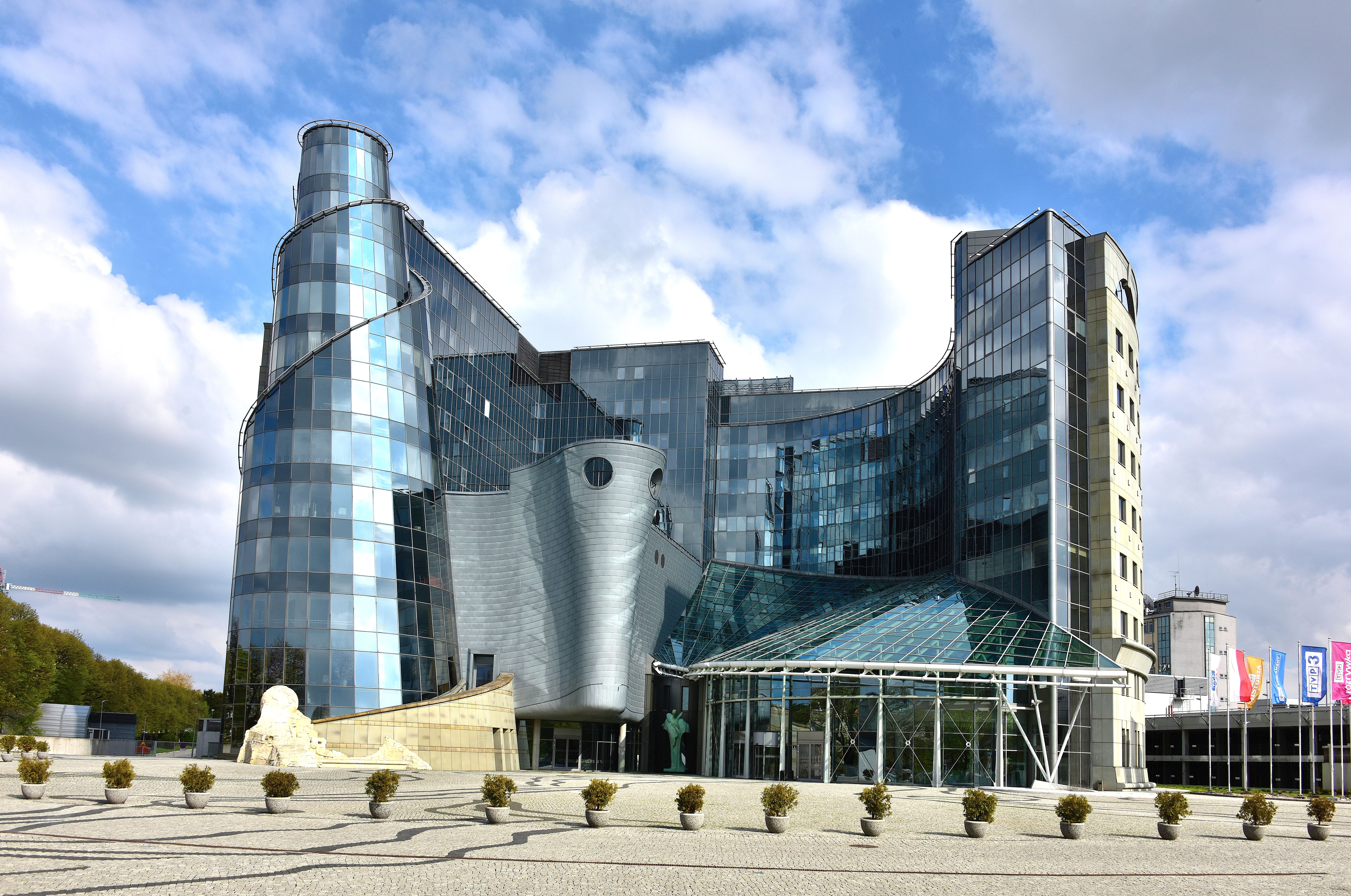
The headquarters of Polish Television.

Mordor is a colloquial name for a financial district in north Służewiec and west Ksawerów, with complexes of office buildings, many including headquarters of numerous domestic companies, and branches of many multinational corporations. While the number of rented office spaces in the area had been in decline since 2020, it used to be the largest financial district in Poland from its emergence in the 1990s to 2019, at its peak, including 83 office buildings. The area also features Westfield Mokotów, one of the largest shopping centres in the city, located at 12 Wołoska Street. Additionally, Mordor includes several headquarters of government agencies, including the Institute of National Remembrance, Ministry of the Interior and Administration, National Appeals Chamber, the National Fund for Environmental Protection and Water Management, National Public Prosecutor's Office, and Polish Post. Moreover, it features the headquarters of the Polish Television, a state media public broadcasting television network of Poland. The Institute of Ceramics and Building Materials of the Łukasiewicz Research Network, a national research institute of processing of nonmetal resources, including the manufacture of ceramics and building materials, mineral binding agents, and concrete, is also present in the district.

The area includes the Warszawa Służewiec railway station at Logarytmiczna Street, forming part of the railway line no. 8 between stations Warsaw West and Kraków Main stations, operated by the Polish State Railways. In 2021, it served 657,000 passengers. The area is also connected to the tramway network, with tracks built alongside Woronicza, Wołoska, and Marynarska Streets, and ending with a turning loop near Suwak Street, and features the Mokotów tram depot and Woronicza bus depot at Woronicza Street. The prior houses the Tram Tradition Chamber, the museum of the history of trams in Warsaw.

The neighbourhood also includes the Suwak Linear Park, stretching behind the buildings of Suwak Street, from Sasanki to Woronicza Streets, with an area of 2 ha. Additionally, the Monument to the Builders of Industrial Służewiec is displayed nearby at Suwak Street. It is a socialist realism sculpture depicting a bricklayer, dedicated to those who worked on the construction of the industrial district of Służewiec in the 1950s.
