= Centrum Biurowe Neptun =

Office skyscraper in Gdańsk, Poland

- The building in 2023.

General information
- Type: Office skyscraper
- Location: 103A Grunwaldzka Street, Wrzeszcz Górny, Gdańsk, Pomeranian Voivodeship, Poland
- Coordinates: 54°22′46.23″N 18°36′18.25″E
- Construction started: March 2012
- Completed: January 2014
- Opened: 27 March 2014
- Cost: 77 million Polish zloties

Height
- Architectural: 84 metres (276 ft)
- Roof: 85 metres (279 ft)

Technical details
- Floor count: 19
- Floor area: 21,600 m^{2} (233,000 ft^{2})

Design and construction
- Architecture firm: Aedas
- Developer: Globe Trade Centre
- Main contractor: Budimex

Centrum Biurowe Neptun (Polish: [ˈt͡sɛn.trum bjuˈrɔ.vɛ ˈnɛp.tun]; lit. 'Neptune Office Centre') is a skyscraper office building in the city of Gdańsk in Pomeranian Voivodeship, Poland, located at 103A Grunwald Avenue, within the district of Wrzeszcz Górny. It measures 84 metres (276 ft) in height. Opened in 2014, i was the city's tallest building until 2018, today being at the second place.

== History ==
The building was designed by the Hong Kong-based architectural firm Aedas, with Warsaw-based company Budimex being the main contractor. It was an investment of the company Globe Trade Centre, costing around 77 million Polish zloties. It was built from March 2012 to January 2014. The building was opened on 27 March 2014. With the height of 85 metres (279 ft), it was the tallest building in Gdańsk, until 2018, when its lost the title to Olivia Star, which forms a part of the business park Olivia Centre.

== Characteristics ==
The building has 19 storeys with a total height of 85 metres (279 ft), making it the second tallest building in the city. The property meets the requirements of the international BREEAM environmental certificate. It has a floor area of 21,600 m^{2} (233,000 ft^{2}), of which 15,000 m^{2} (160,000 ft^{2}) is used for office spaces, and 1,100 m^{2} (12,000 ft^{2}) for the shopping and services, including restaurants.
