= Ksawerów Manor House =

Manor house in Warsaw, Poland

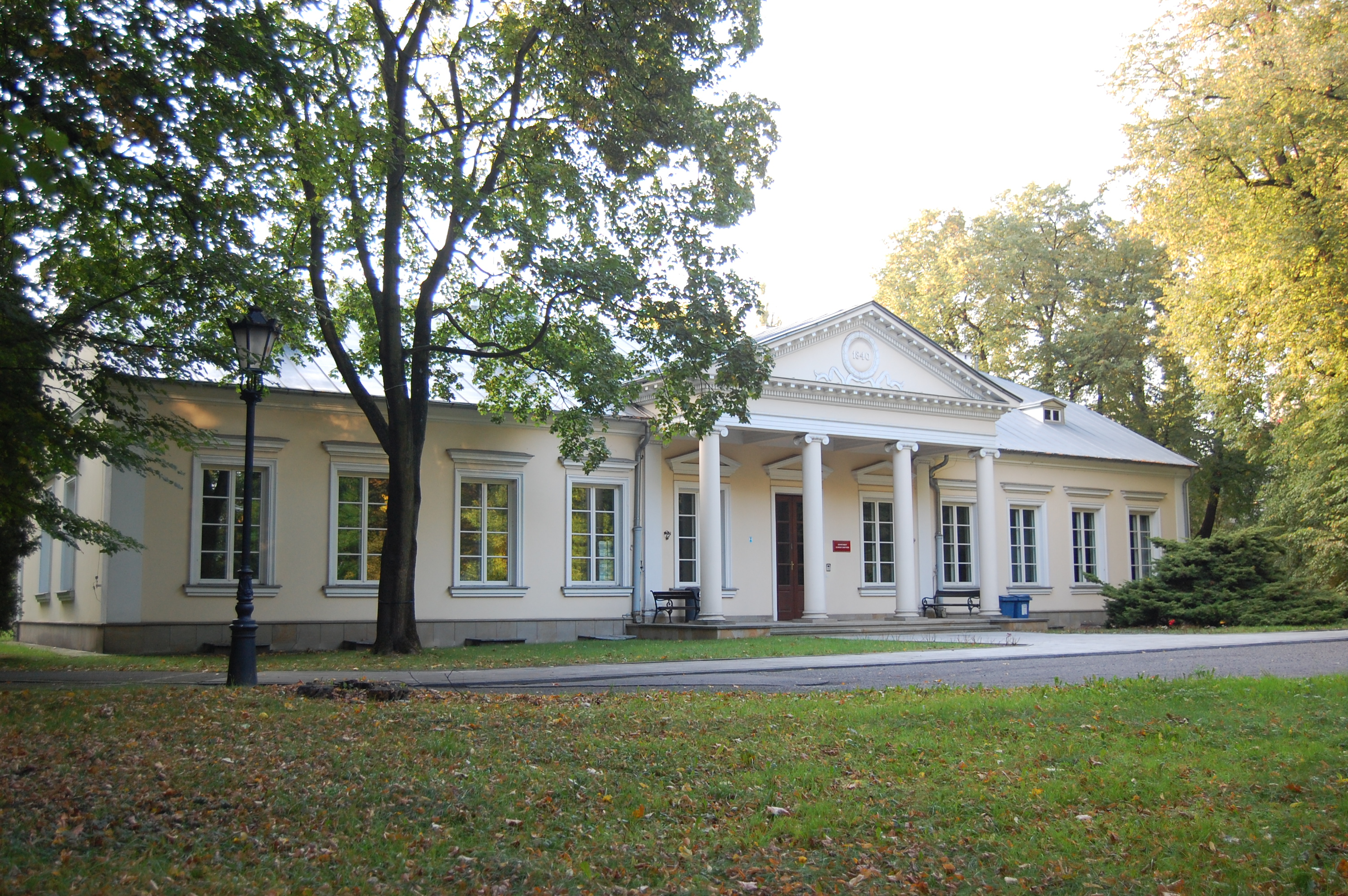
- The Ksawerów Manor House in 2012.
- Interactive map of the Ksawerów Manor House area

General information
- Architectural style: Neoclassical
- Location: Warsaw, Poland, 13 Ksawerów Street
- Coordinates: 52°11′12″N 21°01′13″E
- Completed: 1840

Design and construction
- Architect: Wojciech Bobiński
- Developer: Ksawer Pusłowski

The Ksawerów Manor House (Polish pronunciation: [ksaˈvɛr.uf]; Polish: Dwór Ksawerów) is a neoclassical manor house in Warsaw, Poland, located at 13 Ksawerów Street. The building was designed by Wojciech Bobiński, and constructed in 1840, as the residence for nobleperson Ksawer Pusłowski.

== History ==
The Ksawerów Manor House was designed by architect Wojciech Bobiński, and built in 1840, as a residence for nobleperson Ksawer Pusłowski. A road, now known as Ksawerów Street, was also built next to it. The manor house was built in the southern portion in the village of Wierzbno, which is a now part of Warsaw. Eventually, the area has developed into its own settlement, known as Ksawerów. Later, the building was further expanded with an extension in the back.

During the Second World War, the building was damaged in 1939 and destroyed in 1944, and reconstructed in 1945. The building was renovated in 2016. Currently, it houses the headquarters of the Department of Heritage Protection of the Ministry of Culture and National Heritage.

== Characteristics ==
The manor house was designed in the neoclassical style, and has the floor plan in the shape of the letter T. It is one-storey-tall, and has a Ionic order portico with four columns. Around the building is a small park area.

The building houses the headquarters of the Department of Heritage Protection of the Ministry of Culture and National Heritage.
