= List of financial districts =

A financial district is usually a central area in a city where financial services firms such as banks, insurance companies, and other related finance corporations have their headquarters offices. In major cities, financial districts often host skyscrapers and other buildings of architectural importance and are called financial centres; such major centres also include important financial utilities such as stock exchanges and the offices of the main financial regulatory authorities.

== List ==
Notable financial districts around the world include the following:

=== Africa ===
==== Algeria ====
- Algiers (الجزائر): Bab Ezzouar (باب الزوار) Belouizdad, Algiers (بلوزداد) Hydra, Algiers (حيدرة)

==== Egypt ====
- Cairo: Downtown Cairo
- Giza: Mohandessin
- Alexandria: Central District
- Port Said: East Port Said
- New Capital: Central Business District

==== Kenya ====
- Nairobi: Upper Hill

==== Nigeria ====
- Lagos: Lagos Island, Marina

Lagos is a financial district.

==== Mauritius ====
- Port Louis: Place D'armes

Place D’ armes is financial district in Port Louis

==== Morocco ====
- Casablanca (الدار البيضاء): Anfa (أنفا), Maârif (المعاريف), Sidi Belyout (سيدي بليوط), Sidi Maârouf (سيدي معروف), Bouskoura (بو سكورة)

==== South Africa ====
- Johannesburg: Sandton
- Cape Town: Cape Town CBD

=== Americas ===
==== Argentina ====
- Buenos Aires: Microcentro and Diagonal Norte
- Córdoba: Central Area (Centro, Alto Alberdi, Alberdi, Barrio Nueva Córdoba, Gral. Pueyrredón)
- Rosario: Puerto Norte and Córdoba Avenue

==== Brazil ====
- Rio de Janeiro: Centro
- São Paulo: Alphaville, Brooklin Novo, Central Zone, Brigadeiro Faria Lima Avenue, Paulista Avenue, and Vila Olímpia

==== Canada ====
- Montreal: Saint Jacques Street
- Toronto: Financial District (Bay Street, a metonym for the district)
- Vancouver: Financial District

==== Chile ====
- Santiago: Sanhattan

==== Mexico ====
- Guadalajara: Puerta de Hierro
- Mexico City: Polanco, Paseo de la Reforma, and Santa Fe
- Monterrey: Valle Oriente
- Puebla: Angelópolis

==== Paraguay ====
- Asunción: Aviadores del Chaco Avenue

==== Peru ====
- Lima: San Isidro, Miraflores and Historic Centre
- Arequipa: Cayma

==== United States ====
- Atlanta: Buckhead
- Boston: Financial District
- Charlotte: Uptown
- Chicago: the Loop
- Cincinnati: Financial District
- Denver: Financial District
- Detroit: Financial District
- Greenwich, Connecticut: Downtown Greenwich
- Hartford, Connecticut: Financial District
- Houston: Downtown, Uptown
- Jacksonville: Laura Street
- Los Angeles: Financial District
- Miami: Brickell
- New Orleans: Central Business District
- New York City: Financial District
- New York City: Midtown Manhattan
- Philadelphia: Penn Center
- Salt Lake City: Financial District
- San Francisco: Financial District
- San Juan: Milla de Oro
- Seattle: Financial District
- Stamford, Connecticut: Downtown Stamford
- Des Moines: Financial District

==== Uruguay ====
- Montevideo: Centro and Ciudad Vieja

=== Oceania ===
==== Australia ====
- Sydney: Sydney central business district
- Melbourne: Melbourne central business district
- Brisbane: Brisbane central business district
- Perth: Perth central business district
- Adelaide: Adelaide central business district
- Darwin: Darwin central business district

==== New Zealand ====
- Auckland: Central Business District (CBD)

=== Asia ===
==== Azerbaijan ====
- Baku: Sabail
- Baku: Keshla

==== Bangladesh ====
- Chittagong: Agrabad
- Dhaka: Motijheel
- Dhaka: Gulshan
- Dhaka: Kawran Bazar

==== China ====
- Beijing: Beijing Financial Street
- Shanghai: Lujiazui in Pudong
- Shenzhen: Futian District
- Guangzhou: Zhujiang New Town

==== Hong Kong ====
- Central and Sheung Wan

==== India ====
- Delhi: Connaught Place
- Gandhinagar: GIFT International Financial Services Centre, GIFT City
- Mumbai: Dalal Street, Bandra-Kurla Complex, Fort, Nariman Point, Colaba, Worli and South Mumbai
- Kolkata: B.B.D. Bagh, Park Circus, Salt Lake Sector V, New Town CBD
- Hyderabad: Financial District, Hyderabad, Bank Street, Hyderabad and Gachibowli
- Trivandrum: Technopark
- Navi Mumbai: CBD Belapur

==== Indonesia ====
- Jakarta: Jalan H.R. Rasuna Said, Jalan Jenderal Gatot Subroto, Jalan Jenderal Sudirman, and Jalan M.H. Thamrin

==== Israel ====
- Tel Aviv: Rothschild Boulevard

==== Japan ====
- Nagoya: Naka-ku
- Osaka: Chūō-ku
- Tokyo: Marunouchi, Nihonbashi, and Otemachi

==== Lebanon ====
- Beirut: Central District

==== Malaysia ====
- George Town: George Town CBD
- Kuala Lumpur: Kuala Lumpur City Centre and Tun Razak Exchange (TRX)
- Shah Alam, Selangor: i-City Finance Avenue and i-City (i-City)

==== Pakistan ====
- Karachi: I. I. Chundrigar Road

==== Philippines ====
- Makati: Makati Central Business District
- Pasig: Ortigas Center
- Taguig: Bonifacio Global City

==== Saudi Arabia ====
- Riyadh: King Abdullah Financial District, King Fahad Road, Al Olaya District, Digital City, Riyadh Front, Business Gate and Granada Business.

==== Singapore ====
- Shenton Way, Raffles Place

==== South Korea ====
- Seoul: Downtown Seoul, Yeouido and Teheranno (Gangnam)
- Busan: Nam District

==== Taiwan ====
- Taipei: Xinyi, Taipei Station and East End, Banqiao.
- Taichung: Taichung's 7th Redevelopment Zone
- Kaohsiung: Lingya, Cianjin

==== Thailand ====
- Bangkok: Sathorn and Silom

==== Turkey ====
- Istanbul: Istanbul Financial Center, Levent, Maslak and Ümraniye

==== Vietnam ====
- Ho Chi Minh City: Financial District, Saigon (District 1) and Thủ Thiêm New Urban Area
- Hanoi: Hoàn Kiếm District and Ba Đình District

==== United Arab Emirates (UAE) ====
- Abu Dhabi: Al Maryah Island
- Dubai: Business Bay

=== Europe ===
==== Austria ====
- Vienna: Wienerberg and Donau City

==== Belgium ====
- Brussels: Northern Quarter

==== France ====
- Lille: Euralille
- Lyon: La Part-Dieu
- Marseille: Euroméditerranée
- Paris: La Défense

==== Germany ====
- Berlin: Potsdamer Platz
- Frankfurt: Bankenviertel

==== Greece ====
- Athens: Sofokleous Street
- Thessaloniki, Egnatia Street

==== Ireland ====
- Dublin: International Financial Services Centre (IFSC)

==== Italy ====
- Milan: Centro Direzionale di Milano, Porta Nuova and City life
- Naples: Centro Direzionale di Napoli
- Rome: EUR
- Brescia: Brescia Due
- Livorno: viale Cairoli

==== Lithuania ====
- Vilnius: Vilnius Central Business District

==== Netherlands ====
- Amsterdam: Zuidas and Damrak

==== Norway ====
- Oslo: Sentrum
- Bergen: Bergenhus

==== Poland ====
- Warsaw:
  - Downtown
  - Służewiec (Mordor)
  - Wola
- Katowice: Śródmieście

==== Portugal ====
- Lisbon: Lisbon Baixa, Parque das Nações, Avenidas Novas

==== Romania ====
- Bucharest: Floreasca

==== Russia ====
- Moscow: Moscow International Business Centre, Presnensky District, and Tverskoy District

==== Spain ====
- Barcelona: 22@ and Granvia l'Hospitalet
- Madrid: AZCA and CTBA

==== Switzerland ====
- Zurich: Paradeplatz

==== Turkey ====
- Istanbul: Levent, Maslak

==== United Kingdom ====
- London: City of London, Lombard Street, London and Canary Wharf
- Leeds: Financial Quarter
- Glasgow: International Financial Services District

== See also ==
- Central business district
- Financial centre
