= Służewiec =

Neighbourhood of Warsaw, Poland

- City Information System area (neighbourhood)
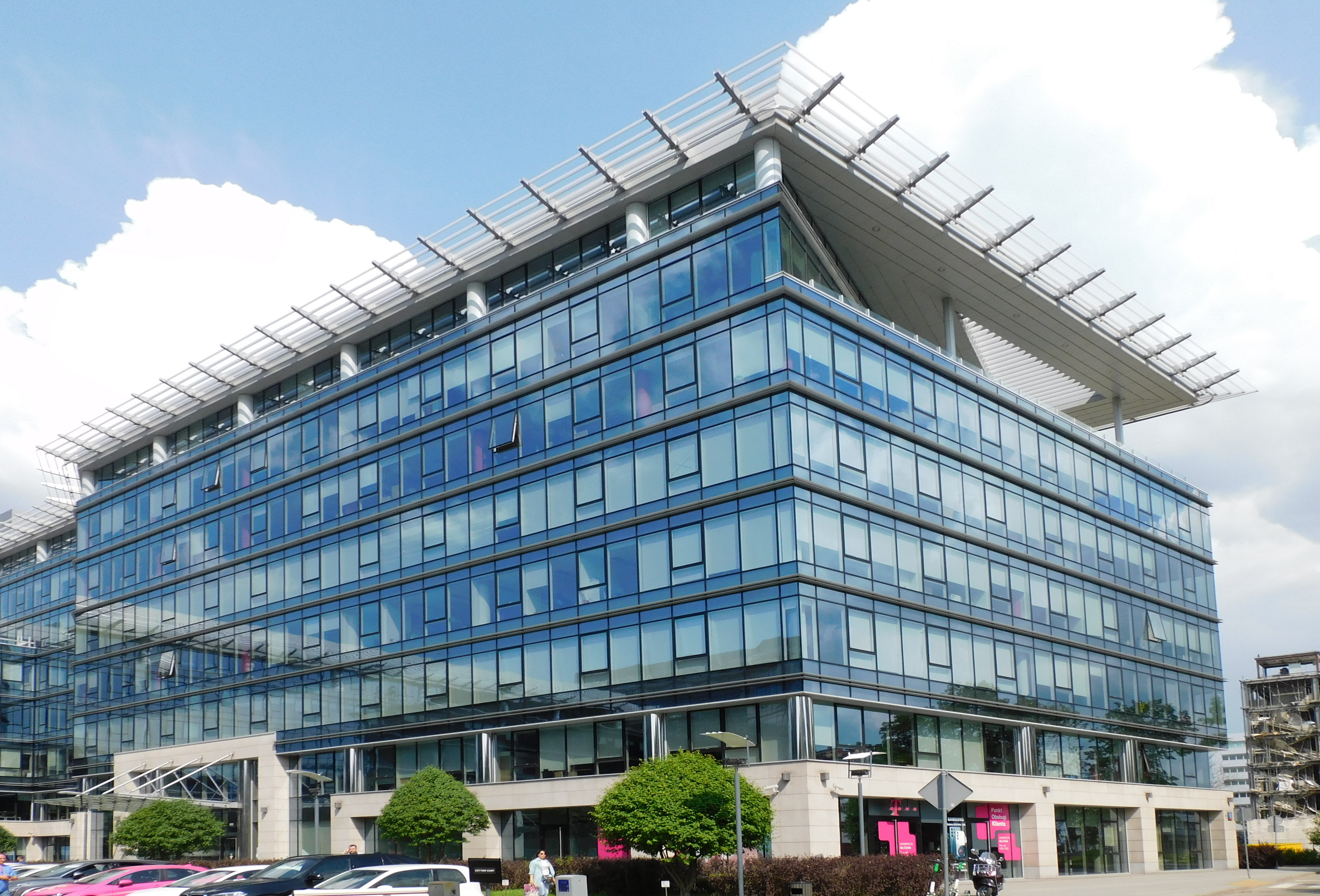
- An office building on Marynarska Street.

- The location of Służewiec within the Mokotów district.
- Coordinates: 52°10′47″N 20°59′38″E
- Country: Poland
- Voivodeship: Masovian
- City and county: Warsaw
- District: Mokotów
- Subdistrict: Upper Mokotów
- Administrative neighbourhood: Służewiec Południowy

Population (2025)
  - Total: c. 31,000
- Time zone: UTC+1 (CET)
  - Summer (DST): UTC+2 (CEST)
- Area code: +48 22

Służewiec (Polish: [swuˈʐɛ.vjɛt͡s]) is a neighbourhood, and a City Information System area, in Warsaw, Poland, within the Mokotów district. It is a mixed high-rise area with residential and office buildings, with a population estimated at around 31,000 in 2025. Together with the nearby neighbourhood of Ksawerów, its portion forms a financial district, colloquially referred to as Mordor. It includes the headquarters of numerous domestic companies, and branches of many multinational corporations. The neighbourhood also features the Warszawa Służewiec railway station. The area is part of the western half of the city district, known as Upper Mokotów.

The oldest known records of Służewiec, then a village, date to 1378. It was incorporated into the city of Warsaw in 1938, and was destroyed in 1944, during the Second World War. The neighbourhood was re-developed as a major industrial district in the 1950s, known as Służewiec Przemysłowy (Industrial Służewiec), and in the 1990s, it transformed into the largest financial district in Poland, and remained as such until 2019. Afterwards, the rented office spaces in the area began to decline, as it converted into a residential district.

== Toponomy ==
The name Służewiec comes from the nearby neighbourhood, and historically a village, of Służew, known until the 16th century as Służewo. It originates from the archaic Polish word służ, an equivalent to modern służyć, which means to serve. It came from the fact that historically the area was inhabited by serfs, peasants who served the local noble families. Służewiec itself was part of the agricultural estate centred around Służew.

== History ==
=== Village and suburb ===
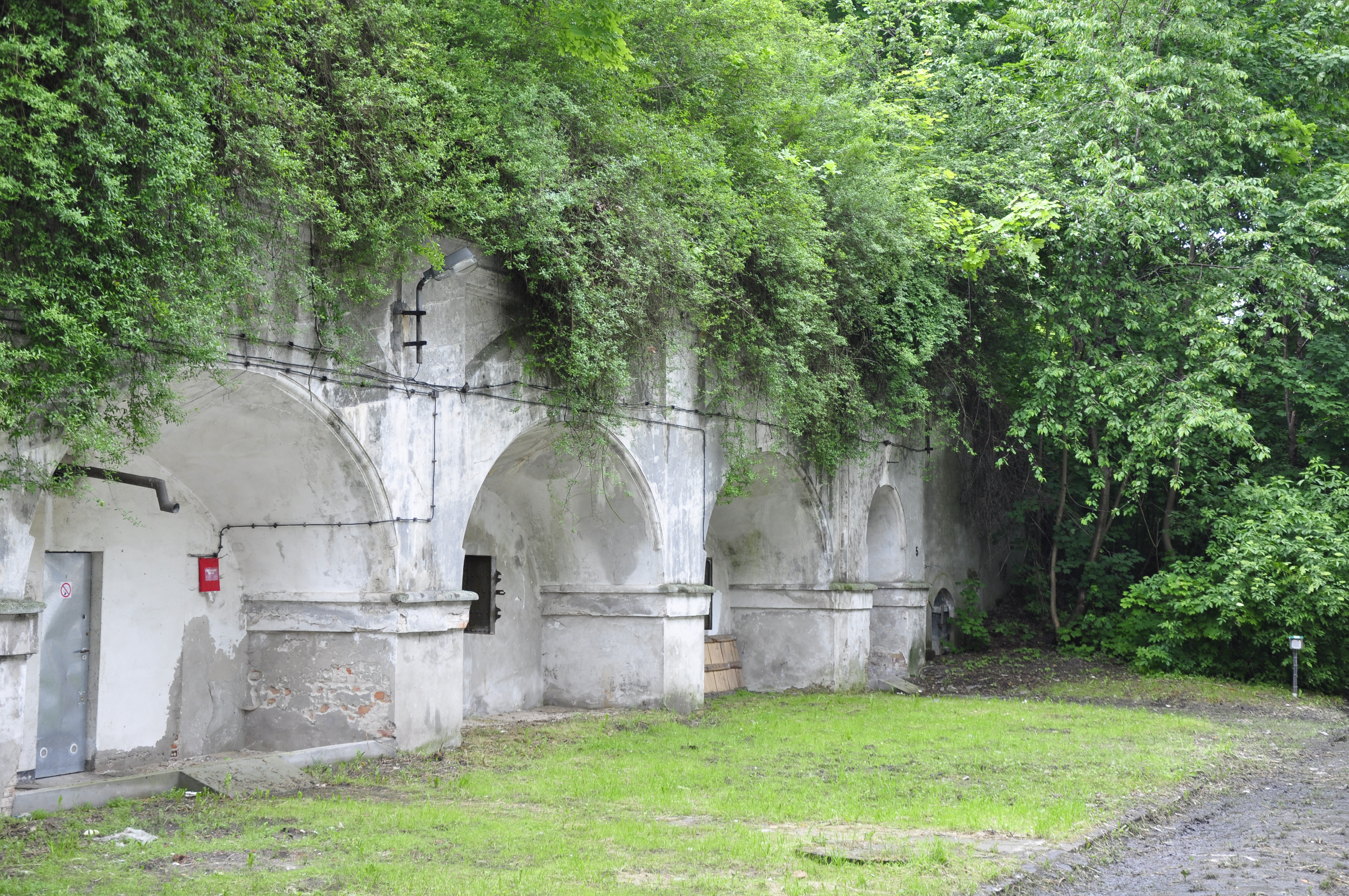
The ruins of the Fort VIIA "Służewiec", built in 1886.

Służewiec was settled alongside the Sadurka stream. Its oldest known records in documentation come from 1378, when, it was listed as one of 17 villages of the agricultural estate of Służew. At the time, it was a small farming community attached to the nearby village of Służew, with a farmland area of 9 voloks (1.616 km^{2}), making it the largest on the list. In 1411, Służewiec was granted the Kulm law privileges by duke Janusz I the Old, ruler of the Duchy of Warsaw. By 1580, it was inhabited by the petty nobility. In 1678, Służewiec and Służewo were bought by Stanisław Herakliusz Lubomirski becoming part of his landed property.

On 13 January 1867, Służewiec became part of the rural municipality of Wilanów, established as part of the administrative reform in the Kingdom of Poland.

In 1886, the Fort VIIA "Służewiec" was built near the village, as part of the series of fortifications of the Warsaw Fortress, constructed around the city by the Imperial Russian Army. The objective of the fort had been the protection of the nearby road leading to the town of Puławy, now forming Puławska Street. It was decided to be decommissioned in 1909 and partially demolished in 1913. Currently, the building is located within the City Information System area of Służew.

In 1903, the Służewiec narrow-gauge railway station, operated by the Grójec Commuter Railway, was opened, as part of the line between stations of Warszawa Mokotów and Nowe Miasto nad Pilicą. It operated until 31 July 1971, and was located to the south-east of Służewiec, near the current intersection of Puławska, and Dolina Służewiecka Streets, within the modern boundaries of North Ursynów.

Between the 1920s and 1930s, the course of the Sadurka stream, which flowed through Służewiec, was artificially altered to bypass the area.

On 27 September 1938, Służew and Służewiec were incorporated into the city of Warsaw, becoming part of the Mokotów district.

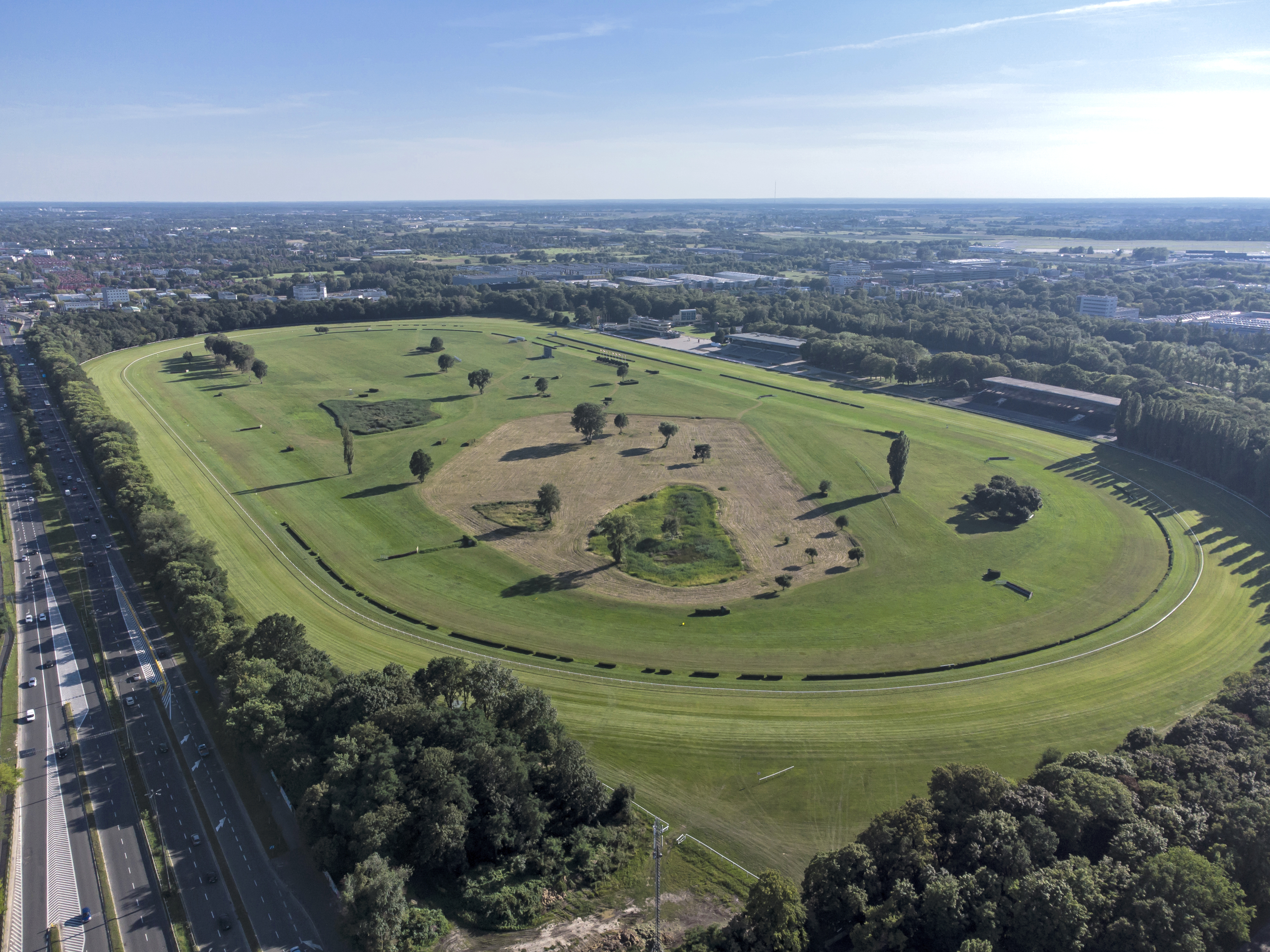
The Służewiec Racecourse, opened in 1939.

Between 1925 and 1939, the Służewiec Racecourse was built at 266 Puławska Street, located to the southeast of the village. Upon its opening, it became the largest and most modern horse racing venue in Europe, with its main circuit measuring 2,300 m. It began hosting the Great Warsaw Race, the most prestigious horse race in Poland. In 1938, the municipal tram network was extended towards the Służewiec Racecourse with tracks built alongside Puławska Street, ending with a turning loop at the current intersection of Dolina Służewiecka and Rzymowskiego Streets. The race track is currently located within the boundaries of North Ursynów.

On 8 September 1939, the area was captured by the German Army, during the siege of Warsaw in the Second World War. On 12 September, a group of soldiers from the 360th Infantry Regiment of the Polish Armed Forces, led by lieutenant colonel Jakub Chmura, together with two tank companies, attacked German positions in the nearby Okęcie. As part of the offensive, a portion of the soldiers, commanded by Czesław Chamerski, and supported by half of a tank battalion, captured the Służewiec Racecourse with light German resistance. From there, it headed towards the Fort VI "Okęcie", being pushed back by heavy fire from fortified German soldiers, eventually retreating at 11:00 am. The Polish side suffered around 80 dead and wounded soldiers, which was around of its 45% forces. While under the occupation, the race track served as an airstrip for the fighter aircraft of the German Air Force. In July 1944, between 600 and 800 German soldiers were stationed there. On 1 August 1944, on the first day of the Warsaw Uprising, Polish resistance participants from the Karpaty Battalion of the Baszta Regiment, carried out an unsuccessful attack on the airstrip, suffering heavy casualties. Later that day, in retaliation, the German forces organised an execution at the racecourse, killing captured partisans and a group of civilians, rounded up in the nearby Służew. Służewiec was completely destroyed in 1944 by the German officers, as part of the planned destruction of Warsaw. The only surviving historical structure is a small Roman Catholic shrine located at the Bokserska Street.

=== Industrial district ===
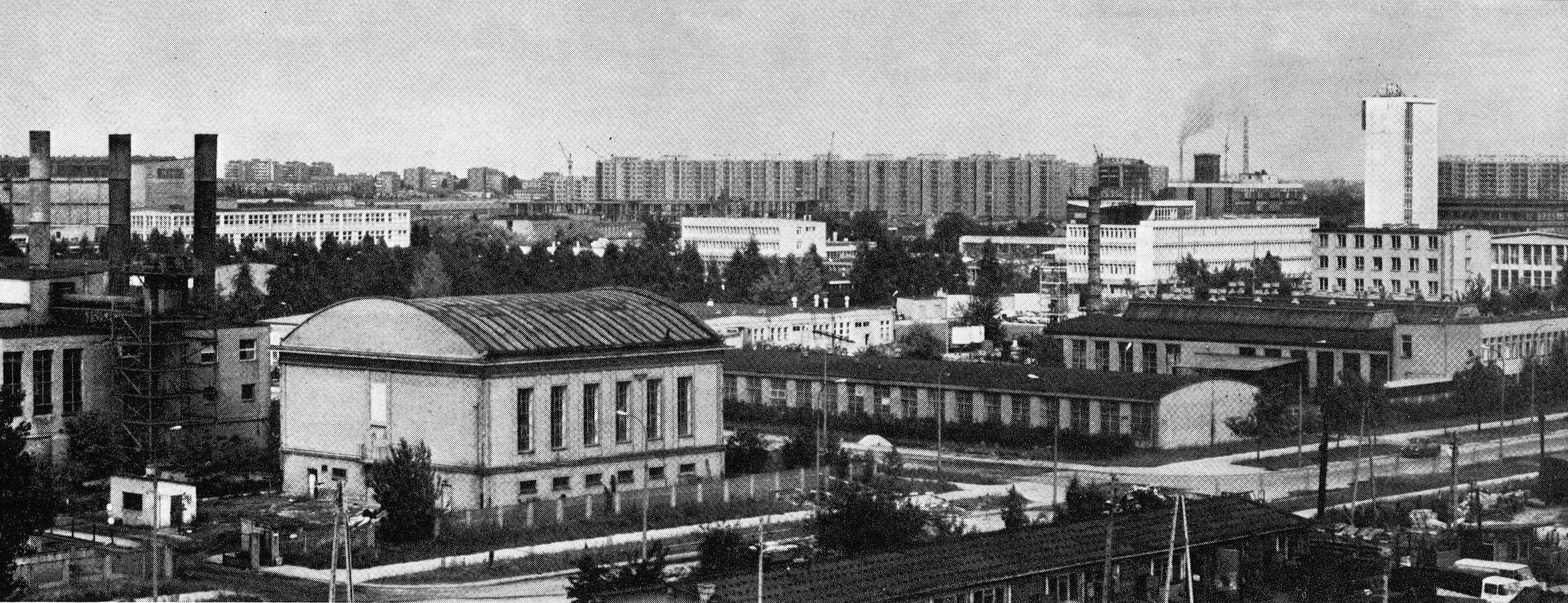
The general view of the industrial area of Służewiec in the 1970s.

In 1951, the area of Służewiec, Zbarż, and Wyczółki, was designated to become the Industrial and Storage District of Służewiec (Polish: Dzielnica Przemysłowo-Składowa „Służewiec”), later known as Służewiec Przemysłowy (Industrial Służewiec). It was envisioned to feature 60 factories and industrial plants. The construction begun in 1952, and utilized the large panel system technique, marking it as one of the first instances of its usage in Poland. The designated area covered around 2.6 km^{2} (1 sq mi). In the early 1970s, around 20,000 people were employed in the industrial district.

In 1951, the Institute of Organisation and Mechanisation of Construction was founded. It was renamed in 1973 to the Institute of Construction Mechanisation, and again in 1986, to the Institute of Mechanised Construction and Rock Mining, becoming a research facility for the mechanisation of construction, and development of machinery for construction, road, building materials industry and rock mining. It had its headquarters at 6 and 8 Racjonalizacji Street. It operated until 2023, when it merged with the Institute of Precision Mechanics to form the Warsaw Institute of Technology, with its headquarters in the Żoliborz district.

In 1953, the Mokotów trams depot was opened at 27 Woronicza Street In 1959, the Woronicza bus depot was also opened on the other side of the road, at 29 Woronicza Street. In 1961, the neighbourhood was connected to the tram network, with tracks built alongside Wołoska and Marynarska Streets, and ending with a turning loop near Suwak Street. In 1962, the Warszawa Służewiec railway station, was opened at Logarytmiczna Street.

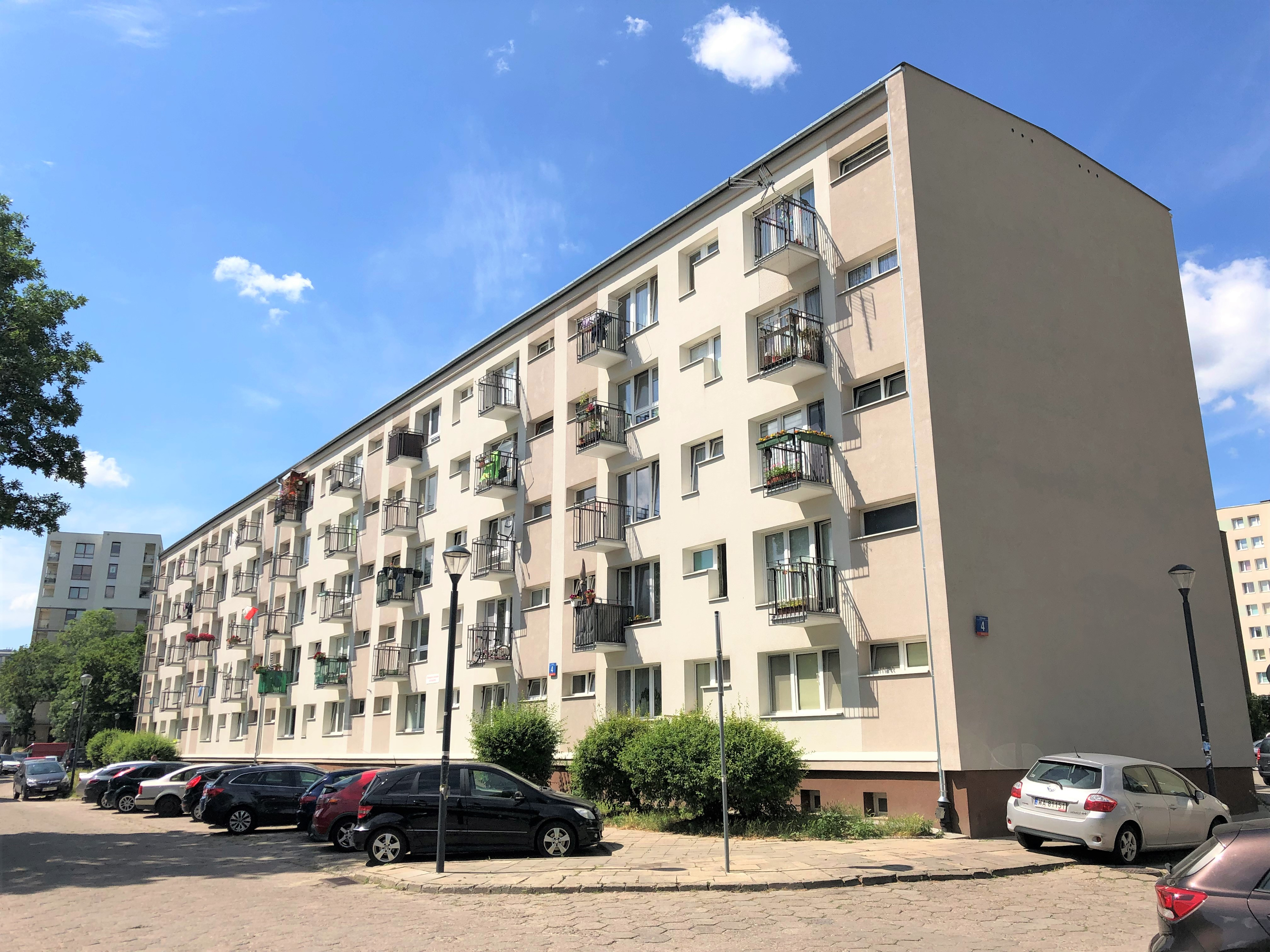
One of the apartment buildings of the housing estate of Służewiec-Prototypy built in the 1960s.

Between 1960 and 1965, the housing estate of Służewiec-Prototypy, was built to the east of the industrial area, between Lotników Avenue, Modzelewskiego Street, Bokserska Street, and Obrzeżna Street, with Rzymowskiego Street as its main axis. Consisting of high-rise multifamily buildings, the neighbourhood was constructed as a test ground for new technologies and urbanist solutions, such as various large-panel-system building techniques. The observation of various types of building techniques during and after their construction was intended to allow for the improvement of new projects, comparison of existing ones and implementation of cost-reducing solutions. It was the first and the largest research ground of its kind in Poland. The neighbourhood was designed with modernist apartment buildings. The neighbourhood was intended to provide housing for the employees of numerous factories in the nearby industrial district, located within walking distance of it. Currently, it is located within the City Information System area of Służew.

In 1961, the headquarters of the Łukasiewicz Institute of Ceramics and Building Materials of the Łukasiewicz Research Network, then known as the Institute of Glass and Ceramics Industry, were moved to 9 Postępu Street in Służewiec. Currently, it is a national research institute of processing of nonmetal resources, including the manufacture of ceramics and building materials, mineral binding agents, and concrete.

=== Financial and residential district ===
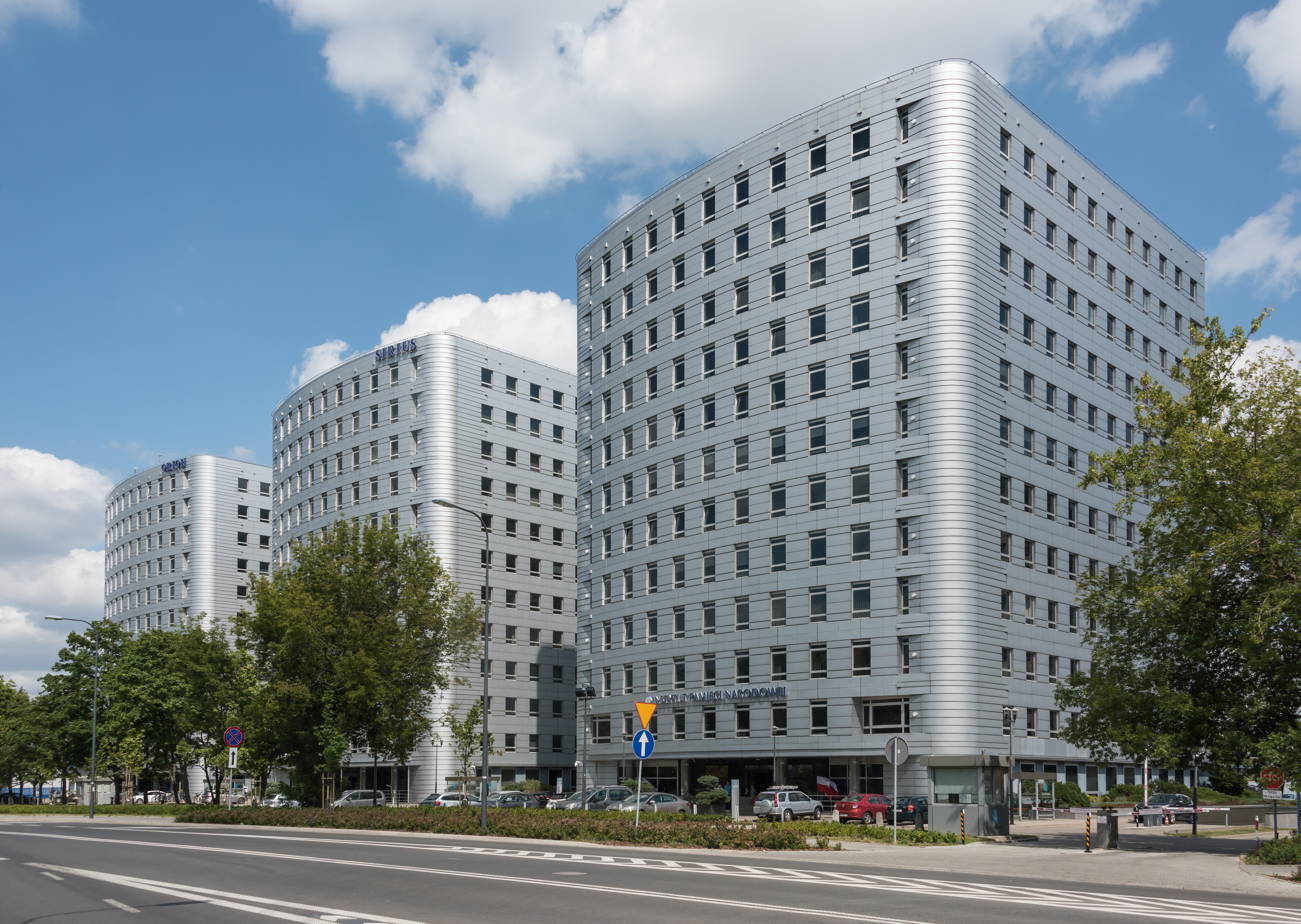
The Mokotów Business Park office complex built between 1995 and 2001.

On 4 October 1996, the district of Mokotów was subdivided into the City Information System areas, with Służewiec becoming one of them. In 2001, the administrative neighbourhood of Służewiec Południowy (South Służewiec), governed by an elected neighbourhood council, was established in an area covering southern Służewiec and south-eastern Służew.

In the 1990s, the manufacturing industry left the area, leading to the emergence of a financial district, with the development of large office complexes, eventually becoming the largest in Poland. In 1992, Curtis Plaza, located at 18 Wołoska Street at the boundary of Służewiec and Ksawerów, became one of the first office buildings constructed in the area. It was considered a prime example of postmodern architecture in the city, and was eventually demolished in 2024. The Mokotów Business Park, at Domaniewska Street, built between 1995 and 2001, became another example of an office building complex built in the neighbourhood. In 2000, Westfield Mokotów (originally known as Galeria Mokotów), one of the largest shopping centres in the city, was opened at 12 Wołoska Street, on the boundary of Służewiec and Ksawerów. By 2019, the area included 83 office buildings, which were mostly constructed without city oversight and contributed to the development of an office monoculture. In 2015, the area had been estimated to have between 80 and 100 thousand people commuting to work there, in comparison to around 15,000 residents. The large number of daily commuters, together with local road systems not designed for such volume of traffic, caused regular traffic congestion and lack of availability of parking space in the area, leading to the financial district being colloquially known as Mordor and Mordor on Domaniewska Street. The name referenced Mordor, a fictional location, and personification of evil, from the 1954 fantasy novel The Lord of the Rings written by J. R. R. Tolkien. In 2020, following the petition of local inhabitants, two small streets in the neighbourhood were named after Tolkien and Gandalf, one of the main characters from the book. The traffic situation eventually improved in the 2020s, with the development of new roads, improvement of public transit, and decrease of office space presence in the area.

By the 2010s, almost all of the historical industrial objects were deconstructed and replaced by new office and residential buildings. One of the last remaining artefacts in the neighbourhood, dating to its industrial era, is the Memorial of the Builders of Industrial Służewiec, a socialist realist sculpture depicting a bricklayer, dedicated to people who worked on the construction of the district in the 1950s. It is placed in front of the office building Park Rozwoju, at Suwak Street. Its author and history remain unknown. Until the 2010s, it was placed behind one of the warehouses in the area, and was moved to its current location in 2015.

The high-rise residential buildings begun being constructed in the former industrial area of Służewiec in the 1990s, alongside office buildings. While, the region was dominated by office spaces, and considered the largest financial district in Poland, it began losing its status to the Wola district in 2019, with the last office building being built there in 2020. Since then, the number of rented office spaces begun to steadily decrease, as the neighbourhood begun transforming into a housing area, with the development of new housing estates throughout the early 2020s, with the estimated population of around 31,000 in 2025.

In 2019, the Tram Tradition Chamber was opened in the Mokotów tram depot as a museum of the history of trams in Warsaw.

In December 2024, the Suwak Linear Park was opened, stretching alongside Suwak Street, from Logarytmiczna to Woronicza Streets, on an area of 2 ha.

== Characteristics ==
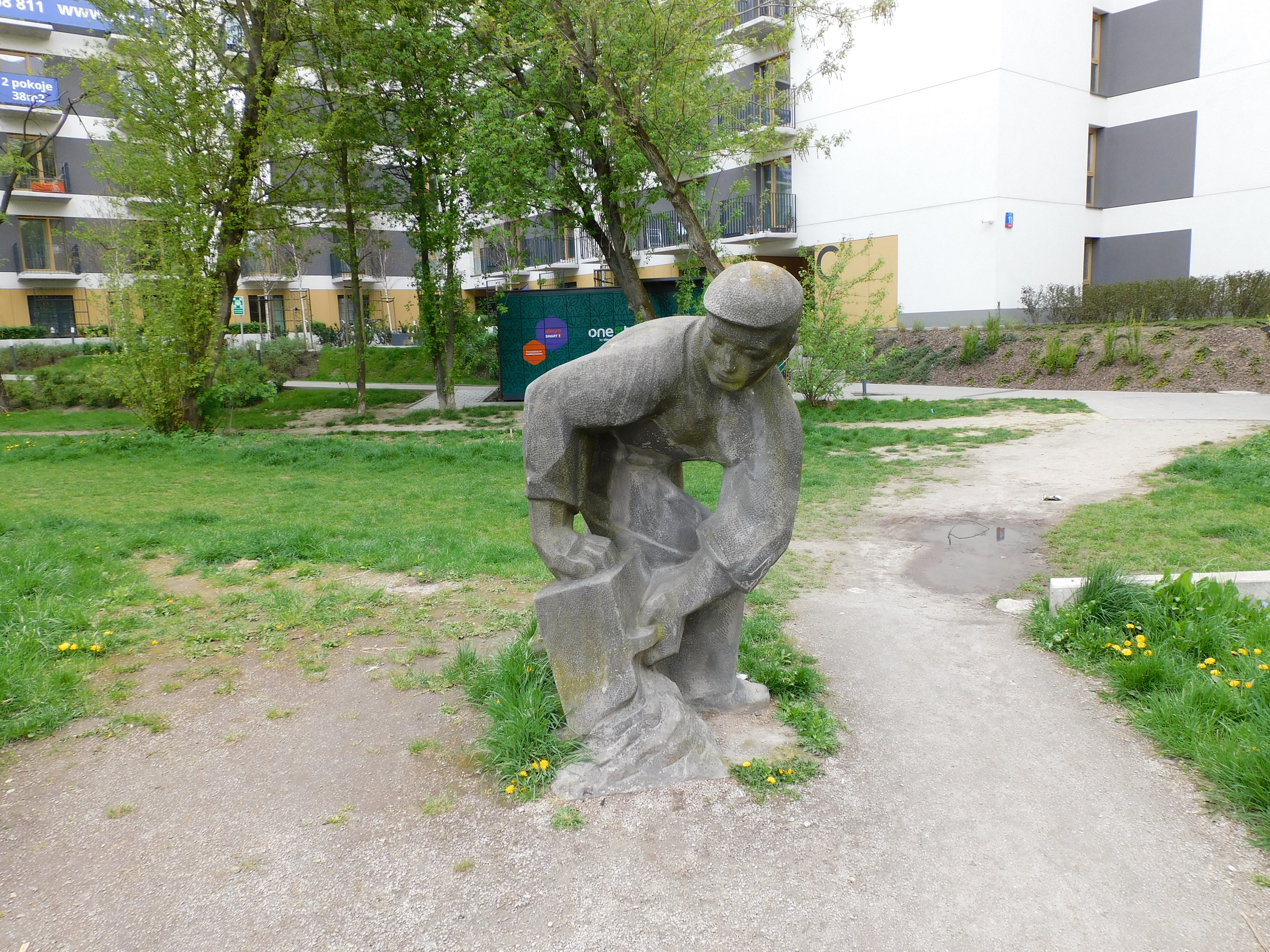
The Memorial to the Builders of Industrial Służewiec, dating to the 1950s.

Służewiec is a mixed high-rise area is residential and office buildings. It includes several housing estates of apartment buildings, with an estimated population of around 31,000 inhabitants in 2025. The area features a large number of office complexes, forming a financial district together with the nearby neighbourhood of Ksawerów, many including headquarters of numerous domestic companies, and branches of many multinational corporations. It is colloquially referred to as Mordor, and Mordor at Domaniewska, reference to Mordor, a fictional location, and personification of evil, from the 1954 fantasy novel The Lord of the Rings written by J. R. R. Tolkien. It was originally coined as a critique of the terrible road traffic conditions in the area in the 2010s. Two small streets in the neighbourhood are also named after Tolkien and Gandalf, one of the main characters from the book. While the number of rented office spaces in the area had been in decline since 2020, it used to be the largest financial district in Poland from its emergence in the 1990s to 2019, at its peak, including 83 office buildings.

Służewiec includes the Warszawa Służewiec railway station at Logarytmiczna Street, forming part of the railway line no. 8 between stations Warsaw West and Kraków Main stations, operated by the Polish State Railways. In 2021, it served 657,000 passengers. The area is also connected to the tramway network, with tracks built alongside Wołoska and Marynarska Streets, and ending with a turning loop near Suwak Street, and features the Mokotów tram depot and Woronicza bus depot, both located at Woronicza Street. The former houses the Tram Tradition Chamber, the museum of the history of trams in Warsaw.

The neighbourhood also includes the Suwak Linear Park, stretching behind the buildings of Suwak Street, from Sasanki to Woronicza Streets, with an area of 2 ha. Additionally, the Monument to the Builders of Industrial Służewiec is displayed nearby at Suwak Street. It is a socialist realism sculpture depicting a bricklayer, dedicated to those who worked on the construction of the industrial district of Służewiec in the 1950s.

Służewiec features several headquarters of government agencies, including the Institute of National Remembrance, the National Appeals Chamber, the National Fund for Environmental Protection and Water Management, and the National Public Prosecutor's Office. It also includes the Institute of Ceramics and Building Materials of the Łukasiewicz Research Network, a national research institute of processing of nonmetal resources, including the manufacture of ceramics and building materials, mineral binding agents, and concrete.

== Boundaries and subdivisions ==
Służewiec is a City Information System area located in the southwest portion of the Mokotów district. Its boundaries are approximately determined to the north by Woronicza Street and in the straight line coming from Miś Roundabout to the western boundary; to the east by Wołoska Street, and Obrzeżna Street; to the south, by Bokserska Street; and to the west by the tracks of the railway line no. 8. It borders Wyględów to the north, Wierzbno to the north-east, Ksawerów, and Służew to the east, Wyczółki to the south, and Okęcie to the west. Its southern and western boundaries form the border of Mokotów, with Ursynów to the south, and Włochy to the west.

The southern part of the area is included within the neighbourhood of Służewiec Południowy (South Służewiec), governed by an elected council. It also contains the southwestern half of the nearby Służew. The area of Służewiec contained within said neighbourhood is located between Marynarska Street, Wołoska Street, Obrzeżna Street, Bokserska Street, and the tracks of the railway line no. 8.
