= Museum of the Polish Peasant Movement =

Ethnographic museum in Poland

Coordinates: 52°10′39″N 21°2′2″E

- Muzeum Historii Polskiego Ruchu Ludowego

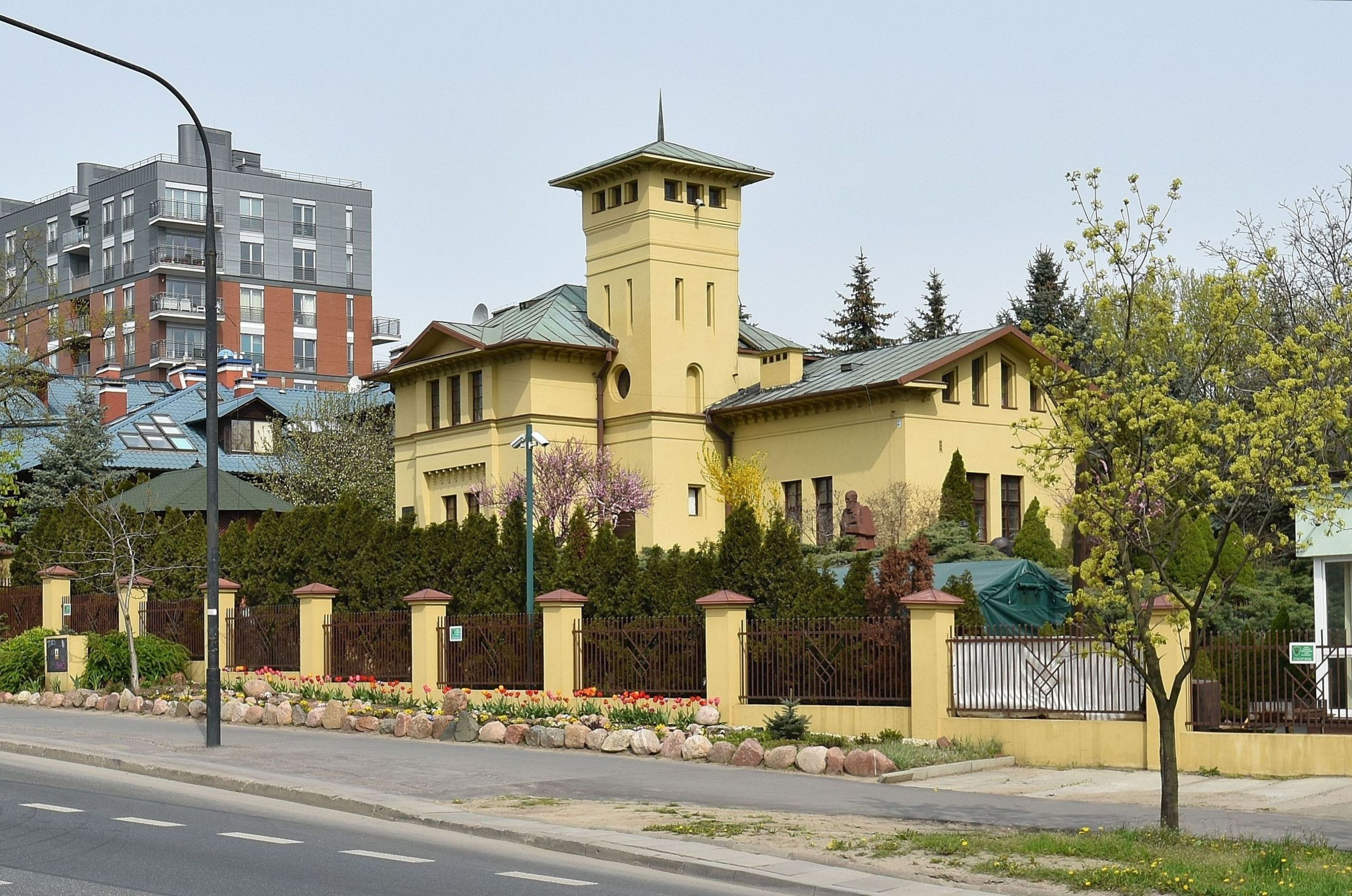
- Established: 1984
- Location: Wilanowska 204; Warsaw, Poland
- Type: history museum
- Website: www.mhprl.pl

The Museum of the Polish Peasant Movement (Polish: Muzeum Historii Polskiego Ruchu Ludowego) is a museum in Warsaw, Poland. It was established in 1984. The museum is located in a building known as the Yellow Tavern (Żółta Karczma) of Służew. Its focus is the history of the Polish countryside, peasant political parties and other groups. It does not have a permanent collection but offers a range of changing exhibitions.
