= Globe Trade Centre =

Polish real estate development group

Globe Trade Centre S.A. (GTC) is a real estate development group established in 1994. Today GTC is one of the leading group in the commercial real estate sector, concentrating its investment activities in Poland and the capitals of Central and Eastern Europe. GTC Group operates in 6 countries: Poland, Hungary, Romania, Serbia, Croatia and Bulgaria. Since its establishment GTC Group has developed both commercial and residential projects. The strategy of GTC focuses on creating modern office and retail facilities that are in line with the sustainable development confirmed by numerous certificates such as LEED and BREEAM certification.

GTC's head office is located in Warsaw.

Since 1994, GTC has developed 76 high-standard, modern office and retail properties with a total area of over 1.3 million sq m through Central and Eastern Europe. The company actively manages a real estate portfolio of 48 commercial buildings providing over 750 thus. sq m of lettable office and retail space in Poland, Budapest, Bucharest, Belgrade, Zagreb and Sofia. Besides, GTC has a development pipeline of 336 thus. sq m retail and office properties in capital cities of Central and Eastern Europe, including 40 thus. sq m under construction.

GTC has been recognized as a leading developer in the CEE region. GTC's most prominent projects include White House (Budapest, Hungary), Ada Mall (Belgrade, Serbia), Green Heart (Belgrade, Serbia) and Galeria Jurajska (Częstochowa, Poland). For its projects, GTC regularly receives industry awards. Over the past few years, GTC Hungary has won HOF AWARDS – Best of the Best 2020 and three awards at the CIJ Awards Hungary 2019. Also, in 2018, GTC Serbia won four awards at CIJ Awards Serbia&SEE 2018.

GTC's shares are listed on the Warsaw Stock Exchange as well as on the Johannesburg Stock Exchange.

GTC activities in Poland

Globe Trade Centre manages 16 office buildings in Cracow, Katowice, Łódź, Poznań, Wrocław, Warsaw and 2 shopping malls: Galeria Północna in Warsaw and Galeria Jurajska in Częstochowa.

List of GTC Polish developments is available on corporate website (link)

GTC projects in other countries

The company operates in 5 foreign markets besides Poland:

· Bucharest: office projects,

· Budapest: office projects,

· Belgrade: office and retail projects,

· Sofia: office and retail projects,

· Zagreb: office and retail projects.

List of GTC foreign developments is available on corporate website (link)

GTC sold investments

So far the developer has sold nearly 40 buildings including Galeria Kazimierz shopping mall, Spiral office building, Galeria Mokotów shopping mall, Prague Marina Office Centre, or Mokotów Business Park. The Group has also built and sold approximately 400,000 sq m of residential space.
