= Westfield Mokotów =

Shopping centre in Warsaw, Poland

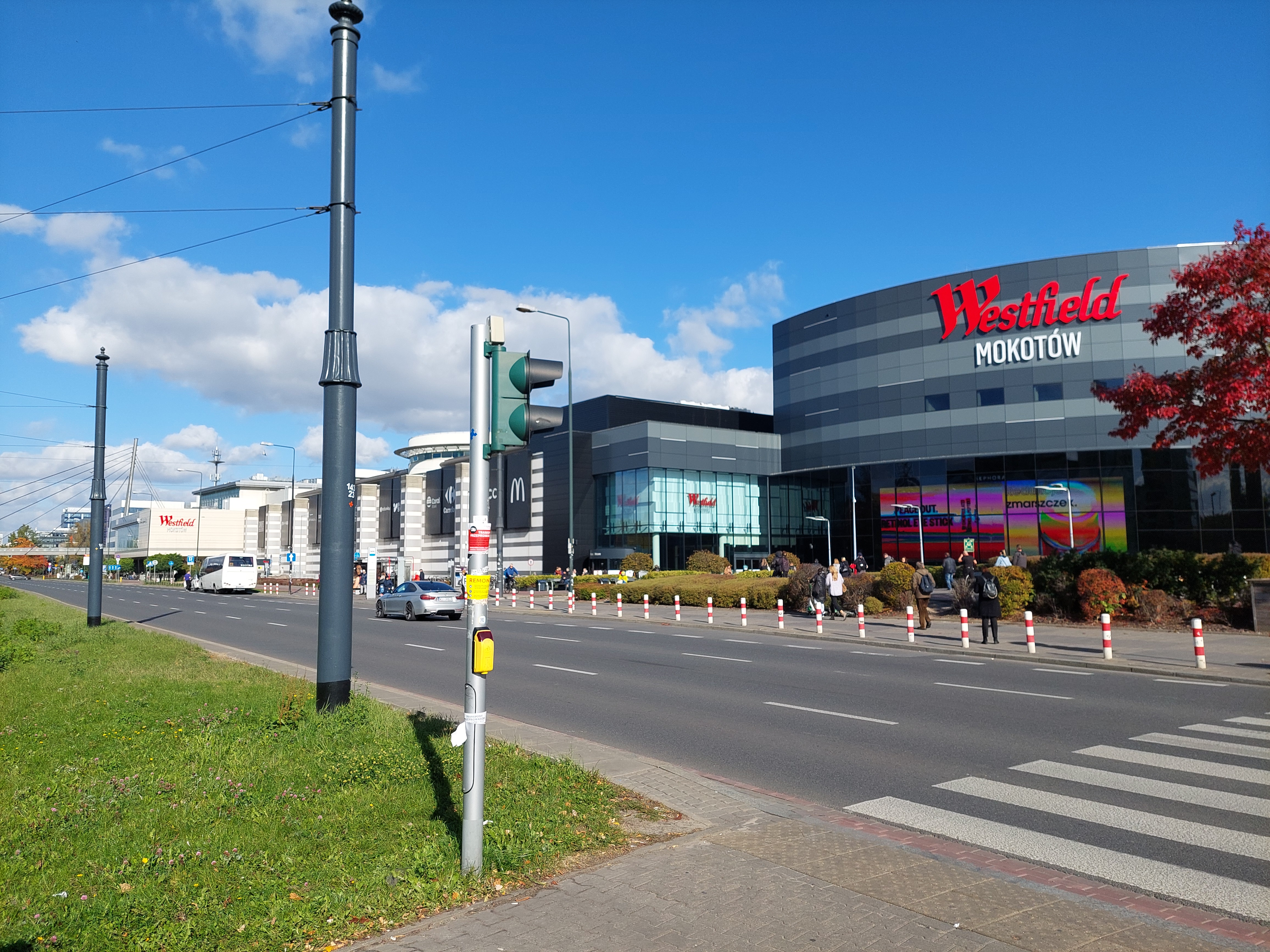
- Westfield Mokotów in 2022
- Interactive map of the Westfield Mokotów area

General information
- Type: Shopping centre
- Architectural style: Modern architecture
- Location: Warsaw, Poland, 12 Wołoska Street
- Coordinates: 52°10′46″N 21°0′15″E
- Construction started: 1998
- Completed: 2000
- Owner: Unibail-Rodamco-Westfield (2011–present); Globe Trade Centre (2000–2011)

Technical details
- Floor count: 3

Website
- pl.westfield.com/mokotow

Westfield Mokotów, previously known as Galeria Mokotów, is a shopping centre in Warsaw, Poland, in the district of Mokotów. It is located at the 12 Wołoska Street. The building was opened in 2000. It was originally owned by Globe Trade Centre, and since 2011, it is owned by Unibail-Rodamco-Westfield.

== Description ==
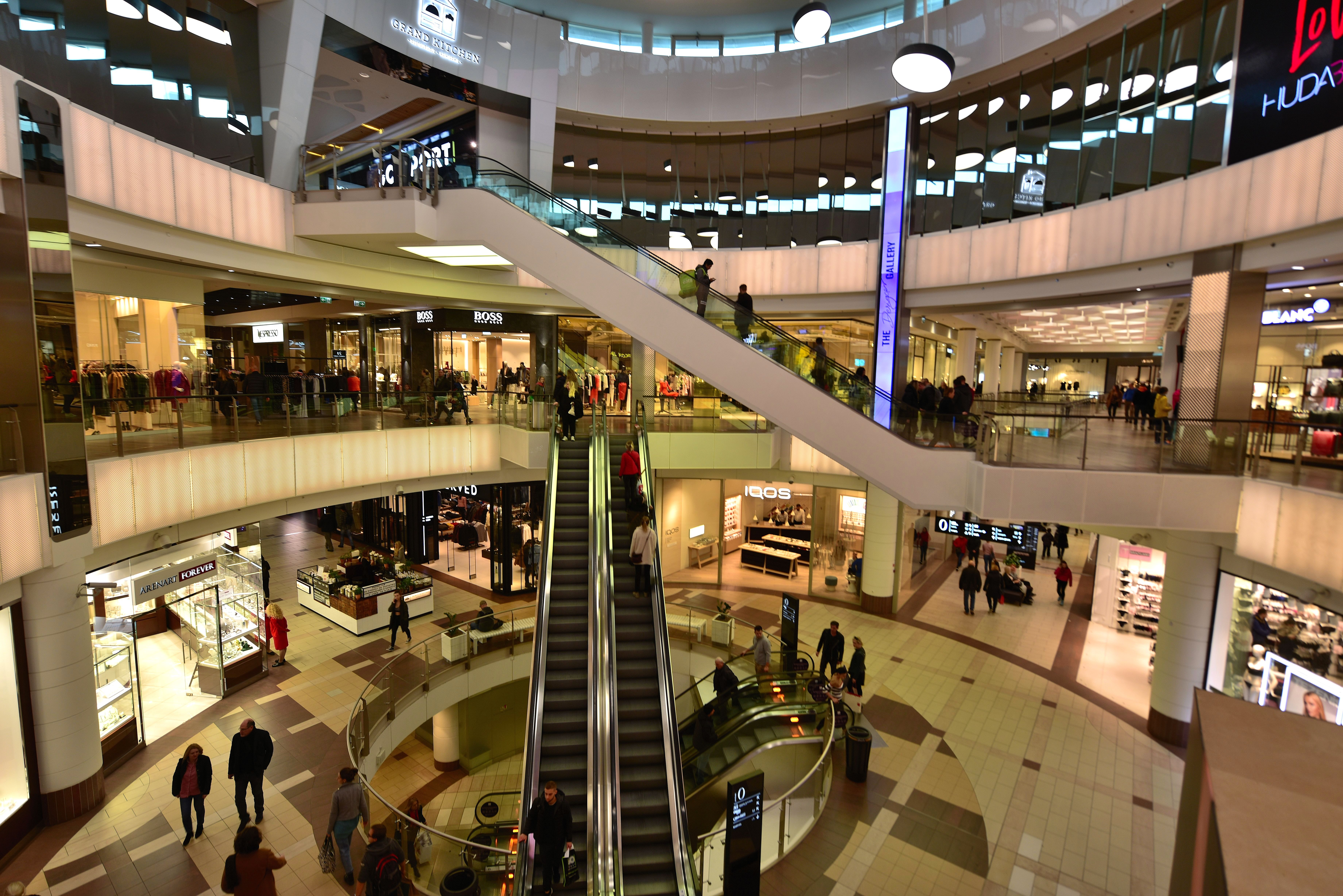
The interior of Westfield Mokotów in 2019.

The building has 3 levels, with the total area of 157.770 m², which includes 62.500 m² of shopping area. It is one of the biggest shopping centres in Warsaw, and Poland. As of September 2020, the shopping centre 260 stores and service centres, a food court, a cinema, and a health club. On the roof of the building is located an apiary. Every month, the shopping centre is visited by over a million guests.

== History ==
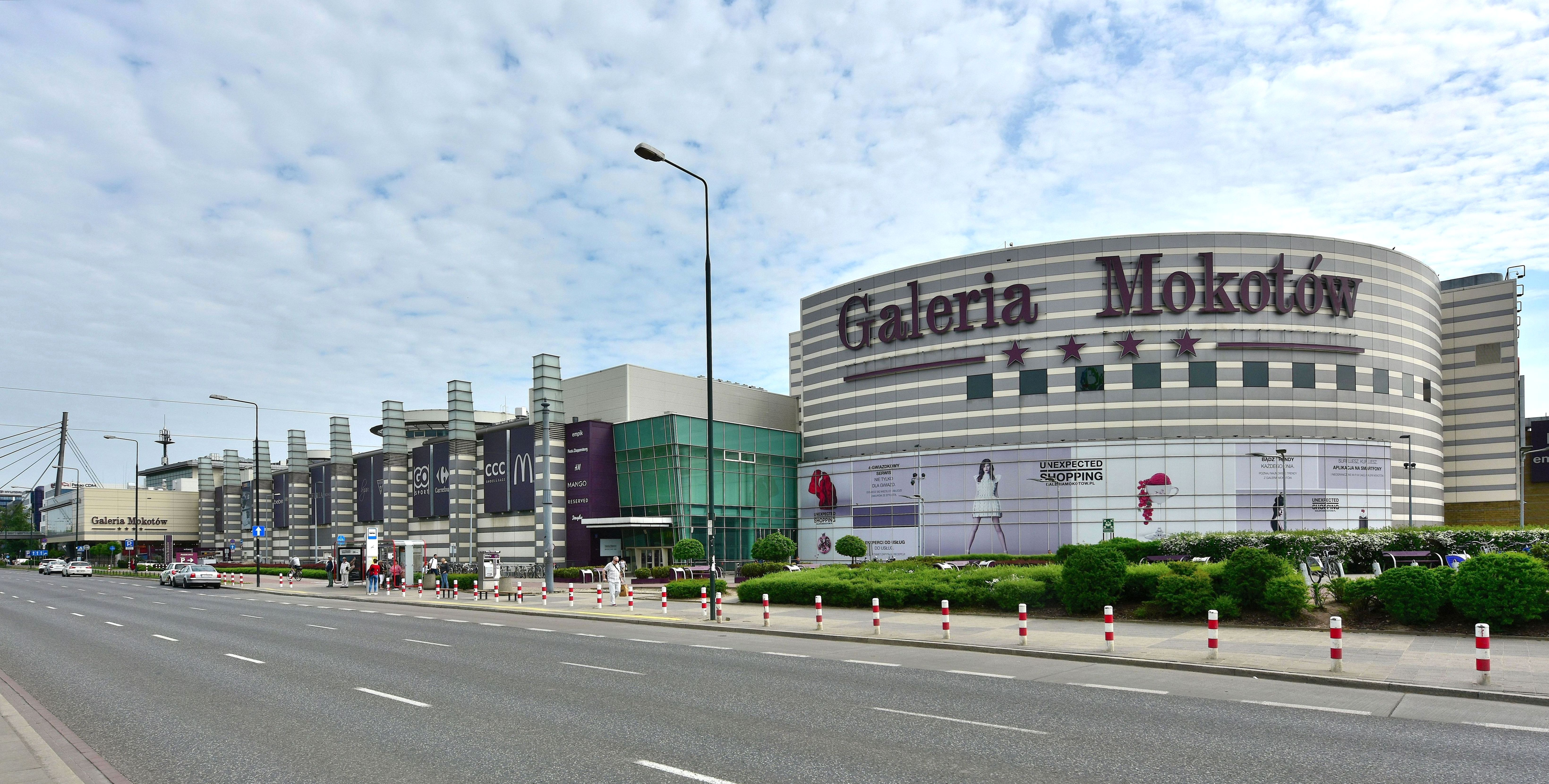
Westfield Mokotów (then known as Galeria Mokotów) in 2021.

The building was commissioned by Globe Trade Centre. The construction begun in 1998, in the Warsaw, Poland, in the district of Mokotów. The building had been opened to the public in September 2000, under the name Galeria Mokotów. In 2003, Rodamco Europe, had signed an agreement with GTC, in accordance to which, the company would manage the shopping centre, and receive half of its revenue. Since 2011, the shopping centre is owned by Unibail-Rodamco-Westfield.

The building underwent reconstruction in 2002 and 2006, which resulted in the expansion that added 62.5 000 m² of shopping area. It again underwent reconstruction in 2020.

On 29 September 2022, the building had been renamed to Westfield Mokotów. On that day, as part of the celebrations of the rebranding, on the roof of the building was held a concert of musician Jessie Ware.

== See also ==
- List of shopping malls in Poland
