= North Ursynów =

Neighbourhood in Warsaw, Poland

- City Information System area (neighbourhood)
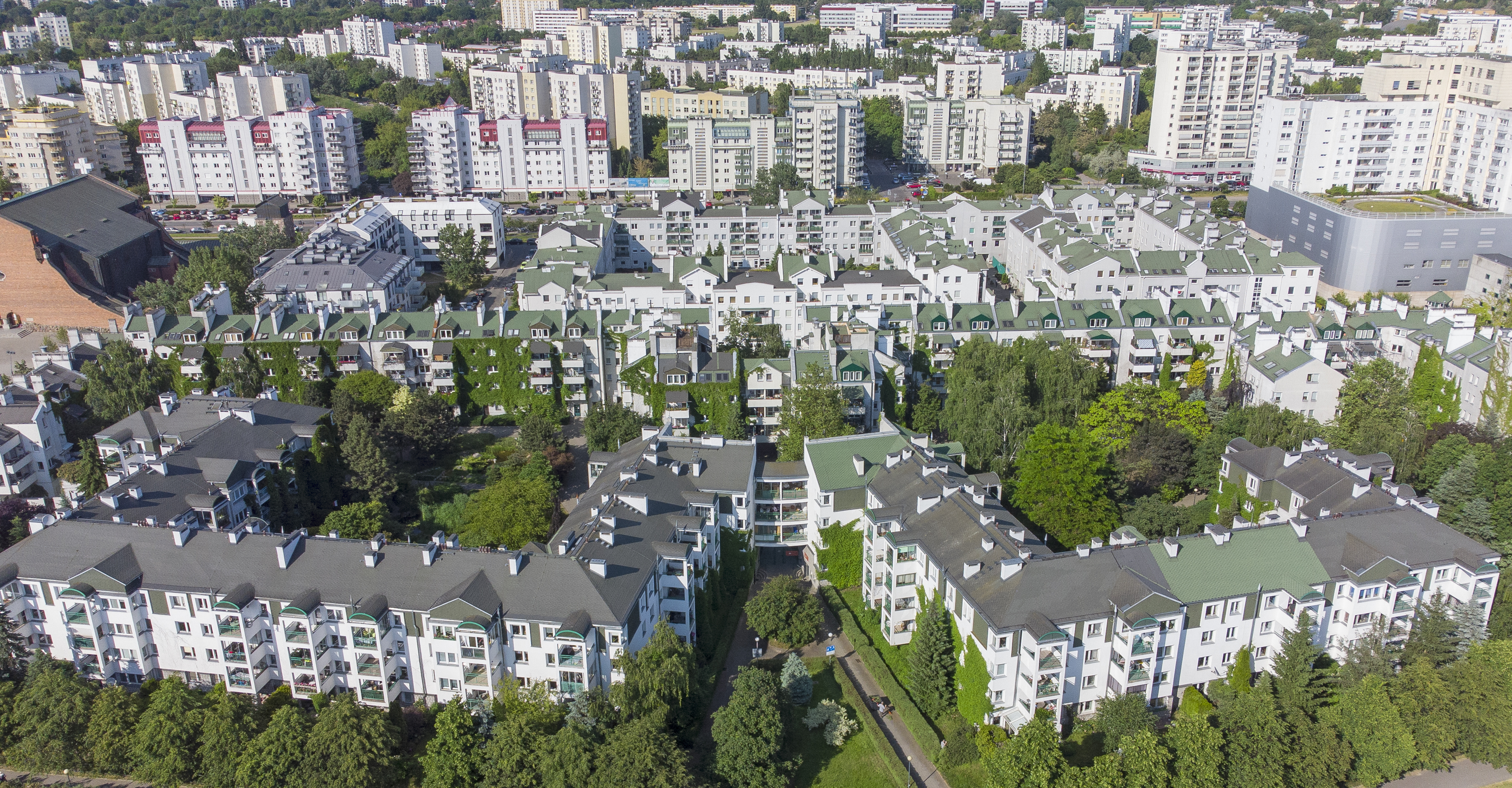
- The apartment buildings near Komisji Edukacji Narodowej Avenue.

- North Ursynów within the Ursynów district.
- Coordinates: 52°09′32″N 21°01′41″E
- Country: Poland
- Voivodeship: Masovian
- City and county: Warsaw
- District: Ursynów
- Time zone: UTC+1 (CET)
  - Summer (DST): UTC+2 (CEST)
- Area code: +48 22

North Ursynów (Polish: Ursynów Północny [urˈsɘ̟n.uf puwˈnɔt͡s.nɘ̟]) is a neighbourhood, and a City Information System area, in Warsaw, Poland, within the Ursynów district. Its a high-rise residential area with apartment buildings, predominantly dominated by two housing estates, Jary and Stokłosy. The neighbourhood also includes two urban parks, the John Paul II Park in the south, and Roman Kozłowski Park in the central north. Additionally, North Ursynów also fratures the Służewiec Racecourse, the Vistula University, and the Church of Ascension. The neighbourhood also has two stations of M1 line of the Warsaw Metro rapid transit underground system, including Ursynów, and Stokłosy.

By 1931, a hamlet of Imielin Nowy was present within the area. In 1939, Służewiec Racecourse was opened at Puławska Street, which at the time was the largest, and most modern horse racing venue in Europe. In 1977, the housing estates of Jary and Stokłosy were completed, and in 1995, the area was connected to the Warsaw Metro network.

== History ==
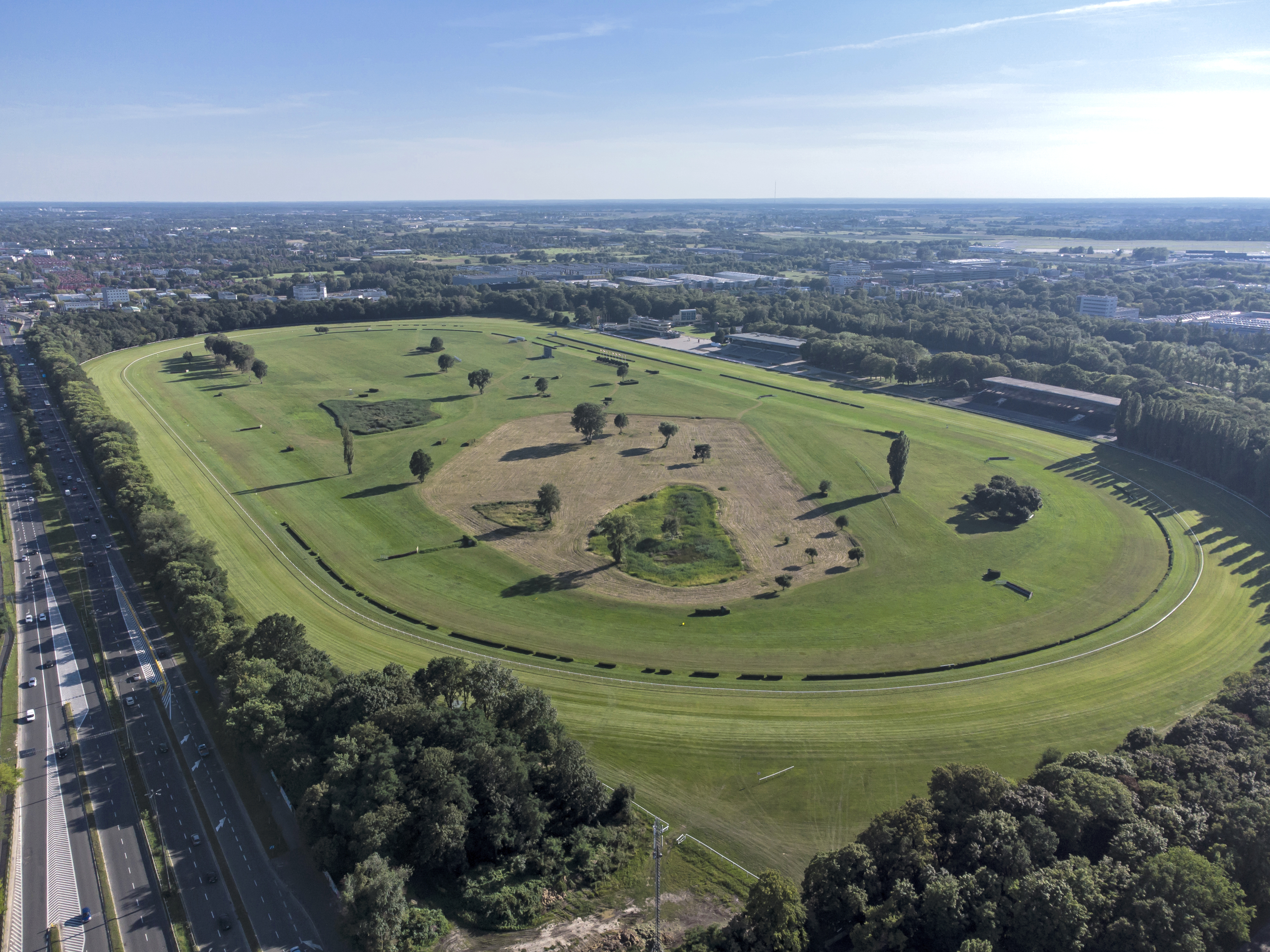
The Służewiec Racecourse, opened in 1939.

In 1903, the Służewiec narrow-gauge railway station was opened to the south-east of the village of Służewiec, near the current intersection of Puławska and Dolina Służewiecka Streets. It was operated by the Grójec Commuter Railway, as part of the line between stations Warszawa Mokotów and Nowe Miasto nad Pilicą. It was closed down in 1971.

Between 1925 and 1939, the Służewiec Racecourse was built at 266 Puławska Street, to the south of Służewiec. Upon its opening, it became the largest and most modern horse racing venue in Europe, with its main circuit measuring 2,300 m. It began hosting the Great Warsaw Race, the most prestigious horse race in Poland.

By 1931, the hamlet of Imielin Nowy was present at Puławska Street, near the Służewiec Racecourse.

On 27 September 1938, the village of Służewiec was incorporated into the city of Warsaw.

On 8 September 1939, the area, including the Służewiec Racecourse, was captured by the German Army during the siege of Warsaw in the Second World War. On 12 September, a group of soldiers from the 360th Infantry Regiment of the Polish Armed Forces, led by lieutenant colonel Jakub Chmura, together with two tank companies, attacked German positions in the nearby Okęcie. As part of the offensive, a portion of the soldiers, commanded by Czesław Chamerski, and supported by half of a tank battalion, recaptured the race track with light German resistance. From there, it headed towards the Fort VI "Okęcie", being pushed back by heavy fire from fortified German soldiers, eventually retreating at 11:00 am. The Polish side suffered around 80 dead and wounded soldiers, which was around of its 45% forces. Służewiec was completely destroyed in 1944 by the German officers, as part of the planned destruction of Warsaw. The only surviving historical structure is a small Roman Catholic shrine located at the Bokserska Street. While under the occupation, the Służewiec Racecourse served as an airstrip for the fighter aircraft of the German Air Force. In July 1944, between 600 and 800 German soldiers were stationed there. On 1 August 1944, on the first day of the Warsaw Uprising, Polish resistance participants from the Karpaty Battalion of the Baszta Regiment, carried out an unsuccessful attack on the airstrip, suffering heavy casualties. Later that day, in retaliation, the German forces organised an execution at the racecourse, killing captured partisans and a group of civilians, rounded up in the nearby Służew.

The area was incorporated into the city of Warsaw on 14 May 1951.

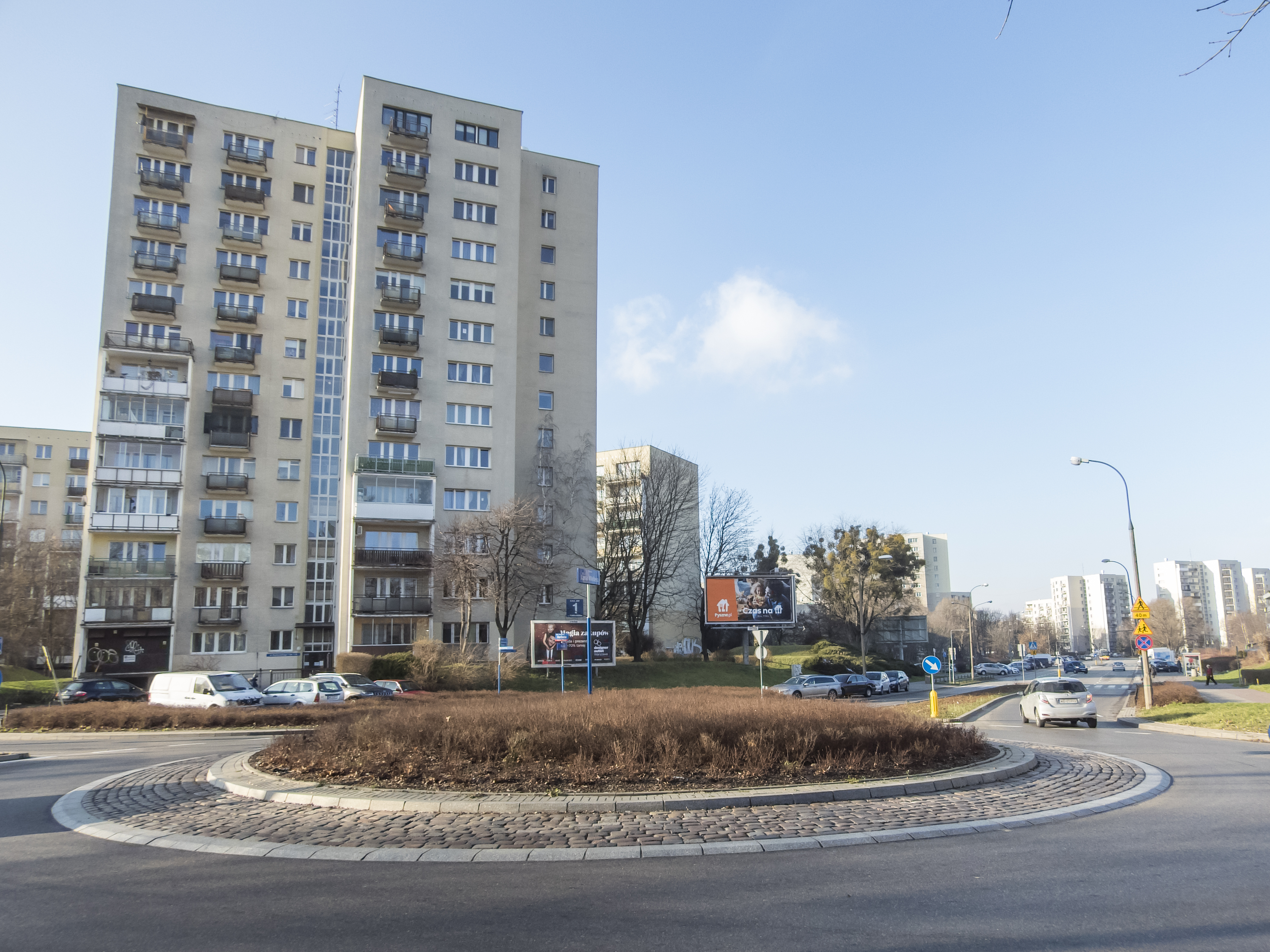
One of the apartment buildings in Jary built in the 1970s.

Between 1971 and 1977, the urban development area of North Ursynów, was constructed in an area encompassed between Dolina Służewiecka Street, Rodowicza Street, Ciszewskiego Street, Pileckiego Street, and Puławska Street. Having a total area of 126 ha, it consists of two housing estates separated by Komisji Edukacji Narodowej Avenue, with Jary in the west, and Stokłosy in the east. They predominantly consisted of 4- and 13-storey apartment buildings, constructed with the large panel system technique. They were designed to house around 39,300 in 9,580 apartments. The main architects responsible for the project were Marek Budzyński, Jerzy Szczepanik-Dzikowski, and Andrzej Szkop. Between 1971 and 1977, the housing estate of Koński Jar-Nutki was also built to the east of Jary, between Surowieckiego Street, Zaolziańska Street, Dolina Służewiecka Street, and Komisji Edukacji Narodowej Avenue, and centred on Koński Jar and Nutki Street. Additionally, in 1977, the Roman Kozłowski Park was also opened next to Jary. It included the Cwil Mound, a mound created in 1976 from the ground excavated during the construction of the neighbourhood.

In 1977, twelve sculptures, known as the Ursynów Sculptures, were placed across North Ursynów. They were made in various techniques by several, under the patronage of the Association of Polish Artists and Designers, by artists Edmund Majkowski, Janina Mirecka-Maciejewska, Marek Jerzy Moszyński, Ryszard Stryjecki, Władysław Trojan, and Stefan Wierzbicki.

Between 1982 and 1989, a Catholic temple, known as the Church of the Ascension, was built at 101 Komisji Edukacji Narodowej Avenue.

Between 1986 and 1996, the gated community of Surowieckiego 2, 4, 6, 8, consisting of eleven four-storey-tall apartment buildings, was constructed between Puławska, Zaorskiego, and Surowieckiego Streets. Between 1993 and 1999, the Neighbourhood of Techniczna Construction and Housing Association, consisting of eleven three-storey-tall apartment buildings, was also developed nearby between Zaolziańska, Zaorskiego, Puławsk, and Dolina Służewiecka Streets.

In 1990, the first IKEA store in Poland was opened at 8 Bacewiczówna Street. It operated until 1992, with company moving to other locations in the city.

In 1992, the Vistula University was opened at 3 Stokłosy Street, becoming one of the oldest, and one of the leading private universities in Poland.

In 1995, two stations of the M1 line of the Warsaw Metro rapid transit underground system were opened within the neighbourhood, including Ursynów at the intersection of Komisji Edukacji Narodowej Avenue, Surowieckiego Street, and Bartoka Street, and Stokłosy, at the intersection of Komisji Edukacji Narodowej Avenue, Jastrzębowskiego Street, and Herbsta Street.

In 1998, the Ursynów district was subdivided into the City Information System areas, with North Ursynów becoming one of them. It primary included the housing estates of Jary and Stokłosy, as well as the main circuit of the Służewiec Racecourse. In 2000, its boundaries were modified, with an area between Wyczółki Street, Puławska Street, Poleczki Street, and Galopu Street, being ceded to Grabów.

In 2000, the John Paul II Park was opened between Romera and Melodyjna Streets.

== Housing ==
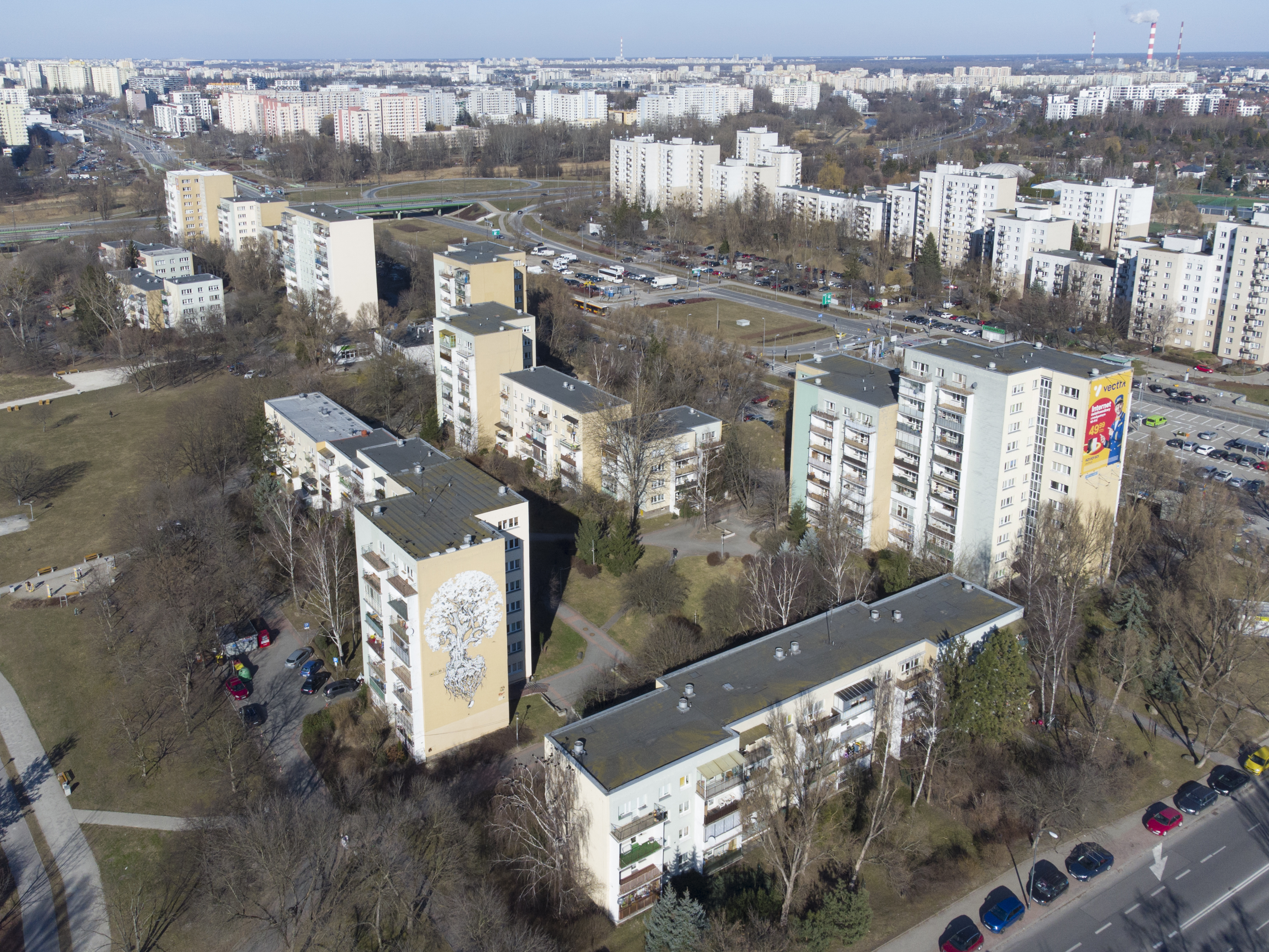
The apartment buildings in the housing estate of Koński Jar-Nutki.

North Ursynów is a residential area with high-rise apartment buildings. Its two main neighbourhoods are Stokłosy in the east, Dolina Służewiecka Street, Rodowicza Street, Ciszewskiego Street, and Komisji Edukacji Narodowej Avenue, and Jary in the centre, between Dolina Służewiecka Street, Komisji Edukacji Narodowej Avenue, Ciszewskiego Street, Pileckiego Street, and Puławska Street. Both predominantly consist of 4- and 13-storey apartment buildings, constructed in the large panel system technique in the 1970s. Additionally, the housing estate of Koński Jar-Nutki, is placed in the central-north portion between Surowieckiego Street, Zaolziańska Street, Dolina Służewiecka Street, and Komisji Edukacji Narodowej Avenue, and centred on Koński Jar Street and Nutki Street.

Furthermore, the area also has two gated community, including Neighbourhood of Techniczna Construction and Housing Association, between Zaolziańska, Zaorskiego, Puławsk, and Dolina Służewiecka Streets, with eleven three-storey-tall apartment buildings, and Surowieckiego 2, 4, 6, 8, between Puławska, Jana Zaorskiego, and Surowieckiego Streets, with four four-storey-tall apartment buildings.

== Parks and recreation ==
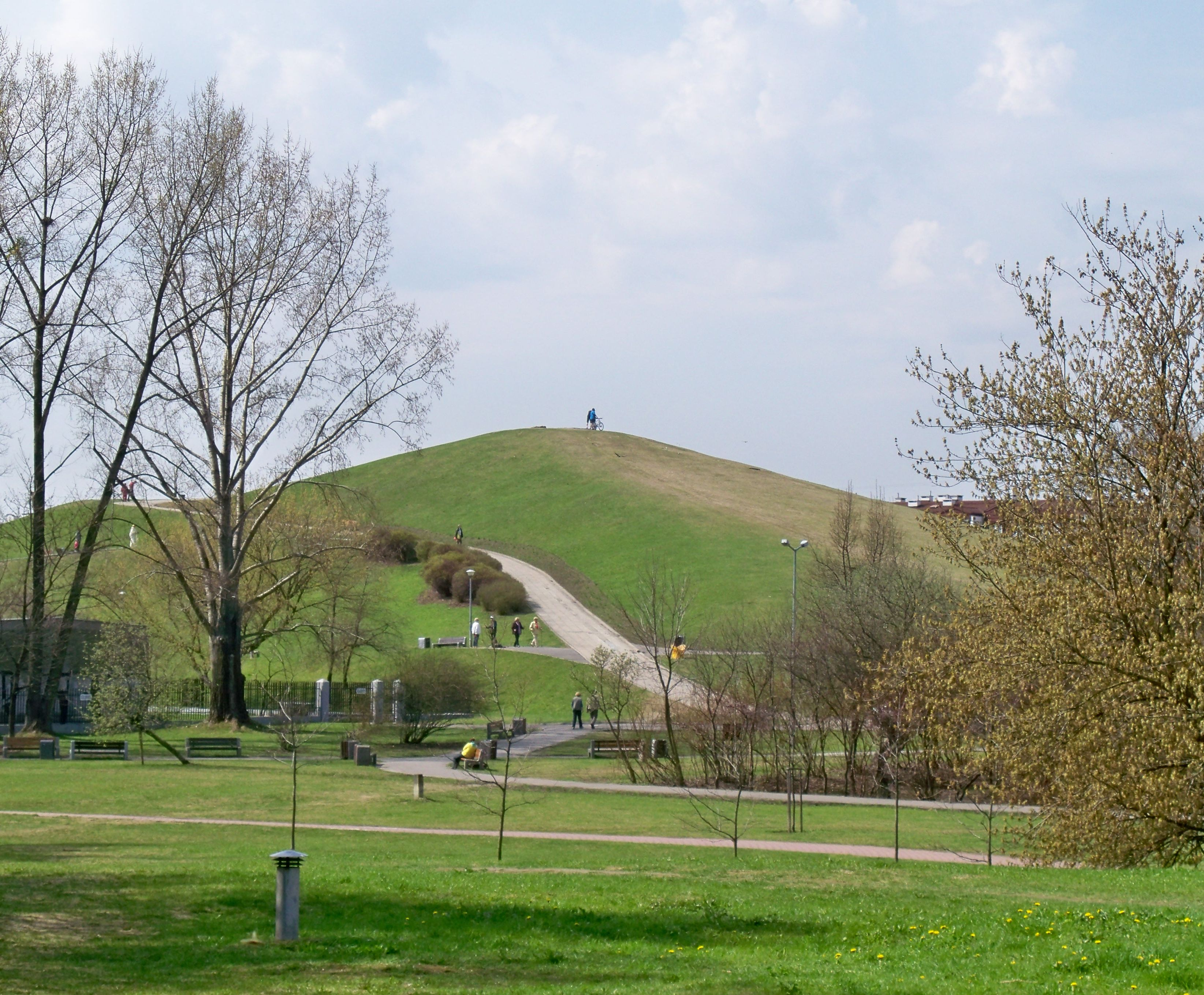
The Cwil Mound in the Roman Kozłowski Park.

North Ursynów features two urban parks, including the Roman Kozłowski Park in the central north, between Nutki, Zaolziańska, Dolina Służewiecka, and Rzymowskiego Streets, and the John Paul II Park in the south, between Romera and Melodyjna Streets. Kozłowski Park also features the Cwil Mound, a mound created in the 1970s.

The neighbourhood also features the Służewiec Racecourse at 266 Puławska Street, with two race circuits, a primary turf track with the length of 2,300 m (1.4 miles) and a secondary dirt track with the length of 1,930 m (1.2 miles). Every year, the venue hosts the Great Warsaw Race, the most prestigious horse race in Poland.

A series of twelve sculptures, known as the Ursynów Sculptures, are placed across the neighbourhood, representing various art techniques. They were created in 1977 under the patronage of the Association of Polish Artists and Designers, by artists Edmund Majkowski, Janina Mirecka-Maciejewska, Marek Jerzy Moszyński, Ryszard Stryjecki, Władysław Trojan, and Stefan Wierzbicki.

== Nature ==
The premises of the Służewiec Racecourse at 266 Puławska Street, include two small ponds, known as the Wyścigi Ponds, with areas of 0.4 i 0.21 ha. The Służewiec Stream flows along the neighbourhoos northwestern boundary. It passes through the Wyścigi Pond, which has an area of 1.917 ha, and is placed at the neighbourhood border near Wyścigowa Avenue.

North Ursynów also has several natural monuments, including two white poplar trees, and six glacial erratic rocks. This includes the Ursynów Boulder (Polish: Głaz Ursynowski) in the Roman Kozłowski Park, which, with the height of 2.62 m, and circumference of 11.1 m, is the largest glacial erratic rock in the city.

== Higher education ==
The neighbourhood includes the Vistula University, located at 3 Stokłosy Street, which is one of the leading private universities in Poland.

== Public transit ==
North Ursynów has two stations of the M1 line of the Warsaw Metro rapid transit underground system. Thus includes Ursynów at the intersection of Komisji Edukacji Narodowej Avenue, Surowieckiego Street, and Bartoka Street, and Stokłosy, at the intersection of Komisji Edukacji Narodowej Avenue, Jastrzębowskiego Street, and Herbsta Street.

== Religion ==
The neighbourhood includes the Church of the Ascension, located at 101 Komisji Edukacji Narodowej Avenue, which belongs to the Catholic denomination.

== Location and boundaries ==
North Ursynów is a City Information System area located in Warsaw, within the north-central portion of Ursynów district. To the north, its border is determined by Wyścigowa Avenue, Dolina Służewiecka Street, and around the intersection of Dolina Służewiecka Street and Komisji Edukacji Narodowej Avenue; the east, by Rodowicza Street, and around buildings at Chłapowskiego Street; to the south, by Ciszewskiego Street, and Pileckiego Street; and to the west, by Puławska Street, around the building at 270 Puławska Street, Wyczółki Street, around the boundary of the main circuit of the Służewiec Racecourse, the eastern shore of Wyścigi Pond, and Służewiec Stream.

It borders Służew to the north, Stary Służew to the northeast, Ursynów-Centrum to the southeast, Grabów, and Stary Imielin to the southwest, and Wyczółki, Warsaw, to the west. Its northern boundary forms the border of the districts of Ursynów and Mokotów.
