= Jary, Warsaw =

Neighbourhood in Warsaw, Poland

Jary
- Neighbourhood
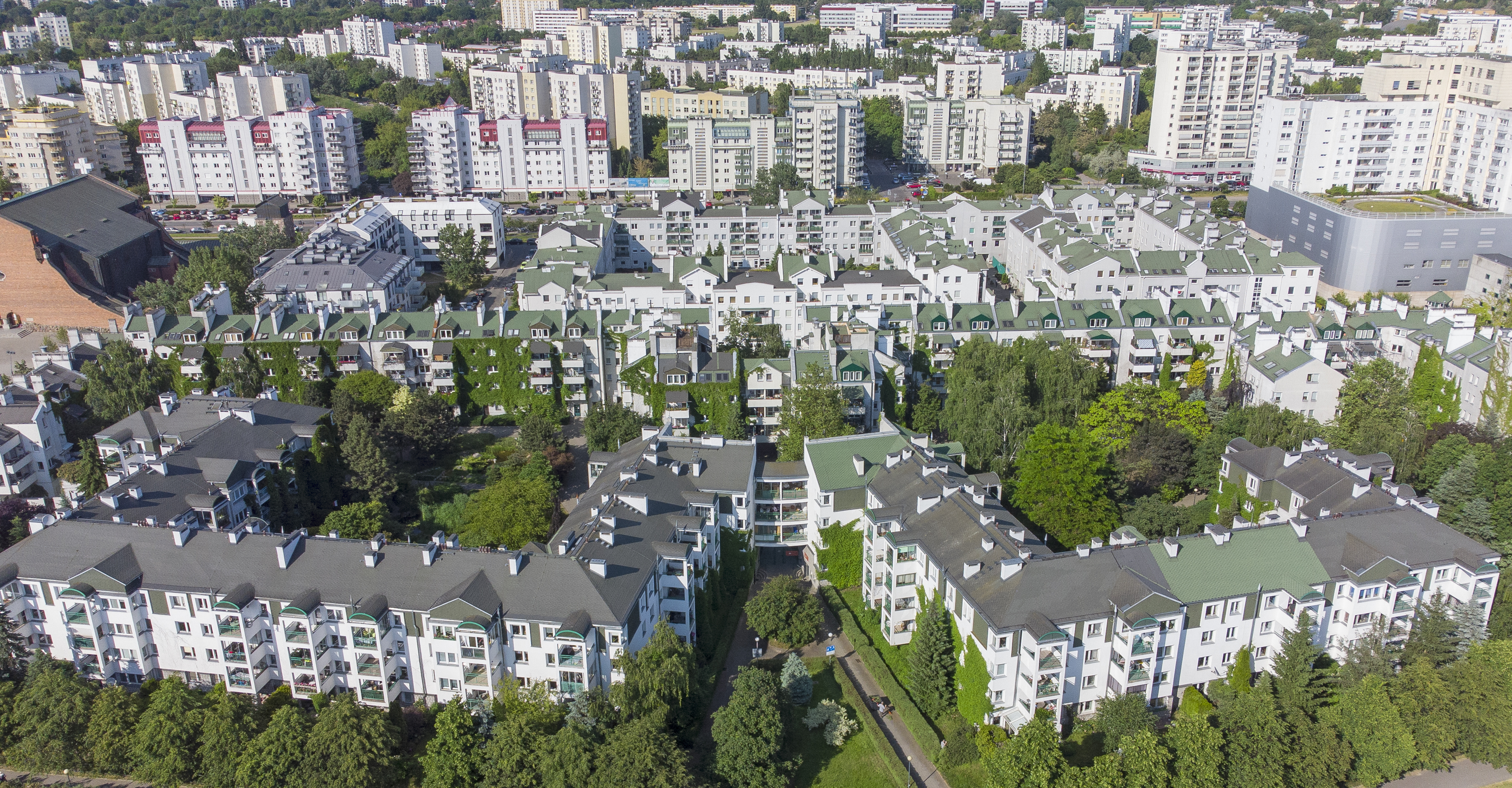
- The multifamily residential housing in the region of Komisji Edukacji Narodowej Avenue, in Jary, in 2023.
- Interactive map of Jary
- Coordinates: 52°09′32″N 21°01′28″E
- Country: Poland
- Voivodeship: Masovian
- City and county: Warsaw
- District: Ursynów
- City Information System area: North Ursynów
- Time zone: UTC+1 (CET)
  - Summer (DST): UTC+2 (CEST)
- Area code: +48 22

Jary (Polish: [ˈja.rɘ̟]) is a neighbourhood in Warsaw, Poland, located within the district of Ursynów, in the City Information System of North Ursynów.

The area was incorporated into the city of Warsaw in 1951. Jary was constructed between 1971 and 1977, together with Stokłosy, as neighbourhoods of the North Ursynów residential area. Within the boundaries of Jary were also constructed a few smaller neighbourhoods. They were: Koński Jar-Nutki between 1971 and 1977, Surowieckiego 2, 4, 6, 8 between 1986 and 1996, and the Neighbourhood of Techniczna Construction and Housing Association between 1993 and 1999.

Jary mostly consists of highrise multifamily housing. There are located two urban parks, the John Paul II Park, and Roman Kozłowski Park. Additionally, there are two stations the Warsaw Metro rapid transit underground system, which are, the Ursynów station, and the Stokłosy station.

== History ==
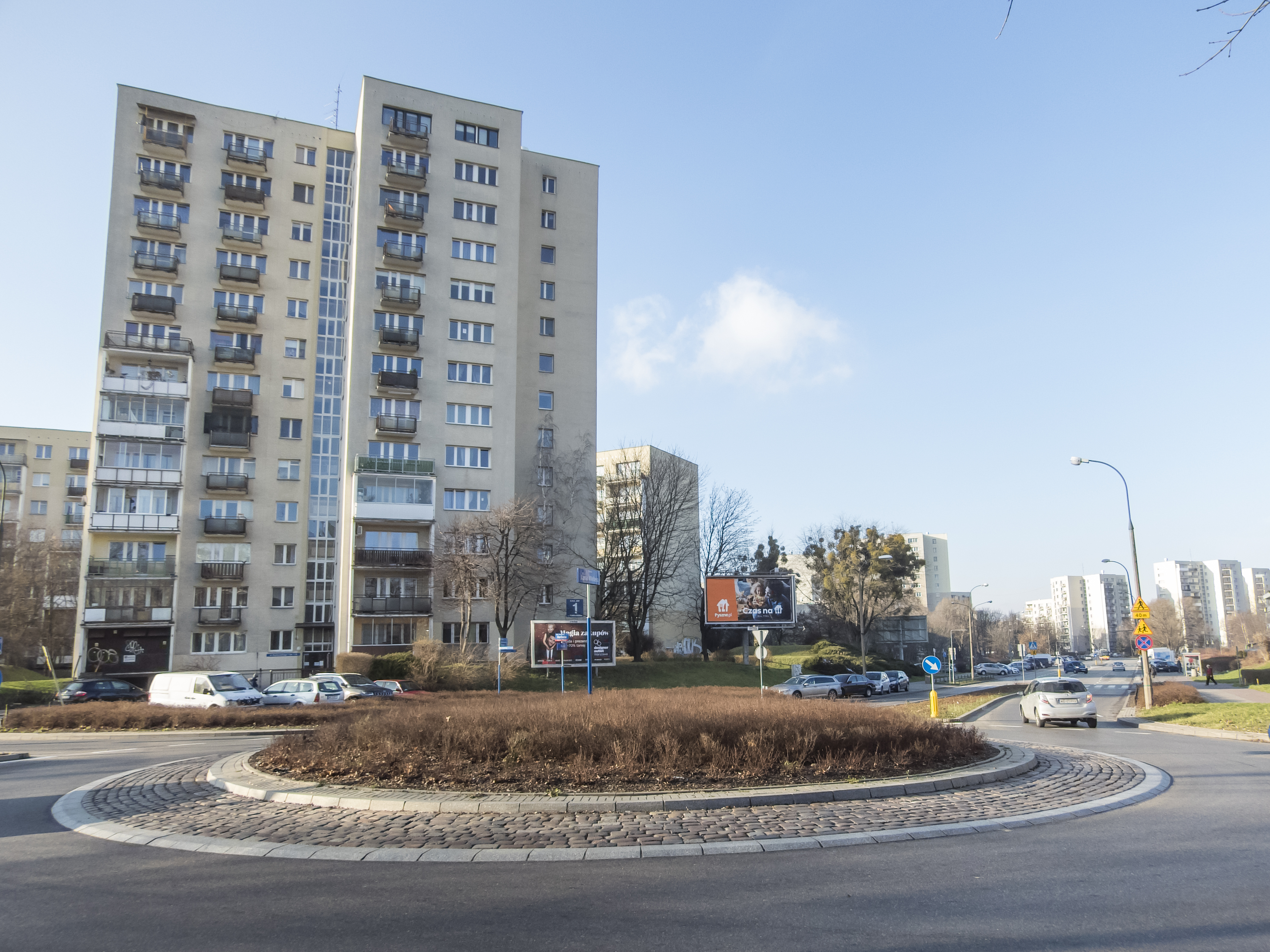
The building at 1 Dunikowskiego Street, an example of multifamily highrise housing constructed in Jary in the 1970s.

By the 1930s, within the modern boundaries of Jary was located the hamlet of Imielin Nowy, placed to the north from the village of Imielin.

On 14 May 1951 the area was incorporated into the city of Warsaw.

Jary was constructed between 1971 and 1977, together with Stokłosy, as neighbourhoods of the residential area of North Ursynów. It was built between Dolina Służewiecka Street, Komisji Edukacji Narodowej Avenue, Ciszewskiego Street, Pileckiego Street, and Puławska Street, to the west from Stokłosy. In it were constructed 4- and 13-storey multifamily residential large panel system buildings, and prefabricated reinforced concrete service buildings. The main architects responsible for the project were Marek Budzyński, Jerzy Szczepanik-Dzikowski, and Andrzej Szkop. Between 1971 and 1977, within the boundaries of Jary was also constructed the neighbourhood of Koński Jar-Nutki with multifamily residential large panel system buildings, located between Surowieckiego Street, Zaolziańska Street, Dolina Służewiecka Street, and Komisji Edukacji Narodowej Avenue, and centred on Koński Jar Street and Nutki Street. In 1977 next to it was also opened the Roman Kozłowski Park. It includes the Cwil Mound, an artificial mound formed in 1976 from the ground excavated during the construction in North Ursynów. In 1977, across North Ursynów, including Jary and Koński Jar-Nutki were placed series of twelve sculptures made in various techniques, known as the Ursynów Sculptures. They were made under the patronage of the Association of Polish Artists and Designers, by artists Edmund Majkowski, Janina Mirecka-Maciejewska, Marek Jerzy Moszyński, Ryszard Stryjecki, Władysław Trojan, and Stefan Wierzbicki.

Between 1982 and 1989, at 101 Komisji Edukacji Narodowej Avenue was built the Christian Church of the Ascension.

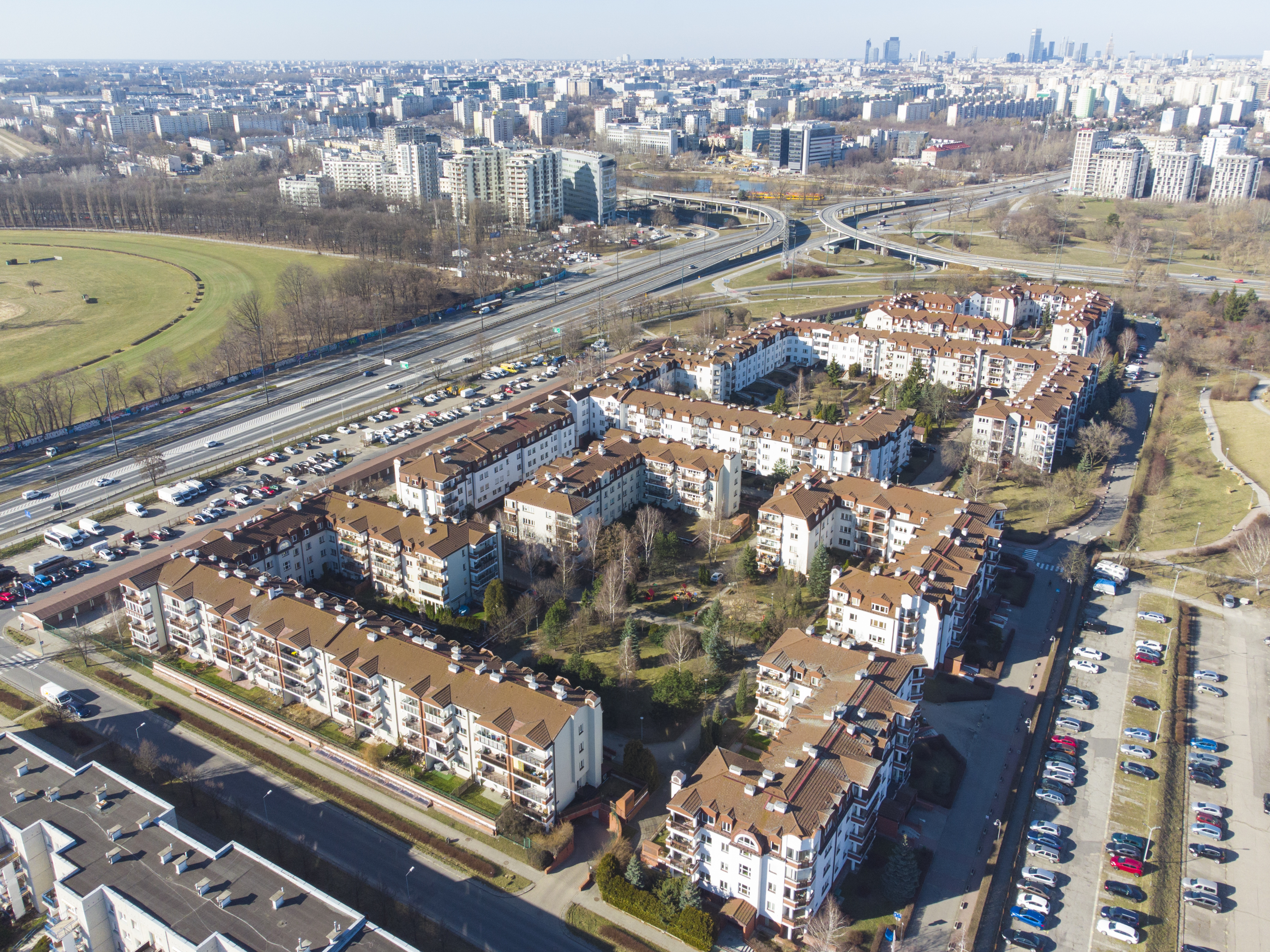
The Neighbourhood of Techniczna Construction and Housing Association in Jary, constructed between 1993 and 1999. Photography made in 2022.

Between 1986 and 1996, within the boundaries of Jary, was constructed the gated community of Surowieckiego 2, 4, 6, 8, located between Puławska Street, Jana Zaorskiego Street, and Surowieckiego Street. It consists of four four-storey-tall multifamily residential buildings. It was designed by architects Adam Kowalewski, Jerzy Szczepanik-Dzikowski, Olgierd Jagiełło, and Maciej Miłobędzki. Nearby, between 1993 and 1999, was constructed the gated community of the Neighbourhood of Techniczna Construction and Housing Association, located between Zaolziańska Street, Zaorskiego Street, Puławsk Street, and Dolina Służewiecka Street. It consists of eleven three-storey-tall multifamily residential buildings.

On 7 April 1995, in Jary were opened two stations of the M1 line of the Warsaw Metro rapid transit underground system. They are Ursynów station, located at the intersection of Komisji Edukacji Narodowej Avenue, Surowieckiego Street, and Bartoka Street, and Stokłosy station, at the intersection of Komisji Edukacji Narodowej Avenue, Jastrzębowskiego Street, and Herbsta Street.

In 1998, the city district of Ursynów was subdivided into the areas of the City Information System, with Jary becoming part of North Ursynów.

On 18 May 2000 was opened the John Paul II Park, located between Romera Street and Melodyjna Street. It was constructed between 1999 and 2000, and designed by Dorota Sikora.

== Characteristics ==
=== Housing ===
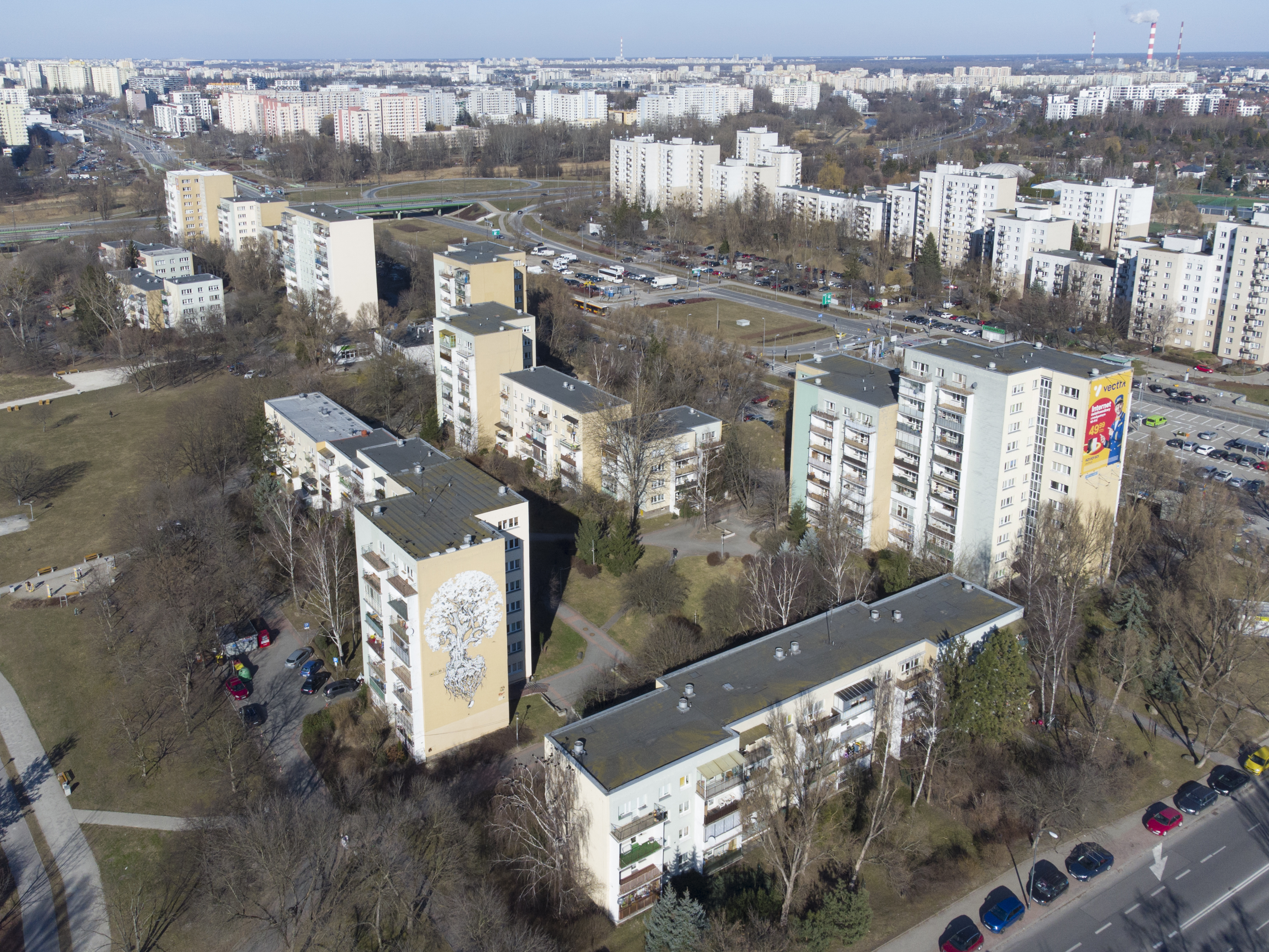
The multifamily residential housing in the neighbourhood of Koński Jar-Nutki, within Jary, in 2022.

North Ursynów mostly consists of the residential areas with multifamily residential buildings. The neighbourhood of Jary mostly consists of the residential area with highrise multifamily housing.

Within the boundaries of Jary are also located a few smaller neighbourhoods. In its northeastern portion, is located the Koński Jar-Nutki, which consists of multifamily residential buildings. It is located between Surowieckiego Street, Zaolziańska Street, Dolina Służewiecka Street, and Komisji Edukacji Narodowej Avenue, and centred on Koński Jar Street and Nutki Street. To the south, is the gated community of the Neighbourhood of Techniczna Construction and Housing Association, which consists of eleven three-storey-tall multifamily residential buildings. It is located between Zaolziańska Street, Zaorskiego Street, Puławsk Street, and Dolina Służewiecka Street. Further south is the gated community of Surowieckiego 2, 4, 6, 8, which consists of four four-storey-tall multifamily residential buildings. It is located between Puławska Street, Jana Zaorskiego Street, and Surowieckiego Street.

=== Public spaces ===
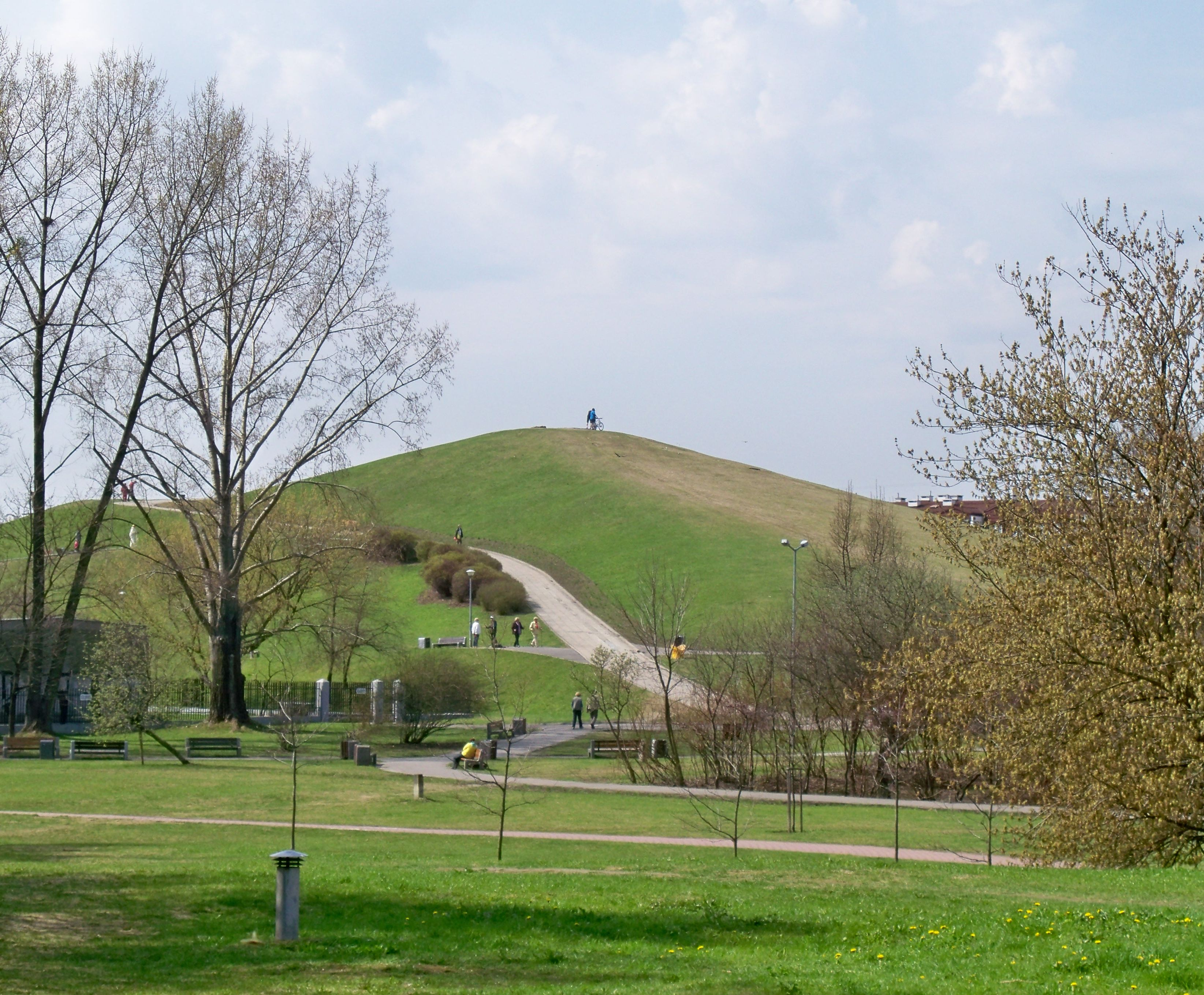
The Cwil Mound in the Roman Kozłowski Park in 2012.

In Jary are located two urban parks. In its northcentral portion is the Roman Kozłowski Park, located between Koński Jar Street, Nutki Street, Zaolziańska Street, Dolina Służewiecka Street, and Rzymowskiego Street. Within its boundaries is located the Cwil Mound, an artificial mound constructed in the 1970s. To the south, at Romera Street and Melodyjna Street is located the John Paul II Park.

=== Public transit ===
In Jary are located two stations of the M1 line of the Warsaw Metro rapid transit underground system. They are Ursynów station, located at the intersection of Komisji Edukacji Narodowej Avenue, Surowieckiego Street, and Bartoka Street, and Stokłosy station, at the intersection of Komisji Edukacji Narodowej Avenue, Jastrzębowskiego Street, and Herbsta Street.

=== Religion ===
Within North Ursynów, at 101 Komisji Edukacji Narodowej Avenue is located the Christian Church of the Ascension.

== Boundaries ==
Stokłosy is located within the district of Ursynów in the city of Warsaw, Poland. It is part of the City Information System area of North Ursynów. To the north, its border is determined by Dolina Służewiecka Street; to the east, by Komisji Edukacji Narodowej Avenue; to the south, by Ciszewskiego Street, and Pileckiego Street; and to the west, by Puławska Street.
