= Stokłosy =

Neighbourhood in Warsaw, Poland

- Neighbourhood
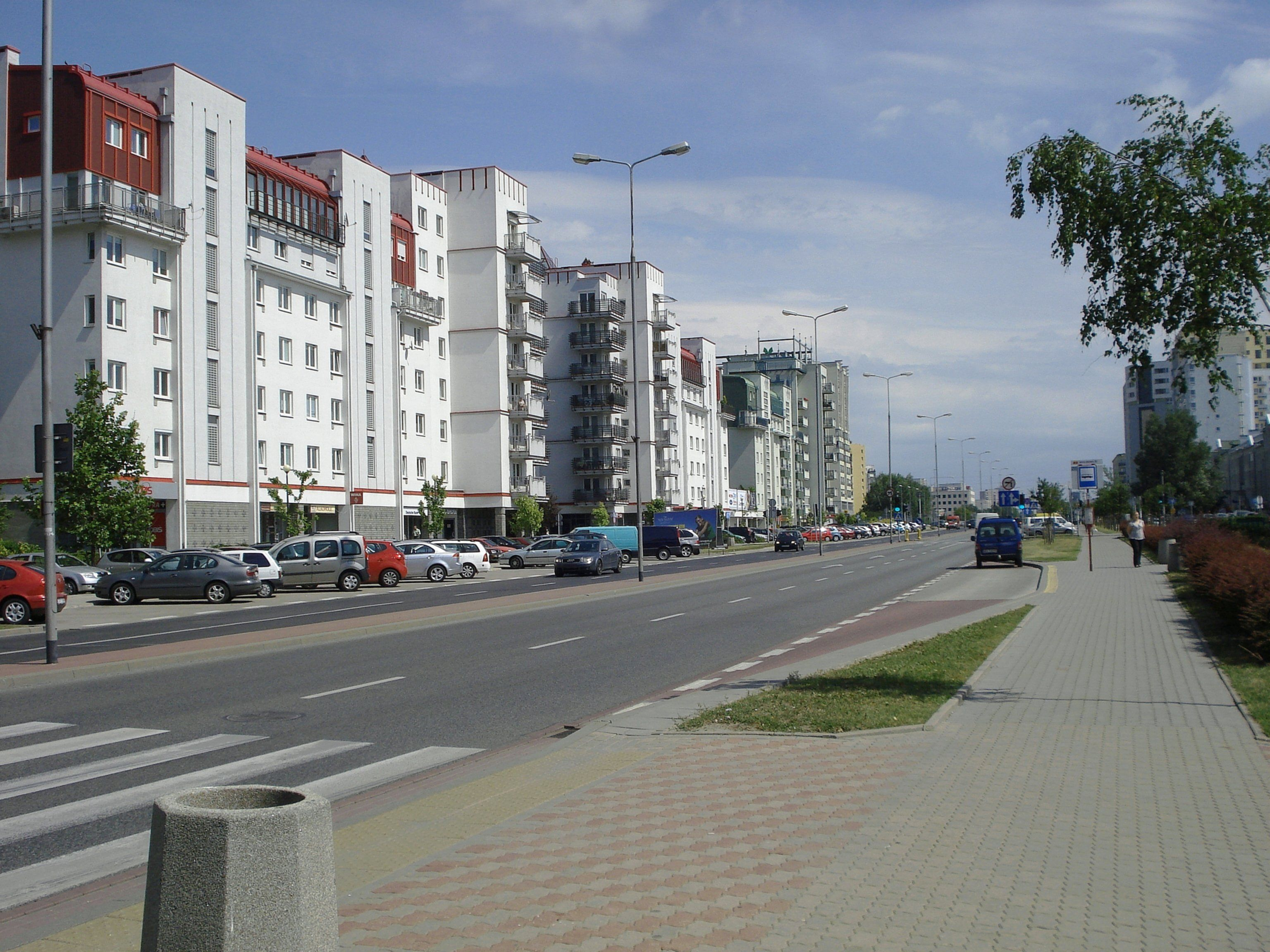
- The multifamily residential buildings at Komisji Edukacji Narodowej Avenue, in Stokłosy, in 2011.
- Interactive map of Stokłosy
- Coordinates: 52°09′32″N 21°02′04″E
- Country: Poland
- Voivodeship: Masovian
- City and county: Warsaw
- District: Ursynów
- City Information System area: North Ursynów
- Time zone: UTC+1 (CET)
  - Summer (DST): UTC+2 (CEST)
- Area code: +48 22

Stokłosy (Polish: [stɔˈkwɔ.sɘ̟]) is a neighbourhood in Warsaw, Poland, located within the district of Ursynów, in the City Information System area of North Ursynów. It is a residential area, consisting of the highrise multifamily housing.

It was constructed in 1977, together with Jary, as the neighbourhoods of the North Ursynów residential area. In 1992, there was opened the Vistula University, which is one of the oldest, and one of the leading private universities in Poland. In 1995, in Stokłosy were opened two stations of the M1 line of the Warsaw Metro rapid transit underground system, which are Ursynów, and Stokłosy.

== History ==
On 14 May 1951 the area of modern Stokłosy was incorporated into the city of Warsaw.

Stokłosy was constructed between 1971 and 1977, together with Jary, as neighbourhoods of the residential area of North Ursynów. It was built between Dolina Służewiecka Street, Rodowicza Street, Ciszewskiego Street, Pileckiego Street, and Komisji Edukacji Narodowej Avenue, and located to the east from Jary. In it were constructed 4- and 13-storey multifamily residential large panel system buildings, and prefabricated reinforced concrete service buildings. The main architects responsible for the project were Marek Budzyński, Jerzy Szczepanik-Dzikowski, and Andrzej Szkop.

On 19 September 1990, at 8 Bacewiczówna Street, was opened the first IKEA store in Poland. It operated until 1992, with company moving to other locations in the city.

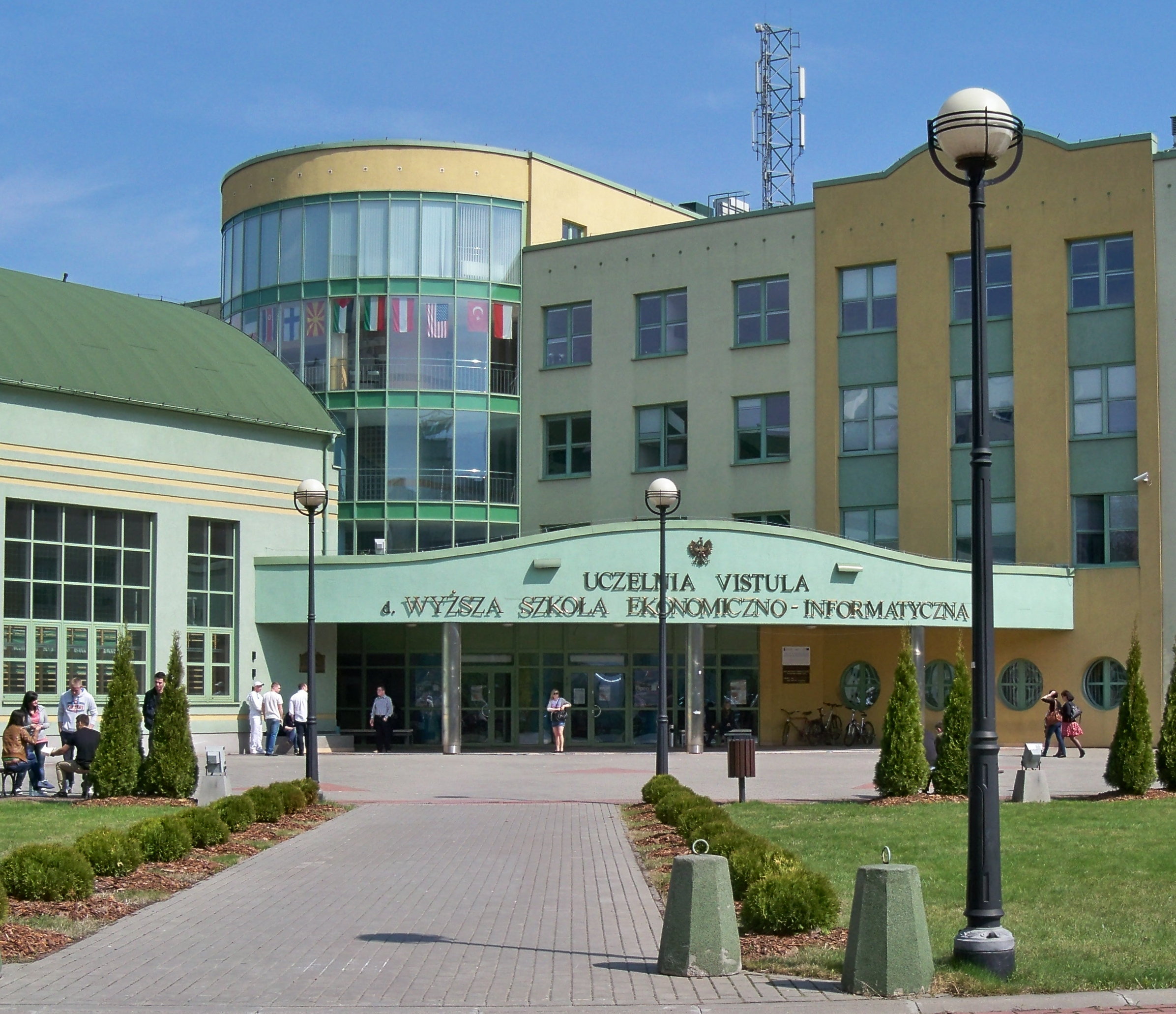
The Vistula University located at 3 Stokłosy Street, which was opened in 1992. Photography made in 2012.

In 1992, at 3 Stokłosy Street, was opened the Vistula University, one of the oldest, and one of the leading private universities in Poland.

On 7 April 1995, in Stokłosy were opened two stations of the M1 line of the Warsaw Metro rapid transit underground system. They are Ursynów station, located at the intersection of Komisji Edukacji Narodowej Avenue, Surowieckiego Street, and Bartoka Street, and Stokłosy station, at the intersection of Komisji Edukacji Narodowej Avenue, Jastrzębowskiego Street, and Herbsta Street.

In 1998, the district of Ursynów was subdivided into the areas of the City Information System, with Stokłosy becoming part of North Ursynów.

== Characteristics ==
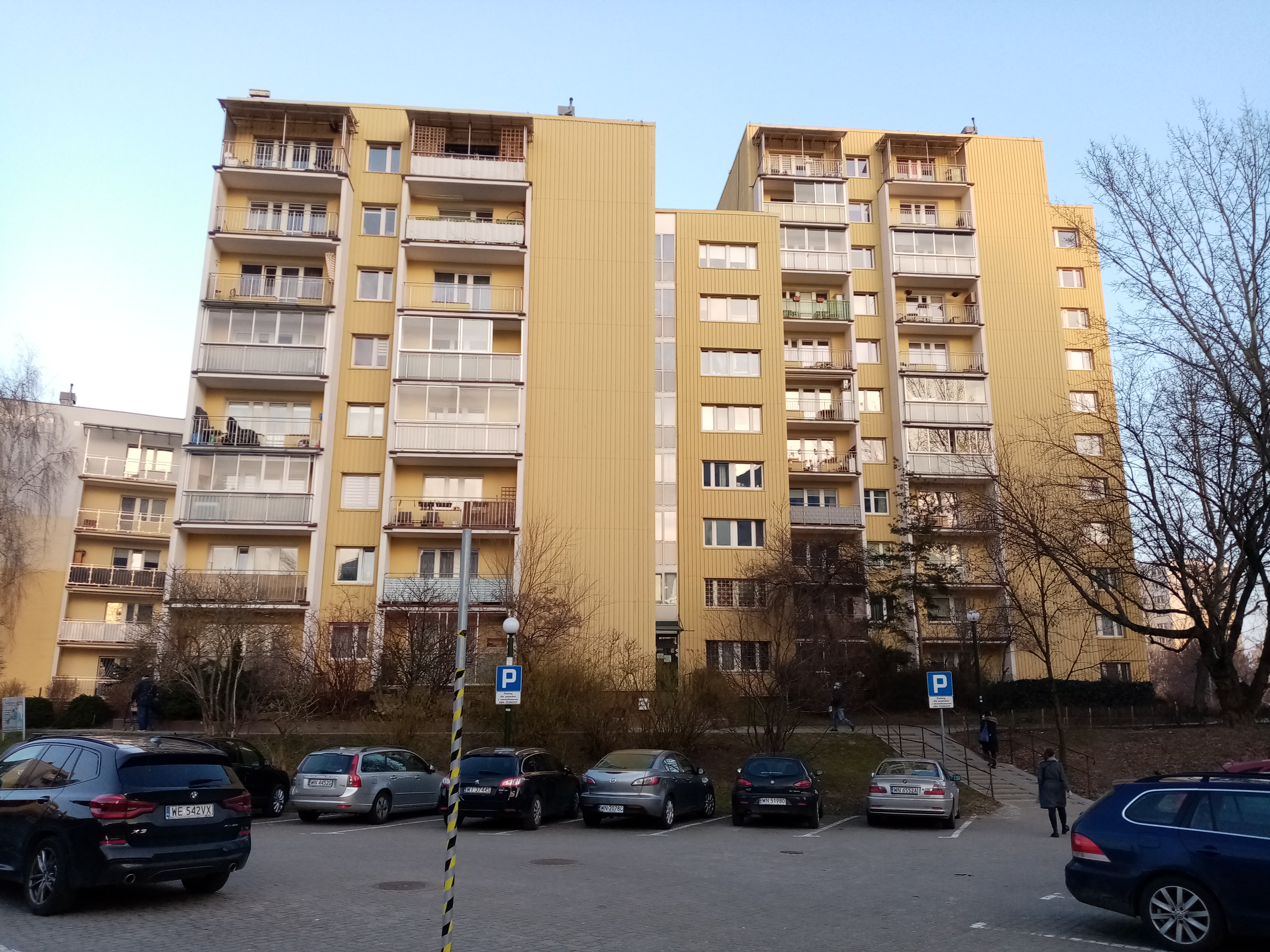
The building at 7 Bacewiczówny Street, an example of highrise multifamily housing in Stokłosy.

Stokłosy mostly consists of the residential area with highrise multifamily housing.

There are located two stations of the M1 line of the Warsaw Metro rapid transit underground system. They are Ursynów station, located at the intersection of Komisji Edukacji Narodowej Avenue, Surowieckiego Street, and Bartoka Street, and Stokłosy station, at the intersection of Komisji Edukacji Narodowej Avenue, Jastrzębowskiego Street, and Herbsta Street.

At 3 Stokłosy Street, is also located the Vistula University, which is one the leading private universities in Poland.

== Boundaries ==
Stokłosy is located within the district of Ursynów in the city of Warsaw, Poland. It is part of the City Information System area of North Ursynów. To the north, its border is determined by Dolina Służewiecka Street; to the east, by Rodowicza Street; to the south, by Ciszewskiego Street; and to the west, by Komisji Edukacji Narodowej Avenue.
