= Tadeusz Bartoś =

Polish philosopher (born 1967)

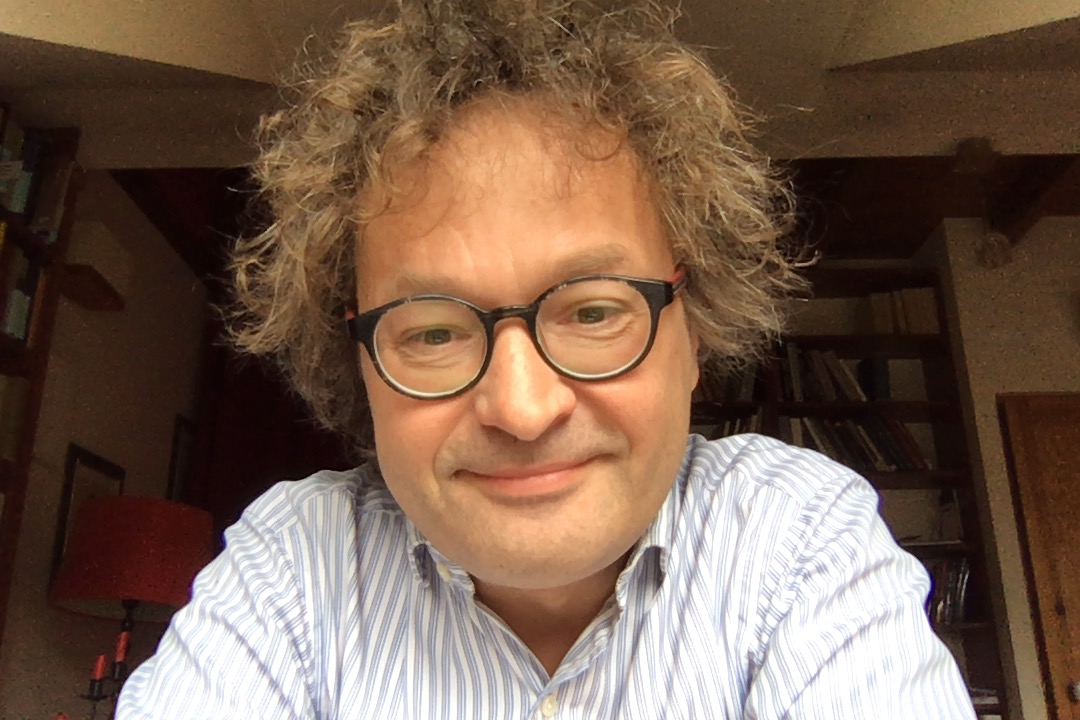
- Tadeusz Bartoś, 2019
- Born: 1967 (age 58–59); Krotoszyn
- Occupation: Philosopher
- Website: tadeuszbartos.pl

Tadeusz Bartoś (born 1967) is a philosopher, journalist, writer and academic teacher.

== Biography ==
From 1987 to 1993 he studied philosophy and theology at the Dominican College of Philosophy and Theology in Kraków. In 1993 he graduated with a master's degree from the Pontifical Academy of Theology in Kraków. In 1998 he obtained doctorate at the University of Warsaw upon dissertation Tomasza z Akwinu teoria miłości. Studium nad komentarzem do księgi "O imionach Bożych" Pseudo Dionizego Areopagity supervised by Mieczysław Boczar. In 2007 he obtained habilitation.

== Career ==
From 2007 to 2019 he taught at the Pułtusk Academy of Humanities. From 2019 to 2024 he taught at the Vistula University. From 2024 he has been employed as professor at the Kraków University of Econonics.

== Books ==
=== Monographs ===
- Tomasza z Akwinu teoria miłości. Studium nad Komentarzem do księgi „O imionach Bożych” Pseudo-Dionizego Areopagity. Kraków. 2004. ISBN 83-89598-27-2.
- Metafizyczny pejzaż. Świat według Tomasza z Akwinu. Kraków. 2006. ISBN 83-89598-93-0.
- Wolność, równość, katolicyzm. Warszawa. 2007. ISBN 978-83-7414-339-4.
- Jan Paweł II. Analiza krytyczna. Warszawa. 2008. ISBN 978-83-60457-46-7.
- Koniec prawdy absolutnej. Tomasz z Akwinu w epoce późnej nowoczesności. Warszawa. 2010. ISBN 978-83-7414-808-5.

=== Translations into Polish ===
- Thomas Aquinas (2002). Komentarz do Ewangelii Jana. Kęty. ISBN 83-88524-20-8.

=== Fiction ===
- Mnich. 2019. A novel.

=== Non-fiction ===
- Bóg odszedł z poczuciem winy. 2025. Autobiography.
