= Wilanowska metro station =

Warsaw metro station

Wilanowska
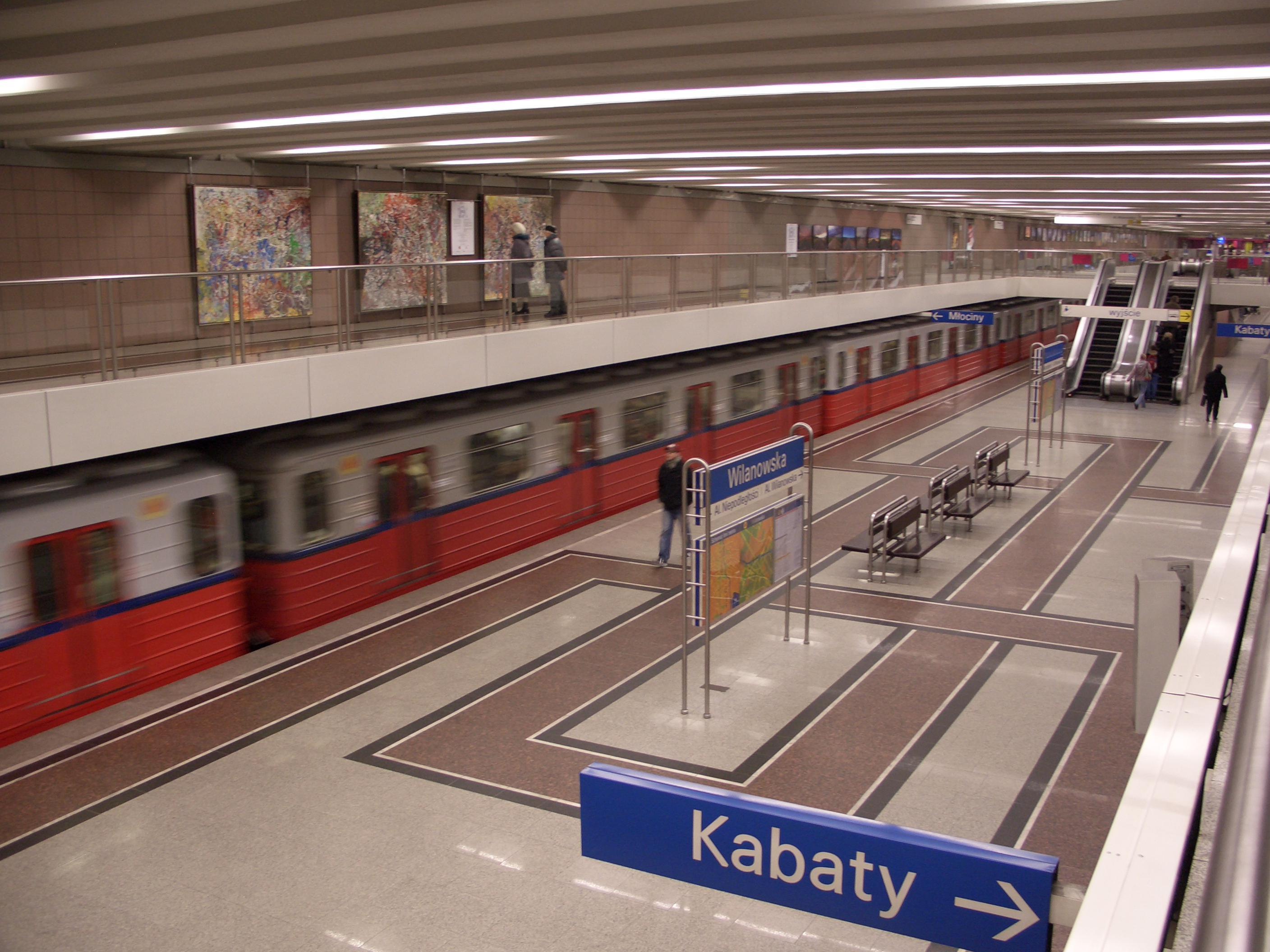

General information
- Coordinates: 52°10′53″N 21°1′23″E
- Owner: Public Transport Authority
- Platforms: 1 island platform
- Tracks: 2
- Connections: 107, 108, 130, 163, 164, 165, 217, 218, 251, 300, 331, 519, 709, 727, 739; N37, N50; 4, 10

Construction
- Structure type: Underground
- Platform levels: 1
- Accessible: Yes

Other information
- Station code: A-7
- Fare zone: 1

History
- Opened: 7 April 1995; 31 years ago

Services
Preceding station	Warsaw Metro	Following station
Wierzbno towards Młociny	M1 line	Służew towards Kabaty
Location
- Location within Warsaw

Metro Wilanowska is a station on Line M1 of the Warsaw Metro, located in the Mokotów district of Warsaw at the junction of Aleja Niepodległości, Puławska Street, and Aleja Wilanowska, all main streets of Warsaw. It is an important transfer point to a large bus station serving routes through the city and to the surrounding towns and villages. Multiple tram lines and additional bus stops connect this transport hub with other parts of the city.

The name of the station "Wilanowska" stems from "Aleja Wilanowska" (Wilanowska Avenue), a main artery of 5,8 km connectiing the district of Mokotów to Wilanów.

The station was opened on 7 April 1995 as part of the inaugural stretch of M1, the first metro line in Warsaw, between Kabaty and Politechnika. The station will be a future interchange between the future M4.

== Cultural references ==
Polish rock group Elektryczne Gitary recorded a Polish-language cover of the Kinks' song Waterloo Sunset, which they named Stacja Wilanowska after the station, for their 1997 album Na Krzywy Ryj.
