= John Paul II Park (Warsaw) =

Urban park in Warsaw, Poland

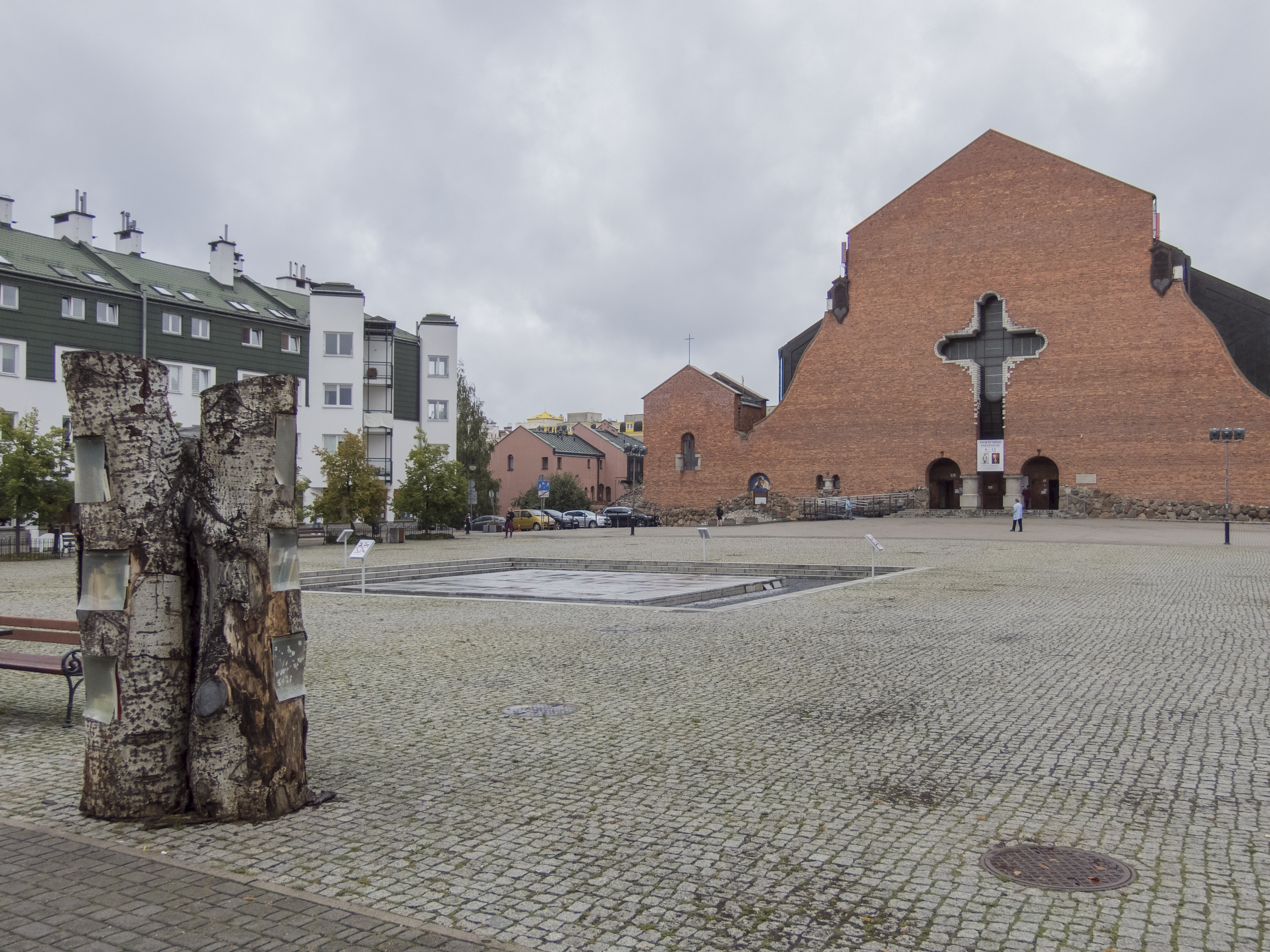
- The main square of the park with the Church of the Ascension of the Lord in the background.
- Interactive map of John Paul II Park
- Type: Urban park
- Location: Ursynów, Warsaw, Masovian Voivodeship, Poland
- Coordinates: 52°09′22″N 21°01′43″E
- Area: 4.3 hectares (11 acres)
- Created: 18 May 2000
- Designer: Dorota Sikora

The John Paul II Park (Polish: Park im. Jana Pawła II) is an urban park in the city of Warsaw in Masovian Voivodeship, Poland, within the district of Ursynów, between Romera Street and Melodyjna Street, opened in 2000.

== History ==
The park was designed by Dorota Sikora, and developed between 1999 and 2000, with a budget of 2.5 million Polish zloties. As part its development, a small urban square with a fountain in front of the Church of the Ascension of the Lord, a Roman Catholic parish church from 1989. The park was opened on 18 May 2000, on the 80th anniversary of the birth of its namesake, Pope John Paul II. The fountain was renovated in 2010. In 2012, the city of Warsaw granted the ownership of the parcels, on which the park is placed, to the district of Ursynów. In 2020, a graduation tower named Maciejka was opened in the park. It was financed from the 2018 municipal participatory budget.

== Characteristics ==
The park is located in the neighborhood of North Ursynów, within the district of Ursynów. It is laid out in front of the Church of the Ascension of the Lord, extending to Romera Street and Melodyjna Street with a total area of 4.3 ha.

The park is formed around an axis of two parallel alleys leading to the square before the church, flanked by a small soccer field to the left and a playground to the right, with a water fountain on the main square. It holds two rocks with commemorative plaques, dedicated to Pope John Paul II and the Polish exiles to Siberia.

The park also includes an artesian well and a graduation tower.

== Gallery ==
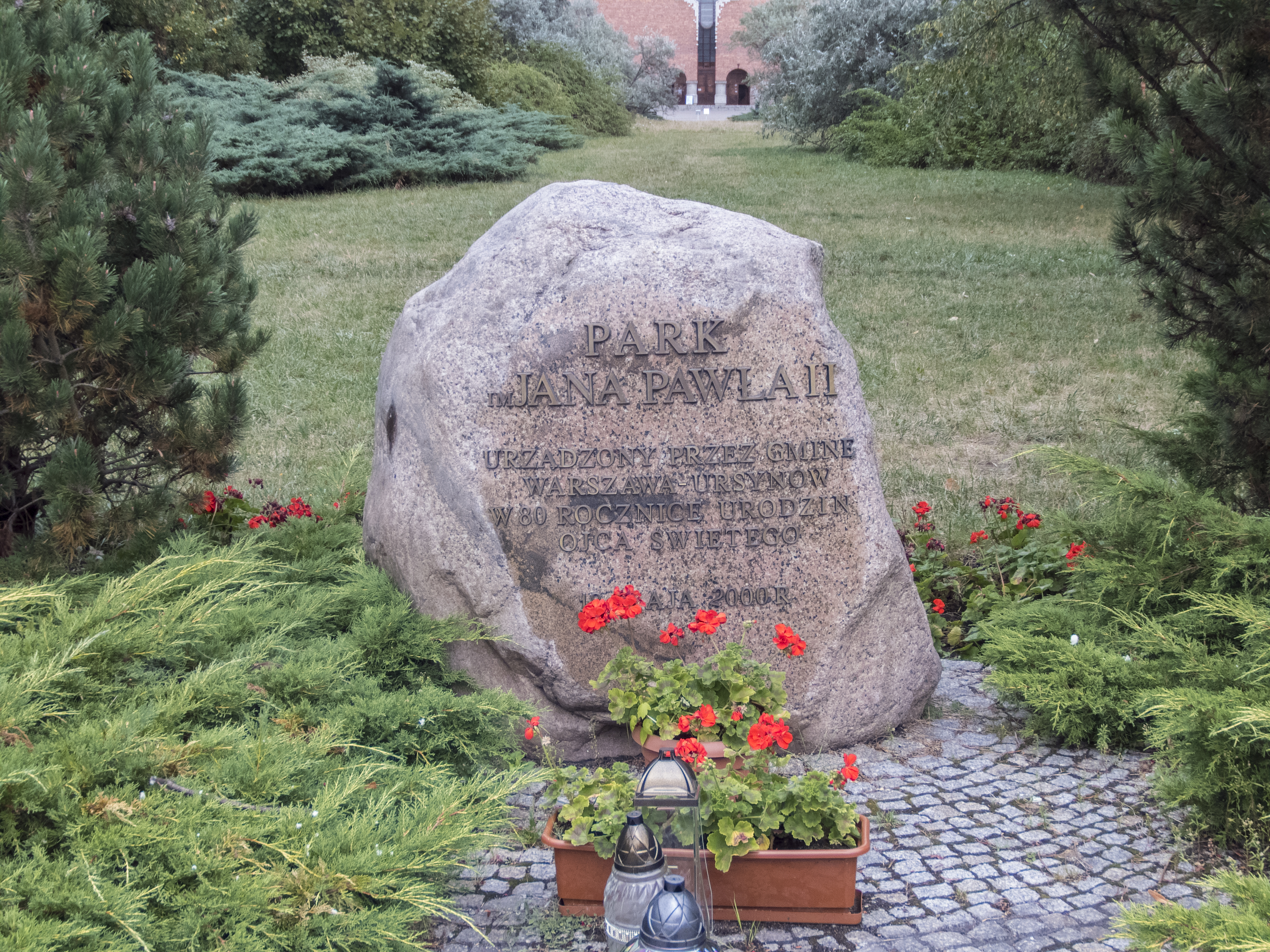
A boulder commemorating the establishment of the park

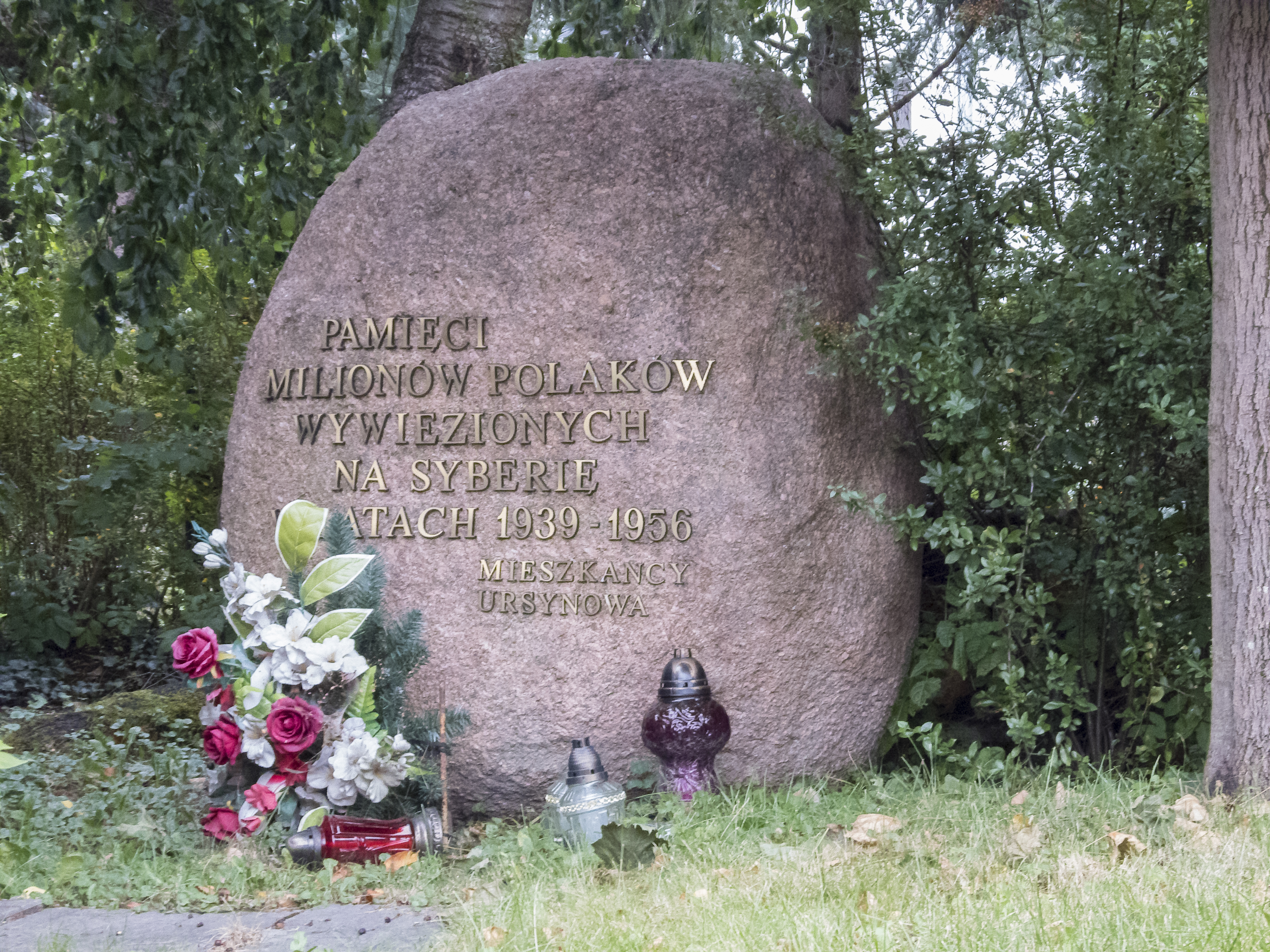
A boulder commemorating Poles exiled to Siberia.

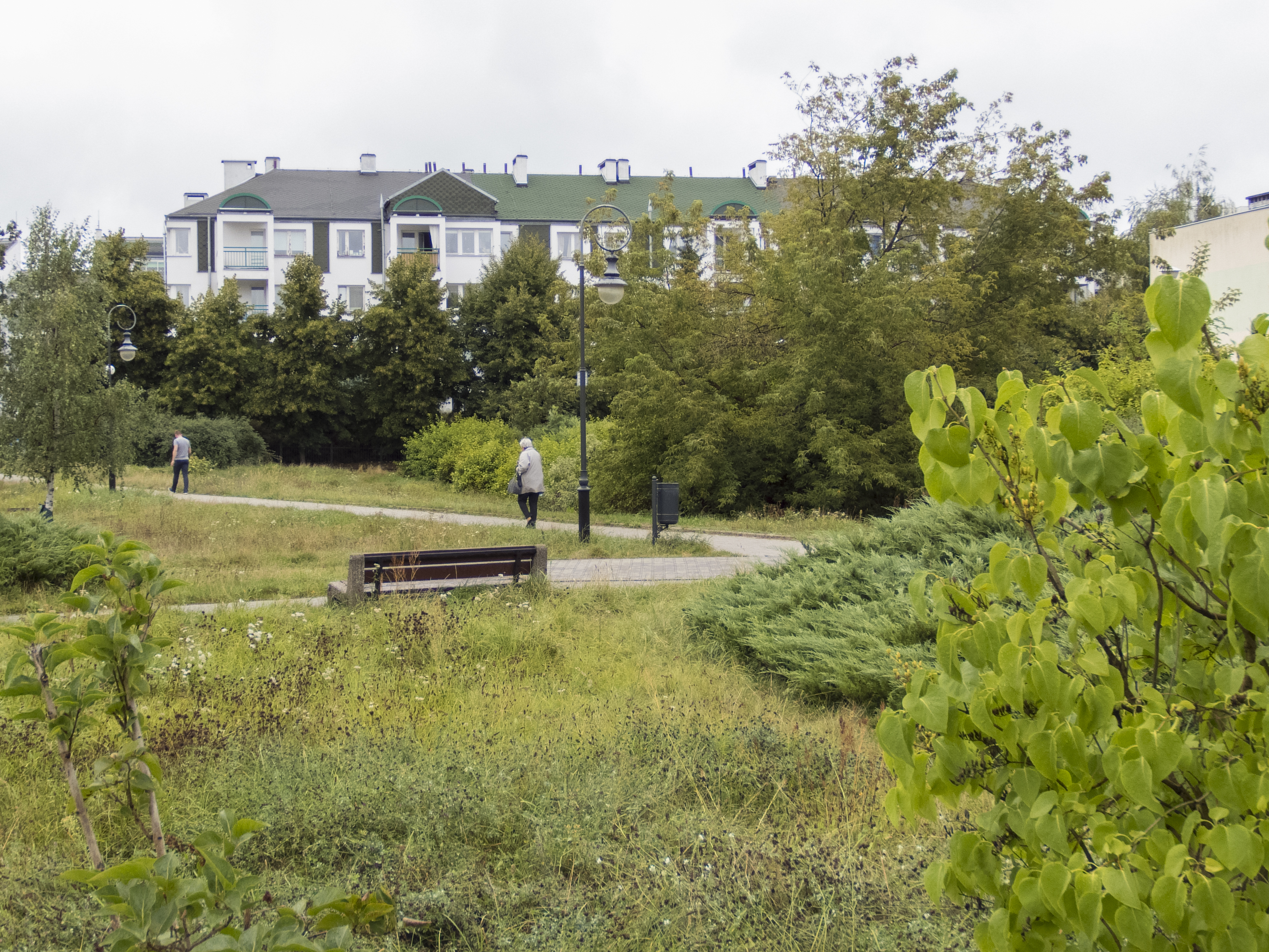
One of the park alleys
