= Roman Kozłowski Park =

Urban park in Warsaw, Poland

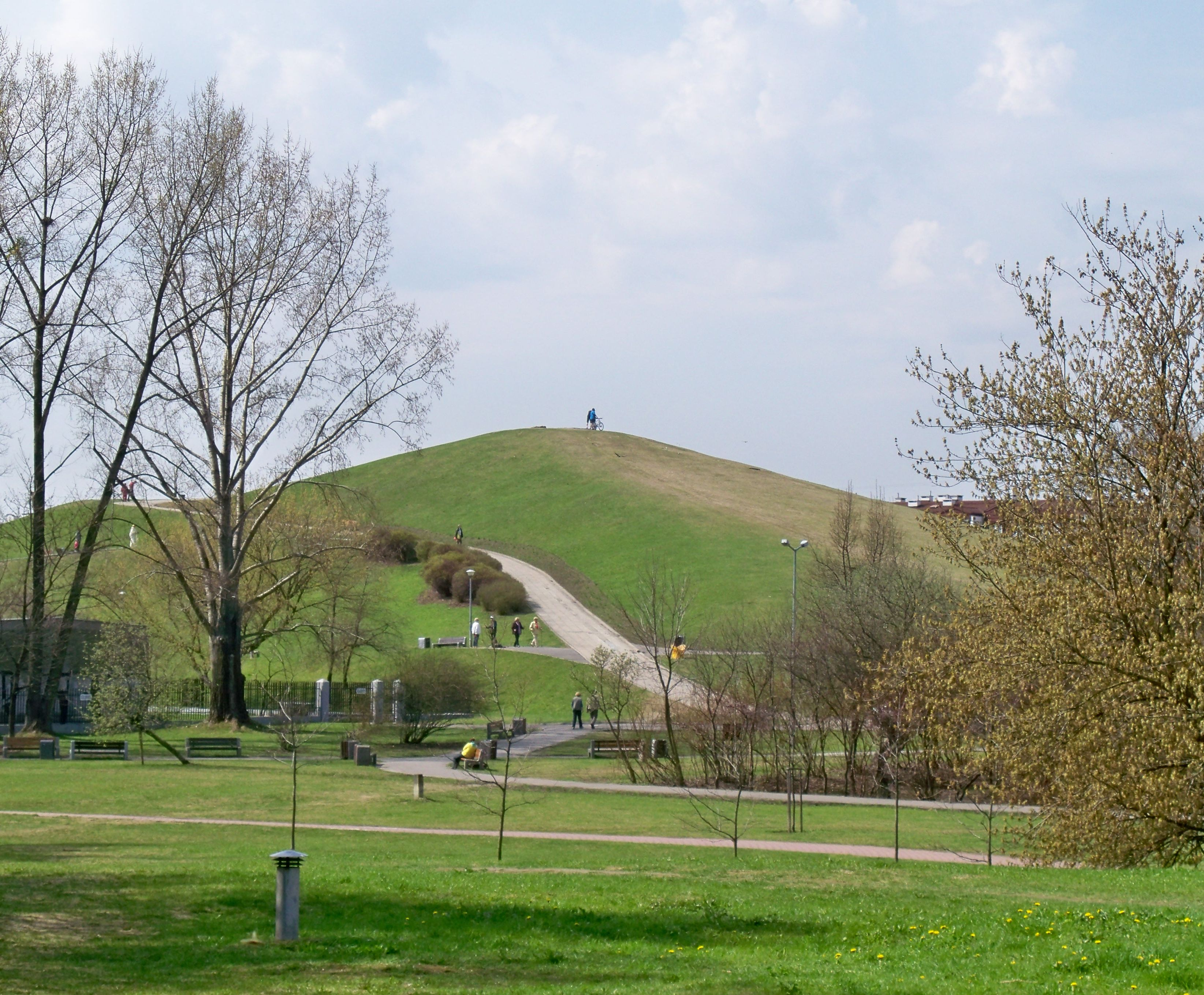
- The Cwil Mound in the Roman Kozłowski Park in 2012.
- Interactive map of Roman Kozłowski Park
- Type: Urban park
- Location: Ursynów, Warsaw, Poland
- Coordinates: 52°09′51″N 21°01′21″E
- Area: 11.6 hectares (29 acres)
- Created: 1977

The Roman Kozłowski Park (Note: Polish pronunciation: [ˈrɔ.man kɔˈzwɔf.ski]; Polish: Park im. Romana Kozłowskiego) is an urban park in Warsaw, Poland, located in the district of Ursynów, between Koński Jar Street, Nutki Street, Rzymowskiego Street, and Puszczyka Street. It was opened in 1977.

== History ==
The park was developed in the 1970s during the construction of Jary neighbourhood. In 1976, the Cwil Mound was formed, an artificial mound built from the ground excavated during local construction, and damaged building materials. It was proposed by engineer Henryk Cwil (1920–1990), after whom it was named.

The park was opened in 1977 and named after palaeontologist Roman Kozłowski. The same year, the sculpture Rider on Horse by Władysław Trojan was placed, as part of a series of twelve sculptures made in various techniques, known as the Ursynów Sculptures, located around the neighbourhood.

== Characteristics ==
The park is located in the neighbourhood of North Ursynów, within the district of Ursynów, between Koński Jar Street, Nutki Street, Rzymowskiego Street, and Puszczyka Street. It has a total area of 11.6 ha. The park includes the Cwil Mound, an artificial mound, 118 m high.

The sculpture Rider on Horse by Władysław Trojan is placed in the park, part of a series of twelve sculptures made in various techniques, known as the Ursynów Sculptures, located around the neighbourhood. Near Nutki Street is also the Ursynów Rock (Polish: Głaz Ursynowski), a nature monument and the largest glacial erratic in the city, with a height of 2.62 m and a circumference of 11.1 m.

== Gallery ==
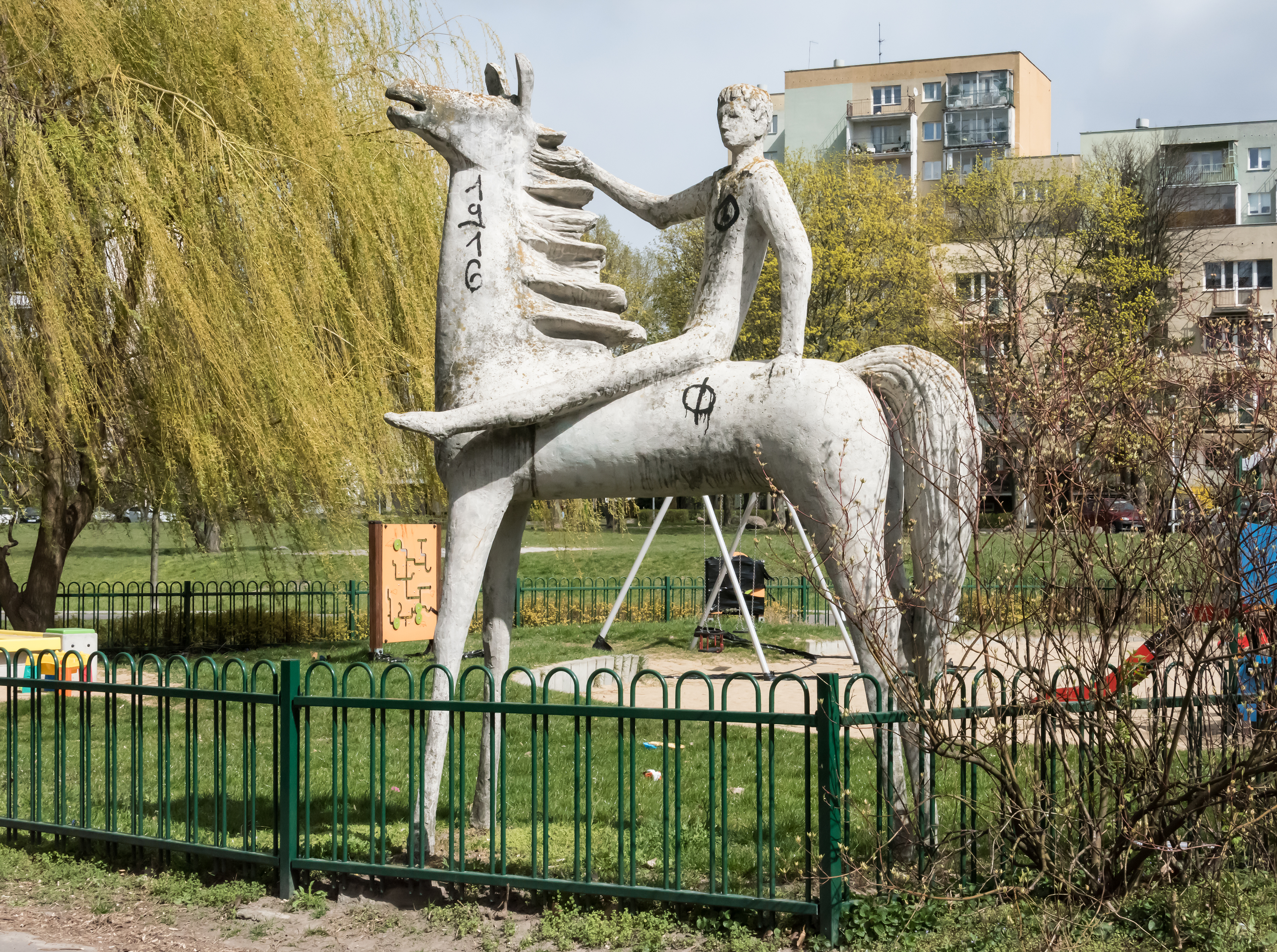
The sculpture Raider on Horse by Władysław Trojan in 2020.

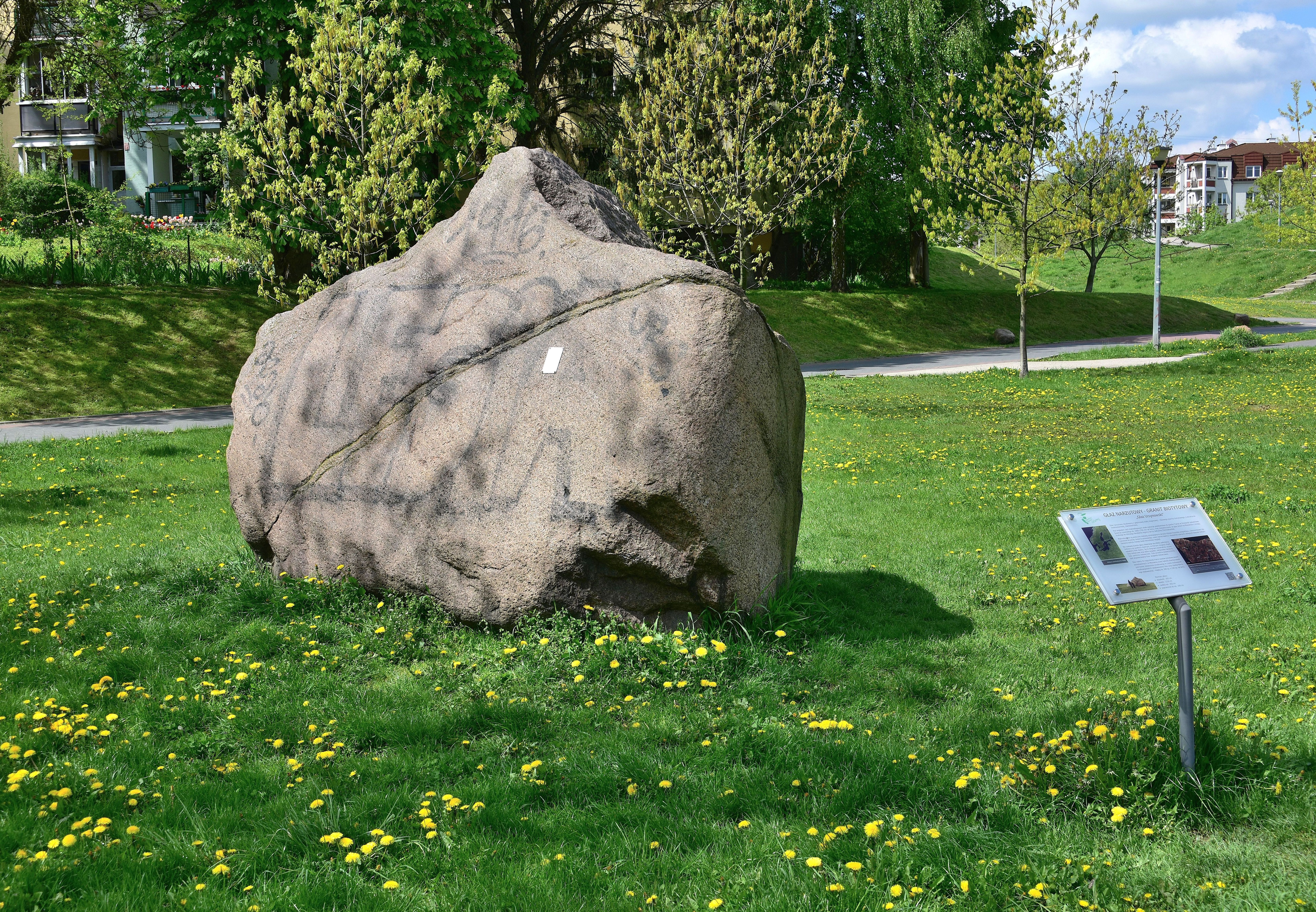
The Ursynów Rock, a nature monument and the largest glacial erratic in the city, in 2017.
