= Służew metro station =

Warsaw metro station

Służew
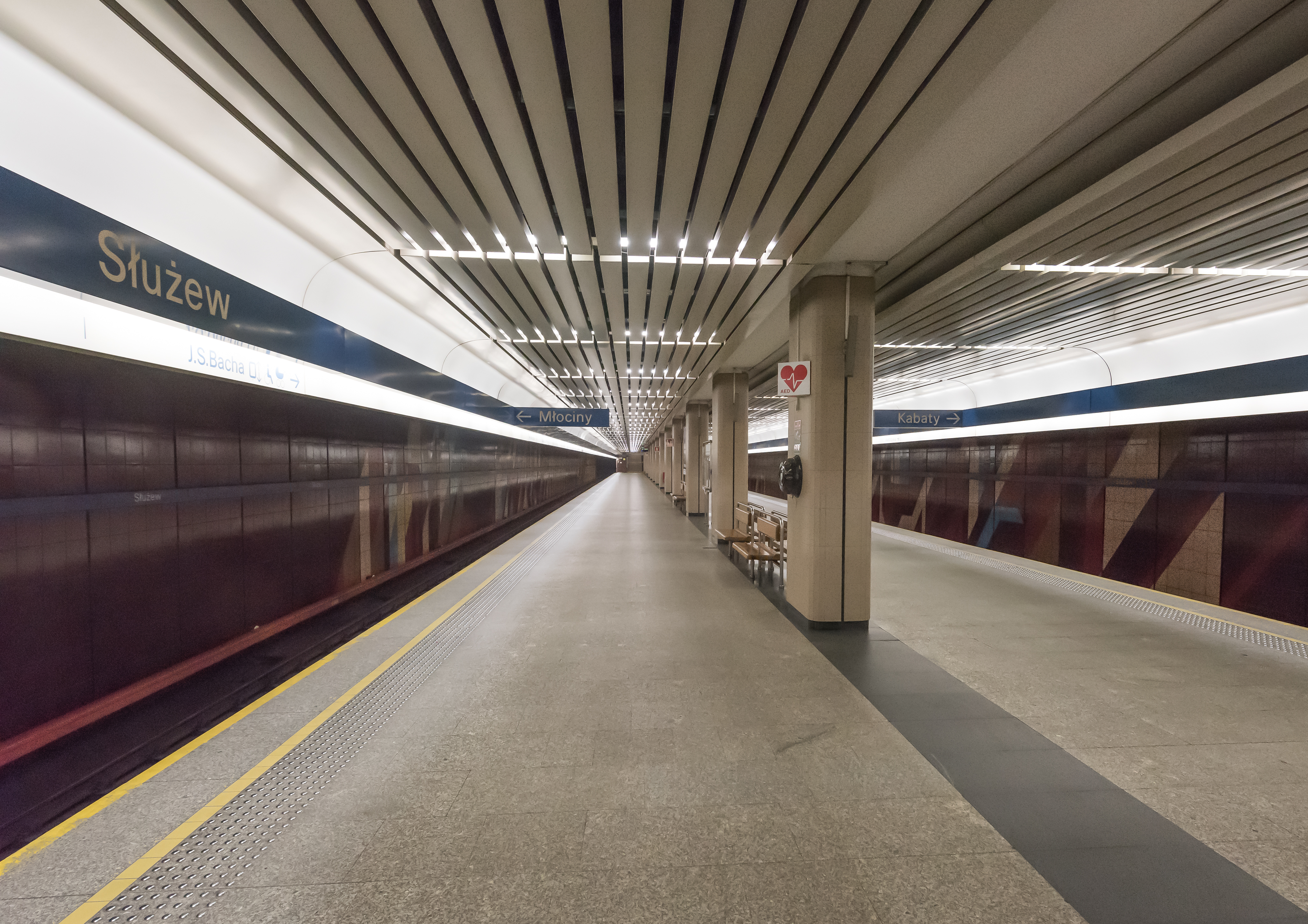

General information
- Coordinates: 52°10′22″N 21°1′35″E
- Owner: Public Transport Authority
- Platforms: 1 island platform
- Tracks: 2
- Connections: 189, 193, 317, 401, 402; N01, N33, N37, N50, N83

Construction
- Structure type: Underground
- Platform levels: 1
- Accessible: Yes

Other information
- Station code: A-6
- Fare zone: 1

History
- Opened: 7 April 1995; 31 years ago

Services
Preceding station	Warsaw Metro	Following station
Wilanowska towards Młociny	M1 line	Ursynów towards Kabaty
Location
- Location within Warsaw

Metro Służew is a station on Line M1 of the Warsaw Metro, located in the Służew neighborhood in south Warsaw, at the junction of Wałbrzyska and Rolna Streets.

The station was opened on 7 April 1995 as part of the inaugural stretch of the Warsaw Metro, between Kabaty and Politechnika.
