= Church of the Ascension of the Lord (Warsaw) =

- Kościół Wniebowstąpienia Pańskiego w Warszawie Ursynowa
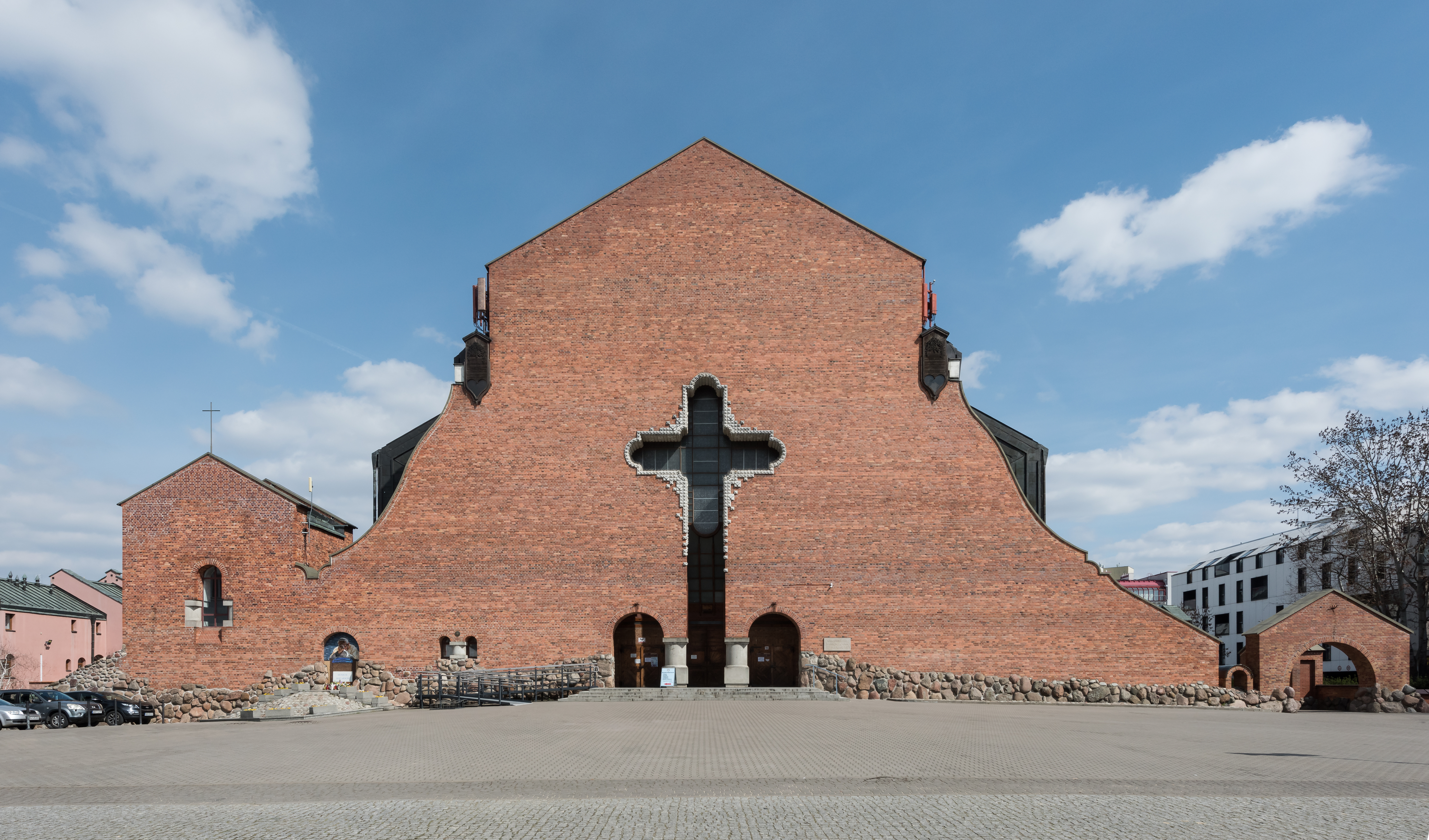
- Front facade of the church in 2021

Religion
- Affiliation: Catholic
- Diocese: Warsaw
- Ecclesiastical or organisational status: Parish church
- Year consecrated: May 29, 2003; 23 years ago by Cardinal Józef Glemp
- Status: Active

Location
- Location: Warsaw, Poland
- Interactive map of Church of the Ascension of the Lord
- Coordinates: 52°09′26″N 21°01′51″E

Architecture
- Architects: Marek Budzyński, Zbigniew Badowski, Piotr Wicha
- Style: Modern
- Groundbreaking: March 5, 1982; 44 years ago
- Completed: 1989; 37 years ago

Specifications
- Length: 44 m (140 ft)
- Width: 32 m (100 ft)
- Materials: brick, concrete

Website

Church of the Ascension of the Lord (Kościół Wniebowstąpienia Pańskiego w Warszawie Ursynowa)is a Roman Catholic church located in the Ursynów district in Warsaw.

The church houses the Image of the Persevering Seeker Our Lady of Ursynów crowned with primatial crowns by cardinal Józef Glemp. The church also contains relics of Saint Pope John Paul II, Warsaw's Archbishop St. Zygmunt Szczęsny Feliński, St. Fr. Pio, St. Sister Faustina, Bl. Fr. Jerzy Popiełuszko and Bl. Fr. Antoni Rewera.

== History ==
In the turn of 1975 and 1976, Fr. Tadeusz Wojdat, then parish priest of St. Sophie Barat in Grabów, first applied for the location of the church. Initially, the authorities refused, but on March 21, 1980, permission to build a church in Ursynów was granted, and in July, the location at al. Komisji Edukacji Narodowej 101 was indicated. Permission for preliminary construction work was issued on December 1, 1980.

On April 12, 1981, the first mass was celebrated on the site of the current church. On May 3, Bishop Jerzy Modzelewski blessed the site for construction, and on September 1, the first temporary catechetical building was put into use. Simultaneously, the Metropolitan Curia of Warsaw approved the church project by Dr. Eng. Arch. Marek Budzyński and Eng. Arch. Zbigniew Badowski. Construction of the actual church began on March 5, 1982, and on November 28, the Primate of Poland, Józef Glemp laid the foundation stone and foundation act. On December 25, Bishop Władysław Miziołek blessed the lower church, which was put into use in a raw state. In 1984, nuns from the Congregation of the Daughters of St. Francis Seraphic from Sandomierz arrived at the parish. On February 23, a fire broke out on the construction site, which took about 8 hours to extinguish. This fire delayed further construction.

On December 1, the curia established the Parish of the Ascension of the Lord in Warsaw (Roman Catholic). About 35,000 people lived in the newly established parish.

On May 28, 1987, a permanent administrative-catechetical building was put into use, and on May 4, 1989, the church was put into use in a raw state. On September 1, 1992, the I Catholic Social High School started operating on the church premises, and from January 1996, the monthly parish magazine – "Ursynów News" began to appear. On May 21, 1998, Cardinal Józef Glemp blessed the completed lower church. From September 1998, a socio-therapeutic center Caritas and the parish choir Vox Cordis began operating in the administrative wing of the building. On April 16, 2000, a bell tower was put into use, on which a bell previously hanging on a temporary structure and two new bells were hung. On May 29, 2003, Cardinal Józef Glemp consecrated the upper church, and on June 18, 2006, he crowned the image of Our Lady the Persevering Seeker. A re-coronation took place on June 18, 2011. Meanwhile, in September 2006, concert organs were put into use. The first organ concert took place in October 2008.

In front of the church on May 18, 2000, on the 80th anniversary of the Pope's birthday, the park named after John Paul II was opened.

The church building appears in several films (including Decalogue I by Krzysztof Kieślowski) and music videos (including Mars Attacks by Kazik Staszewski and Polish Meat by T.Love).
