= Cwil Mound =

Mound in Warsaw, Poland

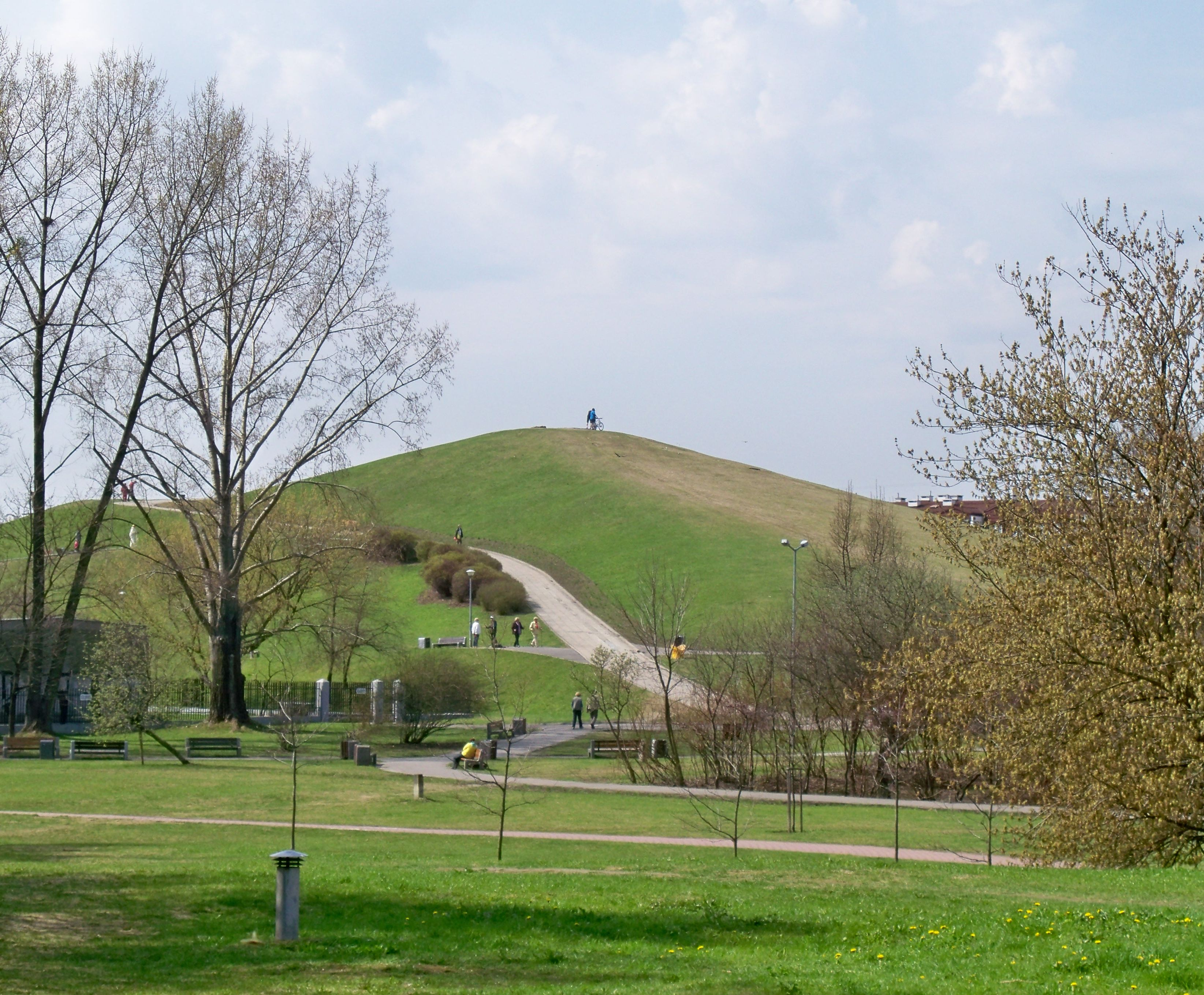
- Cwil Mound in 2012.

Highest point
- Elevation: 118 m (387 ft)
- Coordinates: 52°09′52″N 21°01′20″E

Geography
- Country: Poland
- Voivodeship: Masovian
- City: Warsaw

The Cwil Mound (Polish pronunciation: [ˈt͡sfil]; Polish: Kopa Cwila, Kopiec Cwila), also known as the Cwil Mountain (Polish: Góra Cwila), is a mound in Roman Kozłowski Park, in the city of Warsaw, Poland, within the Ursynów district. It was built in 1976, and has a height of 118 m.

== History ==
The artificial mount was built in 1976, during the construction of the neighbourhood of Jary. It was made from the dirt excavated during local construction, and damaged building materials that were disposed off into the pile. It was proposed by engineer Henryk Cwil (1920–1990), after whom it was later named. The Roman Kozłowski Park, centred around the mound, was opened in 1977.
