= Stokłosy metro station =

Warsaw metro station

Stokłosy
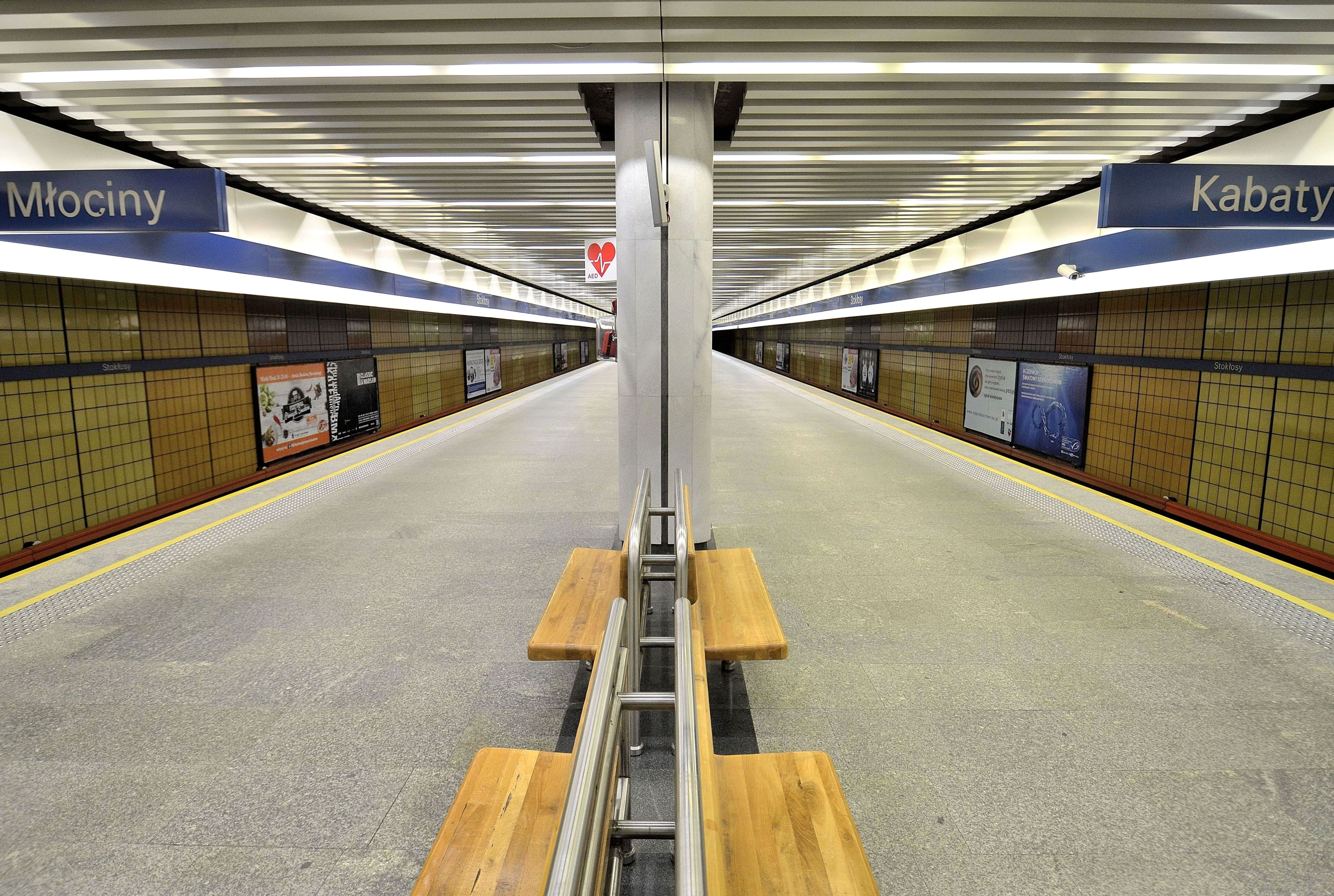

General information
- Coordinates: 52°9′22″N 21°2′5″E
- Owner: Public Transport Authority
- Platforms: 1 island platform
- Tracks: 2
- Connections: 179, 192, 193, 209, 401, 715, 737, 809, 815; N37

Construction
- Structure type: Underground
- Platform levels: 1
- Accessible: Yes

Other information
- Station code: A-4
- Fare zone: 1

History
- Opened: 7 April 1995; 31 years ago

Services
Preceding station	Warsaw Metro	Following station
Ursynów towards Młociny	M1 line	Imielin towards Kabaty
Location
- Location within Warsaw

Metro Stokłosy is a station on Line M1 of the Warsaw Metro, located in the Stokłosy neighbourhood of the Ursynów district in south Warsaw at the junction of Aleja KEN, Herbsta Street and Jarzębowskiego Street. It is situated between Imielin and Ursynów stations.

The station was opened on 7 April 1995 as part of the inaugural stretch of the Warsaw Metro, between Kabaty and Politechnika.
