= Ursynów metro station =

Warsaw metro station

Ursynów
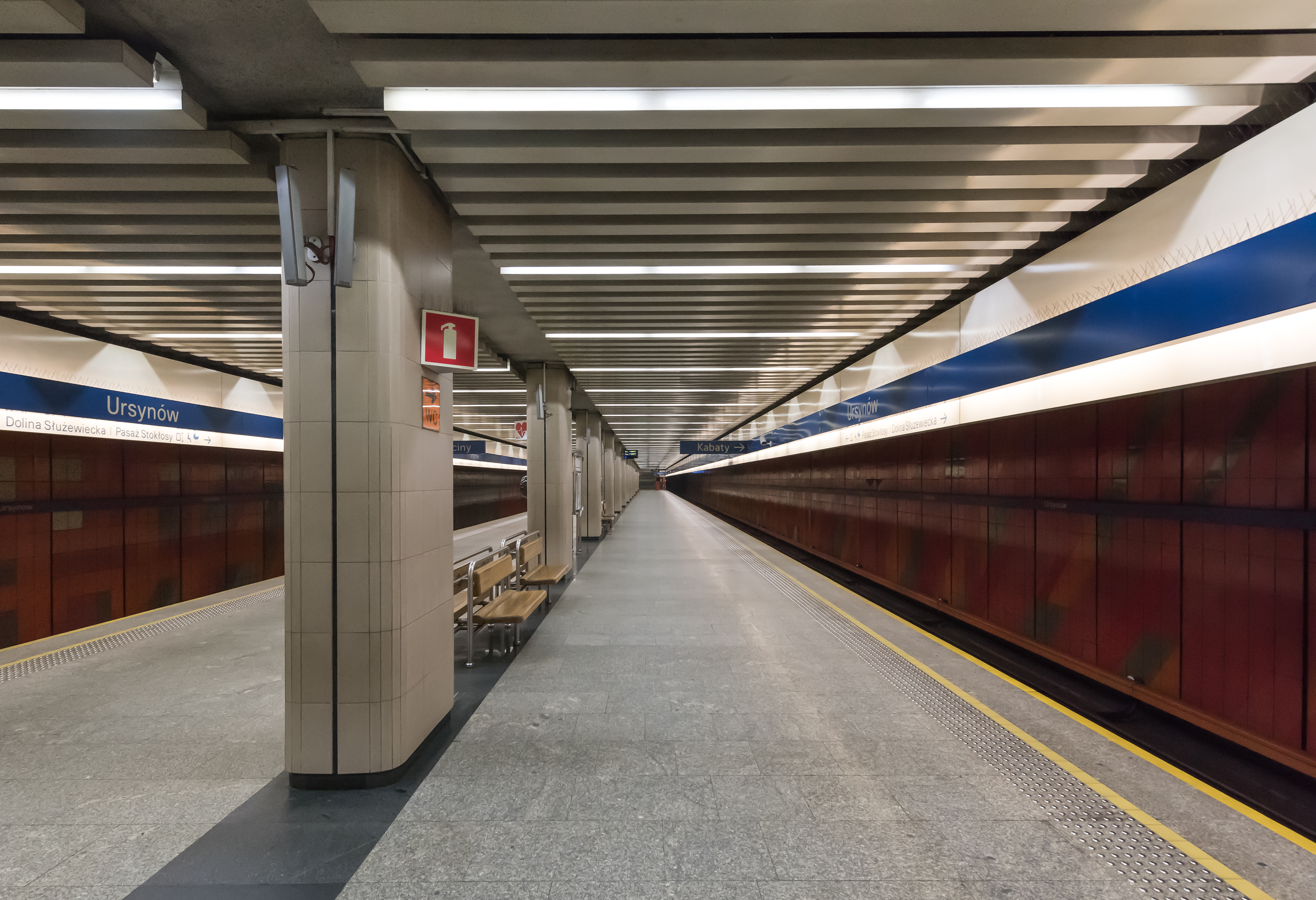

General information
- Coordinates: 52°9′43″N 21°1′40″E
- Owner: Public Transport Authority
- Platforms: 1 island platform
- Tracks: 2
- Connections: 136, 179, 715, 737; N01, N03, N34, N37

Construction
- Structure type: Underground
- Platform levels: 1
- Accessible: Yes

Other information
- Station code: A-5
- Fare zone: 1

History
- Opened: 7 April 1995; 31 years ago

Services
Preceding station	Warsaw Metro	Following station
Służew towards Młociny	M1 line	Stokłosy towards Kabaty
Location
- Location within Warsaw

Metro Ursynów is a station on Line M1 of the Warsaw Metro, located in the Ursynów district in south Warsaw, at the junction of Aleja KEN and Surowieckiego Street.

The station was opened on 7 April 1995 as part of the inaugural stretch of the Warsaw Metro, between Kabaty and Politechnika.
