= Vistula University =

Private university in Warsaw, Poland

Coordinates: 52°9′32″N 21°2′3″E

- Akademia Finansów i Biznesu Vistula
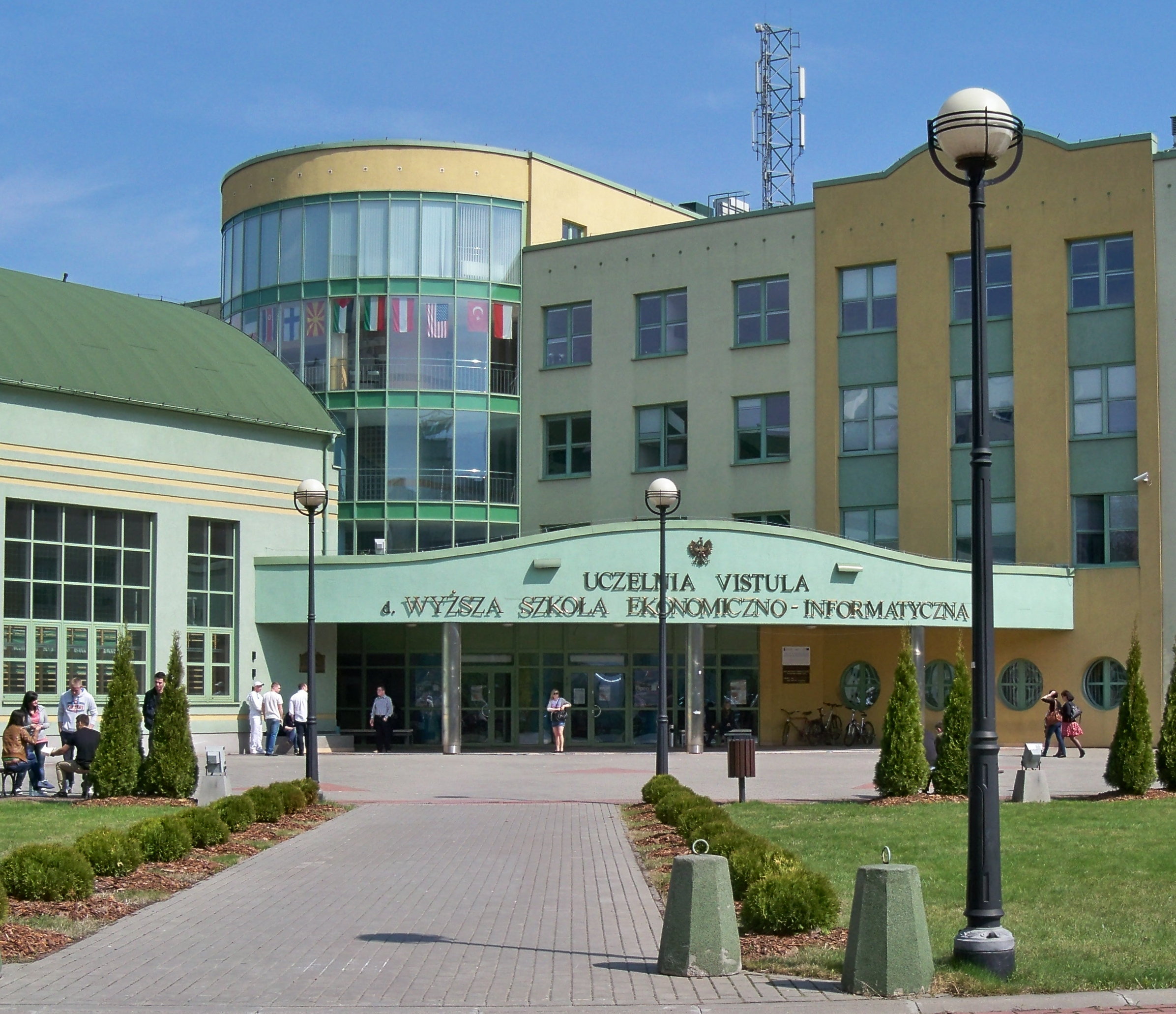
- Established: 1 October 1992
- Rector: Wawrzyniec Konarski, PhD, DSc
- Students: 10,800 (12.2023)
- Location: Warsaw, Masovia, Poland
- Campus: Urban
- Website: https://www.vistula.edu.pl

University rankings

Regional – Overall
- QS Emerging Europe and Central Asia: 401-450 (2022)

Vistula University (VU; Polish: Akademia Finansów i Biznesu Vistula, AFiB Vistula, lit. 'Vistula Academy of Finance and Business') is a private university based in Warsaw, Poland.

The university has authorization to award doctoral degrees in the disciplines of Economics and Finance, History, Management and Quality Studies and Political Science and Public Administration.

In the Perspektywy 2024 ranking, it is ranked 4th among the best non-public universities in Poland.

== History ==
Vistula University was established in 1991 as the University of Insurance and Banking. In January 1992, it was entered in the register of non-public higher education institutions of the Ministry of National Education and Sport under number 2.

Currently, Vitula University together with the Vistula School of Hospitality (formerly the Warsaw School of Tourism and Hospitality Management) are the primary members of the Vistula Group of Universities.

In 2005, The Senate of the University of Insurance and Banking made the decision to change the name of the university to the Academy of Finance.

In 2012, The Academy of Finance is joined by Vistula University (formerly the Higher School of Economics and Information in Warsaw - WSE-I,) at the same time the Academy of Finance is renamed as Vistula University (Polish: Akademia Finansów i Biznesu Vistula).

2014 – Vistula University incorporates the European Academy of Arts in Warsaw.

2015 – Vistula University incorporates the University of Management in Warsaw.

In 2019, Aleksander Gieysztor Academy of Humanities in Pułtusk became one of its branches.

In 2025 they joined the European University Association as full members.

== Vistula Group of Universities ==
Vistula University together with the Vistula School of Hospitality (formerly the Warsaw School of Tourism and Hospitality Management) form the main pillars of the Vistula Group of Universities. In 2014, they were joined by the University of Business in Wrocław (currently the Wroclaw Business University of Applied Sciences), and in 2018, the Aleksander Gieysztor Academy of Humanities in Pułtusk and the Olsztyn University of Józef Rusiecki. The Vistula Group of Universities offers 56 fields of study.

== Studies at Vistula University ==
The university conducts bachelor's, master's, engineering and postgraduate study programs in full-time, part-time and online modes, in Polish and English. The educational offer also comprises MBA programs and doctoral studies.

== Accreditations and certificates ==
- ACCA
- CIMA
- CEEMAN
- PMI Global Accreditation Center for Project Management Education Programs
- Accreditation by Eurostat – European Statistical Office, Vistula University has been entered on the elite list of recognized research institutions.
- HR Excellence in Research – the title is awarded to institutions that have supported and effectively implemented the "European Charter for Researchers" and the "Code of Conduct for the Recruitment of Researchers".

== Structure ==
- Faculty of Business and International Relations
- Faculty of Philology and Journalism
- Foreign Languages Centre
- Faculty of Computer Science, Graphic Design and Architecture
- Research and Science Centre

== Asia Research Institute ==
The Asia Research Institute was established in 2017 (initially under the name "Asia Research Centre"). It aims to conduct scientific research focused on contemporary Eurasia and on the current initiative to reactivate the historical mechanism of the Silk Road. The institute works on developing education programs, among others, as part of summer schools launched at Vistula University and directed towards contemporary Asia and the Silk Road, conducted in both Polish and in foreign languages. It is also responsible for the preparation of tailor-made postgraduate study programs for representatives of various specialties for establishing business cooperation with the Far East countries.

== Confucius Classroom ==
Vistula University hosts the Confucius Classroom, which was established to promote Chinese language, tradition and culture. It is a platform to facilitate intercultural understanding and mutual exchange of knowledge. This is the first such project at a non-public university in Poland. The Confucius Classroom offers Chinese language courses at two levels of proficiency.

== Publishing House ==
The Vistula Group Publishing House has issued numerous specialist publications in the field of economics, computer science, international relations, sociology, finance and accounting, banking, tourism and recreation, management, European integration and philology. The publications include, among others academic textbooks and collective works developed by academics and didactic staff of universities and other Polish and foreign scientific institutions, as well as by practitioners. The most recent publications of Vistula University include:

- Świat i Polska, Longin Pastusiak, Warszawa 2019;
- Państwo, jego bezpieczeństwo ekonomiczne. Aspekt teoretyczny i praktyczny, Joanna Antczak, Danuta Milczewska, Zdzisław Rapacki, Warszawa 2018;
- Prezydenci Stanów Zjednoczonych. Jimmy Carter – Donald Trump 1977-..., Longin Pastusiak, Warszawa 2018;
- Szlak Jedwabny i Chiny: historia i dzień dzisiejszy, Wojciech Hubner, Warszawa 2018;
- Prezydenci Stanów Zjednoczonych. Benjamin Harrison – Gerald F. Ford 1833-1977, Longin Pastusiak, Warszawa 2018;
- Polityka wobec bezpośrednich inwestycji zagranicznych. Ograniczanie kosztów, Zbigniew Zimny, Warszawa 2018;
- Siła we współczesnych stosunkach międzynarodowych, redakcja naukowa: Wojciech Kostecki, Kamil Smogorzewski, Warszawa 2018;
- Corporate Accounting in the Unstable World, Mirosław Bojańczyk, Warszawa 2017;
- Rynek zabezpieczeń finansowych I produktów ubezpieczeniowych w kontekście działalności biur podróży, Małgorzata Maliszewska, Piotr Kociszewski, Krzysztof Łopaciński, Warszawa 2017;
- Warsztaty jako nowoczesna forma zajęć akademickich, Zdzisław Rapacki, Joanna Antczak, Grzegorz Marek Poznański, Warszawa 2017;
- Zaufanie i kapitał społeczny w polskim biznesie, Dariusz J. Błaszczuk, Jan Fazlagić, Robert Skikiewicz, Warszawa 2017;
- Prezydenci Stanów Zjednoczonych. Jerzy Waszyngton – Grover Cleveland 1789-1889, Longin Pastusiak, Warszawa 2017;
- Polityka wobec bezpośrednich inwestycji zagranicznych. Wnioski dla Polski, Zbigniew Zimny, Warszawa 2017;
- Zarządzanie komunikacją w organizacjach globalnych – uwarunkowania, bariery, efekty. Analiza na przykładzie Meeting Professionals International, Krzysztof Celuch, Warszawa 2017.

The publishing house also issues university periodicals:

- “Vistula University Working Papers”
- “Vistula Scientific Quarterly”;
- “A VISTA – Student Internet Notebooks of Vistula University”.

== Previous Rectors ==
- 2000-2010 – Prof. Paweł Bożyk
- 2010-2014 – Prof. Krzysztof Rybiński, PhD
- 2014-2016 – Marek Kulczycki, PhD
- 2016-2019 – Prof. Witold Orłowski
- 2019 – Prof. Wawrzyniec Konarski, PhD
