= Służew (City Information System area) =

Neighbourhood in Warsaw, Poland

- City Information System area (neighbourhood)
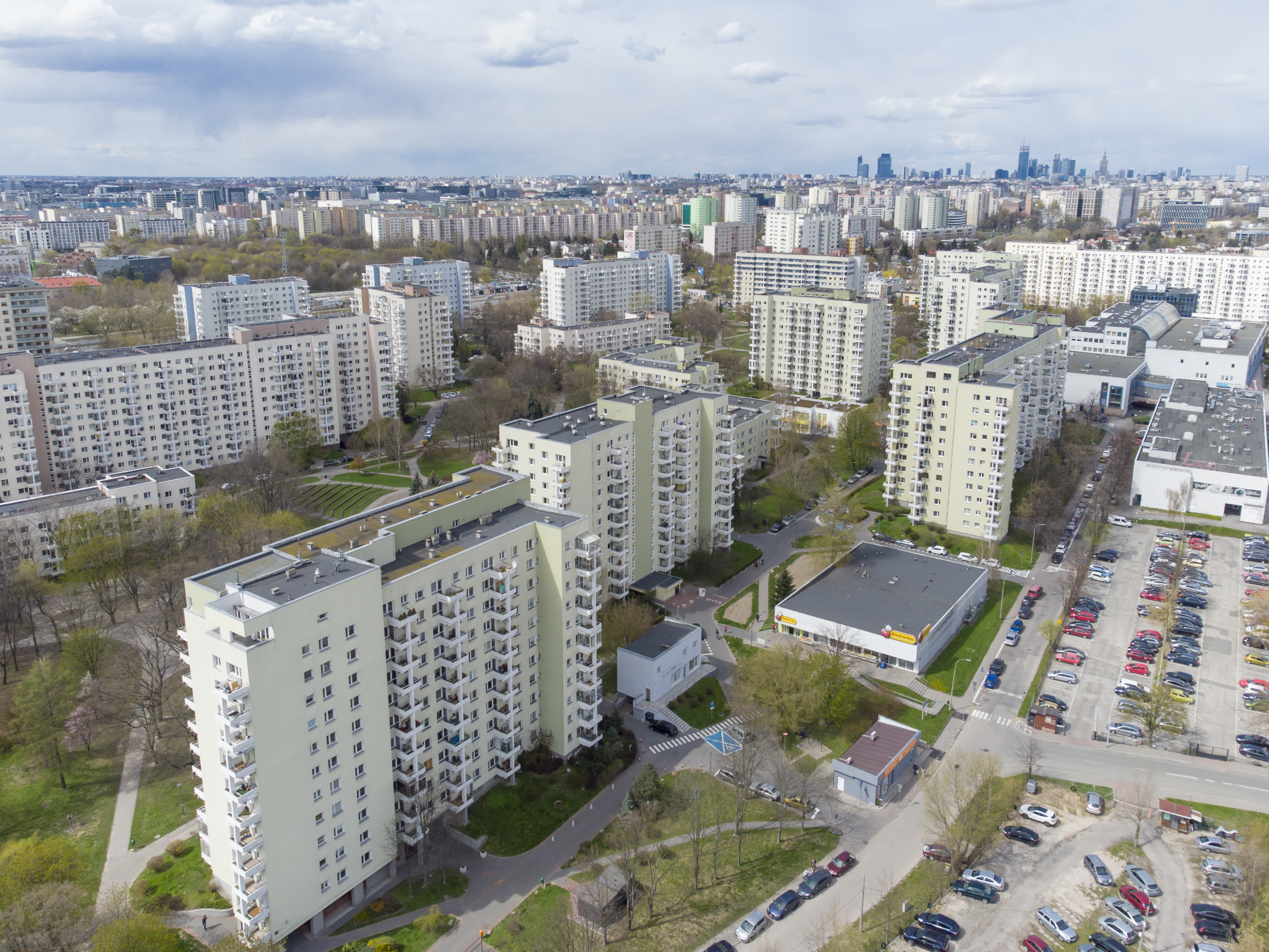
- The apartment buildings at Batuty Street in 2012.

- The location of the City Information System area of Służew within the Mokotów district.
- Coordinates: 52°10′09″N 21°01′53″E
- Country: Poland
- Voivodeship: Masovian
- City and county: Warsaw
- District: Mokotów
- Subdistrict: Upper Mokotów
- Administrative neighbourhood: Służewiec Południowy
- Time zone: UTC+1 (CET)
  - Summer (DST): UTC+2 (CEST)
- Area code: +48 22

Służew (Polish: [ˈswu.ʐɛf]) is a neighbourhood, and a City Information System area, in Warsaw, Poland, within the Mokotów district. It is a residential area with housing estates of apartment buildings, including Służew Fort, Służew nad Dolinką, and Służewiec-Prototypy, as well as single-family neighbourhood of Służew-Parcele. The Łazarski University and the Institute of Physics of the Polish Academy of Sciences are also present in the neighbourhood. Służew is connected to the Warsaw Metro rapid transit underground system, with the Służew of the M1 line. The neighbourhood forms the western portion of the historic area of Służew, with Stary Służew (Old Służew) to the east, and is part of the western half of the district, known as the Upper Mokotów.

In 1886, the Fort VIIA, were built in the area as part of the series of fortifications of the Warsaw Fortress. It was decommissioned in 1909, and partially demolished in 1913. In 1932, the neighbourhood of villas, known as Służew-Parcele, was developed nearby. The area was incorporated into the city in 1938. In the 1960s and 1970s, the housing estates of Służew Fort, Służew nad Dolinką, and Służewiec-Prototypy were developed in the area. In 1995, the Służew station of the Warsaw Metro was opened.

== Toponomy ==
The name Służew comes from the archaic Polish word służ, an equivalent to modern służyć, which means to serve. It comes from the historical village of Służew (now forming the neighbourhood of Stary Służew), from the fact that until the 19th century, the area was inhabited by serfs, peasants who served the local noble families.

== History ==
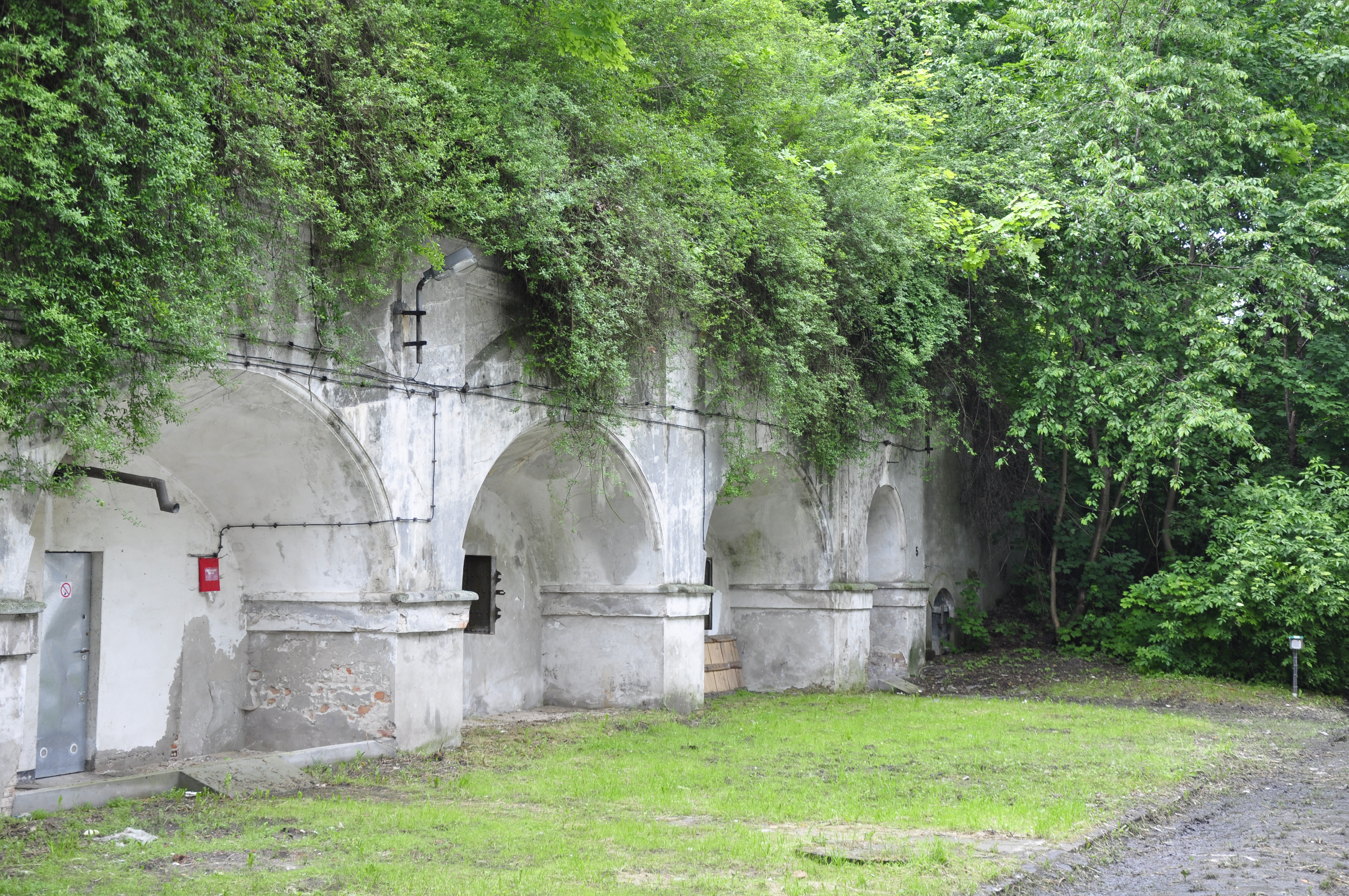
The Fort IIA Służewiec, built in 1886.

Signs of human settlements from the Stone Age (4000 BCE and 2000 BCE), Bronze Age (3300 BCE to 1200 BCE), and of the Lusatian culture (1300 BCE to 500 BCE) have been found in the area of Warsaw Escarpment and Służewiec Stream.

In 1886, the Fort VIIA Służewiec was built near Służew as part of the series of fortifications of the Warsaw Fortress, erected around Warsaw by the Imperial Russian Army. It was decommissioned in 1909, and partially demolished in 1913.

In 1900, the Służew New Cemetery was founded at Wałbrzyska Street, as an extension of the Służew Old Cemetery at Fosa Street.

In 1932, around 275 ha of farmland to the northwest of Służew was divided and sold out for housing construction. The area was developed into a neighbourhood of villas, known as Służew-Parcele, placed on the axis of Wałbrzyska Street. The Służew Square, surrounded by townhouses, was also developed to the south, at the corner of Puławska and Wałbrzyska Streets. The area became an exclusive neighbourhood for the city's elite, including high-ranking members of the government and military, politicians, businesspeople, and scientists. The villas were designed by numerous noteworthy architects, in various styles, such as Art Deco, modernism, and Polish manor house.

In 1937, the St. Joseph Monastery of the Dominican Order, was built nearby, at 2 Dominikańska Street. In the 1950s, a half of its land was confiscated by the government, and to protect the rest, it was turned into the St. Dominic Church, becoming a seat of a parish which encompassed Służew. A new church building was opened in 1994.

The area was incorporated into Warsaw on 27 September 1938.

In 1944, while under the German occupation in the Second World War, most of the houses in Służew-Parcele were set on fire by German officers in retaliation for the Warsaw Uprising.

In 1953, the Institute of Physics of the Polish Academy of Sciences was founded with headquarters at 32 and 46 Lotników Avenue. It is a research facility focused on solid-state and atomic physics. In 1966, the Institute of Electronic Technologies was also founded with headquarters in the same building complex. In 2020, it was joined with the Institute of Electronic Technologies and Materials, forming the Łukasiewicz Institute of Microelectronics and Photonics, which conducts research on advanced materials, micro- and nanoelectronics and photonics.

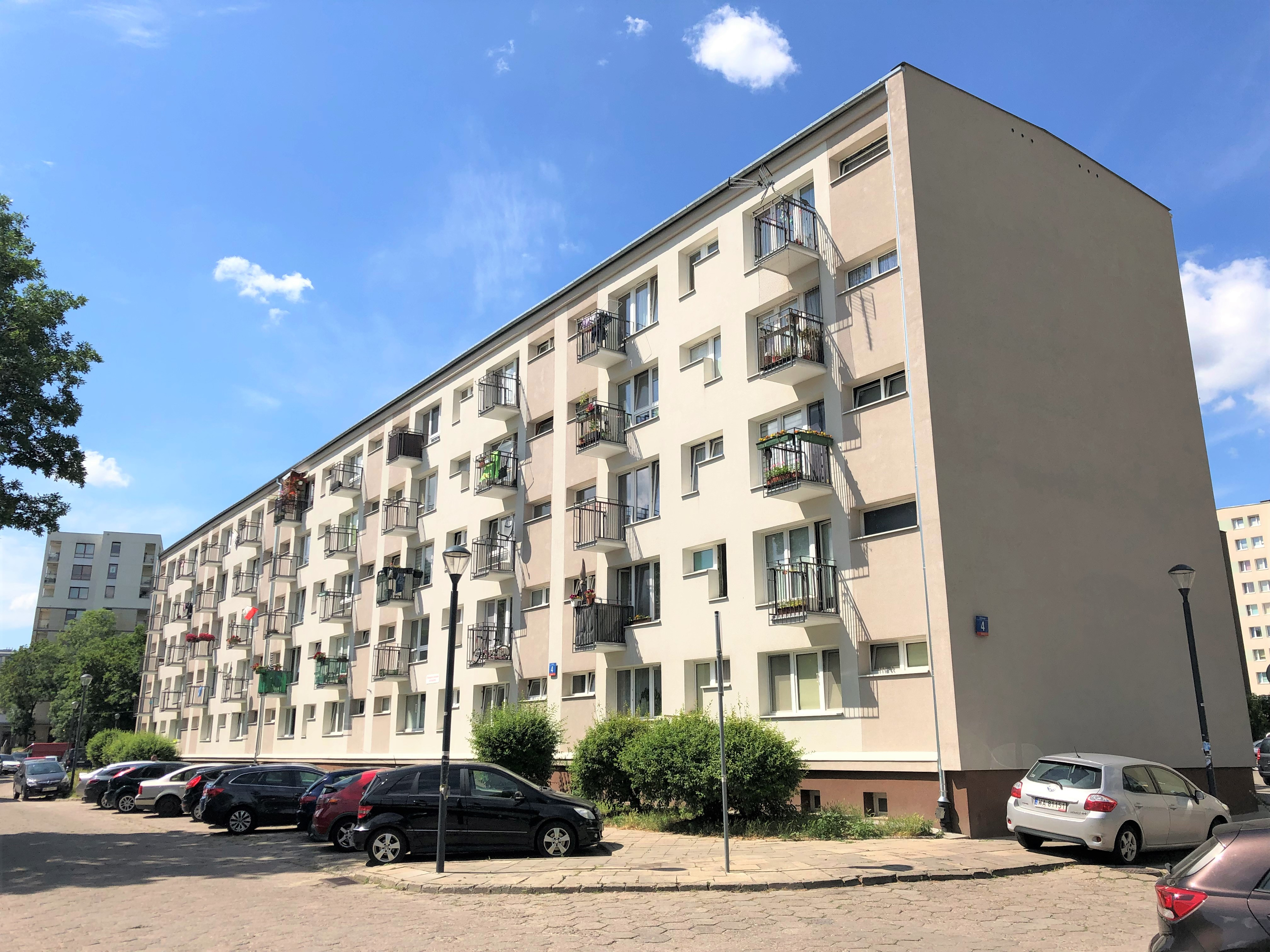
One of the multifamily residential buildings of Służewiec-Prototypy, built in the 1960s.

Between 1960 and 1965, the housing estate of Służewiec-Prototypy, was built to the northwest of the historic neighbourhood between Lotników Avenue, Modzelewskiego Street, Bokserska Street, and Obrzeżna Street, with Rzymowskiego Street as its main axis. Consisting of high-rise multifamily buildings, the neighbourhood was constructed as a test ground for new technologies and urbanist solutions, such as various large-panel-system building techniques. The observation of various types of building during and after their construction was intended to allow for the improvement of new projects, comparison of existing ones and implementation of cost-reducing solutions. It was the first and the largest research ground of its kind in Poland. The neighbourhood was designed with modernist apartment buildings. It was intended to provide housing for the employees of numerous factories in the nearby industrial district of Służewiec, located within walking distance from it.

Between 1972 and 1979, two more housing estates were developed in the area. This included Służew Fort, located between Wilanowska Avenue, Puławska Street, and Lotników Avenue, and Służew nad Dolinką, between Kmicica, Wałbrzyska, Nowoursynowska, Łukowa, and Dolina Służewska Streets. They consisted of mid- and high-rise multifamily residential buildings constructed in the large-panel-system technique. Additionally, the Służew Little Valley Park was developed nearby, alongside Służewiec Stream, and Dolina Służewska Street.

In 1978, the Faculty of Management of the University of Warsaw was moved to two buildings at 1 and 3 Szturmowa Street. It was the first university faculty in Poland dedicated to the management education. The campus was expanded with third building opened in 2002, with the former two being renovated between 2004 and 2005.

Between 1979 and 1988, the St. Maximilian Maria Kolbe Church, belonging to the Catholic denomination, was constructed at 35 Rzymowskiego Street.

In 1994, the historical area of Służew was divided into two parts, separated by the Dolina Służewiecka Street. The southeastern, historical part of the neighbourhood became a part of the municipality of Warsaw-Ursynów, while the rest to the northwest, a part of the municipality of Warsaw-Centre. In 1998, both municipalities were divided into areas of the City Information System , with the north becoming Służew, and south, Stary Służew (known as Stary Ursynów until 2000). In 2002, the municipalities were replaced by the city districts of Mokotów in the north and Ursynów in the south. In 2001, two neighbourhoods governed by locally elected councils were founded in the area. They were Służewiec Fort, including the neighbourhood of Służew Fort and the Institute of Physics of the Polish Academy of Sciences, and Służewiec Południowy (South Służewiec), which consisted of Służewiec-Prototypy, and the southern portion of Służewiec Przemysłowy. Służewiec Fort was abolished in 2016.

In 1995, the Służew station of the M1 line of the Warsaw Metro rapid transit underground system, was opened at the intersection of Harcerzy Rzeczypospolitej Avenue, Rolna Street, and Wałbrzyska Street.

In 1999, the shopping mall Land was opened at 11 Wałbrzyska Street. Currently, it is planned to be demolished and replaced with an office building.

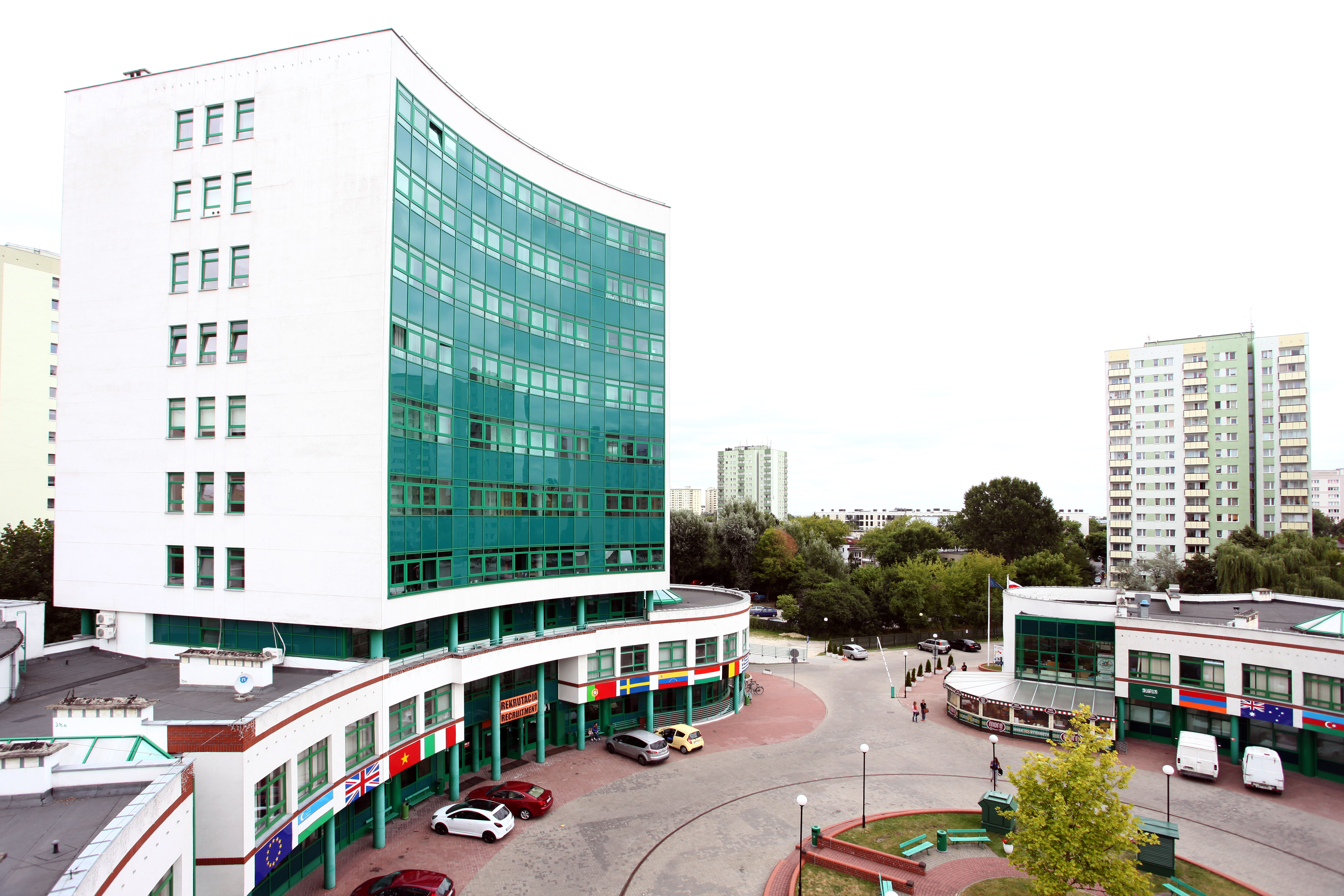
The campus of the Łazarski University, built in 2002.

In 2002, the campus of Łazarski University was opened 43 Świeradowska Street.

In 2005, the Polish Audiovisual Publishing House was founded as a subdivision of the Ministry of Culture and National Heritage, with the headquarters at 3 and 5 Wałbrzyska Street. In 2009, it was restructured into the National Audiovisual Institute, tasked with the digitisation, sharing and promotion of Polish audiovisual heritage. In 2017, it was joined with the National Film Archive, forming the National Film Archive and Audiovisual Institute, which is one of the largest archives of film and audio in Europe.

In 2014, the Służew House of Culture community centre was opened at 15 Bacha Street, near the Służewiec Pond. The modernist complex was designed to resemble a small village, with several wooden pavilions including amenities such as several rooms, amphitheatre, play area, and a barn with animals. Before its opening, the community centre was housed in repurposed cargo containers that had been used since 1993. In 2015, the World Peace Bell was unveiled nearby. It was a copy of the artwork from 1989, displayed at 55 Bukowińska Street, which was stolen in 2002. The original was one of 50 identical bells, gifted by Hiroshima and Nagasaki in Japan, which were destroyed in 1945 atomic bombings, to numerous cities across the globe, as a symbol of world peace.

== Housing and economy ==
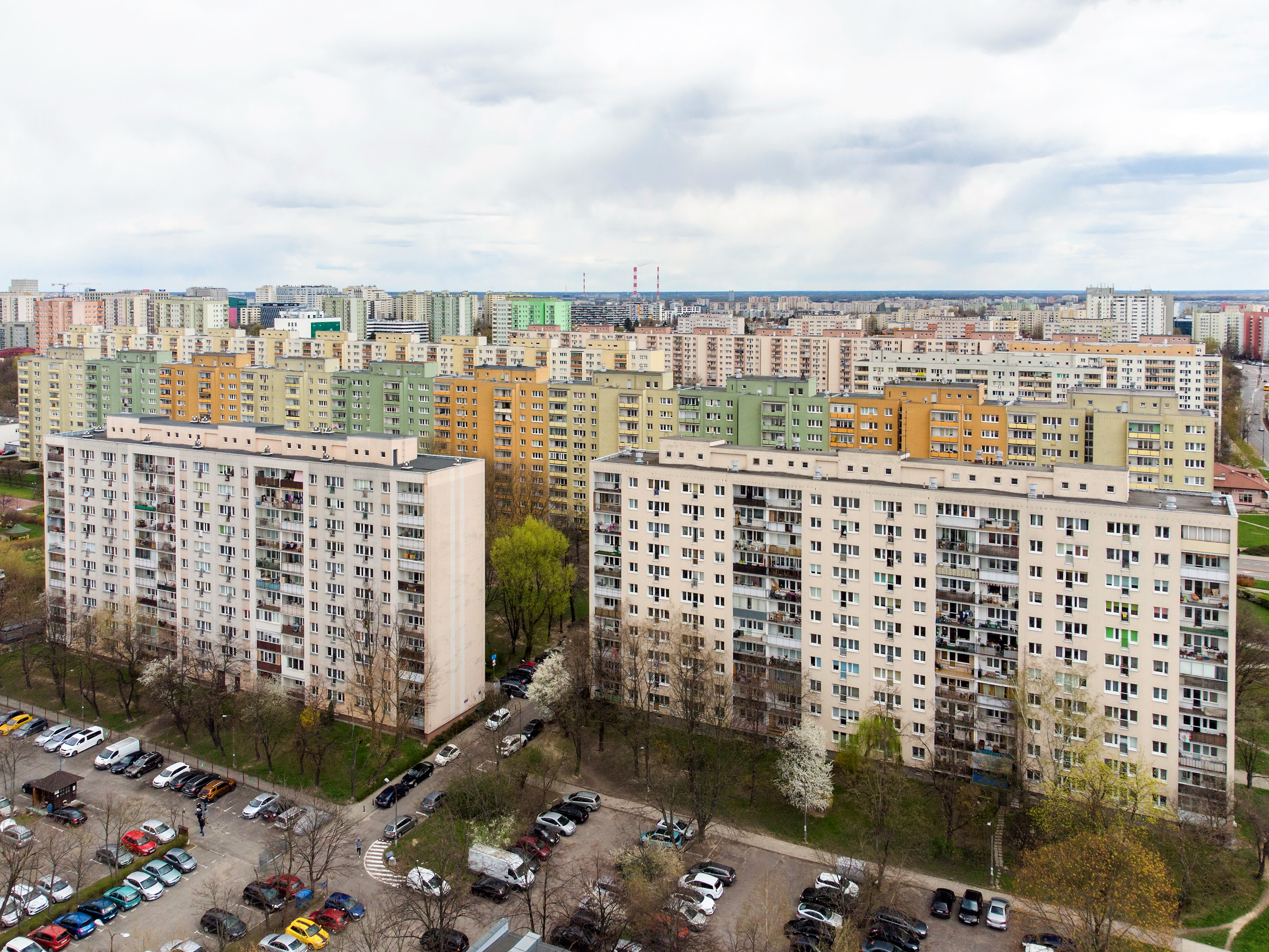
The apartment buildings in Służew-Fort.

The neighbourhood features several large mid- and high-rise housing estates with apartment buildings, including Służew Fort, located between Wilanowska Avenue, Puławska Street, and Lotników Avenue; Służew nad Dolinką, between Kmicica, Wałbrzyska, Nowoursynowska, Łukowa, and Dolina Służewska Streets; and Służewiec-Prototypy, between Lotników Avenue, Modzelewskiego Street, Bokserska Street, and Obrzeżna Street. Additionally, the area also has a low-rise neighbourhoods with detached and semi-detached single-family houses. This includes Służew-Parcele, between Puławska Street, Wilanowska Avenue, Dominikańska Street, and Wałbrzyska Street; as well as the eastern portion of Służew Fort.

Służew also features the shopping mall Land at 11 Wałbrzyska Street.

== Higher education and science ==
Służew includes the research complex at 32 and 46 Lotników Avenue, which houses the Institute of Physics of the Polish Academy of Sciences focused on solid-state and atomic physics, and Łukasiewicz Institute of Microelectronics and Photonics, focused on micro- and nanoelectronics and photonics. The neighbourhood also contains the campus of the Łazarski University at 43 Świeradowska Street, as well as the Faculty of Management of the University of Warsaw at 1 and 3 Szturmowa Street.

== Culture ==
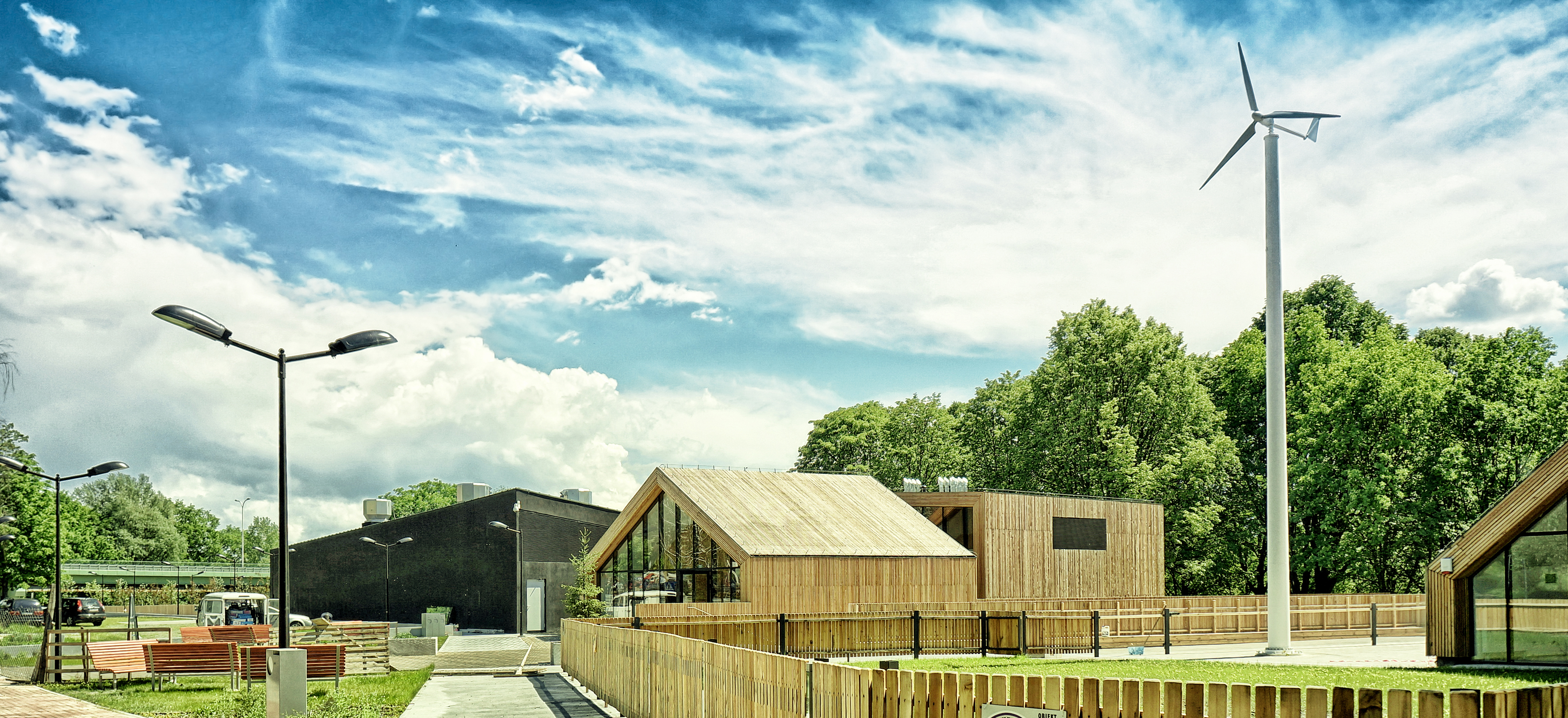
The Służew House of Culture.

The neighbourhood features the Służew House of Culture community centre at 15 Bacha Street. The modernist complex conists of several wooden pavilions and includes amenities such as several rooms, amphitheatre, play area, and a barn with animals. The World Peace Bell is also placed nearby. Unveiled in 2015, it is a copy of a 1989 bell gifted by Hiroshima and Nagasaki to the city, as a symbol of world peace, stolen in 2002.

The neighbourhood also includes the National Film Archive and Audiovisual Institute, one of the largest archives of film and audio in Europe, is located at 3 and 5 Wałbrzyska Street, and the Fort VIIA Służewiec, decommissioned fortifications dating to 1886.

== Parks and nature ==
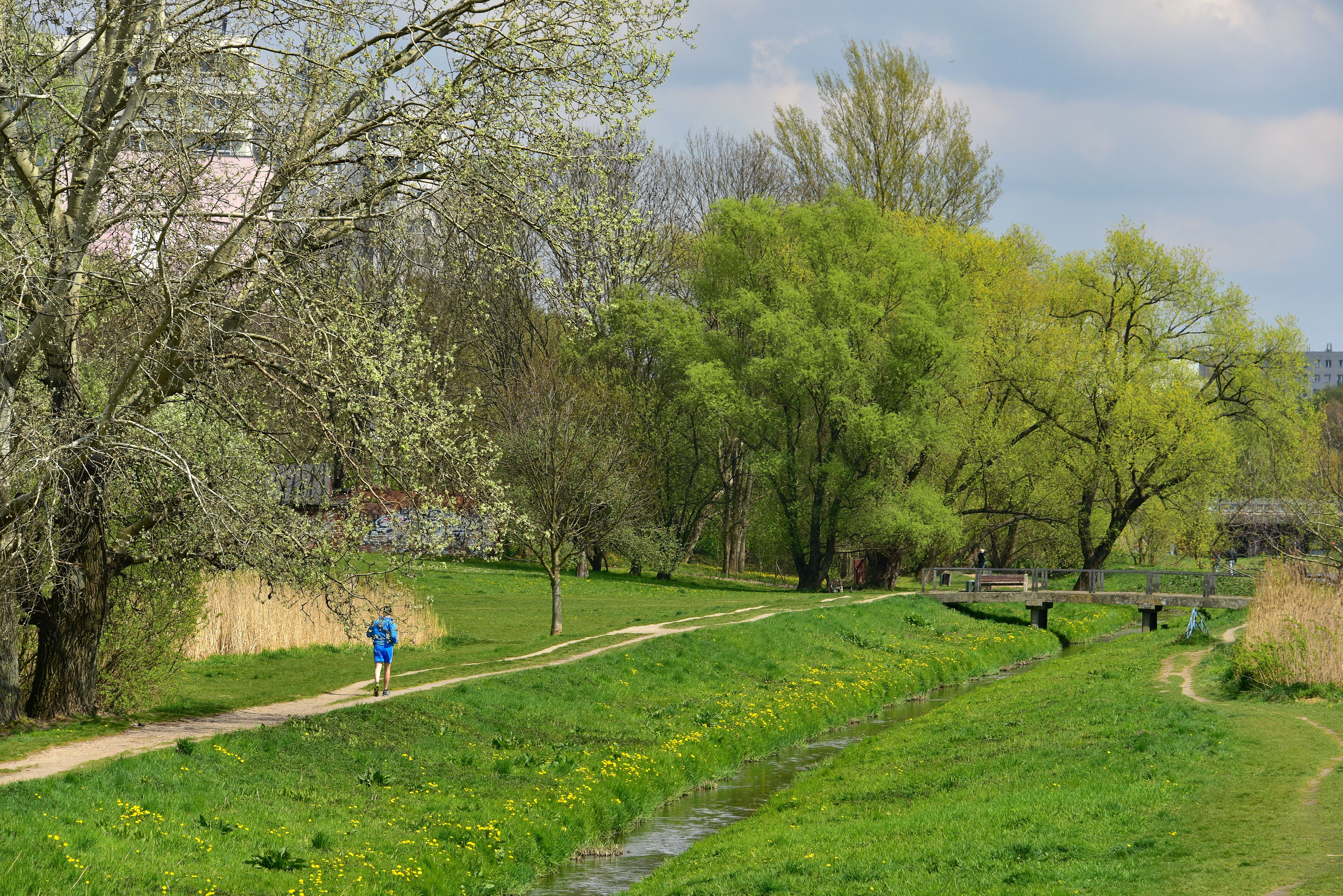
The Służewiec Stream in the Służew Little Valley Park.

The neighbourhood features a strip of green land, including Służew Little Valley Park and Służewiec Pond Park, stretching alongside Dolina Służewska Street. It is crossed by the Służewiec Stream and feagures several lakes, with the Służewiec Pond being the largest among them.

== Transport ==
The neighbourhood features the Służew station of the M1 line of the Warsaw Metro rapid transit underground system, placed at the intersection of Harcerzy Rzeczypospolitej Avenue, Rolna Street, and Wałbrzyska Street.

== Religion ==
The neighbourhood has two Catholic churches, the St. Maximilian Maria Kolbe Church at 35 Rzymowskiego Street, and the St. Dominic Church at 2 Dominikańska Street. The latter is also adjusted to the St. Joseph Monastery of the Dominican Order, built in 1937. Additionally, the neighbourhood includes the Służew New Cemetery at Wałbrzyska Streets. Moreover, the Kingdom Hall of Jehovah's Witnesses is located in Służew at 48 Wałbrzyska Street.

== Boundaries and subdivisions ==
Służew is a City Information System area located in the southwest portion of the Mokotów district. Its boundaries are approximately determined by Wilanowska Avenue to the north; Dolina Służewska Street, Wyścigowa Avenue, and Bokserska Street to the south; and Obrzeżna Street to the west. The neighbourhood borders Służewiec to the northeast, Ksawerów to the north, Stegny to the northeast, Stary Służew to the southeast, North Ursynów to the south, and Wyczółki to the southeast.

The eastern part of the area is included within the neighbourhood of Służewiec Południowy (South Służewiec), governed by an elected council. It also contains the southern half of the nearby Służewiec. The area of Służew contained within said neighbourhood is located between Wilanowska Avenue, Lotników Avenue, Puławska Street, Dolina Służewska Street, Bokserska Street, Wyścigowa Street, and Obrzeżna Street.
