= Służew =

Neighbourhood in Warsaw, Poland

- Neighbourhood
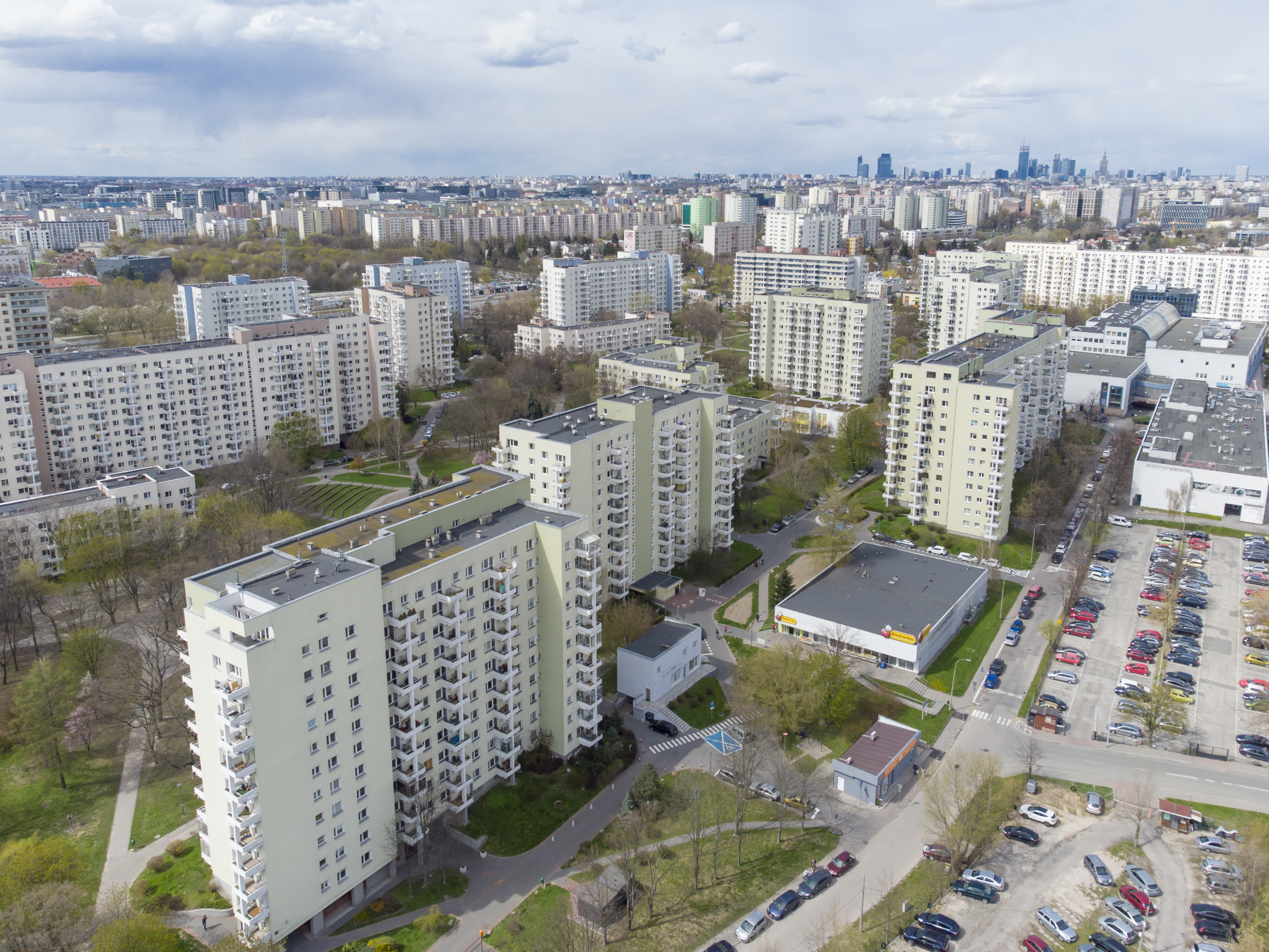
- The apartment buildings at Batuty Street in 2012.
- Interactive map of Służew
- Coordinates: 52°10′09″N 21°01′53″E
- Country: Poland
- Voivodeship: Masovian
- City and county: Warsaw
- Districts: Mokotów; Ursynów
- City Information System areas: Stary Służew; Służew
- Administrative neighbourhood: Służewiec Południowy
- Time zone: UTC+1 (CET)
  - Summer (DST): UTC+2 (CEST)
- Area code: +48 22

Służew (Polish: [ˈswu.ʐɛf]) is a neighbourhood in Warsaw, Poland, located at the boundary of the districts of Mokotów and Ursynów. It is a residential area with housing estates of apartment buildings, including Służew Fort, Służew nad Dolinką, and Służewiec-Prototypy, as well as single-family neighbourhoods of houses, including Służew-Parcele, and Stary Służew. The area also features several 19th-century historical buildings, such as St. Catherine Church, Krasiński Palace, and two decommissioned fortifications, designated as Fort IIA, and Fort III. The campuses of Warsaw University of Life Sciences and Łazarski University, as well as the Institute of Physics of the Polish Academy of Sciences are also present in the neighbourhood. The area is connected to the Warsaw Metro rapid transit underground system, with the Służew of the M1 line. The area is divided into two City Information System areas: Służew in the west, within the Mokotów district, and Stary Służew (Old Służew) in the east, within the Ursynów district.

Służew dates back to at least the 13th century, when it was a small farming community. In 1238, the St. Catherine Church was founded there, with its Catholic parish becoming the oldest within the current boundaries of Warsaw. It was later rebuilt in the 19th century. In 1245, the village became the property of the knight Gotard of Służew, whose descendants formed the Służewiecki family of the Radwan heraldic clan, who owned this land until the 17th century. In 1776, the Krasiński Palace was constructed there. In 1886, two forts, designated as VIIA and VIII, were built near Służew as part of the series of fortifications of the Warsaw Fortress. They were decommissioned in 1909, and partially demolished in 1913. In 1932, the neighbourhood of villas, known as Służew-Parcele, was developed to the northwest of the village. The entire area was incorporated into Warsaw in 1938. The Warsaw University of Life Sciences campus was established in 1956, and further expanded in the following decades. In the 1960s and 1970s, the housing estates of Służew Fort, Służew nad Dolinką, and Służewiec-Prototypy were developed in the area. In 1995, the Służew station of the Warsaw Metro was opened.

== Toponomy ==
The name Służew comes from the archaic Polish word służ, an equivalent to modern służyć, which means to serve. It came from the fact, that historically the area was inhabited by serfs, peasants who served the local noble families. Until the 16th century, the settlement was known as Służewo. It also inspired the name of the nearby neighbourhood of Służewiec, as well as the historic name of Wolica, formerly known as Wola Służewska.

== History ==
=== Until the 20th century ===
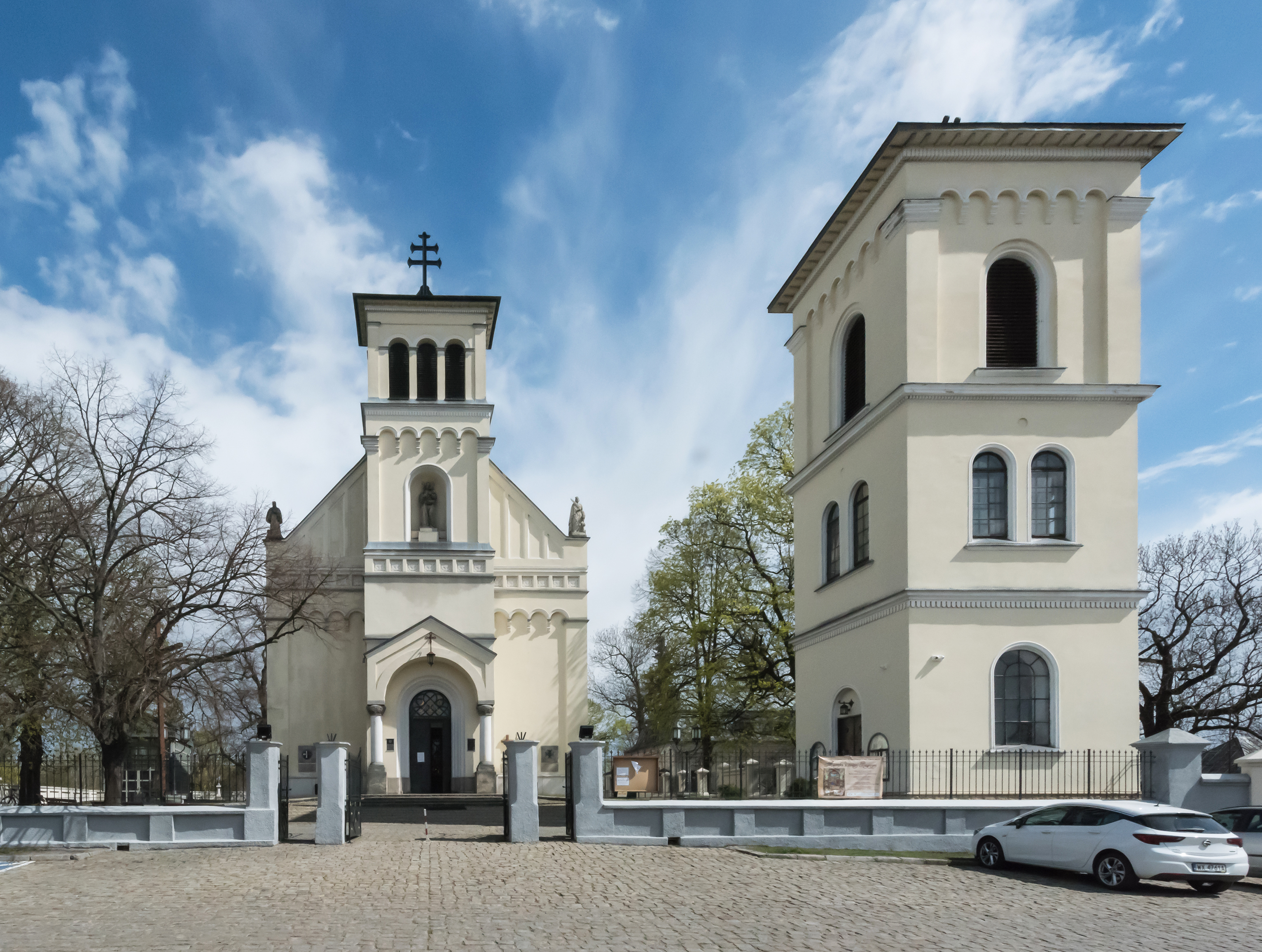
The St. Catherine Church, dating to 1848. Its parish was established in 1238 as the first within modern Warsaw.

Signs of human settlements from the Stone Age (4000 BCE and 2000 BCE), Bronze Age (3300 BCE to 1200 BCE), and of the Lusatian culture (1300 BCE to 500 BCE) have been found in the area of Warsaw Escarpment and Służewiec Stream.

By 1065, the area was inhabited by the Catholic monks of the Order of Saint Benedict, who founded there their missionary centre. In 1238, the Catholic Parish of St. Catherine was founded by duke Konrad I of Masovia, ruler of the Duchy of Masovia, and erected by bishop Paweł II of Bnin. It is the oldest parish within modern boundaries of Warsaw. At the same time, the Służew Old Cemetery was also founded nearby. Archaeological findings suggest that before that, it was a place of worship of Slavic pagans, with signs of fire burning constantly for several hundred years. It is unknown what the first church built there looked like. In the 13th century, a wooden church was built in its place, and was later replaced with a brick structure in the 16th century.

By 1238, the village of Służewo (later known as Służew), was placed near Sadurka stream (with Służewiec Stream currently being its only remainder), and owned by the Catholic Order of Canon Regulars of St. Augustin from Czerwińsk nad Wisłą. In 1240, it was acquired by duke Konrad I of Masovia, who then gifted it to his knight and count, Gotard of Służew, on 27 April 1245. His descendants became the Służewiecki family of the Radwan heraldic clan, who owned this land until the 17th century. The village came into prosperity in the 16th century thanks to selling its grain to Gdańsk. At the end of the 17th century, the village was bought by king John III Sobieski, and incorporated into the Wilanów Estate. In the following decades, Służew changed owners numerous times. Among them was nobleman August Aleksander Czartoryski, who expanded the agricultural estate of Służew, and financed the rebuilding of the St. Catherine Church in 1742. The template was later again rebuilt in 1848, in the Romanesque Revival style.

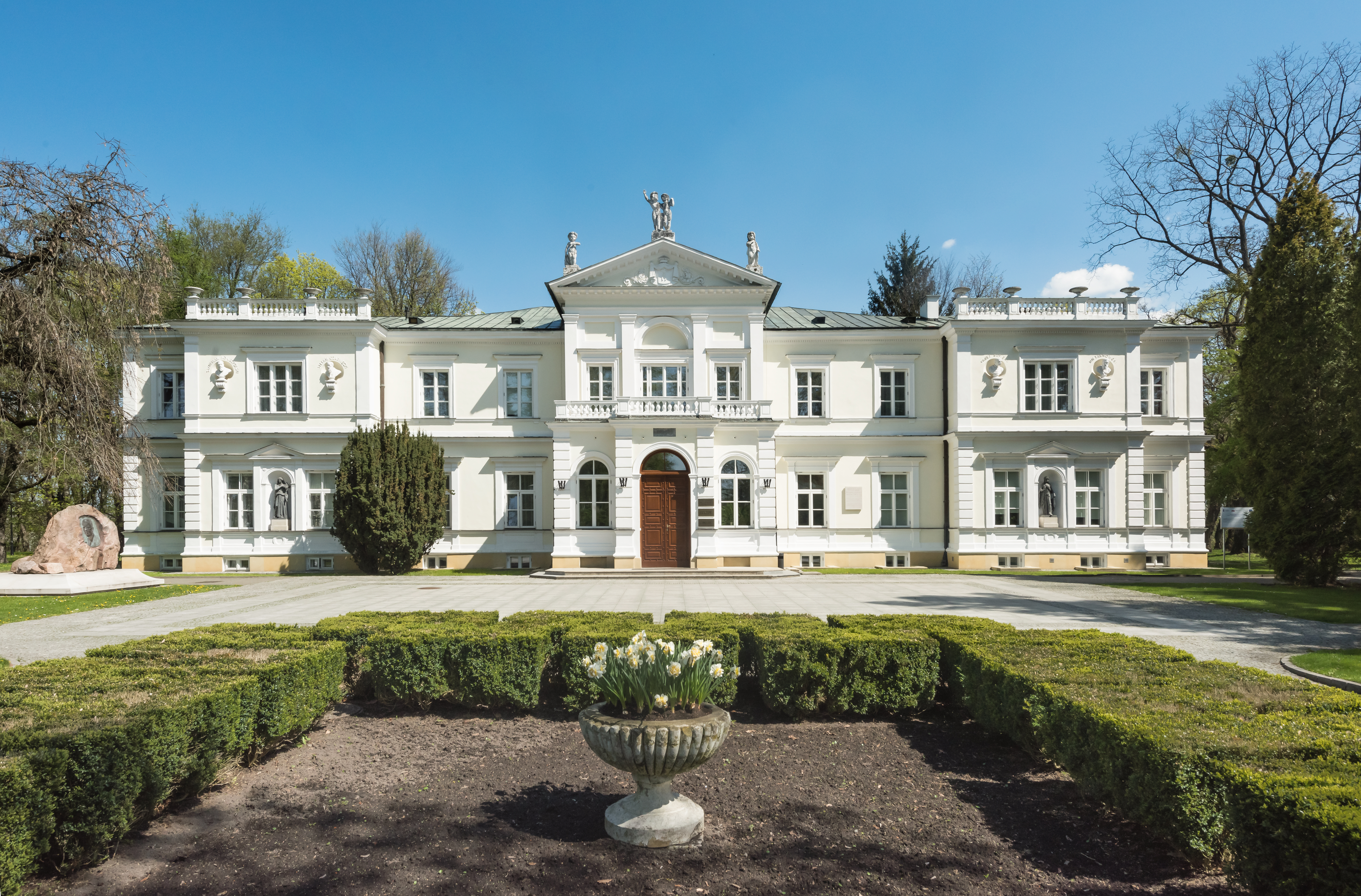
The Krasiński Palace, built in 1860.

In 1776, the Krasiński Palace was built near Służew. It was commissioned by princess Elżbieta Izabela Lubomirska as a gift for her daughter Aleksandra Lubomirska, and son-in-law Stanisław Kostka Potocki. In 1822, it became the property of Julian Ursyn Niemcewicz, who organised a library there collecting rare and valuable books. He renamed his estate after his family cognomen to Ursynów, which later inspired the name of the modern city district of Ursynów. The palace was rebuilt in 1860 in the Renaissance Revival style. In 1857, it was acquired by the Krasiński family. Its last owner, Edward Bernard Raczyński donated it to the Ministry of Religious Affairs and Public Education in 1921.

Between 1818 and 1821, Stanisław Kostka Potocki established the Gucin residence near the St. Catherine Church. Following his death in 1821, his wife, Aleksandra Lubomirska founded there the garden complex of Gucin Grove, which was developed between 1821 and 1830. At the turn of the 19th century, there were also built catacombs.

In 1853, near the village, the Yellow Tavern, was opened at the current 204 Wilanowska Avenue. It operated until the beginning of the 20th century under the name Belle-Vue, until it went bankrupt, and the building begun being used for various purposes, including as a dog husbandry, and for housing. In 1966, it was nationalised in an effort to protect it as cultural property, and in 1984, the Museum of the Polish Peasant Movement was opened inside. Currently, the building is located outside the boundaries of Służew, within the City Information System area of Ksawerów.

In 1864, following the abolition of serfdom in Poland, 44 households received a combined land of 342 ha. On 13 January 1867, Służewiec became part of the rural municipality of Wilanów, established as part of the administrative reform in the Kingdom of Poland.

In 1886, two forts, designated as VIIA and VIII, were built near Służew as part of the series of fortifications of the Warsaw Fortress, erected around Warsaw by the Imperial Russian Army. They were decommissioned in 1909, and partially demolished in 1913.

=== Early 20th century and the Second World War ===
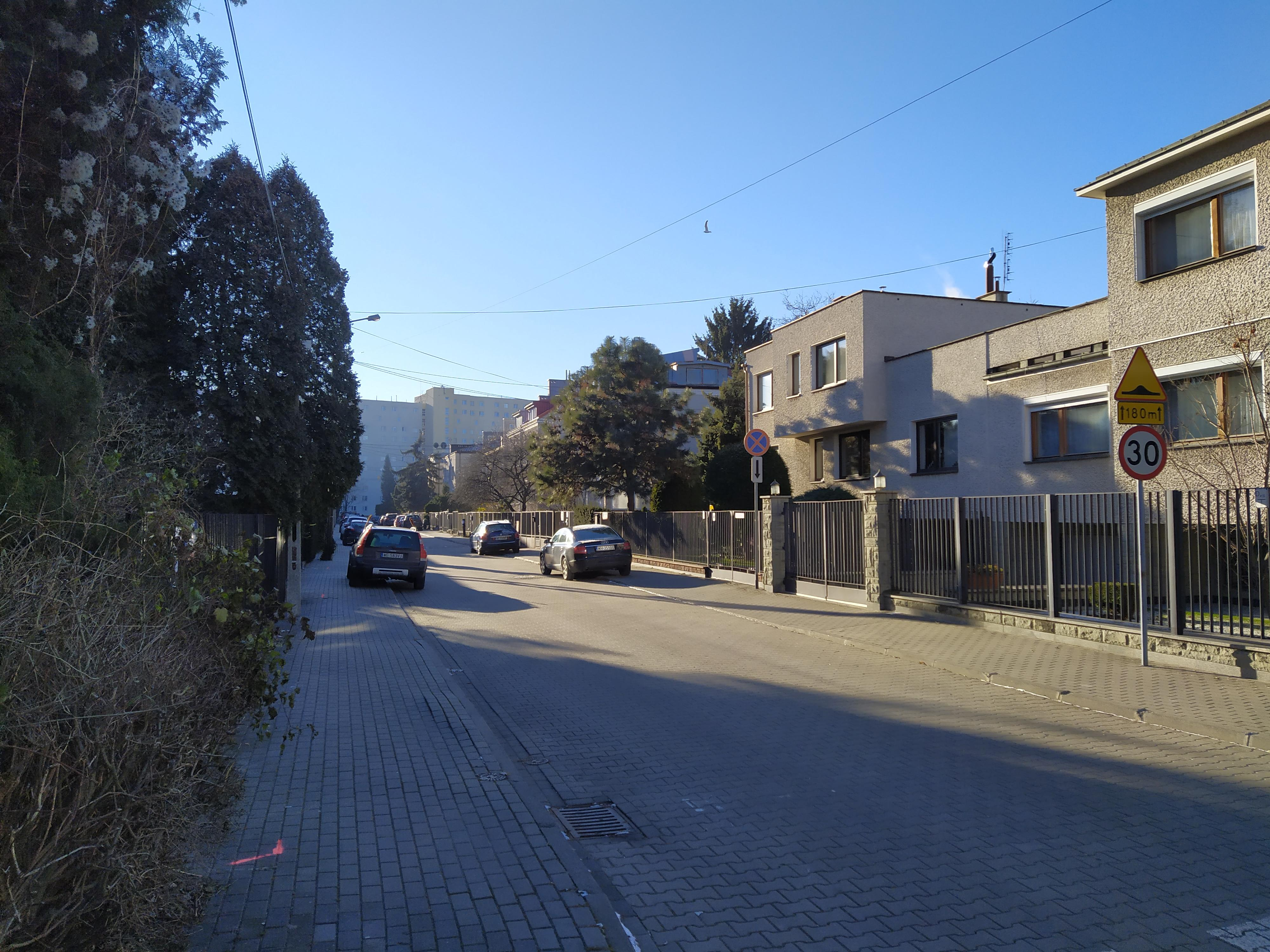
Houses at Wernyhory in Służew-Parcele.

In 1900, the Służew New Cemetery was founded at Wałbrzyska Street, as an extension of the Służew Old Cemetery.

In 1921, the village had 151 inhabitants and 11 households.

In 1932, around 275 ha of farmland to the northwest of Służew was divided and sold out for housing construction. The area was developed into a neighbourhood of villas, known as Służew-Parcele, placed on the axis of Wałbrzyska Street. The Służew Square, surrounded by townhouses, was also developed to the south, at the corner of Puławska and Wałbrzyska Streets. The area became an exclusive neighbourhood for the city's elite, including high-ranking members of the government and military, politicians, businesspeople, and scientists. The villas were designed by numerous noteworthy architects, in various styles, such as Art Deco, modernism, and Polish manor house.

In 1937, the St. Joseph Monastery of the Dominican Order, was built in Służew, at 2 Dominikańska Street. In the 1950s, half of its land was confiscated by the government, and to protect the rest, it was turned into the St. Dominic Church, becoming the seat of a parish which encompassed Służew. A new church building was opened in 1994.

The area was incorporated into Warsaw on 27 September 1938.

In 1939, the Służewiec Racecourse was built at 266 Puławska Street, located to the southeast of Służewiec, and to the west of Służew. Upon its opening, it became the largest and most modern horse racing venue in Europe, with its main circuit measuring 2,300 m. It began hosting the Great Warsaw Race, the most prestigious horse race in Poland. In 1938, the municipal tram network was extended towards the Służewiec Racecourse with tracks built alongside Puławska Street, ending with a turning loop at the current intersection of Dolina Służewiecka and Rzymowskiego Streets. The race track is currently located within the boundaries of the North Ursynów.

On 1 August 1944, during the German occupation in the Second World War, a group of civilians was rounded up in Służew, and executed at the nearby Służewiec Racecourse. It was done in retaliation for the unsuccessful attack on the location, organised earlier that day by the Polish resistance, as part of the Warsaw Uprising. Some time later, most of the houses in Służew-Parcele were set on fire by German officers in retaliation for the uprising.

=== Communist period ===
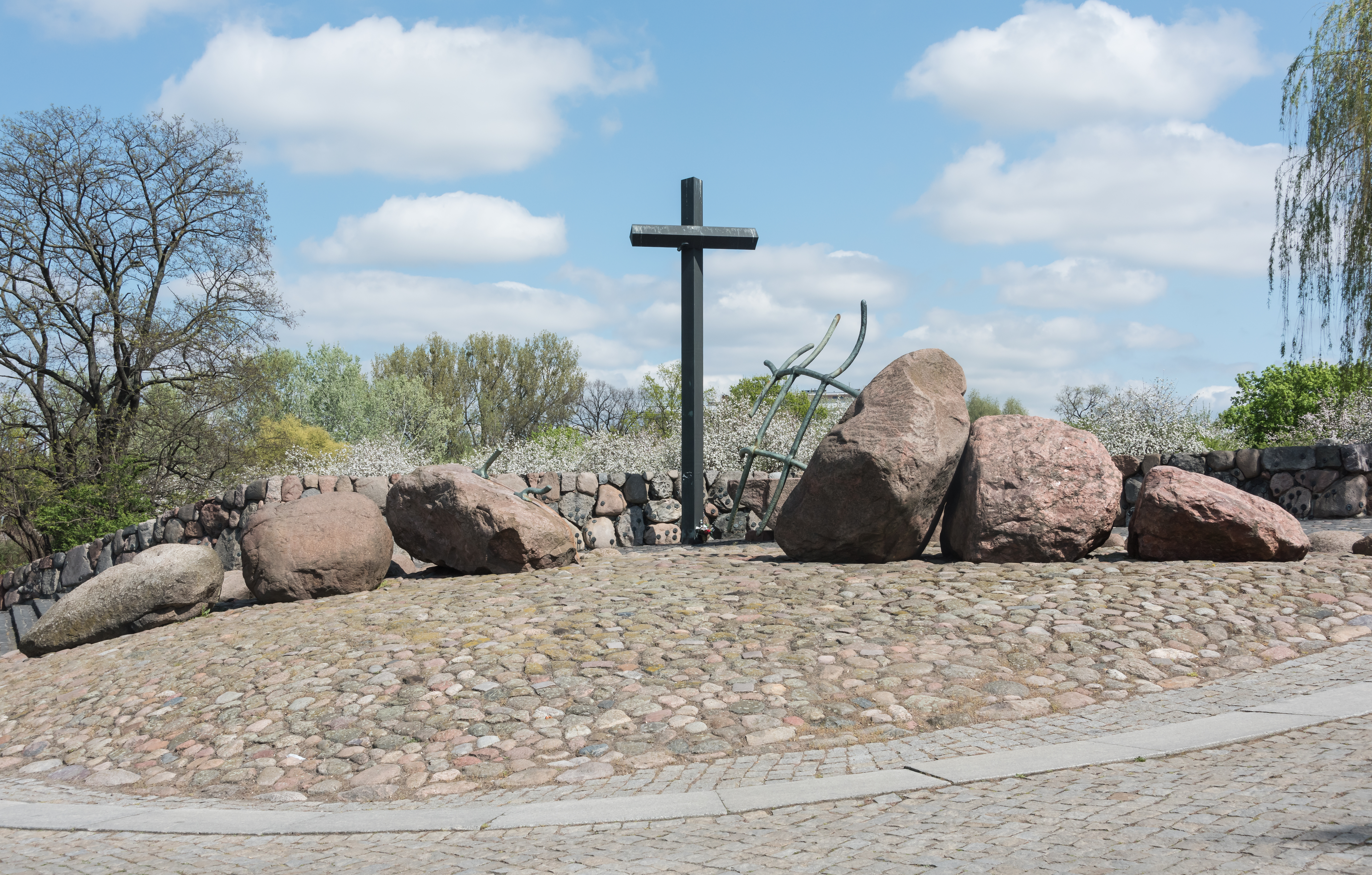
The memorial to the political prisoners murdered in the 1940s by the Security Office, and buried near the St. Catherine Church.

Between 1945 and 1947, the bodies of political prisoners murdered in the Mokotów Prison, were buried in unmarked graves near the St. Catherine Church and the Służew New Cemetery, by the Security Office. It is estimated that around two thousand people were laid there. They were later exhumed and moved to the nearby Służew Old Cemetery. In 1993, the Memorial to the Communist Terror Martyrs of 1944–1956 was unveiled, commemorating the victims.

In 1953, the Institute of Physics of the Polish Academy of Sciences was founded with headquarters at 32 and 46 Lotników Avenue. It is a research facility focused on solid-state and atomic physics. In 1966, the Institute of Electronic Technologies was also founded with headquarters in the same building complex. In 2020, it was joined with the Institute of Electronic Technologies and Materials, forming the Łukasiewicz Institute of Microelectronics and Photonics, which researches advanced materials, micro- and nanoelectronics and photonics.

In 1956, the Council of Ministers gave a plot of land in Służew, as well as in nearby Natolin, Wilanów, and Wolica to the Warsaw University of Life Sciences. The acquired area included the Krasiński Palace and a vocational school near Nowoursynowska Street, which were adopted into the university campus. It was further developed with new faculty buildings throughout the 1960s and 1970s. In 1989, the Krasiński Palace became the seat of the university authorities. Between 1999 and 2002, it was expanded with the construction of a new campus, which became one of the most technologically advanced in Europe. In 2003, all remaining faculties and institutions of the university were moved to the campus. Since 1983, the university hosts annually the Ursynalia, one of the largest music festivals in Poland.

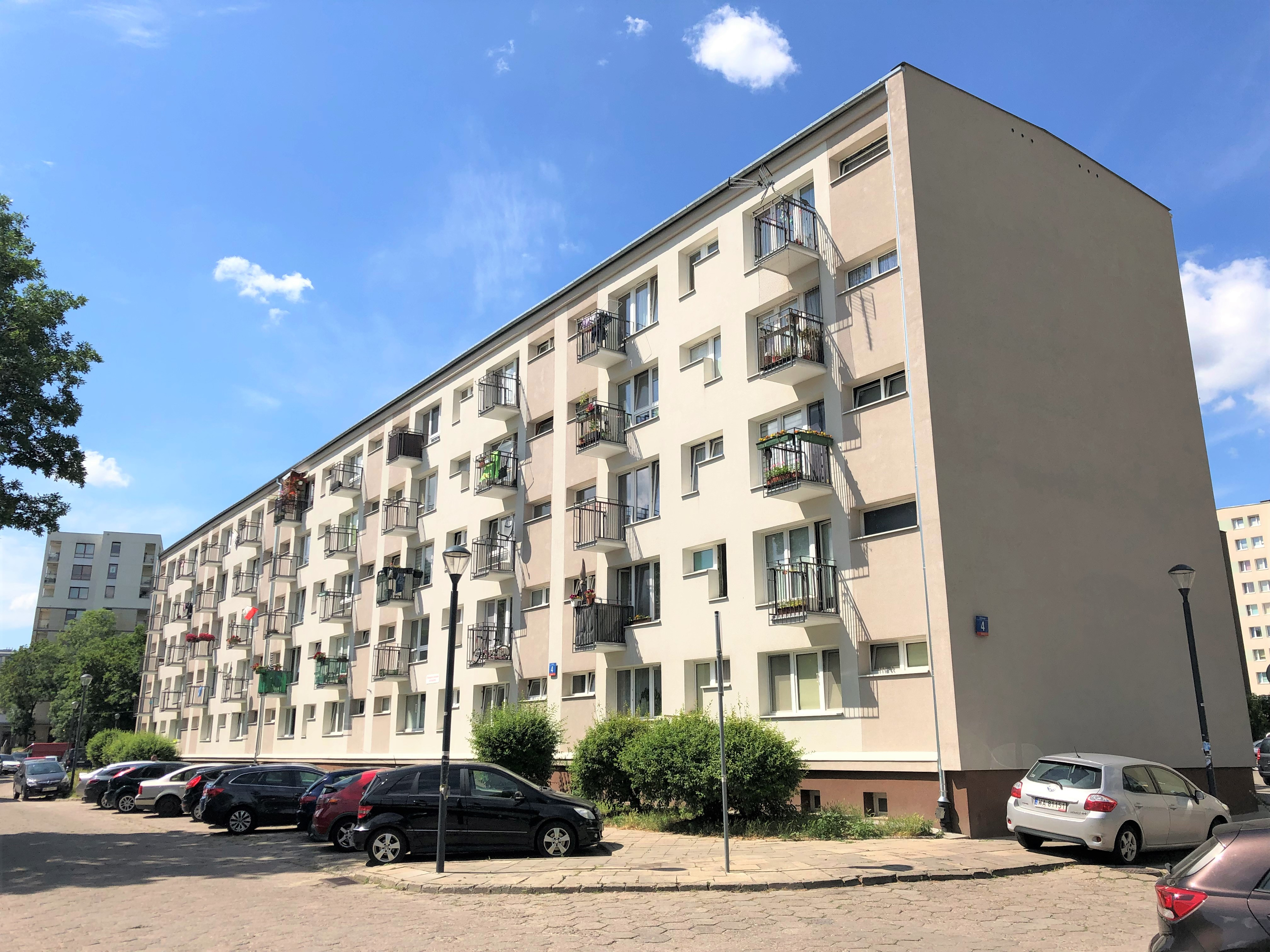
One of the multifamily residential buildings of Służewiec-Prototypy, built in the 1960s.

Between 1960 and 1965, the housing estate of Służewiec-Prototypy, was built to the northwest of the historic neighbourhood, between Lotników Avenue, Modzelewskiego Street, Bokserska Street, and Obrzeżna Street, with Rzymowskiego Street as its main axis. Consisting of high-rise multifamily buildings, the neighbourhood was constructed as a test ground for new technologies and urbanist solutions, such as various large-panel-system building techniques. The observation of various types of building during and after their construction was intended to allow for the improvement of new projects, comparison of existing ones and implementation of cost-reducing solutions. It was the first and the largest research ground of its kind in Poland. The neighbourhood was designed with modernist apartment buildings. The neighbourhood was intended to provide housing for the employees of numerous factories in the nearby industrial district, located within walking distance of it.

Between 1972 and 1979, two more housing estates were developed in the area. This included Służew Fort, located between Wilanowska Avenue, Puławska Street, and Lotników Avenue, and Służew nad Dolinką, between Kmicica, Wałbrzyska, Nowoursynowska, Łukowa, and Dolina Służewska Streets. They consisted of mid- and high-rise multifamily residential buildings constructed in the large-panel-system technique. Additionally, the Służew Little Valley Park was developed nearby, alongside Służewiec Stream, and Dolina Służewska Street.

In 1978, the Faculty of Management of the University of Warsaw was moved to two buildings at 1 and 3 Szturmowa Street. It was the first university faculty in Poland dedicated to the management education. The campus was expanded with third building opened in 2002, with the former two being renovated between 2004 and 2005.

In the 1970s, a neighbourhood of single-family housing for the officers of the Polish People's Army was also constructed around Fort VIII. In 1981, concrete-enforced trenches were built in the fort.

The St. Maximilian Maria Kolbe Church, which belongs to the Catholic denomination, was constructed at 35 Rzymowskiego Street between 1979 and 1988.

=== Democratic period ===
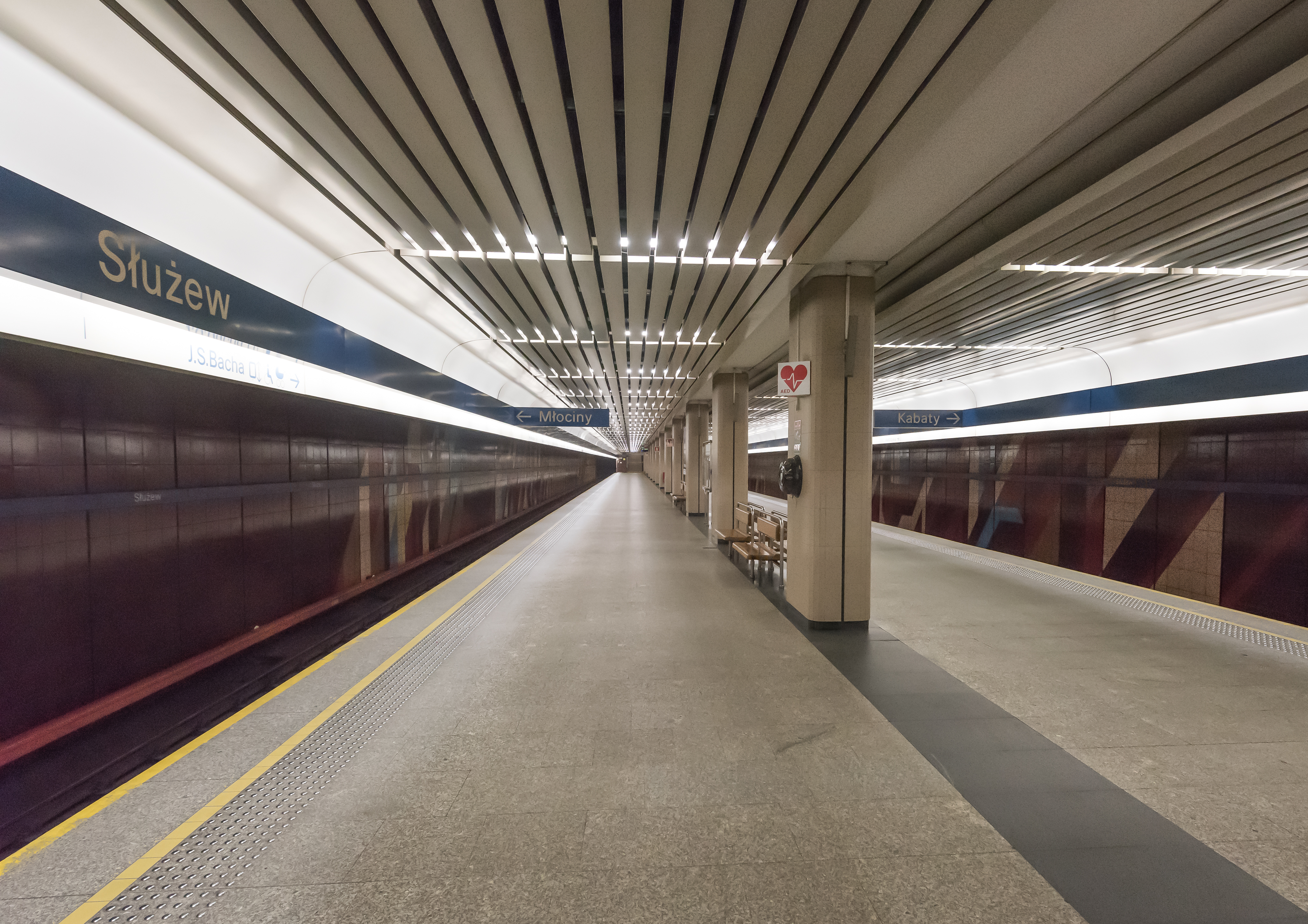
The Służew metro station, opened in 1995.

In 1994, Służew was divided into two parts, separated by the Dolina Służewiecka Street. The southeastern, historical part of the neighbourhood became a part of the municipality of Warsaw-Ursynów, while the rest to the northwest, a part of the municipality of Warsaw-Centre. In 1998, both municipalities were divided into areas of the City Information System, with the north becoming Służew, and south, Stary Służew (known as Stary Ursynów until 2000). In 2002, the municipalities were replaced by the city districts of Mokotów in the north and Ursynów in the south. In 2001, two neighbourhoods governed by locally elected councils were founded in the area. They were Służewiec Fort, including the neighbourhood of Służew Fort and the Institute of Physics of the Polish Academy of Sciences, and Służewiec Południowy (South Służewiec), which consisted of Służewiec-Prototypy, and the southern portion of Służewiec Przemysłowy. Służewiec Fort was abolished in 2016.

In 1995, the Służew station of the M1 line of the Warsaw Metro rapid transit underground system, was opened at the intersection of Harcerzy Rzeczypospolitej Avenue, Rolna Street, and Wałbrzyska Street.

In 1996, the Ursynów Escarpment Nature Reserve, was established in the woodland and swamp on the Warsaw Escarpment, northeastern portion of Stary Służew.

In 1999, the shopping mall Land was opened at 11 Wałbrzyska Street. Currently, it is planned to be demolished and replaced with an office building.

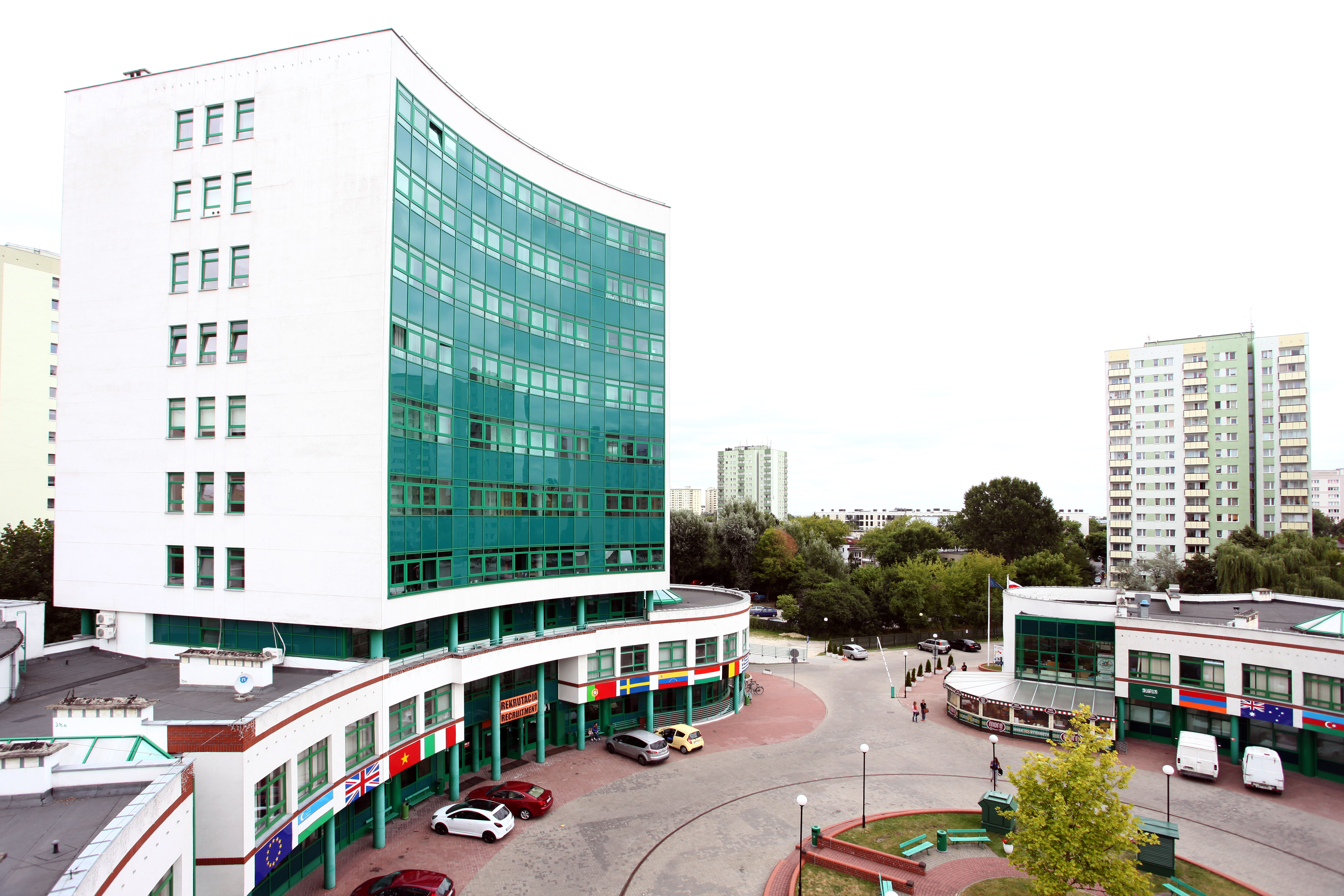
The campus of the Łazarski University, built in 2002.

In 2002, the campus of Łazarski University was opened 43 Świeradowska Street.

In 2005, the Polish Audiovisual Publishing House was founded as a subdivision of the Ministry of Culture and National Heritage, with the headquarters at 3 and 5 Wałbrzyska Street. In 2009, it was restructured into the National Audiovisual Institute, tasked with the digitisation, sharing and promotion of Polish audiovisual heritage. In 2017, it was joined with the National Film Archive, forming the National Film Archive and Audiovisual Institute, which is one of the largest archives of film and audio in Europe.

In 2014, the Służew House of Culture community centre was opened at 15 Bacha Street, near the Służewiec Pond. The modernist complex was designed to resemble a small village, with several wooden pavilions including amenities such as several rooms, amphitheatre, play area, and a barn with animals. Before its opening, the community centre was housed in repurposed cargo containers used since 1993. In 2015, the World Peace Bell was unveiled nearby. It was a copy of the artwork from 1989, displayed at 55 Bukowińska Street, which was stolen in 2002. The original was one of 50 identical bells, gifted by Hiroshima and Nagasaki in Japan, two places destroyed in 1945 atomic bombings, to numerous cities across the globe, as a symbol of world peace.

In 2019, the Fort VIII was renovated, and turned into a shopping centre. A privately owned recreational green area, known as the Eighth Park (Polish: Ósmy Park), was also opened nearby. Additionally, several multifamily residential buildings were constructed to the north of it.

== Housing and economy ==
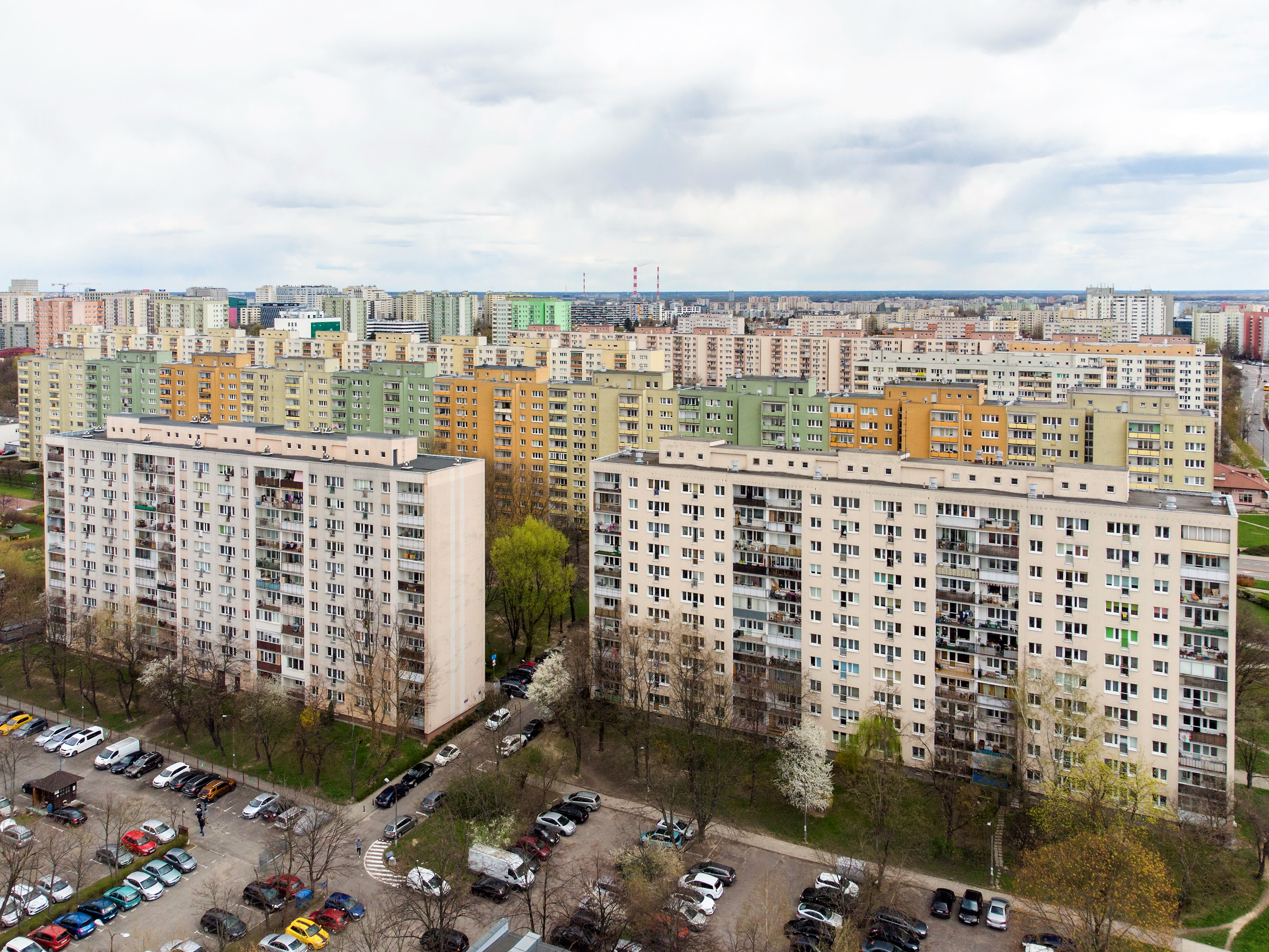
The apartment buildings in Służew-Fort.

The neighbourhood features several large mid- and high-rise housing estates with apartment buildings, including Służew Fort, located between Wilanowska Avenue, Puławska Street, and Lotników Avenue; Służew nad Dolinką, between Kmicica, Wałbrzyska, Nowoursynowska, Łukowa, and Dolina Służewska Streets; Służewiec-Prototypy, between Lotników Avenue, Modzelewskiego Street, Bokserska Street, and Obrzeżna Street; and a neighbourhood at the corner of Nowoursynowska Street and Dolina Służewska Street. Additionally, the area also has several low-rise neighbourhoods with detached and semi-detached single-family houses. This includes Służew-Parcele, between Puławska Street, Wilanowska Avenue, Dominikańska Street, and Wałbrzyska Street; Stary Służew, between Fosa Street, Nowoursynowska Street, Arbuzowa Street, and Warsaw Escarpment; and the eastern portion of Służew Fort.

Służew also features two shopping centres, Land at 11 Wałbrzyska Street, and Fort 8, at 1B Fort Służew Street. The latter was adopted from the 18th-century decommissioned fortifications.

== Higher education and science ==
Służew includes the research complex at 32 and 46 Lotników Avenue, which houses the Institute of Physics of the Polish Academy of Sciences focused on solid-state and atomic physics, and Łukasiewicz Institute of Microelectronics and Photonics, focused on micro- and nanoelectronics and photonics. The neighbourhood also includes the campus of the Warsaw University of Life Sciences, centred on Nowoursynowska Street, as well as the Łazarski University at 43 Świeradowska Street, and the Faculty of Management of the University of Warsaw at 1 and 3 Szturmowa Street.

== Culture ==
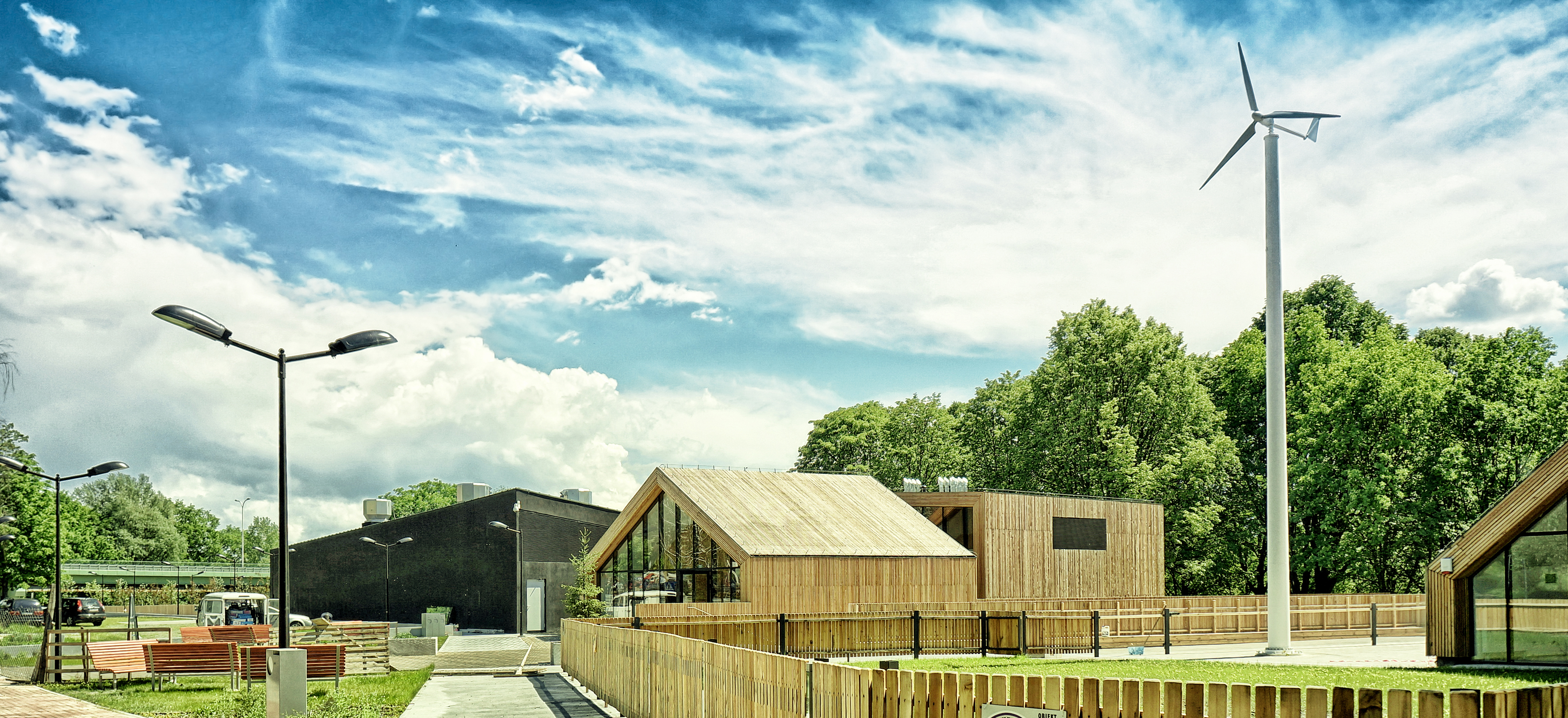
The Służew House of Culture.

The neighbourhood features the Służew House of Culture community centre at 15 Bacha Street. The modernist complex consists of several wooden pavilions and includes several rooms, amphitheatre, a play area, and a barn with animals. The World Peace Bell is also placed nearby. Unveiled in 2015, it is a copy of a 1989 bell gifted by Hiroshima and Nagasaki to the city, as a symbol of world peace, stolen in 2002. Additionally, the neighbourhood also includes the Monument to the 1944–1956 Communist Terror Martyrs by Maciej Szańkowski and Sławomir Korzeniowski, which is dedicated to the political prisoners executed by the Security Office between 1945 and 1956. It is placed near Fosa Street,

Several historical buildings are present in the area, including the St. Catherine Church from 1848, Krasiński Palace from 1860, and two decommissioned fortifications from 1886, designated as Fort VIIA Służewiec, and Fort VIII Służew. The National Film Archive and Audiovisual Institute, one of the largest archives of film and audio in Europe, is located at 3 and 5 Wałbrzyska Street.

Since 1983, the campus of the Warsaw University of Life Sciences hosts annually the Ursynalia, one of the largest music festivals in Poland.

== Parks and nature ==
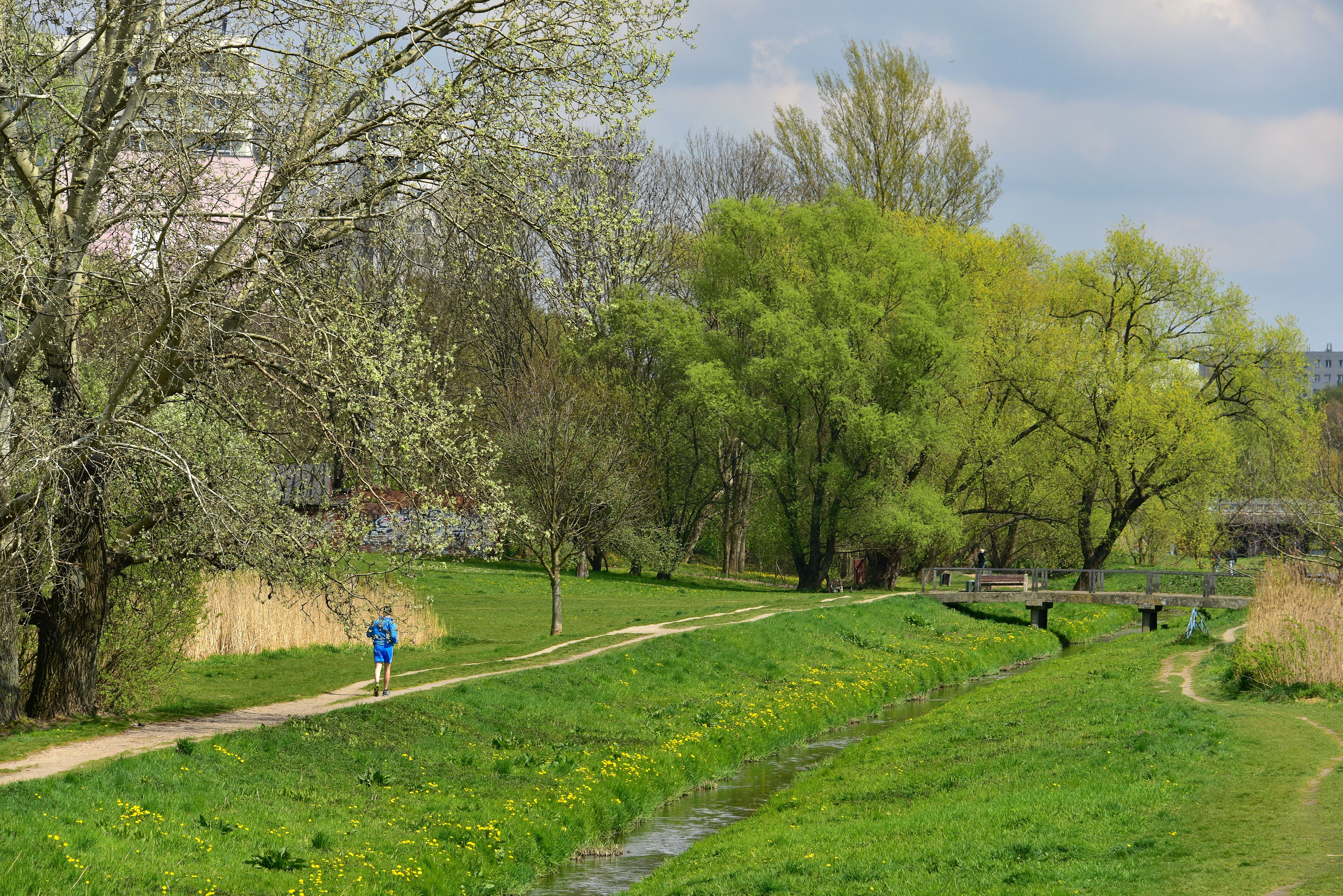
The Służewiec Stream in the Służew Little Valley Park.

The neighbourhood features a strip of green land, including Służew Little Valley Park and Służewiec Pond Park, stretching alongside Dolina Służewska Street. It is crossed by the Służewiec Stream, and features several lakes, with the Służewiec Pond being the largest among them. The southeastern portion of Służew also includes the Ursynów Escarpment Nature Reserve, which consists of a woodland and swamp on the Warsaw Escarpment. There are also the historical remains of the Gucin Grove garden complex, including the catacombs. Moreover, a small private green area, known as the Eighth Park, is also placed next to the Fort VIII.

== Transport ==
The neighbourhood features the Służew station of the M1 line of the Warsaw Metro rapid transit underground system, placed at the intersection of Harcerzy Rzeczypospolitej Avenue, Rolna Street, and Wałbrzyska Street.

== Religion ==
The neighbourhood has three Catholic churches. This includes the St. Catherine Church at 17 Fosa Street, which was built in 1848, and is the seat of the oldest parish in Warsaw, dating to 1238. The others are St. Maximilian Maria Kolbe Church at 35 Rzymowskiego Street, and the St. Dominic Church at 2 Dominikańska Street. The latter is also adjusted to the St. Joseph Monastery of the Dominican Order, built in 1937. Additionally, the neighbourhood includes the Old and New Cemeteries, located respectively on Fosa and Wałbrzyska Streets. Moreover, the Kingdom Hall of Jehovah's Witnesses is located in Służew at 48 Wałbrzyska Street.

== Location and subdivisions ==
The neighbourhood is divided into two City Information System areas: Służew in the west, within the Mokotów district, and Stary Służew (Old Służew) in the east, within the Ursynów district.

The boundaries of Służew are approximately determined by Wilanowska Avenue to the north; Dolina Służewska Street, Wyścigowa Avenue, and Bokserska Street to the south; and Obrzeżna Street to the west.

The boundaries of Stary Służew are approximately determined by Dolina Służewiecka Street to the north, Wilanowska Avenue, Fosa Street, Służewiec Stream, Arbuzowa Street, and around campus of the Warsaw University of Life Sciences, to the east; Ciszewskiego Street to the south; and Jana Rodowicza "Anody" Avenue and around possessions on Chłapowskiego Street to the west.

The eastern part of the area is included within the neighbourhood of Służewiec Południowy (South Służewiec), governed by a locally elected council. It also contains the southern half of the nearby Służewiec. The area of Służew contained within said neighbourhood is located between Wilanowska Avenue, Lotników Avenue, Puławska Street, Dolina Służewska Street, Bokserska Street, Wyścigowa Street, and Obrzeżna Street.

Additionally, traditionally, Służew is sometimes also divided into two areas separated by the Warsaw Escarpment. They are Służew Górny (Upper Służew) in the west, and Służew Dolny (Lower Służew) in the east.
