= Służew Cemetery =

Służew Cemetery may refer to the:

- Służew Old Cemetery at the Renety Street in Warsaw, Poland
- Służew New Cemetery at the Wałbrzyska Street in Warsaw, Poland
