= Służew-Parcele =

Neighbourhood in Warsaw, Poland

- Neighbourhood
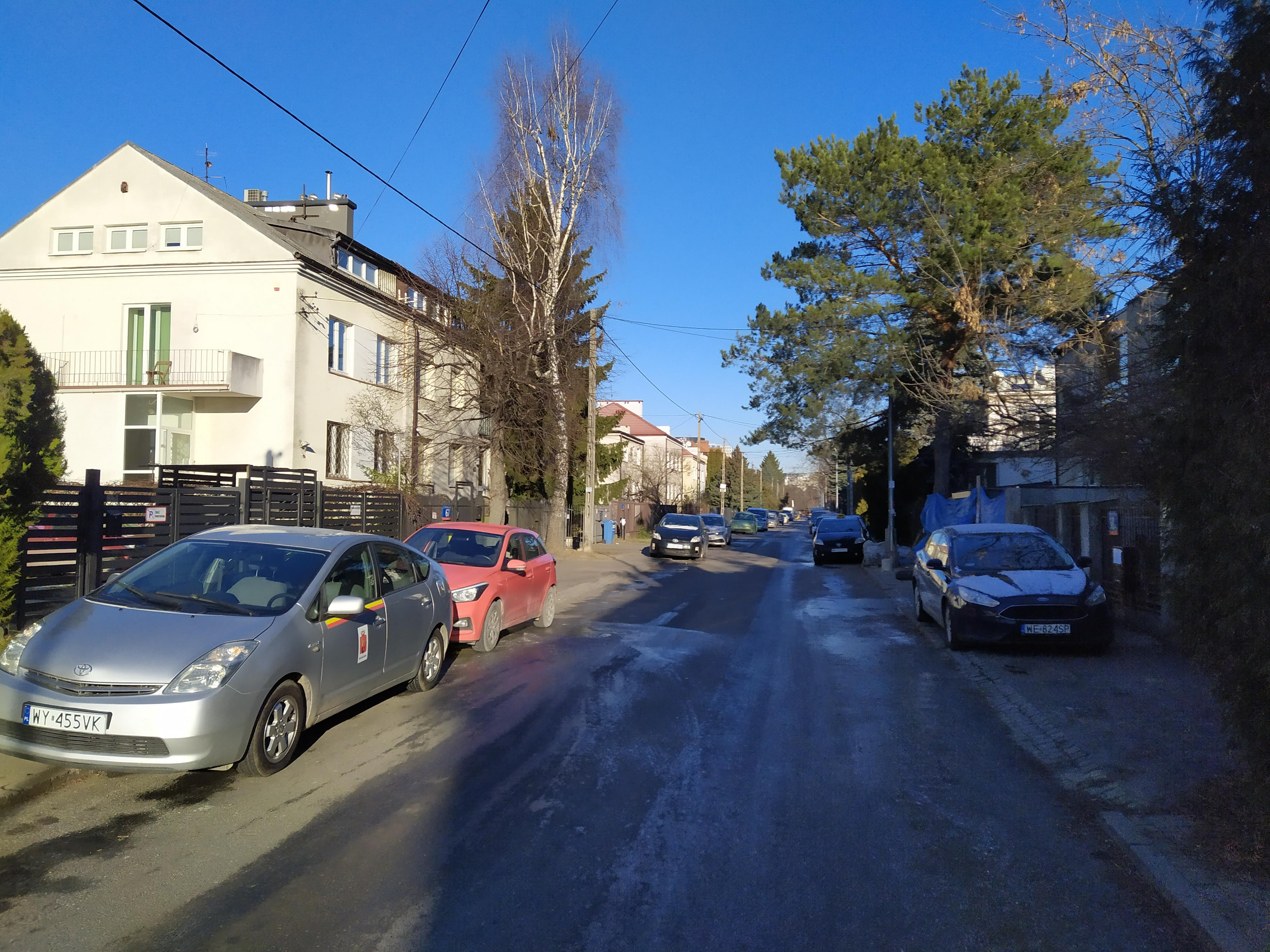
- The houses at Wołodyjowskiego Street in 2021.
- Interactive map of Służew-Parcele
- Coordinates: 52°10′34″N 21°01′36″E
- Country: Poland
- Voivodeship: Masovian
- City and county: Warsaw
- Districts: Mokotów
- City Information System areas: Służew
- Time zone: UTC+1 (CET)
  - Summer (DST): UTC+2 (CEST)
- Area code: +48 22

Służew-Parcele (Polish: [ˈswu.ʐɛf parˈt͡sɛ.lɛ]) is a neighbourhood in Warsaw, Poland, located within the Mokotów district, and within the City Information System area of Służew. It is a low-rise residential area with detached and semi-detached single-family houses. The neighbourhood was founded in 1932, and incorporated into the city in 1938.

== Toponomy ==
The name Służew comes from the archaic Polish word służ, an equivalent to modern służyć, which means to serve. It from the fact that historically, the area was inhabited by serfs, peasants who served the local noble families. Word Parcele translates to Polish word parcels, referring to the neighbourhood being founded by dividing farmlands into parcels for housing developments.

== History ==
In 1932, around 275 ha of farmland to the northwest of the village of Służew was divided and sold out for housing construction. The area was developed into a neighbourhood of villas, known as Służew-Parcele, placed on the axis of Wałbrzyska Street. The Służew Square, surrounded by townhouses, was also developed to the south, at the corner of Puławska and Wałbrzyska Streets. The area became an exclusive neighbourhood for the city's elite, including high-ranking members of the government and military, politicians, businesspeople, and scientists. The villas were designed by numerous noteworthy architects, in various styles, such as Art Deco, modernism, and Polish manor house.

In 1937, the St. Joseph Monastery of the Dominican Order, was built to the east of the neighbourhood, at 2 Dominikańska Street. In the 1950s, half of its land was confiscated by the government, and to protect the rest, it was turned into the St. Dominic Church, becoming the seat of a parish which encompassed Służew. A new church building was opened in 1994.

The area was incorporated into Warsaw on 27 September 1938.

In 1944, while under the German occupation in the Second World War, most of the houses in Służew-Parcele were set on fire by German officers in retaliation for the Warsaw Uprising.

The area of the Służew Square was demolished as part of the construction of the nearby housing estate of Służewiec-Prototypy between 1960 and 1965.

In 1995, the Służew station of the M1 line of the Warsaw Metro rapid transit underground system, was opened to the south of the neighbourhood, at the intersection of Harcerzy Rzeczypospolitej Avenue, Rolna Street, and Wałbrzyska Street.

== Overview ==
Służew-Parcele is a low-rise residential area with detached and semi-detached single-family houses. It is located Puławska Street, Wilanowska Avenue, Dominikańska Street, and Wałbrzyska Street. The Służew station of the M1 line of the Warsaw Metro rapid transit underground system, is placed to the south, at the intersection of Harcerzy Rzeczypospolitej Avenue, Rolna Street, and Wałbrzyska Street. To the east from the neighbourhood is also placed the St. Dominic Church and the St. Joseph Monastery of the Dominican Order, at 2 Dominikańska Street.
