= Służew Little Valley Park =

Urban park in Warsaw, Poland

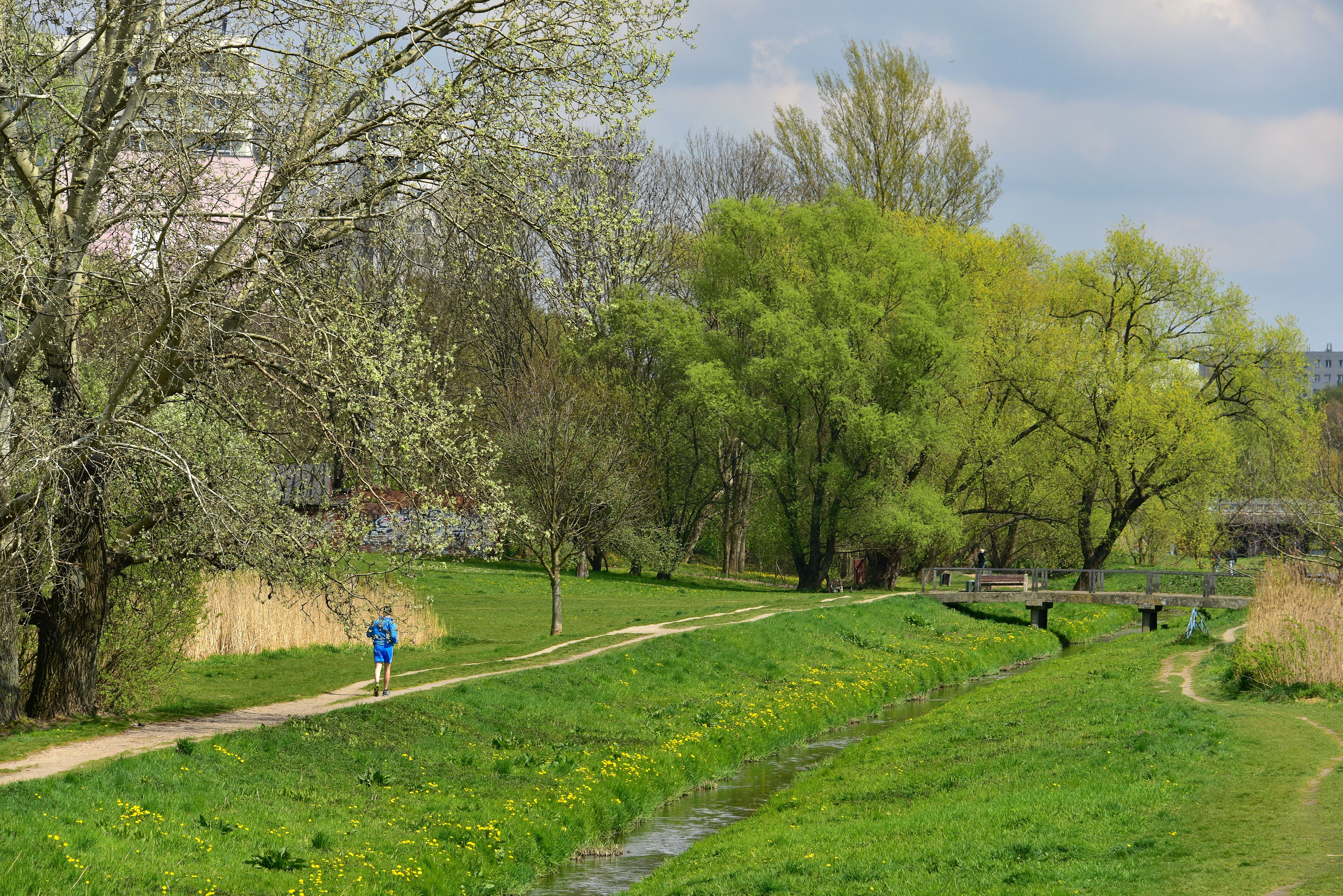
- The park in 2019.
- Interactive map of Służew Little Valley Park
- Type: Urban park
- Location: Mokotów, Warsaw, Poland
- Coordinates: 52°10′07″N 21°01′52″E
- Area: 22.8 hectares (56 acres)
- Created: 1970s
- Designer: Longin Majdecki

The Służew Little Valley Park (Polish pronunciation: [ˈswu.ʐɛf]; Polish: Park Dolinka Służewska) is an urban park in Warsaw, Poland. It is located in the neighbourhood of Służew, within the district of Mokotów, between Bacha Street, Wilanów Avenue, Puławska Street, and Dolina Służewiecka Street. The park was opened in the 1970s.

== History ==
The park was designed by Longin Majdecki and constructed in tandem with the nearby neighbourhood of Służew nad Dolinką in the 1970s. The land occupied by the park was previously farmland for the village of Służew. Some of the village's original structures survives to the present day near the Tarniny Street.

In 2013, the Służew Community Centre was opened within the park.

== Characteristics ==
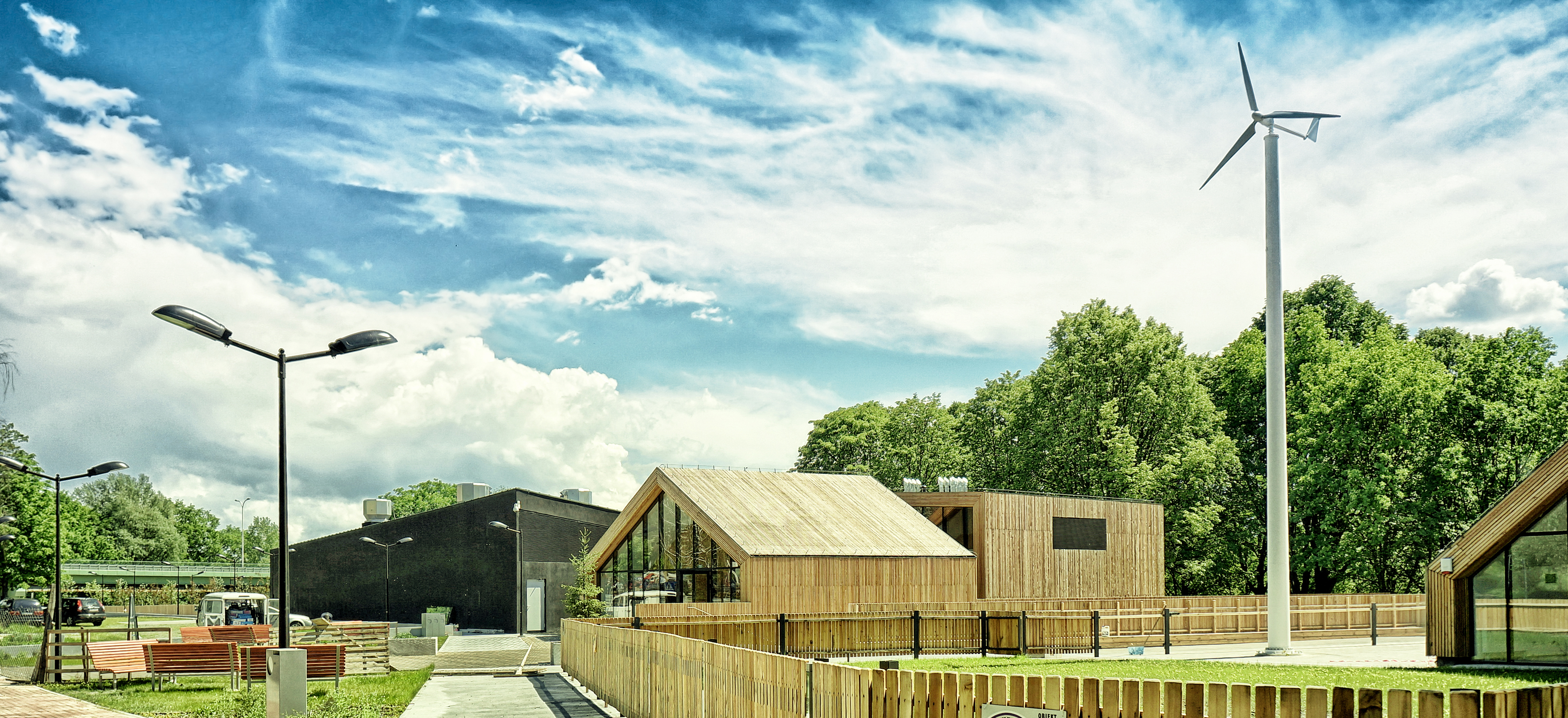
The Służew Community Centre in 2013.

The park is located in the neighbourhood of Służew, within the district of Mokotów, between Bacha Street, Wilanów Avenue, Puławska Street, and Dolina Służewiecka Street. It has the total area of 22.8 ha.

The park icnludes numerous ponds: Czarcie Oczko, Irysowy Dolny, Irysowy Górny, Kaczeńcowy Dolny, Kaczeńcowy Górn, Nenufarowe Ponds, Niezapominajki, and Parzydło. Additionally, Służewiec Stream also flows through the park.

In the park are also located the Służew Community Centre and the historical remains of some 20th Century farms.
