= Łazarski University =

Private university in Warsaw, Poland

- Akademia Łazarskiego
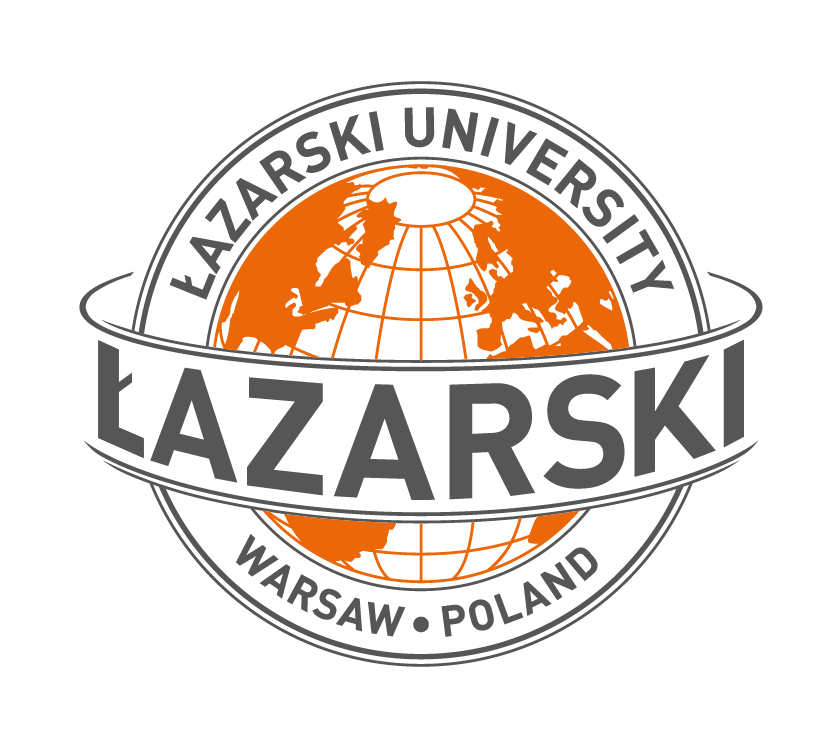
- Type: Private
- Established: 1993; 33 years ago
- President: Juliusz Madej
- Rector: Professor Maciej Rogalski
- Students: 3,782 (12.2023)
- Location: Świeradowska 43, 02-662 Warsaw, Poland; 52.1775°N 21.0157°E
- Campus: Urban
- Website: www.lazarski.pl

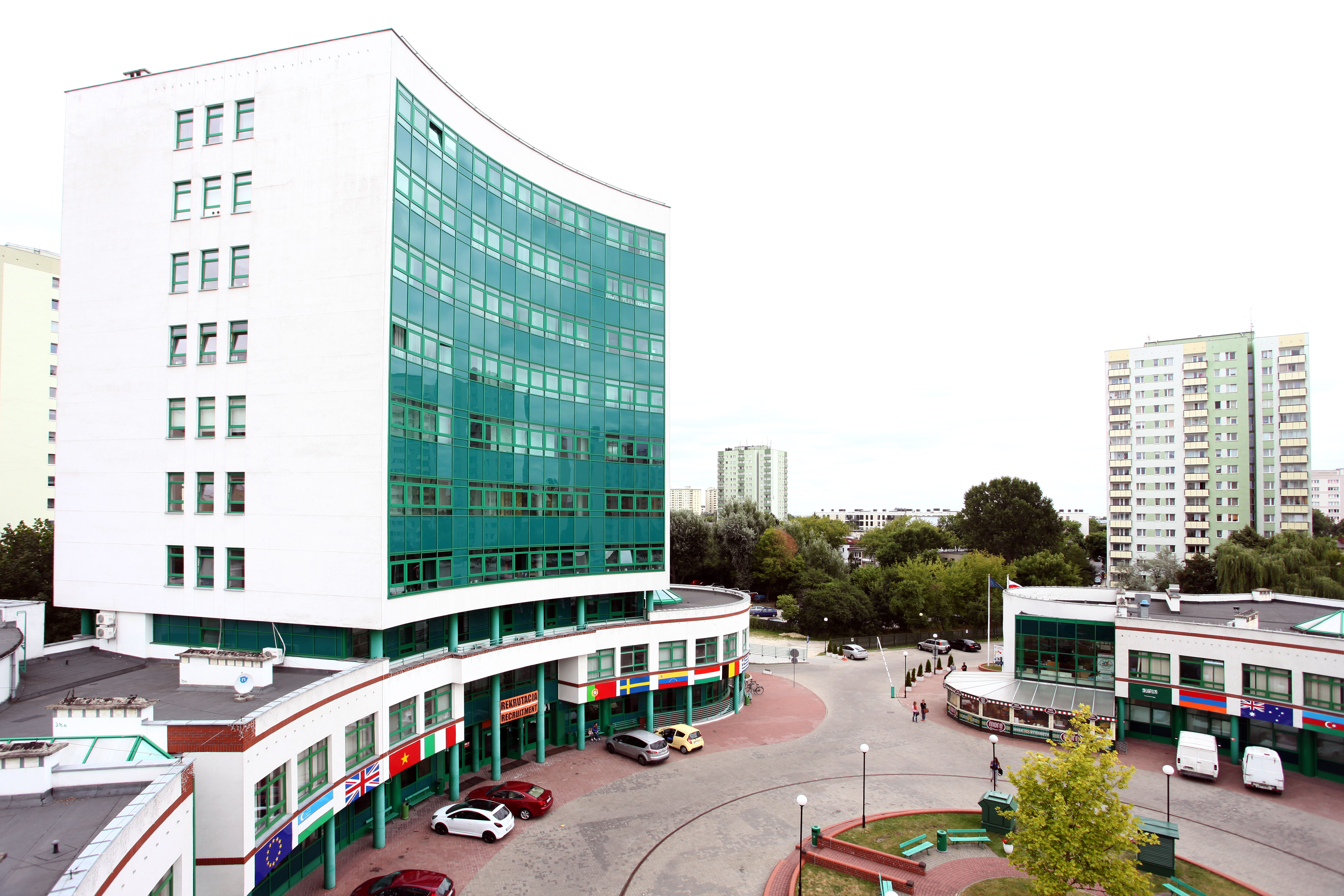
Campus

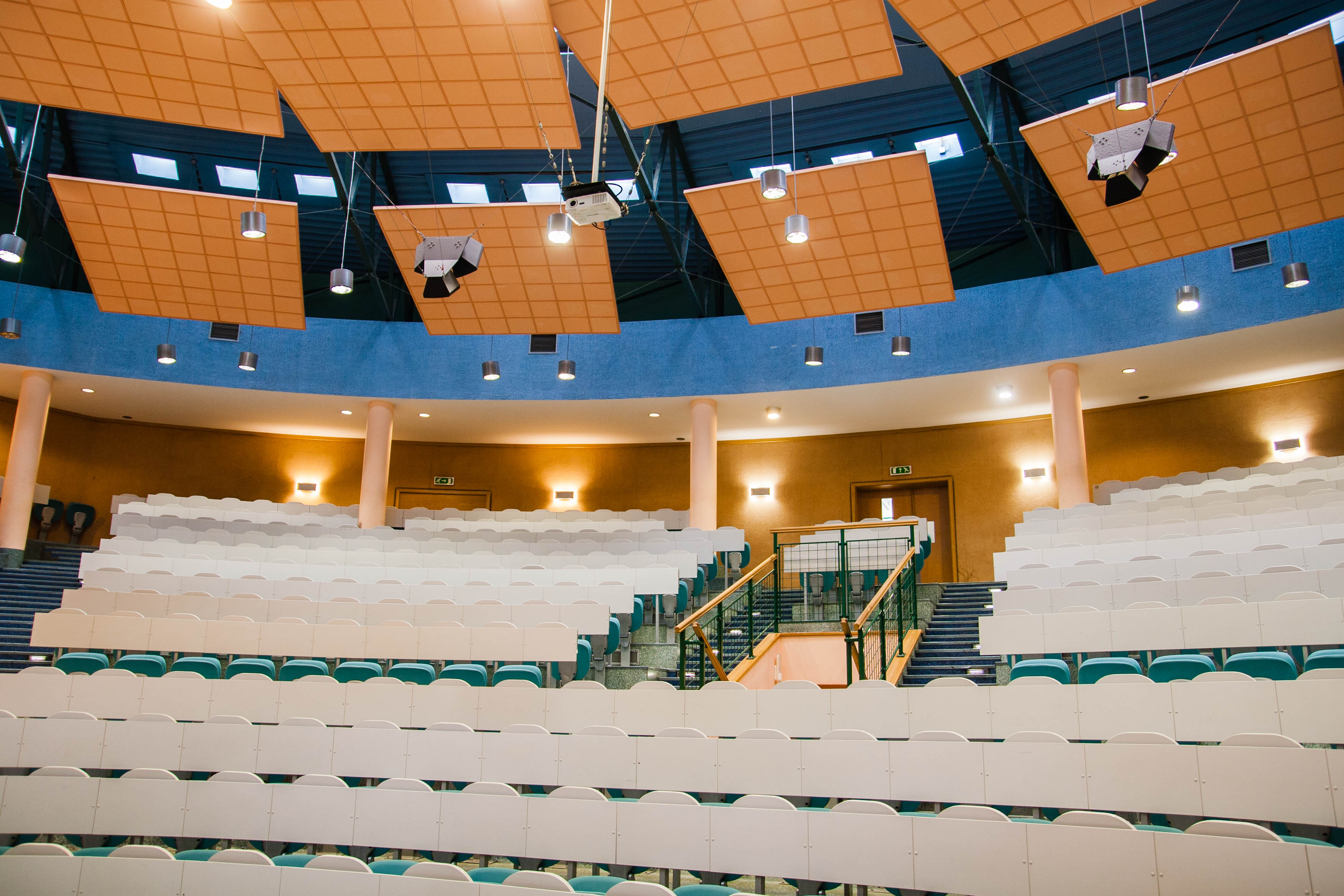
Lecture theatre

Łazarski University (Polish: Akademia Łazarskiego; formerly known as Ryszard Łazarski Higher School of Commerce and Law In Warsaw) is a private Polish university located in Warsaw, founded by Ryszard Łazarski in 1993.

The educational offer comprises studies at 3 faculties: the Faculty of Law and Administration, the Faculty of Economics and Management and the Faculty of Medicine. The university’s educational offer comprises BA studies, MA studies, doctoral studies in law, postgraduate studies, MBA, LLM, doctoral seminars, trainings and language courses. The university also offers studies in English, enabling to obtain the British degree of Coventry University.

The university educates lawyers, economists, business people, civil servants, politicians and diplomats. In 2017, it also started educating doctors at the Faculty of Medicine, as the second private university in Poland.

== History ==
- 1993 – Decision of the Minister of National Education, entitling the Founder, Ryszard Łazarski, PhD to establish a private university under the name Private Higher School of Commerce.
- 2000 – Death of the founder and rector of the Higher School of Commerce and Law, Ryszard Łazarski, PhD.
- 2000 – Change of the university’s name to Ryszard Łazarski Higher School of Commerce and Law.
- 2004 – Creation of the university-wide teaching unit, Postgraduate Education Centre.
- 2010 – Establishment of the Lazarski University Foundation, awarding scholarships to gifted students in need and supporting the local communities.
- 2010 – Inauguration of distance learning methods and techniques – Lazarski Distance Learning.
- 2010 – Change of name to Lazarski University.
- 2012 – Establishment of cooperation with the British Coventry University, introduction of validated English curricula resulting in the award of a double degree: a Polish one from Lazarski University, and a British one from Coventry University.
- 2015 – The Best Polish University in the international U-Multirank ranking elaborated at the request of the European Commission.
- 2015 – The Faculty of Economics and Management comes first in the Brief magazine rating measuring the graduates’ preparadeness to enter the labour market.
- 2017 – Commencement of educating doctors at the Faculty of Medicine.
- 2019 – Establishment of MexExcellence Medical Simulation Center.
- 2020 – Opening of the Air Simulator Center of the Lazarski University - Operator Goldwings Flight Academy.

== Academics ==
=== Faculties and majors ===
- Faculty of Economics and Management
  - economics
  - finance and accounting
  - international relations
  - management

The university also offers studies in English. A special programme conducted together with Coventry University in England awards students both a Polish and British degree.

- Faculty of Law and Administration
  - law
  - administration
  - law in business

The quality of education at the faculty was confirmed by the Polish Accreditation Commission which awarded a distinction to the law major. Students gain practice, among others, at the Student Law Clinic. The faculty features international law schools as well as LLM – the only studies in Poland educating lawyers from all over the world together with the Boston University and the Center for International Legal Studies in Salzburg. After graduation, a possibility exists to obtain subsequent degrees, such as the academic degree of the doctor of law in the field of law, the academic title of doctor habilitatus of jurisprudence in the field of law, as well as to initiate proceedings regarding the award of the scientific title of Professor by the President of the Republic of Poland.

- The Faculty of Medicine
  - medical studies
  - nursing

Lazarski University was the first private university in Warsaw, and the second one in Poland, to begin educating doctors. The internal education quality system was adapted to meet the requirements following from the reform of science and higher education. The Faculty features the Basic and Pre-Clinical Research Centre, comprising the Basic Medical Sciences Laboratory and the Morphological Sciences Laboratory.

=== Scholarly journals and publications ===
Lazarski University publishes two scientific magazines, featured in part B of the list elaborated by the Ministry of Science and Higher Education:

- Ius Novum (Faculty of Law and Administration)
- Myśl Ekonomiczna I Polityczna (Faculty of Economics and Management)

== Awards ==
=== Awards and rankings in 2017 ===
- Perspektywy – third position in the ranking among non-public MA-level universities.
- Dziennik Gazeta Prawna – the first position of the Faculty of Law and Administration in the non-public universities ranking.
- The Faculty of Law and Administration of Lazarski University was awarded the A category in the latest parametric assessment of scientific units.

=== Awards and rankings in 2018 ===
- Perspektywy – third position in the ranking among non-public MA-level universities.
- Two first prizes in the Genius Universitatis competition for a creative university recruitment campaign organised by the Perspektywy Publishing House: Grand Prix in the category: press advertisement supporting recruitment and Grand Prix in the category: recruitment website.

=== Awards and rankings in 2019 ===
- Perspektywy – third position in the ranking among non-public MA-level universities.
- Dziennik Gazeta Prawna – first position of the Faculty of Law and Administration in the non-public universities ranking.
- By the decision of the Polish Accreditation Committee, the field of medicine at the Faculty of Medicine of the Lazarski University was positively assessed.

=== Awards and rankings in 2020 ===
- Perspektywy – third position in the ranking among non-public MA-level universities.
- Dziennik Gazeta Prawna – first position of the Faculty of Law and Administration in the non-public universities ranking.
- Rzeczpospolita – third position of the Faculty of Law and Administration in the non-public universities ranking.

=== Awards and rankings in 2021 ===
- Dziennik Gazeta Prawna – first position of the Faculty of Law and Administration in the non-public universities ranking.

=== Awards and rankings in 2022 ===
- – first position of the Faculty of Law and Administration in the non-public universities ranking.

== Campus ==
The university is located at Świeradowska 43 in the Warsaw district of Mokotów. The campus is divided into six sectors (A, B, C, D, E, F) comprising teaching rooms, workshop rooms and lecture halls (the largest one, Lech Falandysz Lecture Hall, can accommodate 430 students). The building houses a library offering access to over 100,000 books, as well as to computer workstations. The university also has a Memorial Hall devoted to World War II and to the events during the Warsaw Uprising in which the founder of the university, Ryszard Łazarski – soldier of the “Baszta” (“Bastion”) Regiment of the Home Army – took part.

== Selected scientific centres and units ==
- Lazarski University Postgraduate Education Centre – unit dealing primarily with the education of persons holding at least first-degree studies diploma. It offers postgraduate studies, MBA and MPA programmes, trainings and consulting services for companies, institutions, public administration and local government units. It has many years’ experience in conducting programmes related, among others, to healthcare, judiciary, coaching, marketing, aviation and fashion industries, etc. The Centre is a partner for a number of enterprises and institutions with which it creates a joint consulting and training offer.
- Foreign Language Centre – teaching unit in charge of linguistic education. It conducts courses in 13 languages and acts as examination centre for the international examinations: TOEIC, TOLES and LCCI. The Centre organises courses for foreigners commencing studies in Poland or wishing to improve their Polish, as well as classes for students from outside the university. Since 2016, the Centre has been entitled to hold state examinations in Polish as a foreign language.
- Student Legal Clinic – entity comprising students and their supervisors – teachers and practitioners. The team provides legal consultancy free of charge to person in a difficult financial situation, draws up legal opinions, pleadings, etc. The Student Legal Clinic at the Lazarski University was the winner of the “Rzeczpospolita” 2018 ranking in the public and non-public university legal clinic category.
- Internship and Job Placement Division – entity in charge of shaping and supporting the professional development of the students and graduates of Lazarski University, as well as defining their personal and professional aptitudes. It conducts consulting and advisory activity, and organizes the annual Employer Fairs.
- Graduate Club – since 2009, the entity has associated and integrated the graduates of Lazarski University. It organises educational, cultural and social events, and assists in establishing business relations through cyclical networking meetings. It fosters professional success of the graduates, among others by organising the “Lazarski Diamonds” competition and by publicising their achievements.

== Student activity ==
A number of student organisations operate at the university: Student Government, Student Legal Clinic, academic societies, Lazarski University Academic Sports Association sections, cheerleader team. The students are initiators of cyclical events, among others:

- TEDx Lazarski University – a TED-licensed scientific conference, popularising interesting ideas and motivating to take new action.
- Przedsiębiorczość 3.0 (Entrepreneurship 3.0) – the final gala of the academic subject Studies and Research Methodology. First-year students elaborate and present their own business models based on a business model template.
- Warsaw Business Game – a competition during which teams from the top Warsaw universities solve a problem simulating a real-life business situation.
- Lazarski Talent Show – an event promoting the students’ talents and enabling them to find a wider audience.

== Sports ==
The students of the university participate in a number of sports events, including Academic Championships of Poland in basketball, football, judo, tennis, swimming etc. Lazarski University has its own gymnasium and a fully equipped exercise room. The Physical Education Centre at Lazarski University organises an annual event promoting sports and healthy lifestyle: Sports Day. The Centre is home to Lazarski University Academic Sports Association sections and to a cheerleader team. The university has a special e-learning studies mode programme for sportspeople. The students include successful sportspeople such as:

- Hubert Hurkacz – currently the best tennis player in Poland – 112th in the ATP ranking (2018), participant of French Open, Wimbledon and Australian Open tournaments,
- Weronika Deresz – rower, world championship medallist, participant of the Rio de Janeiro 2016 Olympic Games,
