= Służew New Cemetery =

Cemetery in Warsaw, Poland

Coordinates: 52°10′20″N 21°02′03″E

The Służew New Cemetery (Polish: Nowy cmentarz na Służewie) is a Roman Catholic cemetery in Warsaw's Mokotów district, Poland. The cemetery is located at Wałbrzyska Street. The cemetery was established in 1900.

From 30 June to 10 July 2014, the Institute of National Remembrance, the Council for the Protection of Struggle and Martyrdom and the Ministry of Justice carried out work as part of the research project "Searching for unknown burial places of victims of communist terror from 1944–1956". The exhumations were conducted under the supervision of Krzysztof Szwagrzyk.

== Notable burials ==
- Josepha Kodis
- Jerzy Kolendo
- Janusz Wójcik
