= Dąbrówka, Warsaw =

Neighbourhood of Warsaw, Poland

Dąbrówka
- Administrative neighbourhood (City Information System area)
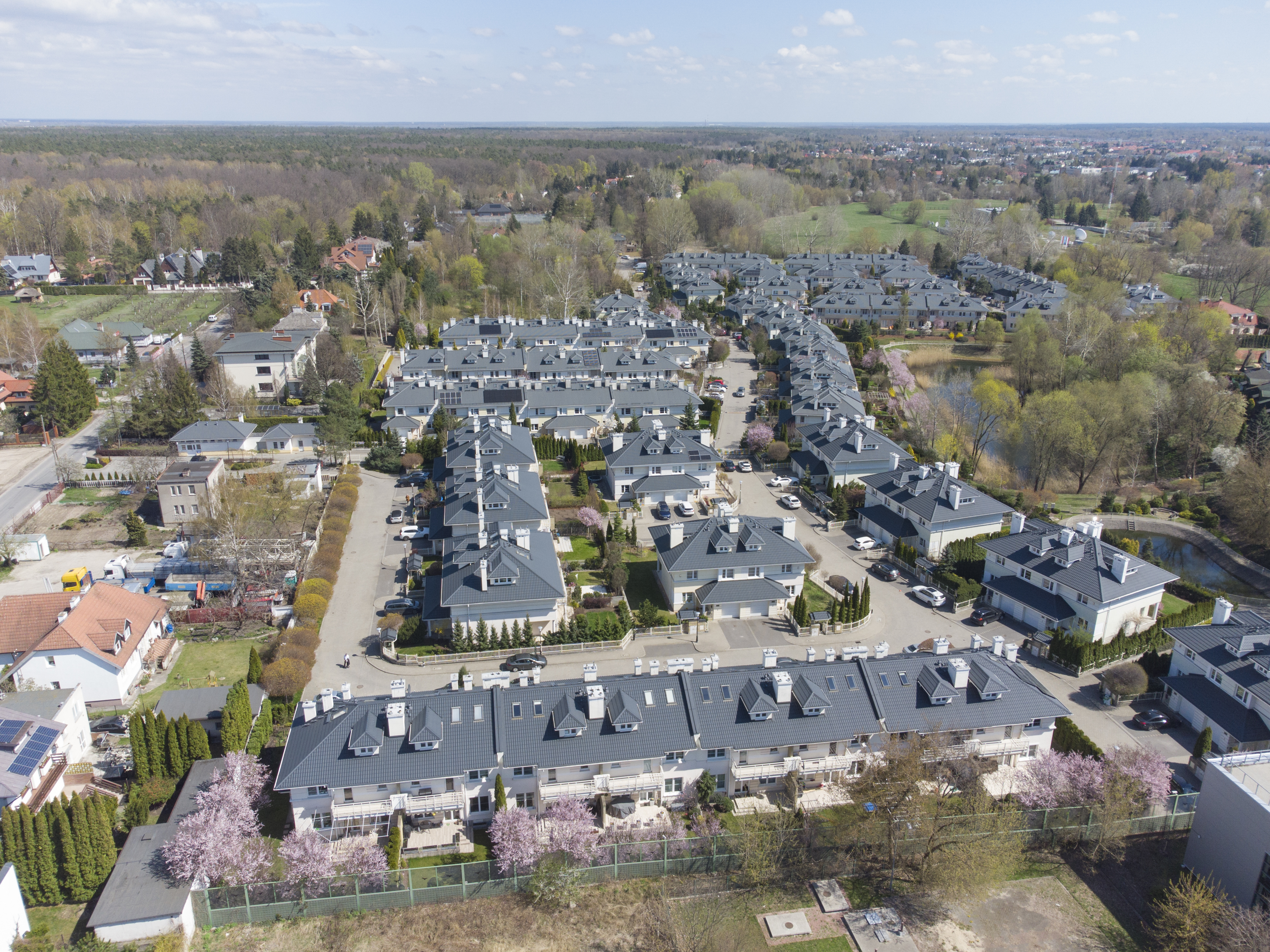
- The houses near Puławska Street.

- Location of Dąbrówka within Ursynów.
- Coordinates: 52°06′31″N 21°01′34″E
- Country: Poland
- Voivodeship: Masovian
- City and county: Warsaw
- District: Ursynów

Area
  - Total: 1.74 km^{2} (0.67 sq mi)
- Time zone: UTC+1 (CET)
  - Summer (DST): UTC+2 (CEST)

Dąbrówka (Polish: [dɔmˈbruf.ka]) is an administrative neighbourhood, and a City Information System area, in Warsaw, Poland, within the Ursynów district. It is a residential area, consisting of single-family housing.

The oldest known records of Dąbrówka come from 1422, when it was a small farming community. In 1898, in there were opened the Warszawa Dąbrówka Wąskotorowa narrow-gauge railway station operated by the Grójec Commuter Railway, and Stanisław Rostkowski's brick factory In the 1910s, in the area Rostkowski also founded a small settlement for his employees. Dąbrówka was incorporated into Warsaw in 1951.

== History ==
The oldest known records of Dąbrówka come from 1422, when it was a farming community, and a village inhabited by a petty nobility.

In 1898, the Warszawa Dąbrówka Wąskotorowa narrow-gauge railway station was opened near the current intersection of Puławska and Jagielska Streets. It was operated by the Grójec Commuter Railway, as part of the line between stations of Warszawa Mokotów and Nowe Miasto nad Pilicą. The station was closed down in 1971. It was located at Puławska Street, near current crossing with Jagielska Street.

On 24 June 1898, businessperson Stanisław Rostkowski opened a brick factory in Dąbrówka, which used nearby railway to export its products. In the 1910s, Rostkowski also founded a small settlement for his employees, and a small primary school. The brickworks industry left behind numerous clay pits in the area, which were later flooded, forming ponds, including: Głęboki Staw, Krzewiny, Glinianki pod Lasem, and Lipków Pond.

Dąbrówka was incorporated into the city of Warsaw on 14 May 1951.

In 1996, the administrative neighbourhood of Dąbrówka, governmened by an elected council, was established as a subdivision of the municipality of Warsaw-Ursynów, which was replaced by the Ursynów district in 2002. Its status was reconfirmed in 2013. In 1998, the district of Ursynów was subdivided into the City Information System areas, with Dąbrówka becoming one of them, sharing its boundaries with the administrative neighbourhood.

== Characteristics ==
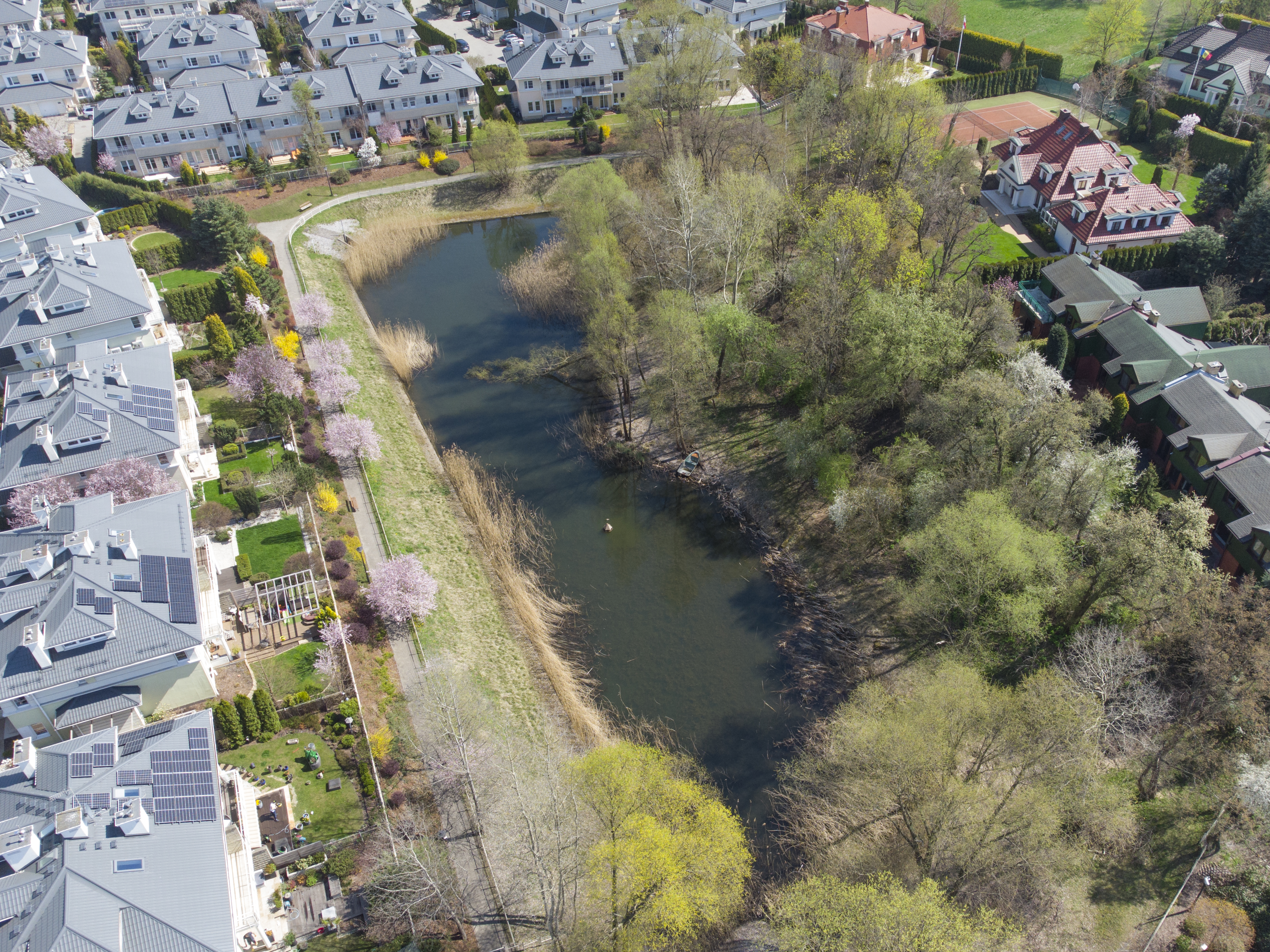
The Lipków Pond.

Dąbrówka is a municipal neighbourhood, and an area of the City Information System, located in the central south portion of the Ursynów district. It has total area of 1.74 km^{2} (0.672 sq mi), and is governed by a neighbourhood council, consisting of 9 elected officials. It is a residential area consisting of single-family housing.

The neighbourhood includes several manmade lakes, such as: Głęboki Staw, Glinianki pod Lasem, Krzewiny, and Lipków Pond.

== Location and boundaries ==
Dąbrówka is an administrative neighbourhood, and a City Information System area, located within the south-central portion of the Ursynów district. To the north, its boundary is determined by the Baletowa Street, Puławskska Street, and the parcels adjusted to the southern part of Tukana Street; to the north-east, by Kabaty Woods Nature Reserve; to the south by Kuropatwy Street, and the district border; and to the west, by Puławska Street, Karczunkowska Street, Sarabandy Street, Klarnecistów Street, and Farbiarska Street. The City Information System area borders Jeziorki Północne to the northwest, Pyry to the north, the Kabaty Woods Nature Reserve to the east, municipalities of Lesznowola, Piaseczno, and Konstancin-Jeziorna in Piaseczno County to the south, and Jeziorki Południowe to the south. The administrative neighbourhood additionally borders Pyry, and Jeziorki.
