= Ursynów =

City district of Warsaw, Poland

- City district
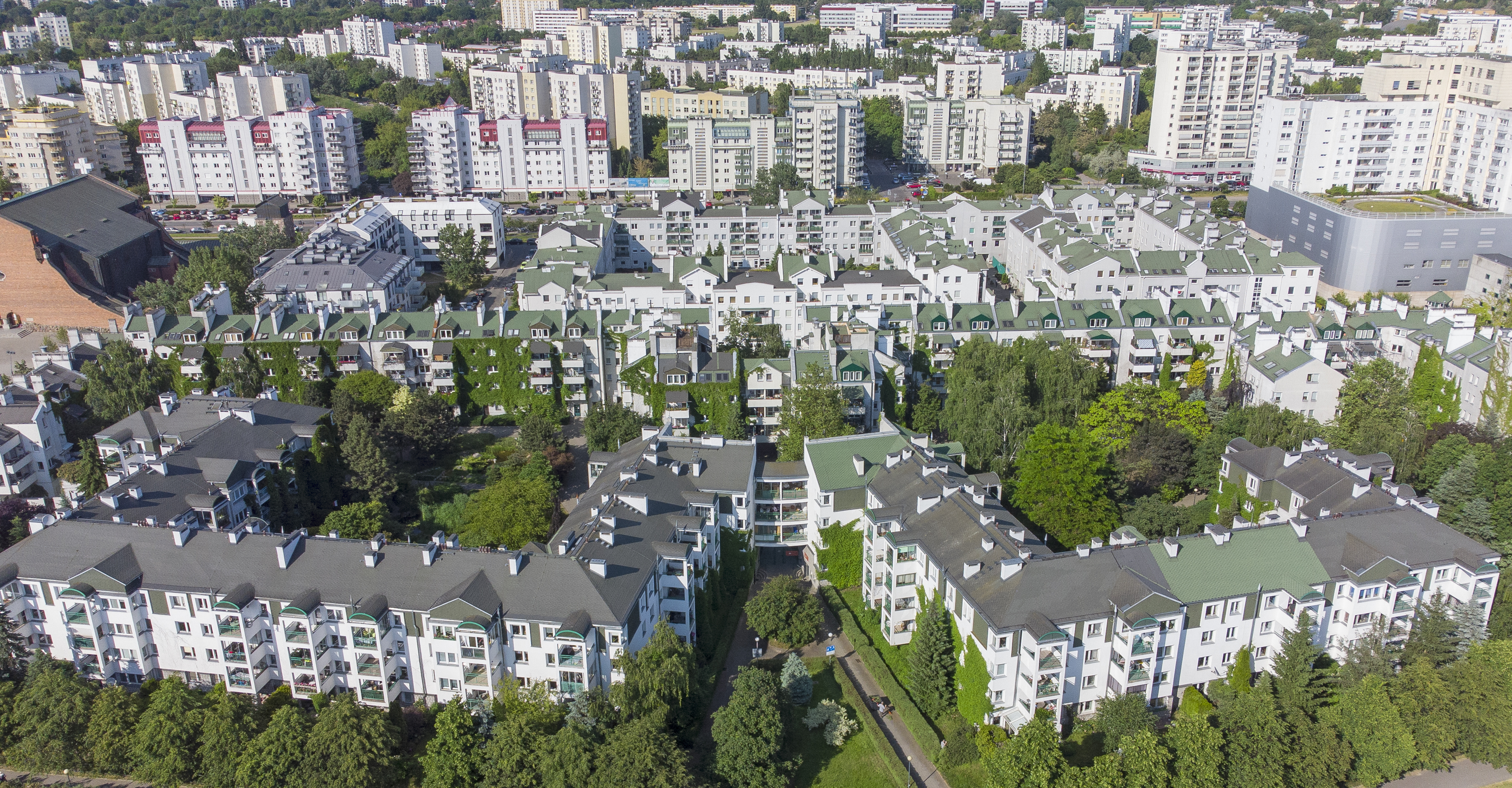
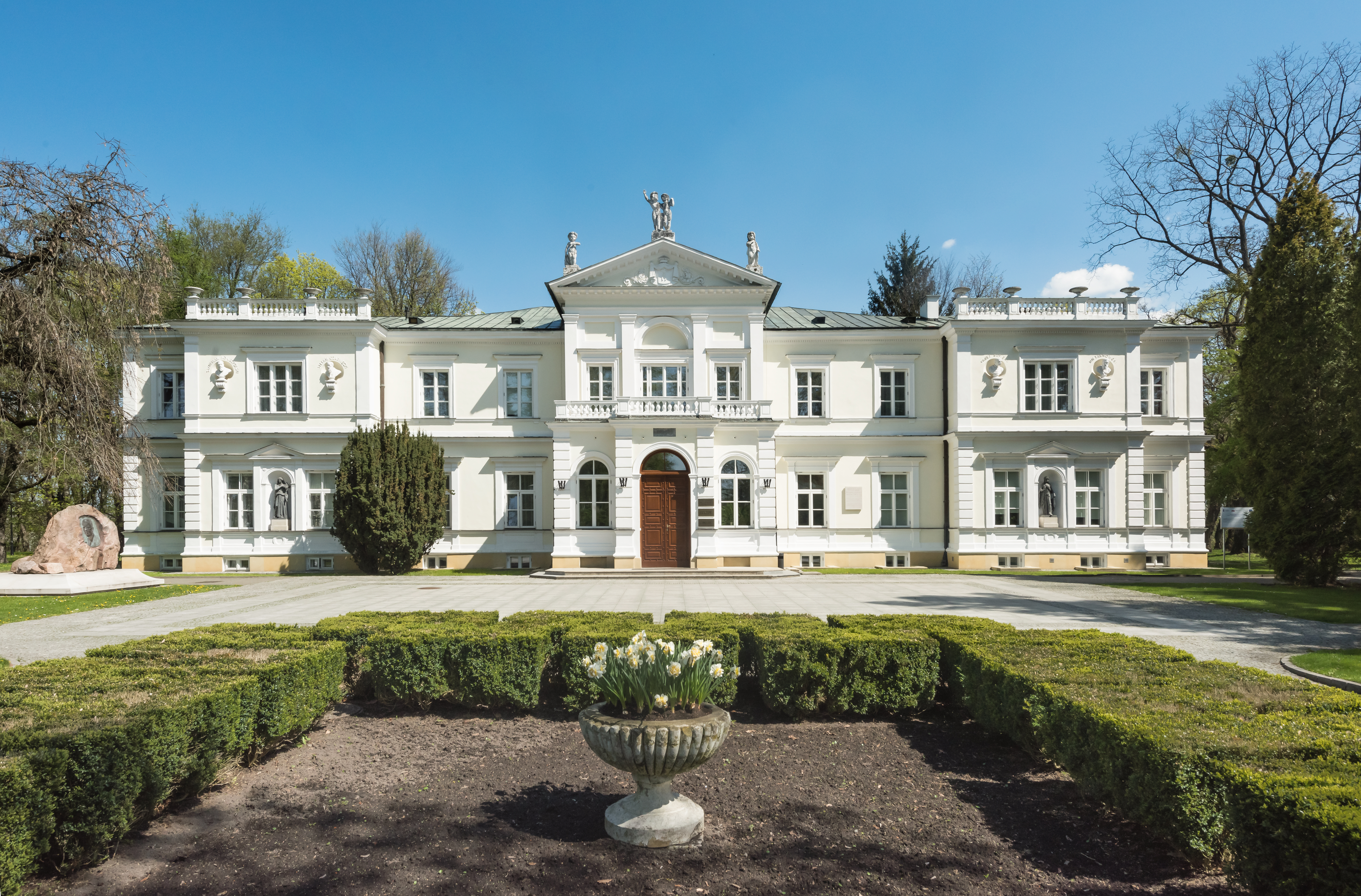
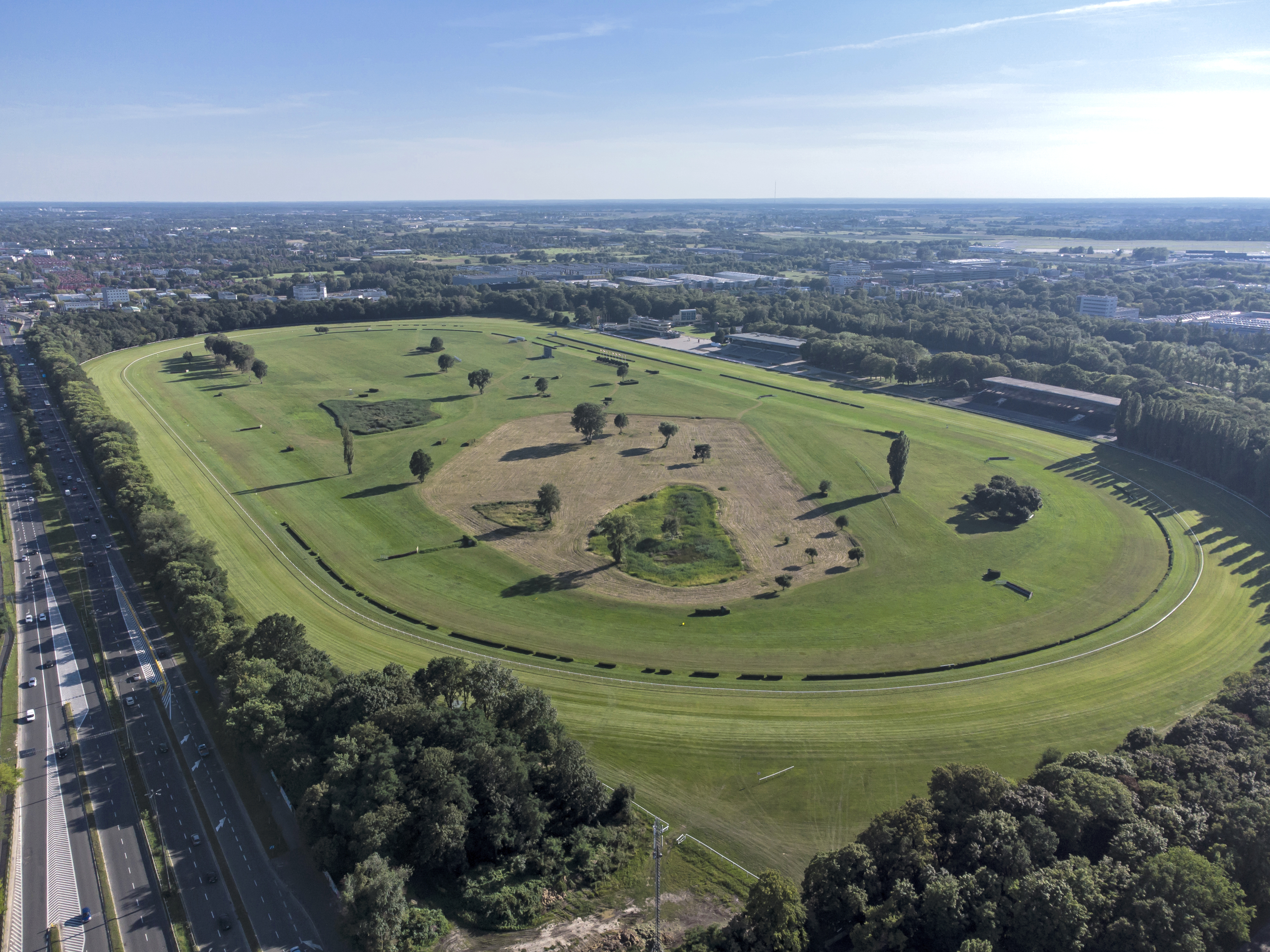
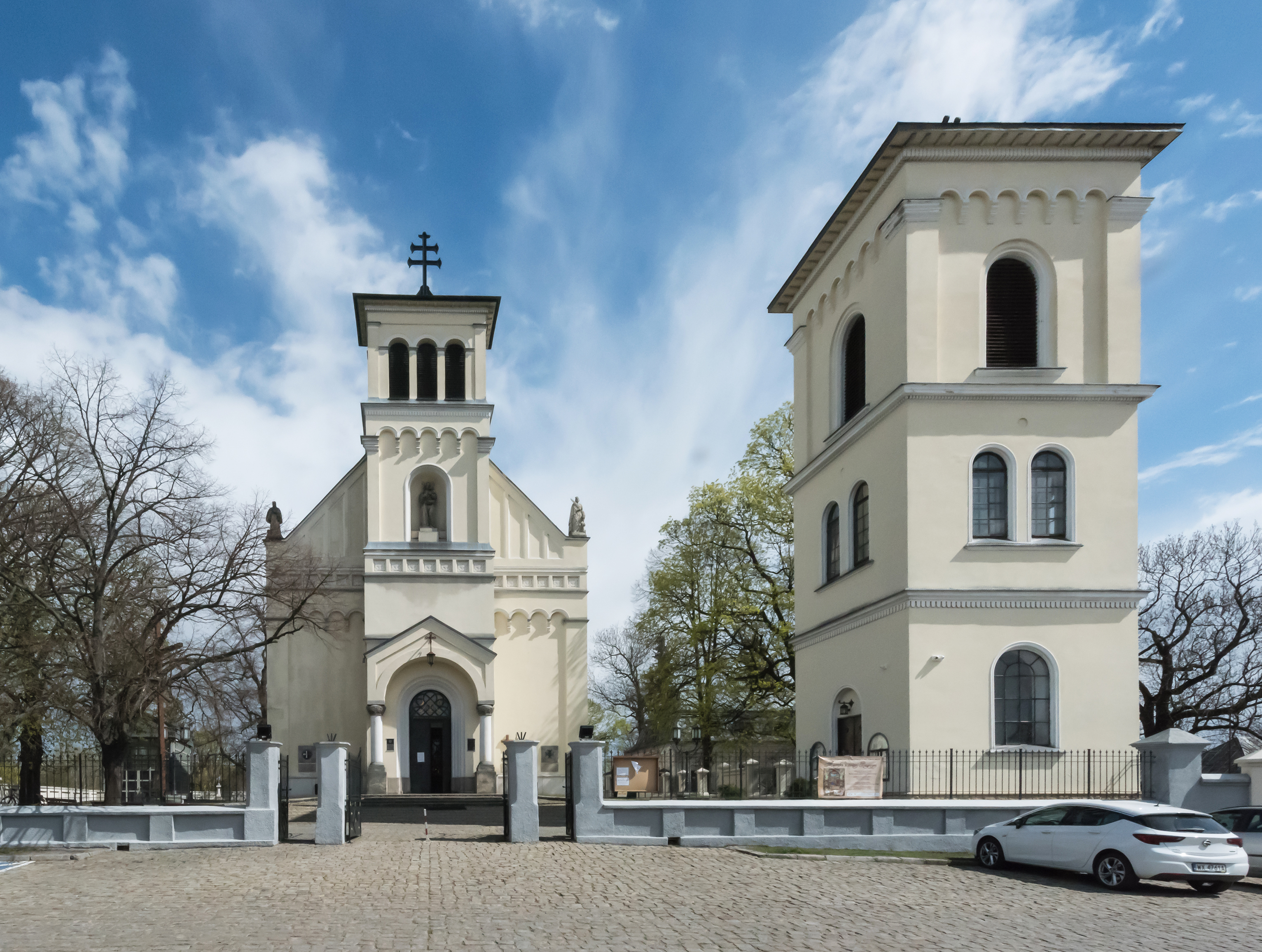
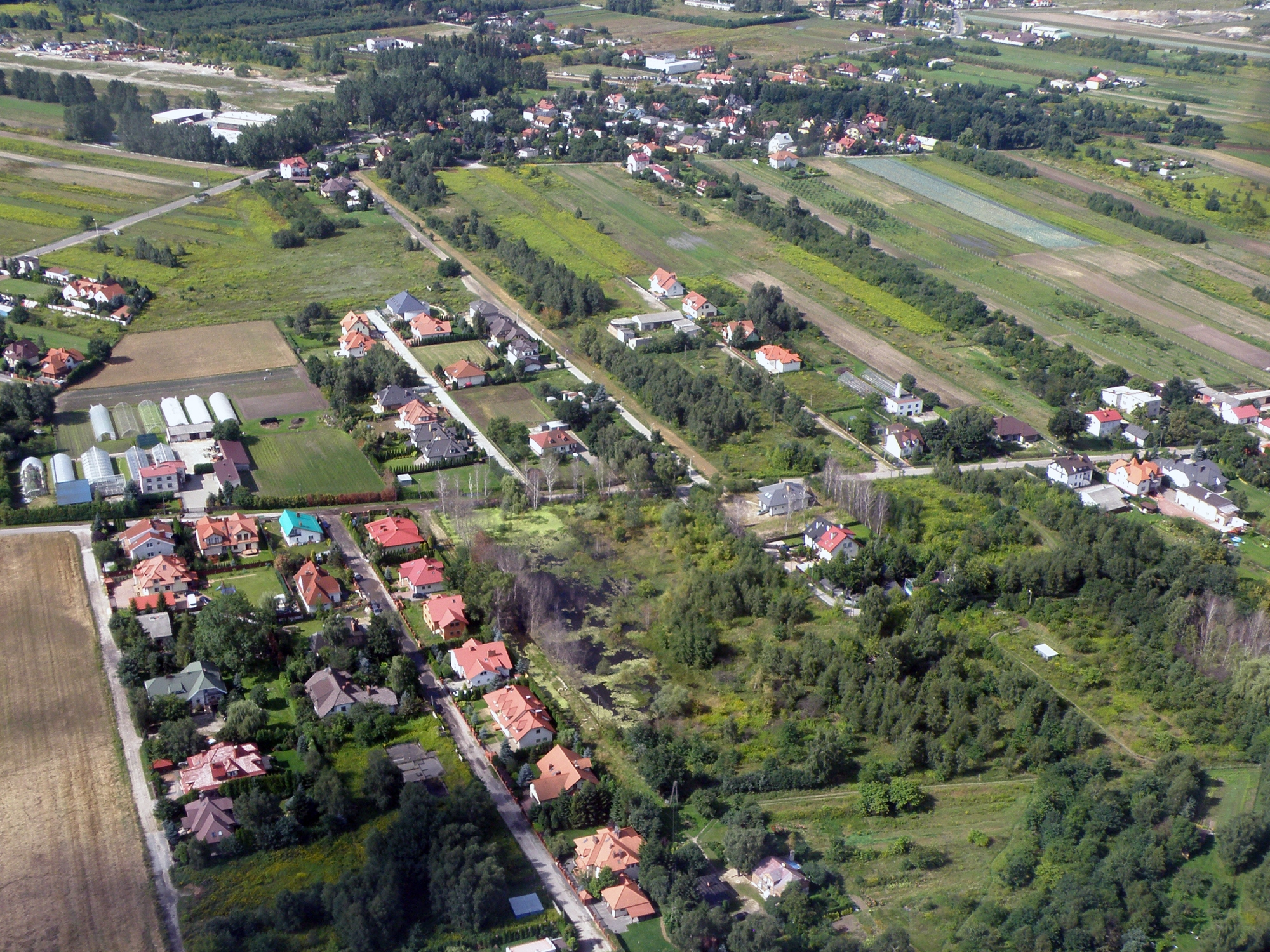
- Neighbourhoods of Jary and Stokłosy Kraśinski Palace Służewiec Racecourse St. Catherine Church Neighbourhood of Jeziorki

- Flag Coat of arms

- Location of Ursynów within Warsaw
- Coordinates: 52°8.5′N 21°2′E
- Country: Poland
- Voivodeship: Masovian
- City and county: Warsaw
- Establishment: 27 October 2002
- Seat: 61 Komisji Edukacji Narodowej Avenue

Government
  - Mayor: Robert Kempa

Area
  - Total: 43.73 km^{2} (16.88 sq mi)

Population (2023)
  - Total: 149,775
  - Density: 3,425/km^{2} (8,871/sq mi)
- Time zone: UTC+1 (CET)
  - Summer (DST): UTC+2 (CEST)
- Area code: +48 22
- Website: ursynow.um.warszawa.pl

Ursynów (Polish: [urˈsɘ̟n.uf]) is a district of the city of Warsaw, Poland. It has an area of 43.79 km^{2} (16.88 sq mi), and in 2023, it was inhabited by 149,775 people, making it the 5th most populous and 3rd largest district of the city. Located in its western part, it is its southernmost district of the city, bordering Włochy to the west, Mokotów to the north, Wilanów, to the east, with its southern and part of western border forming the city boundary. There, it borders the municipalities of Lesznowola in Piaseczno County, and Raszyn in Pruszków County. The district is dominated by residential areas, with its east predominantly featuring high-rise multifamily housing such as in neighbourhoods of Jary, and Stokłosy in central north, Imielin, Na Skraju, and West Ursynów in the northeast, and Natolin and Kabaty in the central east. The west is dominated by low-rise single-family housing with neighbourhoods of Dąbrówka, Grabów, Jeziorki, Pyry, and Wyczółki.

Ursynów is home to the campus of the Warsaw University of Life Sciences, one of the largest and most technologically advanced in Europe. It also includes the Maria Skłodowska-Curie National Research Institute of Oncology, the Institute of Haematology and Transfusion Medicine, and Centre for Advanced Materials and Technologies, with the latter being one of the largest high tech research facilities in the country. Ursynów also features several urban parks such as John Paul II Park, Kozłowski Park, Przy Bażantarni Park, and Silent Unseen Park, as well as the Polish Academy of Sciences Botanical Garden and Powsin Centre for Biological Diversity Conservation, which gathers over 10,000 species of plants in its collection, including numerous exotic and rare species. Additionally, the Kabaty Woods, located in the southwest, form the largest forest in the city, with an area of 903 hectares. The district also includes the Służewiec Racecourse, which hosts Great Warsaw Race, the most prestigious horse race in Poland. Ursynów also has five stations of the Warsaw Metro.

By the 9th century, the area was inhabited by the monks of the Order of Saint Benedict, in 1238, there was established a Roman Catholic parish in Warsaw, centered around the St. Catherine Parish, which would later be replaced with its current building in 1848. By that time, the village of Służew was also present in the area, and more farming communities developed in the following centuries. In 1776, there was constructed the Krasiński Palace, later rebuilt in 1860 in the Renaissance Revival. In 1939, in Ursynów was opened the Służewiec Racecourse, then the largest and the most modern horse racing venue in Europe. Throughout the 1930s, a military base in the neighbourhood of Pyry and nearby Kabaty Woods, operated a military complex, which housed a branch of the Cipher Bureau responsible for deciphering German codes and messages. Its team was the first to decipher the coding of the Enigma machine in 1932, used by the German military, sharing their decryption techniques there with British and French intelligence agencies in 1939. During the Second World War, under the German occupation over 300 people were executed and buried in the Kabaty Woods. Between the 1950s and 1970s, around Nowoursynowska Street was developed the campus of the Warsaw University of Life Sciences. Throughout the 1970s and 1980s, in Ursynów were developed series of large multifamily neighbourhoods. In 1995, there were opened five stations of the Warsaw Metro.

Służew and Wyczółki were incorporated into Warsaw in 1938, while the rest of the modern district was incorporated in 1951. They originally became part of Mokotów, with the area being first separated into its own administrative unit, then the municipality of Warsaw-Ursynów, in 1994. In 2002, it was restructured into the district of Ursynów.

== Toponymy ==
The name Ursynów comes from the landed estate called as such by writer and statesman Julian Ursyn Niemcewicz, who settled there in its Krasiński Palace in 1822. He named it after his family's cognomen Ursyn, which in turn came from Latin term ursus meaning "bear". With addition of the suffix -ów, it came to mean Ursyn's place. It would eventually become a name for the entirety of the city district after it was founded in 1994.

== History ==
=== Prehistory ===
The signs of human settlements from the Stone Age (4000 BCE to 2000 BCE), Bronze Age (3300 BCE to 1200 BCE), and the Lusatian culture (1300 BCE to 500 BCE) were discovered in the area of Warsaw Escarpment and Służewiec Stream, currently corresponding to the neighbourhood of Stary Służew in Ursynów.

=== Middle Ages ===
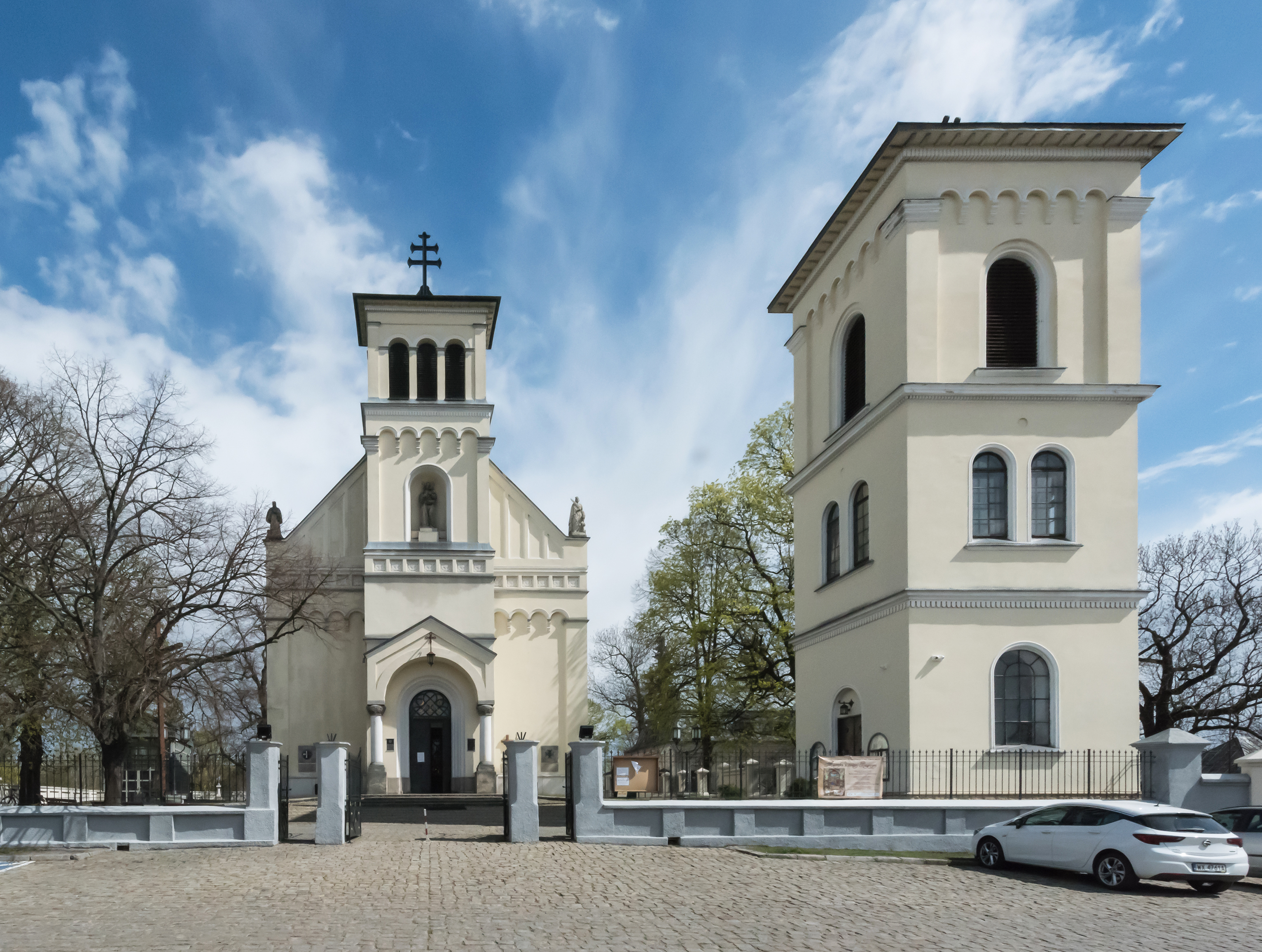
The St. Catherine Church, built in 1848, which is the seat of the oldest Roman Catholic parish in Warsaw, founded in 1238.

By 1065, the area of the current neighbourhood of Stary Służew was inhabited by the Roman Catholic monks of the Order of Saint Benedict, who operated a missionary centre there. In 1238, the Roman Catholic St. Catherine Parish was founded by Duke Konrad I of Masovia, ruler of the Duchy of Masovia, and erected by bishop Paweł II of Bnin. It is the oldest parish within modern boundaries of Warsaw. At the same time, nearby was also founded the Służew Old Cemetery. Archaeological findings suggest, that before that, it was a place of worship of Slavic pagans, with signs of fire that burned constantly for several-hundred years. The information about the design and history of the first church remains unknown. In the 13th century, in its place was built a wooden church, which was later replaced by a brick building. The St. Catherine Church was later rebuilt again in 1742, and in 1848, in Romanesque Revival style.

By 1238, the Służew (then known as Służewo), was present near the Sadurka stream (with Służewiec Stream currently being its only remainder), and owned by the Order of Canon Regulars of St. Augustin from Czerwińsk nad Wisłą. In 1240, the village was acquired by Duke Konrad I of Masovia, who then granted it to his knight and count, Gotard of Służew, on 27 April 1245. His descendants became the Służewiecki family of the Radwan heraldic clan, which owned the estate until the 17th century. In 1386, the village of Kabaty was granted the Kulm law rights by Duke Janusz I the Old, ruler of the Duchy of Warsaw. It was located at the edge of the Warsaw Escarpment, on a road connecting Warsaw and Czersk, within the central east part of the current district.

By the 15th century, several more farming communities formed within the area of modern Ursynów, most of which were owned and inhabited by petty nobility. This included Imielin in the central north, Wyczółki in the north west, Wolica in the north east, and Jeziorki and Dąbrówka in the south east. In 1445, Imielin was granted the Kulm law rights by Duke Bolesław IV of Warsaw. By 1528, near Kabaty was also present a small farming community of Moczydło.

=== Early modern period ===
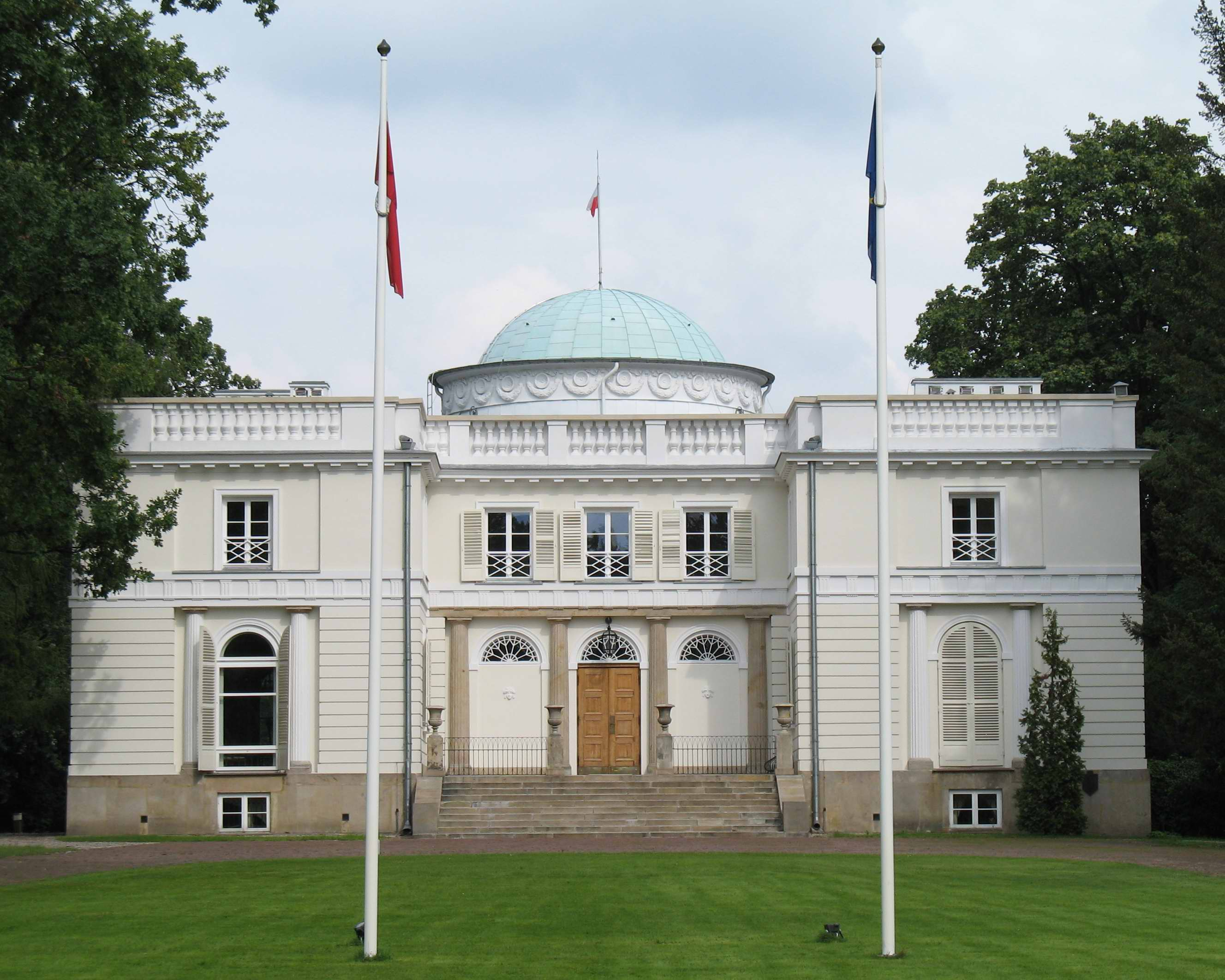
The Potocki Palace built in 1782.

In 1656, the villages of Jeziorki and Kabaty were destroyed by the army of the Swedish Empire, during the siege of Warsaw in the Second Northern War.

At the end of the 16th century, within the area of current Natolin and Błonia Wilanowskie, King John III Sobieski established a designated royal area for animal hunting, as part of the nearby Wilanów Palace complex. In 1730, the estate owners, Maria Zofia Czartoryska and August Aleksander Czartoryski, leased it to King Augustus II the Strong, who turned it into a pheasantry, with the area becoming known as Bażantaria (Polish for pheasantry). It was designed in a French Baroque style, with pathways branching out away from the main building, similar to those in Palace of Versailles. In 1733, the property was returned to its owners. In 1780, Czartoryski began the construction of his residence, which later became known as the Potocki Palace. The Neoclassical building was designed by a renowned contemporary architect Szymon Bogumił Zug, while the interior was designed by Vincenzo Brenna. It featured a distinctive half-open salon, with a view of the forest below the Warsaw Escarpment. Its construction was finished in 1782, and following Czartoryski's death the same year, it was inherited by his daughter, Elżbieta Izabela Lubomirska. In 1799, it became a wedding gift to her daughter Aleksandra Lubomirska and brother-in-law Stanisław Kostka Potocki, and in 1805, it was inherited by their son Aleksander Stanisław Potocki and his wife Anna Tyszkiewicz. In 1807, following the birth of their daughter, Natalia Potocka, the area was renamed after her to Natolin. The palace was rebuilt in 1808, with project by Chrystian Piotr Aigner, and again between 1834 and 1838, with project by Enrico Marconi. In 1892, it was inherited by the Branicki family. Currently, the palace is located in the district of Wilanów, next to the Ursynów border.

In the 18th century, the villages of Grabów and Pyry were founded in the north and central west of Ursynów. In the 1720s, Kabaty and Moczydło were bought by Elżbieta Sieniawska, a noblewoman and landowner, who then incorporated them into the Wilanów Estate. In 1726, she also ordered the protection of the nearby Kabaty Woods from deforestation. Additionally in 1731, the estate was expanded with Wolica being bought by nobleperson Maria Zofia Czartoryska.

In 1776, in the Krasiński Palace was built near Służew. It was commissioned by princess Elżbieta Izabela Lubomirska as a gift for her daughter Aleksandra Lubomirska, and son-in-law Stanisław Kostka Potocki, and was originally known as the Delight Palace. In 1822, it became the property of Julian Ursyn Niemcewicz, who organized there a library collecting rare and valuable books. He renamed his estate after his family's cognomen to Ursynów, which later inspired the name of the modern city district. The palace was rebuilt in 1860 in the Renaissance Revival style. In 1857, it was acquired by the Krasiński family. Its last owner, Edward Bernard Raczyński donated it to the Ministry of Religious Affairs and Public Education in 1921.

=== 19th century ===
At the beginning of the 19th century, German settlers began moving into Jeziorki, and in 1864, they also founded the nearby village of Ludwinów. In the second half of said century, Krasnowola and Grabówek were also established near Grabów.

In 1821, the Gucin residence was founded in Służew by Stanisław Kostka Potock, and between 1821 and 1830, the garden complex of Gucin Grove was developed around it. At the turn of the 19th century, catacombs were also built.

Following the abolition of serfdom in 1864, the area of modern Ursynów was divided and incorporated into two municipalities, with the southern portion going to Falenty, and northern to Wilanów, with a small area southeast of Kabaty Woods, additionally becoming part of Jeziorna.

In the 1880s, the Fort VIII was constructed near Służew, as part of the series of fortifications of the Warsaw Fortress, built around the city by the Imperial Russian Army. It was decommissioned in 1909, and partially demolished, including all its concrete structures.

In 1898, three narrow-gauge railway stations of the Grójec Commuter Railway, called Grabów Emilin, Warszawa Dąbrówka Wąskotorowa, and Warszawa Pyry, were opened alongside Puławska Street. They formed a part of the line connecting Warszawa Mokotów and Nowe Miasto nad Pilicą. Additionally, the Służewiec station was added in 1903. Warszawa Pyry was closed in 1969, while the rest of the line, operated until 1971.

In 1898, a brick factory was opened in Dąbrówka, and used a nearby railway to export its products. A small settlement for its employees was founded nearby in the 1910s, and included a small primary school. The brickworks industry left behind numerous clay pits in the area, which were subsequently flooded, forming ponds.

=== 20th century before the Second World War ===
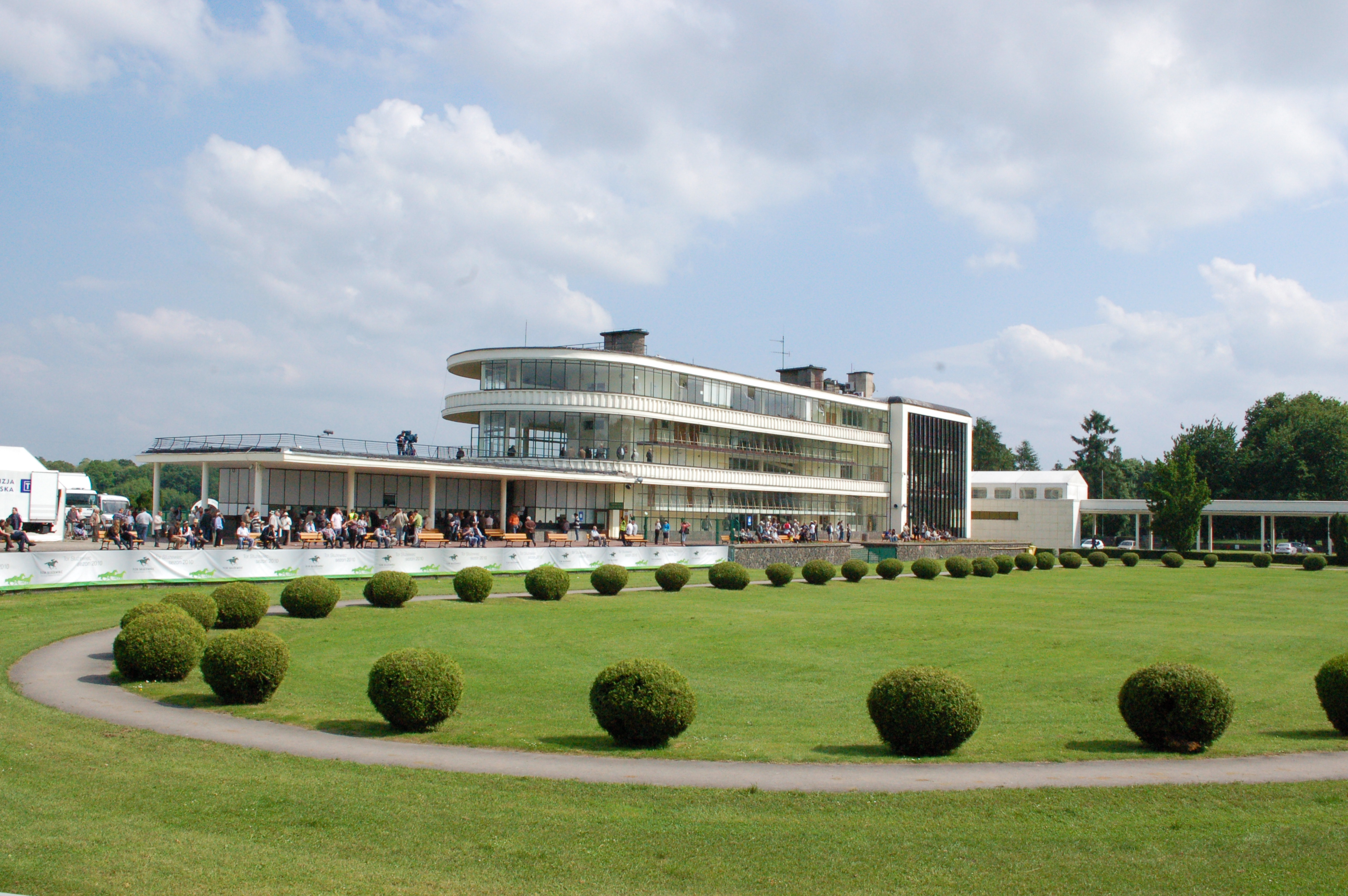
The Służewiec Racecourse opened in 1939.

Between 1925 and 1939, the Służewiec Racecourse was built at 266 Puławska Street. Upon its opening, it became the largest and most modern horse racing venue in Europe, with its main circuit measuring 2,300 m (1.4 miles). It began hosting the Great Warsaw Race, the most prestigious horse race in Poland.

In 1934, the Warszawa Okęcie railway station was opened near Gorzkiewki Street, to serve the nearby Warsaw Chopin Airport. In 1936, the Warszawa Jeziorki station opened at the intersection of Karczunkowska and Gogolińska Streets.

In the 1930s, a military complex of the General Staff of the Polish Armed Forces was constructed in Pyry, at 8 Kajakowa Street, and in the nearby Kabaty Woods. From 1937 to 1939, it housed a branch of the Cipher Bureau, responsible for deciphering German codes and messages. A team of mathematicians employed by it, consisting of Marian Rejewski, Jerzy Różycki, and Henryk Zygalski, was the first to decipher coding of the Enigma machine in 1932. They continued their work and shared their decryption techniques there with British and French intelligence agencies in June 1939. Currently, since 2002, it houses the Air Operations Centre and Air Component Command of the Polish Air Force. On 31 December 1938, the city of Warsaw bought the Kabaty Woods, and dedicated its portion to urban development.

On 27 September 1938, Służew and Wyczółki were incorporated into the city of Warsaw, becoming part of the district of Mokotów.

In 1938, nuns of the Society of the Sacred Heart established a chapel in Grabów. In 1952, it became a parish church, and between 1990 and 1995, the St. Sophie Barat Church was built in its place.

=== Second World War ===
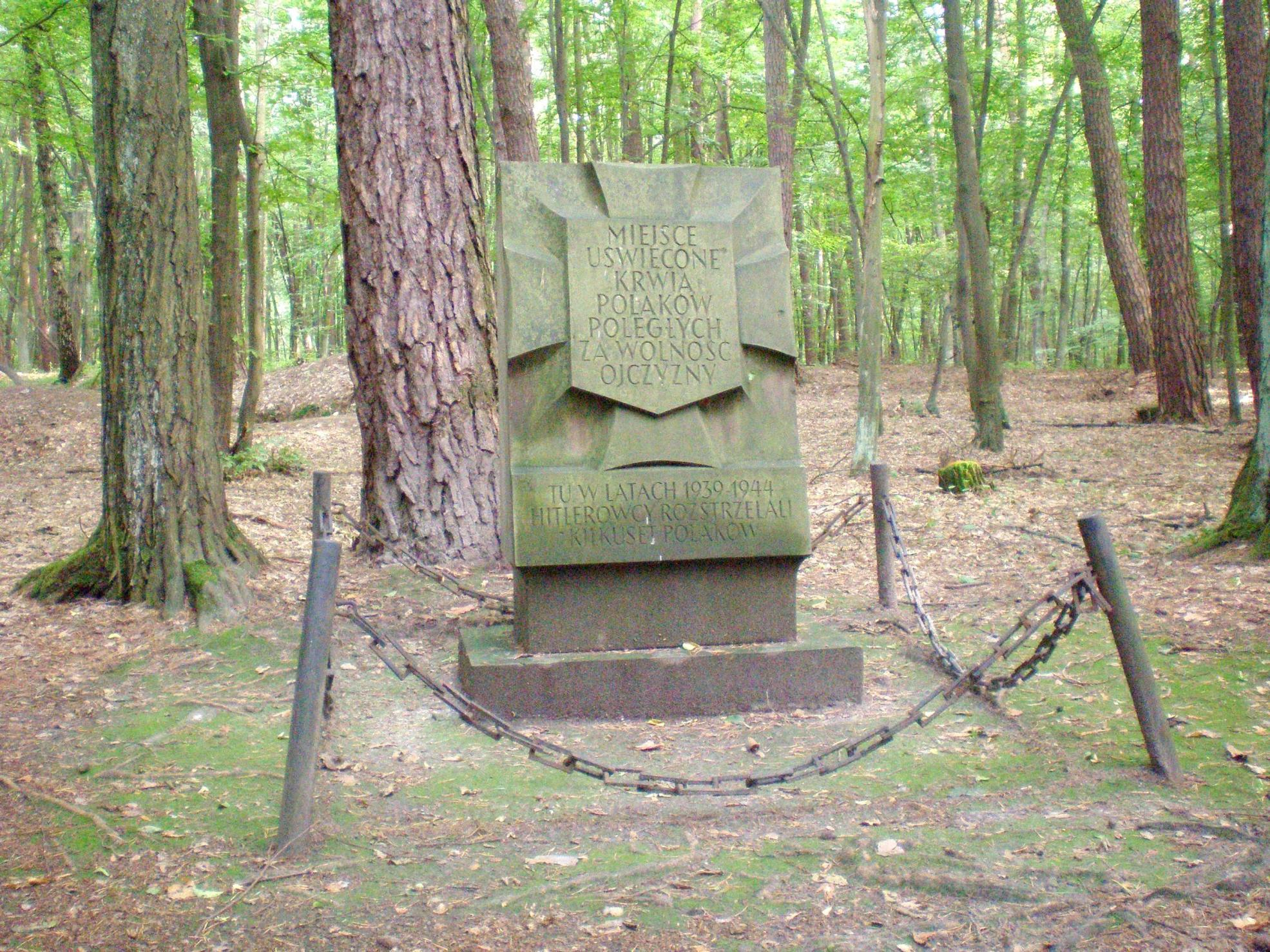
A memorial dedicated to people executed in Kabaty Woods between 1939 and 1944.

On 1 September 1939, Nazi Germany began the invasion into Poland, starting the Second World War, with their forces arriving at the outskirts of Warsaw on 8 September, capturing most of the surrounding villages. Following a siege, the city capitulated on 28 September. Sometime between 13 and 17 November 1939, fifteen Polish men were executed and buried by German officers in the Natolin Woods. Later, sometime between December 1939 and January 1940, according to the testimony of a witness, around 200 more people were executed and buried in the Kabaty Woods. The location was a site of mass execution at least five more times between 1941 and 1943, with the bodies of 110 victims being uncovered after the war.

While under the occupation, the Służewiec Racecourse was used as an airstrip for fighter aircraft of the German Air Force. In July 1944, between 600 and 800 German soldiers were stationed there. On 1 August 1944, on the first day of the Warsaw Uprising, the Polish resistance participants from the Karpaty Battalion of the Baszta Regiment, carried out an unsuccessful attack on the airstrip, suffering heavy casualties. Later that day, in retaliation, the German forces organised an execution at the racecourse, killing captured partisans and a group of civilians, rounded up in the nearby Służew.

=== Communist period ===
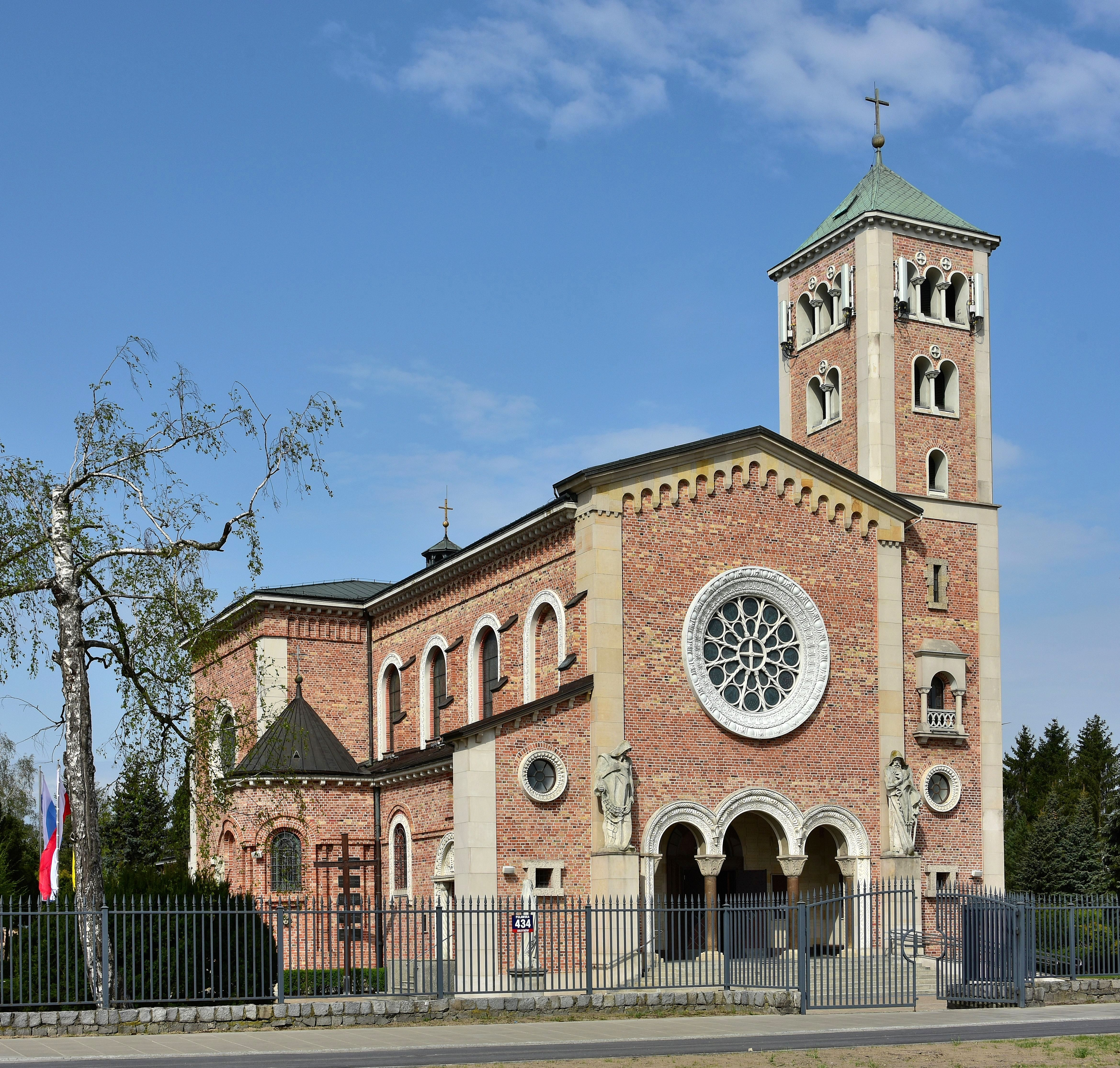
The Sts. Apostles Peter and Paul Church, constructed between 1946 and 1973.

Between 1945 and 1947, near the St. Catherine Church, the Security Office had buried in unmarked graves bodies of political prisoners murdered in the Mokotów Prison. It is estimated that around two thousand people were buried there. The bodies were later exhumed and moved to the nearby Służew Old Cemetery. In 1993, the Memorial to the 1944–1956 Communist Terror Martyrs, was unveiled there to commemorate the victims.

In 1945, the Potocki Palace was nationalised and placed under the administration of the Warsaw National Museum. It was renovated and turned into the official residence of the President of Poland, Bolesław Bierut, and was used by the Office of the Council of Ministers. In 1991, around 100 hectares of the Natolin Park received the status of a nature reserve, under the name Natolin Woods. In 1992, the palace became a centre of a campus of the branch of the College of Europe, with several other buildings being built around it.

Between 1946 and 1973, the Sts. Apostles Peter and Paul Church was built at 434 Puławska Street, belonging to the Roman Catholic denomination.

On 14 May 1951, the municipalities of Falenty and Wilanów were incorporated into the city of Warsaw, becoming part of the Mokotów district.

In 1951, the area of Wyczółki, together with the nearby Służewiec and Zbarż, was designated to become the Industrial and Storage District of Służewiec, later known as Służewiec Przemysłowy (Industrial Służewiec). It was envisioned to feature 60 factories and industrial plants. The construction began in 1952, and utilised the large panel system technique, marking it as one of the first instances of its usage in Poland. The designated area covered around 2.6 km^{2} (1 sq mi). In the early 1970s, around 20,000 people were employed in the industrial district. In the 1990s, the manufacturing industry left the area, leading to the emergence of residential and office buildings in its place.

In 1956, the Council of Ministers donated a plot of land in Służew, as well as in nearby Natolin, Wilanów, and Wolica to the Warsaw University of Life Sciences. The acquired area included the Krasiński Palace and a vocational school, which were adopted into the university campus centred on Nowoursynowska Street. It was further developed with new faculty buildings throughout the 1960s and 1970s. In 1989, the palace became the seat of the university authorities. Between 1999 and 2002, it was expanded with the construction of a new campus, which became one of the most technologically advanced in Europe. In 2003, all remaining faculties and institutions of the university were moved to Służew. Since 1983, the university hosts annually the Ursynalia, one of the largest music festivals in Poland.

The Warszawa Dawidy railway station was opened in 1962 at Baletowa Street in Jeziorki. Currently, it is a part of the railway line between Warsaw West and Kraków Main stations.

In 1974, the Polish Academy of Sciences Botanical Garden and Powsin Centre for Biological Diversity Conservation was established to the southeast from Kabaty Woods, with an area of 40 hectares. It was developed between 1978 and 1990.

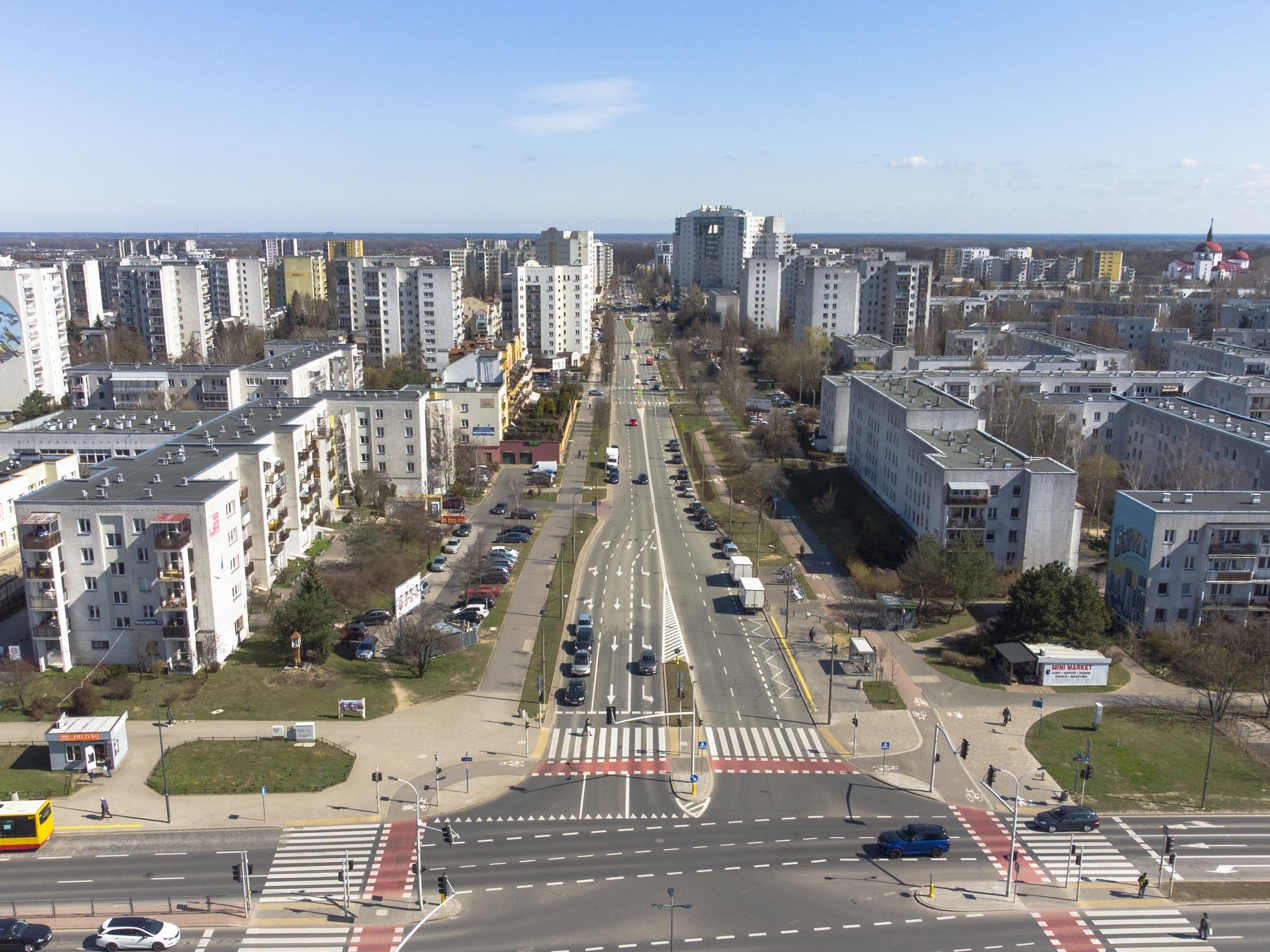
The neighbourhood of Natolin, which construction begun in the 1980s.

In the 1970s and 1980s, the residential neighbourhoods with apartment buildings built in the large panel system technique, began to be developed across Ursynów. Between 1971 and 1977, the area of North Ursynów was established, with neighbourhoods of Jary, Koński Jar-Nutki, and Stokłosy. In 1977, the Roman Kozłowski Park was also opened in the area, including the Cwil Mound, an artificial mound formed from the ground excavated during the building construction. Between 1976 and 1981, neighbourhoods of Imielin, Na Skraju, and West Ursynów were also built to the south.

Beginning in 1981, throughout the 1980s, a complex of housing estates were developed in the central-eastern part of Ursynów, on an axis of Komisji Edukacji Narodowej Avenue, including Natolin and Wyżyny. From the 1980s to the 2000s, to the south was also built the neighbourhood of Kabaty. In 1982, Ursynów had a population of around 78,000 people. In 1982, Ursynów had a population of around 78,000 people.

In 1979, the new headquarters and medical complex of the Maria Skłodowska-Curie National Research Institute of Oncology began being developed at 5 Roentgena Street. Its first portion was opened in 1984, and the new buildings were opened in the following years, with the full completion in 1997.

On 11 August 1980, Kabaty Woods became a nature reserve, which forms the largest forest within Warsaw, with an area of 903 ha.

Between 1982 and 1989, the Roman Catholic Church of the Ascension was built at 101 Komisji Edukacji Narodowej Avenue.

In the late morning of 9 May 1987, the Ilyushin Il-62M jet airliner operating the flight 5055 crashed in the Kabaty Woods, around 56 minutes after departure from the Warsaw Chopin Airport. All 183 passengers and crew members on board were killed, making it the deadliest aviation disaster in Polish history.

=== Democratic period ===
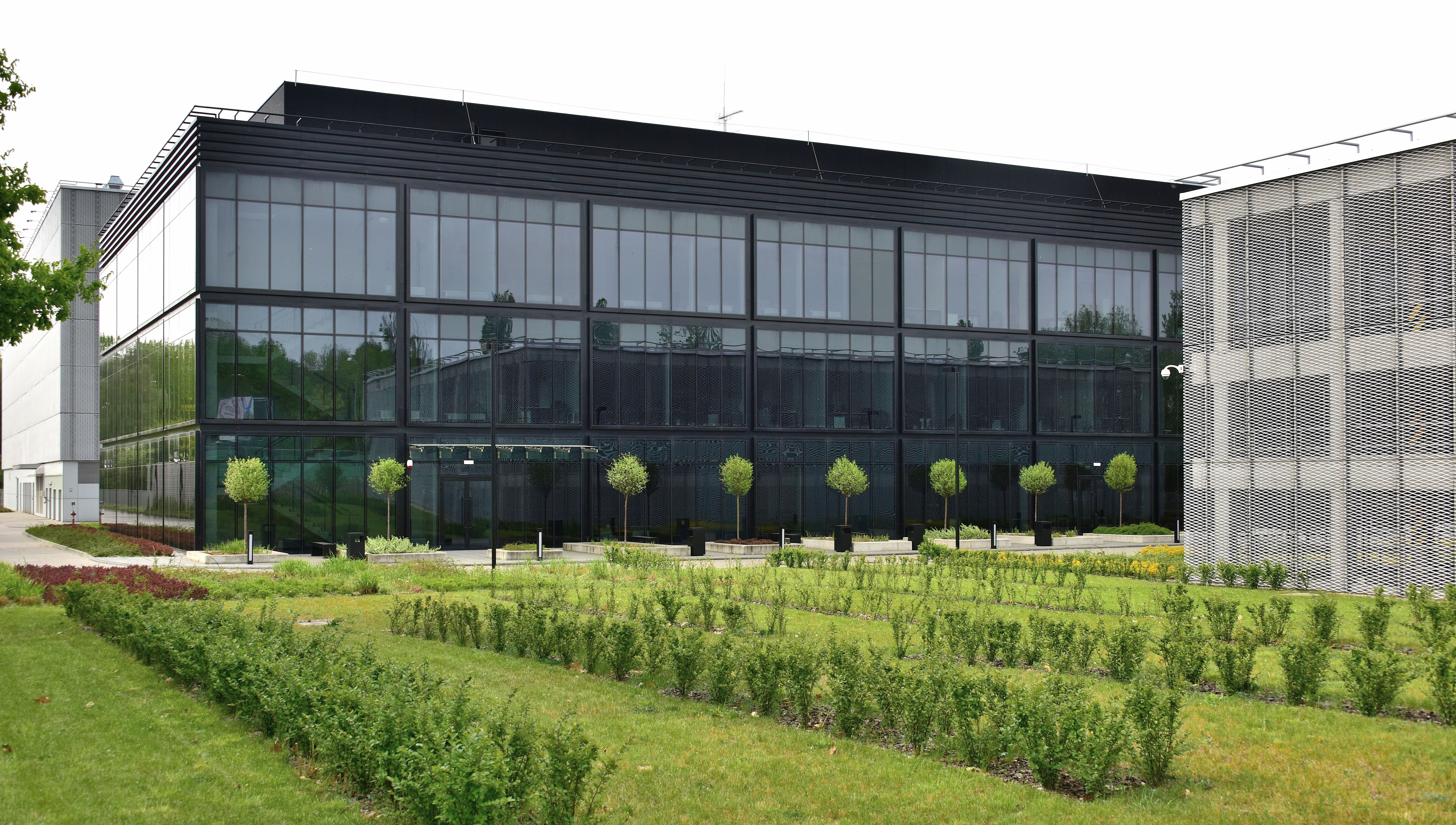
The Advanced Materials and Technologies Centre, one of the largest high tech research facilities in Poland, opened in 2016.

In 1990, following the administrative changes, the city districts, including Mokotów, were turned into municipalities. In 1994, its southwest portion was separated, forming the municipality of Warsaw-Ursynów. Służew was divided into two parts, with its majority remaining in Mokotów, and a smaller historical area to the south, being ceased to Ursynów, forming Stary Służew (Old Służew). Additionally, Natolin Park and Potocki Palace, became part of Wilanów instead. In 1996, it was partially divided into administrative neighbourhoods, governed by local elected councils, including Etap, Dąbrówka, Jeziorki, Prawdziwka, Pyry, and Wyczółki. In 1996, the district was divided into thirteen City Information System areas, as part of a municipal standardised system of street signage. Their boundaries were slightly adjusted in 2000. On 27 October 2002, the municipality was restructured into the district of Ursynów.

In 1992, the Vistula University was opened at 3 Stokłosy Street, becoming one of the oldest and one of the leading private universities in Poland. In 1994, another private university, known as the Warsaw School of Advertising, was also founded at 3 Szolc-Rogozińskiego Street, becoming the country's leading school in its field.

On 7 April 1995, five stations of the M1 line of Warsaw Metro rapid transit underground system. were opened in the area. This included Imielin, Kabaty, Natolin, Stokłosy, and Ursynów. To the south, next to the Kabaty Woods was also opened a motive power depot of the metro system, known as the Kabaty Technical and Parking Station.

Between the 1990s and 2020s, several Catholic churches were constructed within the district, including Blessed Ladislas of Gielniów, Presentation of Jesus, St. Padre Pio, St. Sophie Barat, and Thomas the Apostle.

Throughout the 2000s and 2010s, five urban park were also developed in the area, including John Paul II Park opened in 2000, Przy Bażantarni Park in 2008, Moczydełko Park in 2009, Birch Woods Park in 2010, and Silent Unseen Park in 2016.

In 2006, the new headquarters of the Institute of Haematology and Transfusion Medicine, a state research facility of hematology, were opened at 14 Indiry Gandhi Street.

In 2007, the Arena Ursynów indoor sports stadium was opened at 122 Pileckiego Street.

In 2008, the Ursynów Town Hall was built at 61 Komisji Edukacji Narodowej Avenue, as the seat of government of the district.

In 2013, the expressway S79 was the eastern district boundary, connecting Mokotów to the Warsaw Chopin Airport and the Expressway S7. The same year, at its intersection, was also opened part of the Expressway S2 leading east to Puławska Street, which itself forms the national road 79. In 2021, it was extended further east, connecting to Wilanów and Expressway S17. Part of it crosses through a tunnel, with a length of 2.3 km (1.4 miles).

Between 2015 and 2023, the Polish Orthodox St. Sophia Church of Holy Wisdom was constructed at 568 Puławska Street, becoming the first, and the largest, Orthodox church to be constructed in Warsaw, in over 100 years.

In 2016, the Advanced Materials and Technologies Centre was opened at 19 Poleczki Street, becoming one of the largest high tech research facilities in Poland.

In 2019, the Fort VIII was renovated, and turned into a shopping centre.

In 2021, the Southern Hospital was opened at 99 Pileckiego Street.

== Government ==
=== Mayor and district council ===
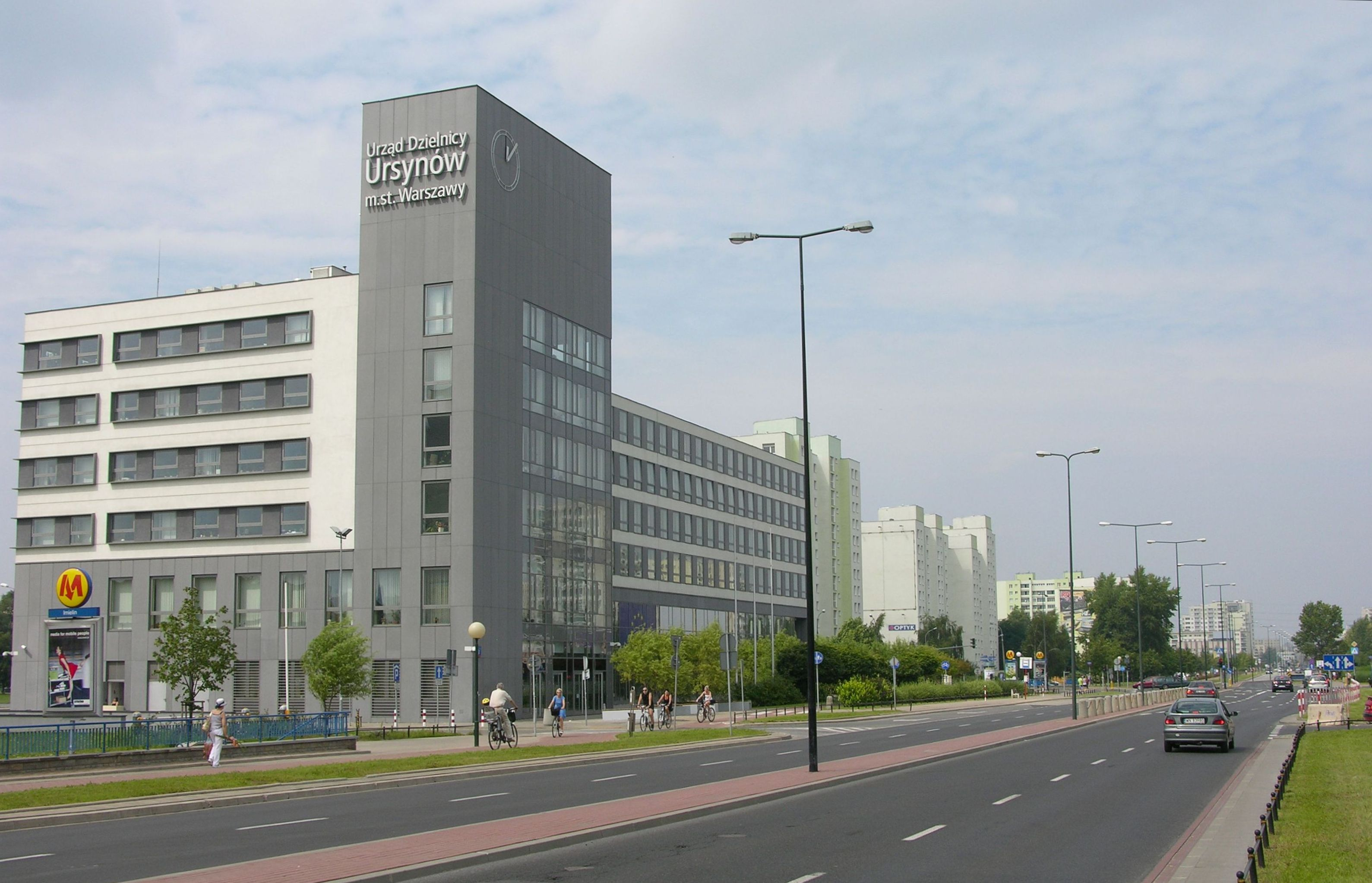
The Ursynów Town Hall.

Ursynów is one of eighteen districts of the city of Warsaw. Its government is divided into two branches: the management board as the executive branch, and an elected council with 25 members, as the legislative and regulatory branch. It is led by the mayor (Polish: burmistrz). Since 1994, the office has been held by:

- 1994–2002: Stanisław Faliński;
- 2002–2003: Tomasz Sieradz;
- 2003–2006: Andrzej Machowski;
- 2006–2009: Tomasz Mencina;
- 2009–2010: Urszula Kierzkowska;
- 2010–2014: Piotr Guział;
- 2014–present: Robert Kempa.

District council membership
Party	2002–2006	2006–2010	2010–2014	2014–2018	2018–2024	2024–2029
Civic Coalition	—N/a	—N/a	—N/a	—N/a	13	13
Civic Platform	7	11	11	11	—N/a	—N/a
Democratic Left Alliance and Labour Union	8	—N/a	—N/a	—N/a	—N/a	—N/a
Law and Justice	10	5	4	5	5	5
Left and Democrats	—N/a	3	—N/a	—N/a	—N/a	—N/a
Open Ursynów	—N/a	—N/a	—N/a	—N/a	3	2
Our Ursynów	—N/a	6	10	7	—N/a	—N/a
Project Ursynów	—N/a	—N/a	—N/a	—N/a	4	5
Ursynów Residents' Initiative	—N/a	—N/a	—N/a	2	—N/a	—N/a

=== Subdivisions ===
The subdivision of Ursynów into the areas of the City Information System.

Ursynów includes administrative neighbourhoods, governed locally by elected councils. This includes:

- Etap;
- Dąbrówka;
- Jeziorki
- Prawdziwka;
- Pyry;
- Wyczółki.

It is also subdivided into thirteen areas of the City Information System, as part of a municipal standardised system of street signage. This includes:

- Dąbrówka;
- Grabów;
- Jeziorki Północne;
- Jeziorki Południowe;
- Kabaty;
- Natolin;
- North Ursynów;
- Pyry;
- Skarpa Powsińska;
- Stary Imielin;
- Stary Służew;
- Ursynów-Centrum;
- Wyczółki.

This excludes the area of the Kabaty Woods Nature Reserve.

Additionally, the district is traditionally divided into two sides, High-rise Ursynów (Polish: Wysoki Ursynów) in the north, east, and south, dominated by the high-rise multifamily residential housing, and Green Ursynów (Polish: Zielony Ursynów), in the west, alongside Puławska Street, with low-rise single-family residential housing.

=== Government buildings ===
The district government is housed in the Ursynów Town Hall at 61 Komisji Edukacji Narodowej Avenue. Additionally, within the district, are also present the National Clearing House, an institution of the banking sector in Poland, at 65 Pileckiego Street, and the Air Operations Centre and Air Component Command of the Polish Air Force, at 8 Kajakowa Street, and in the nearby Kabaty Woods.

== Demographics ==
=== Population ===
In 2023, Ursynów had a population of 149,775 people, making up around 8% of the city residents, and making it the 5th most populous district. In contrast with previous years, its population has slightly diminished from 151,304 in 2020, while experiencing steady growth until then, with 144,580 in 2010, and 134,440 in 2002. In 2023, the majority of the population was in the working age of between 18 and 64, with 89,782 people, or 59.9%. A total of 26,228 people, or 17.5%, were under the age of 18, while 33,765, or 22.5%, were over 65. Ursynów has an area of 43.79 km^{2} (16.88 sq mi), making up around 8% of the city, and being its 3rd largest district. In 2023, it had the population density of 3,425 people per km^{2} (8,871 people per sq mi).

In 2022, around 50,000 people were employed in the district, and there were around 33,000 registered businesses, including 22,900 registered to physical persons.

Historical population
Year	1950	1960	1970	1978	1988	1994	2002	2005	2010	2020	2021	2023
Pop.	17,816	14,559	11,711	26,051	101,313	109,766	134,440	140,711	144,580	151,304	151,432	149,775
±%	—	−18.3%	−19.6%	+122.4%	+288.9%	+8.3%	+22.5%	+4.7%	+2.7%	+4.7%	+0.1%	−1.1%

=== Religion ===
Ursynów has several Roman Catholic parish churches. This includes the St. Catherine Church built in the 19th century, which is the seat of the oldest parish in Warsaw, dating to 1238. The Służew Old Cemetery, dating to the 13th century, is also present nearby. Among other churches in the area are the Church of Ascension, Blessed Ladislas of Gielniów Church, Church of the Presentation of Jesus, Sts. Apostles Peter and Paul Church, St. Padre Pio Church, St. Sophie Barat Church, and Thomas the Apostle Church. Additionally, St. Sophia Church of Holy Wisdom, belonging to the Polish Orthodox denomination, is also present within the district. Additionally, Ursynów also includes a monastery of the Society of the Sacred Heart, and a Christian mission centre of the Salesians of Don Bosco.

== Housing ==
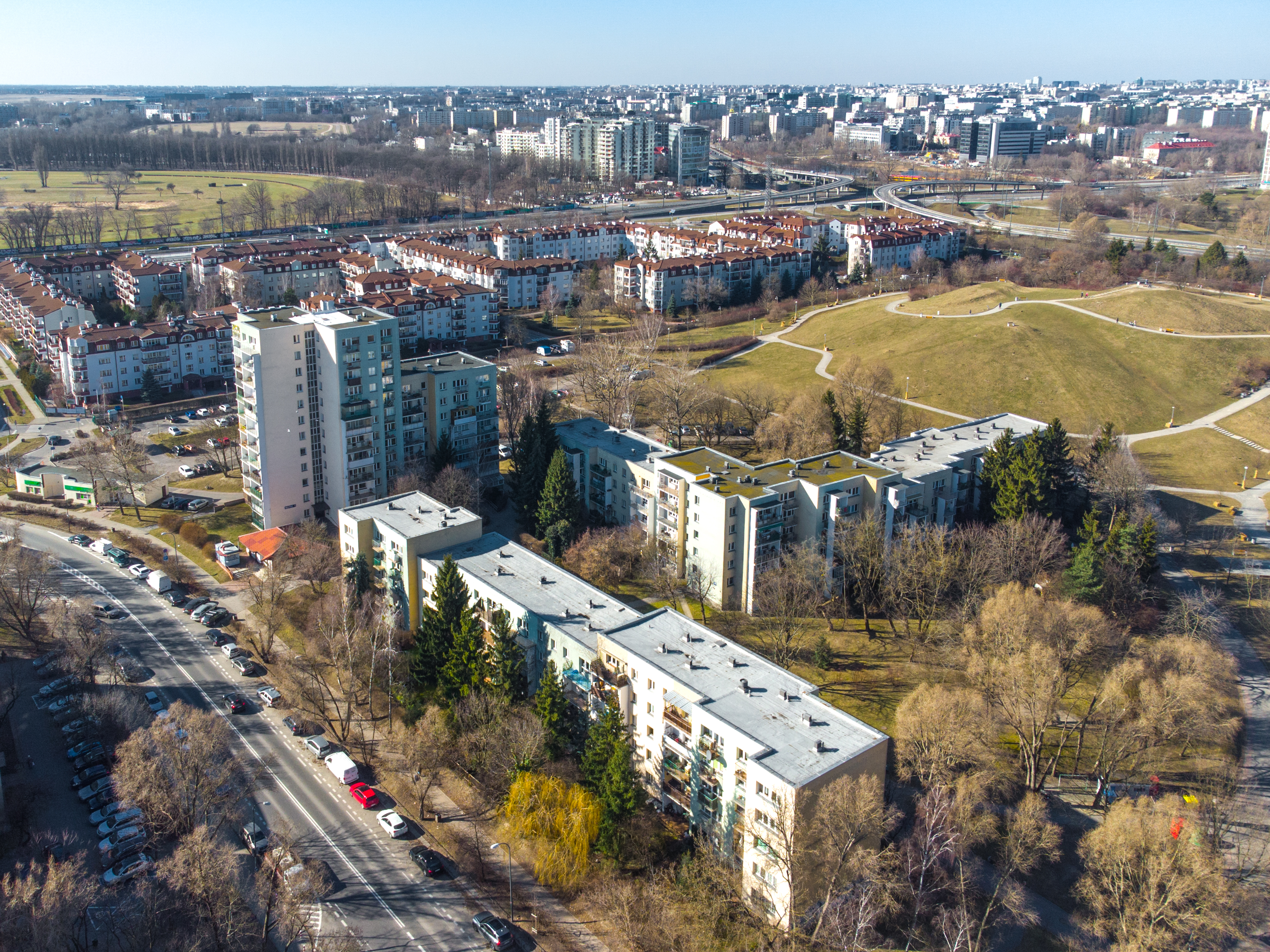
The multifamily housing in the neighbourhood of Koński Jar-Nutki.

The northeastern part of Ursynów is dominated by high-rise multifamily housing. This includes the neighborhoods of Imielin, Jary, Stokłosy, Na Skraju, and West Ursynów in the north, and Kabaty, Natolin, and Wyżyny in the central east. The exception is the low-rise single-family housing in Stary Ursynów around Nowoursynowska Street in the far northeast, Wolica and Stare Kabaty alongside eastern district boundary, and Moczydło around Moczydłowska Street in central east. The low-rise housing also dominates the western part of the district, with neighbourhoods such as Grabów, Krasnowola, Jeziorki, and Pyry. The exception is the neighbourhood of Wyczółki in the northwest, being a mixed area of high-rise residential and office buildings. The majority of the southeastern district is dominated by the nature reserve of the Kabaty Woods, and remains unpopulated. The exception are two small neighbourhoods of Janówek and Łęczyca at the southeastern boundary of the district.

== Higher education and science ==
=== Higher education ===
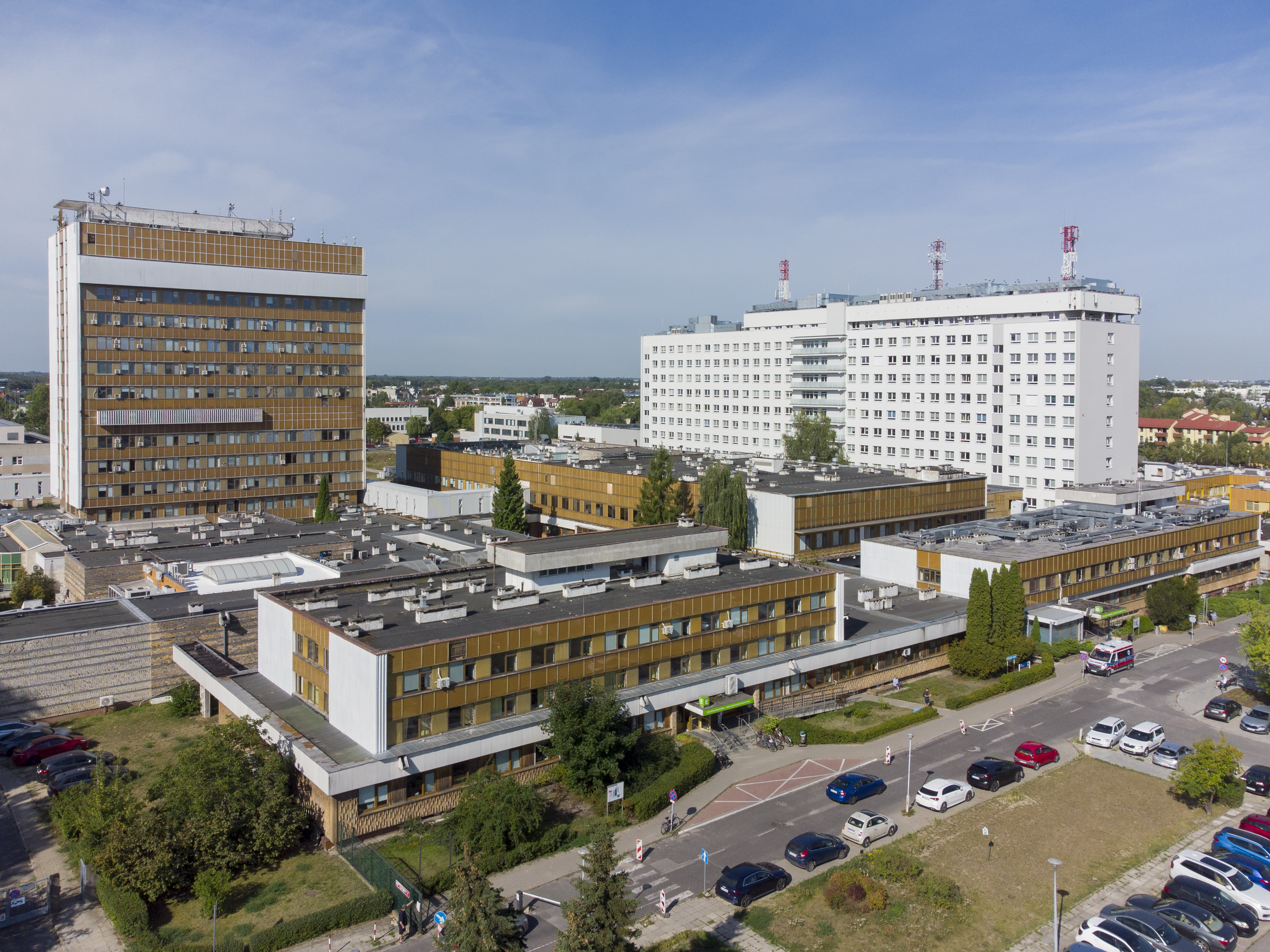
The Maria Skłodowska-Curie National Research Institute of Oncology.

The neighbourhood of Stary Służew contains the campus of the Warsaw University of Life Sciences, one of the largest and advanced in the country. It includes the Krasiński Palace, a historical 19th-century residence, placed at 166 Nowoursynowska Street, which serves as the seat of the university authorities. Additionally, the district also includes private universities such as the Vistula University at 3 Stokłosy Street, and the Warsaw School of Advertising at 3 Szolc-Rogozińskiego Street, considered respectively, as Poland's leading private university, and leading school of advertising.

=== Science and healthcare ===
The district features the Advanced Materials and Technologies Centre, one of the largest high tech research facilities in Poland, located in Grabów at 19 Poleczki Street. Additionally, the neighbourhood of Stary Imielin includes the Maria Skłodowska-Curie National Research Institute of Oncology at 5 Roentgena Street, and the Institute of Haematology and Transfusion Medicine at 14 Indiry Gandhi Street, as well as the Southern Hospital at 99 Pileckiego Street.

== Culture ==
Ursynów has several cultural centers and libraries, as well as two cinemas. It also features aseveral historical buildings, such as the Krasiński Palace from 1858, and the St. Catherine Church from 1848. Additionally, is also has the Fort VIII, decommissioned 19th-century military fortifications, currently repurposed as a shopping centre. In the southeast is also located the Janówek Villa, a historical 20th-century residence, which currently hosts plethora of cultural events, such as Floralia Muzyczne classical music festival, organized by the Frédéric Chopin Society. Furthermore, the campus of the Warsaw University of Life Sciences hosts annually the Ursynalia, one of the largest music festivals in Poland.

The district also features works of public art, including the Ursynów Sculptures, a series of twelve artworks made in various techniques by several artists, displayed around the North Ursynów neighbourhood.

== Nature and geography ==
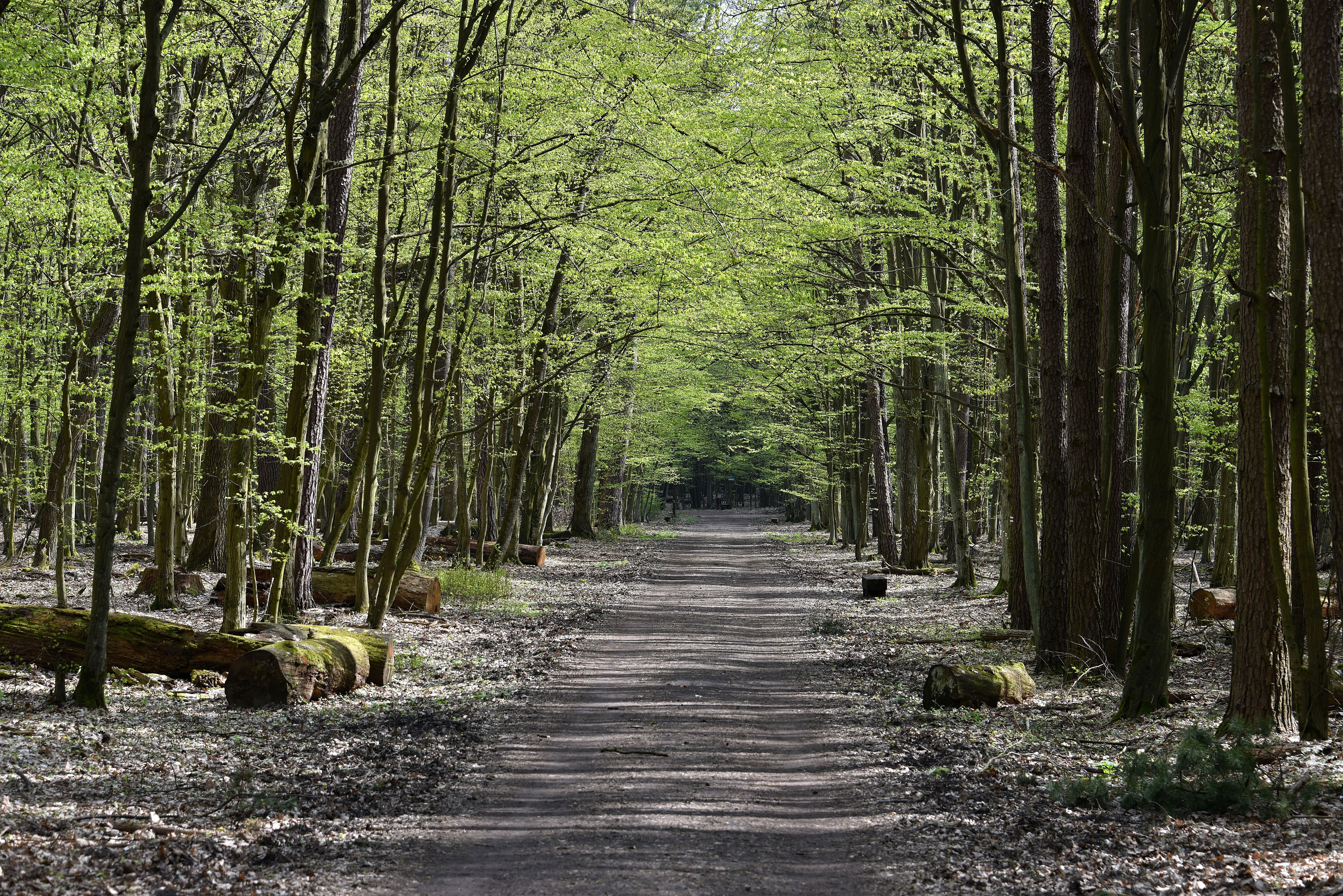
A road in the Kabaty Woods, the largest nature reserve in Warsaw.

Ursynów has two large nature reserves, including the Kabaty Woods in the southeast, which, with an area of 903 ha, forms the largest forest in the city, and the largest nature reserve in the Masovian Voivodeship. The other ks Ursynów Escarpment in the northeast, a woodland and swamp with an area of 20 ha. The eastern boundary of the district is marked by the Warsaw Escarpment.

Ursynów also features numerous lakes and ponds. Among the largest are: Czyste, Imielin Lake, Grabów Lake, Kądziołeczka, Krzewiny, Pozytywka, Wyścigi Pond, Zabłocki Lake, and Zgorzała, and the district is also crossed by the Służewiec Stream, and artificial canals such as Grabów and Imielin.

A pedunculate oak named Mieszko I, that grows near Nowoursynowska Street, has around 600 years, making it one of oldest trees in Poland. Additionally, within Kozłowski Park is also placed the Ursynów Boulder (Polish: Głaz Ursynowski), which, with the height of 2.62 m, and circumference of 11.1 m, is the largest glacial erratic in the city. Additionally, sithin the district are present mounds, built in the 1970s, the Cwil Mound in the Kozłowski Park, with the height of 118 m, and Three Peaks Hill in the Silent Unseen Park, with the height of 113.9 m above mean sea level.

== Parks and recreation ==
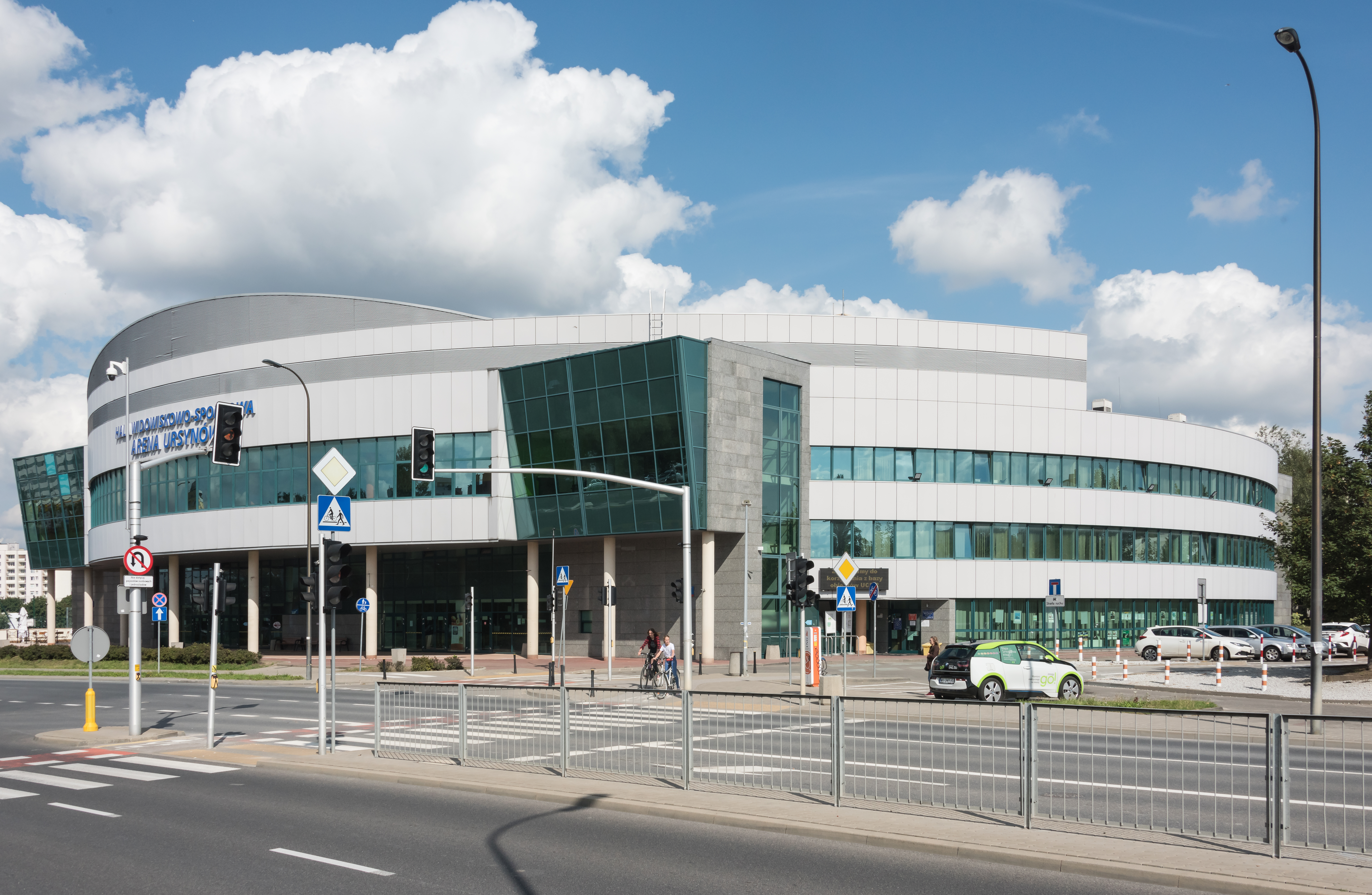
The Arena Ursynów indoor sports stadium.

Ursynów has several public parks, such as John Paul II Park, Kozłowski Park, Przy Bażantarni Park, and Silent Unseen Park. In the southeast, near the Kabaty Woods, is also located the Polish Academy of Sciences Botanical Garden and Powsin Centre for Biological Diversity Conservation, which has an area of 40 ha, and features over 10,000 species of plants in its collection, including numerous exotic and rare examples. It is also a research facility of the Polish Academy of Sciences. Nearby is also present a recreational and sports area of the Powsin Culture Park.

In 2021, 38 sports clubs operating as associations and foundations, as well as 5 commercial clubs, were registered in Ursynów. This includes the association football club KS SEMP Warszawa (also known as SEMP Ursynów). The area also includes the Arena Ursynów indoor sports stadium, located at 122 Pileckiego Street.

The district also features the Służewiec Racecourse at 266 Puławska Street, with two race circuits, a primary turf track with the length of 2,300 m (1.4 miles) and a secondary dirt track with the length of 1,930 m (1.2 miles). Every year, the venue hosts the Great Warsaw Race, the most prestigious horse race in Poland.

== Transport ==
The district has five stations of the M1 line of Warsaw Metro rapid transit underground system. They are: Imielin, Kabaty, Natolin, Stokłosy, and Ursynów. It also has the Kabaty Technical and Parking Station, a motive power depot for the metro system.

Within Ursynów are also present three railway stations, operated by the Polish State Railways. This includes Warszawa Jeziorki and Warszawa Dawidy, at the railway line no. 8, between Warsaw West and Kraków Main stations, and Warszawa Okęcie, which provides transit links with the Warsaw Chopin Airport in the nearby Włochy district.

The area is additionally crossed by several motorways. The expressway S79 runs alongside its western boundary, connecting Mokotów to the Warsaw Chopin Airport and the Expressway S7 on the north–south axis. It intersects with Expressway S2, leading east to Wilanów and Expressway S17. Part of it includes a tunnel with a length of 2.3 km (1.4 miles). It also intersects with the national road 79, formed by Puławska Street.

== Symbols ==
The symbols of Ursynów were adopted in 1995. Its coat of arms depicts a red castle, with a red open gate featurung black bars, and two red towers on each side with black roofs. On the top of the gate sits a black bear, standing on its back feet, and facing to its left. It holds a red rose. The building stands on a green field and in front of a yellow background. The coat of arms has an Iberian-style escutcheon (shield) with a square top and rounded base. The animal refers to the coat of arms of the heraldic clan of Rawa, which also depicts a black bear. It refers to Julian Ursyn Niemcewicz, the member of the clan, who in 1822, bought the Krasiński Palace, and renamed his estate to Ursynów, after his family conomen.

The flag is a rectangle, divided into 3 horizontal stripes, that are, from top to bottom, navy blue, yellow, and red. Its aspect ratio of the height to the width, was described in the establishing resolution as 100:99, although in practice, such proportions are not used. Instead, the flag is usually given the shape of a wider rectangle, with the proportions equal to 5:8. The proportion of the stripes to each other was described as equal to 26:7:7, however, those proportions also remain unused in practice. Instead, the flag is usually presented with a blue stripe two times bigger than the remaining two stripes, with the proportion equal to 2:1:1.
