= St. Catherine's Church, Warsaw =

- Kościół św. Katarzyny
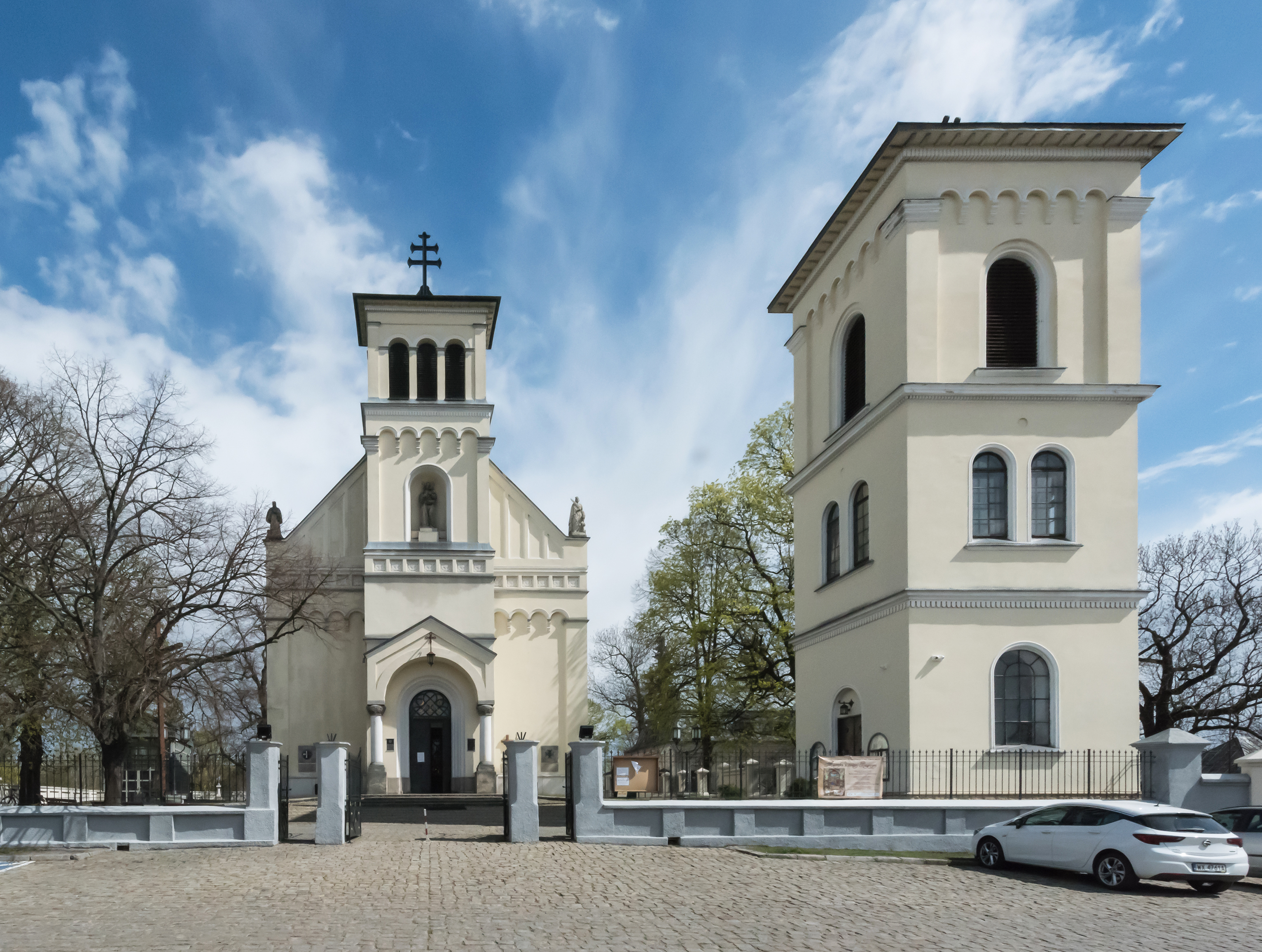
- St Catherine's Church, Warsaw

- 52.171944°N 21.044722°E
- Location: Warsaw
- Country: Poland
- Denomination: Roman Catholic

History
- Status: Parish church
- Dedication: Catherine of Alexandria

Architecture
- Functional status: Active
- Architect: Franciszek Maria Lanci
- Style: Neo-Romanesque
- Completed: 1848

Specifications
- Materials: brick

Administration
- Archdiocese: Warsaw
- Deanery: Ursynów
- Parish: St Catherine's in Warsaw

St. Catherine's Church (Polish: Kościół św. Katarzyny) is a Catholic parish church in Warsaw, Poland, in the district of Ursynów. The parish is the oldest existing parish, although not the oldest church, within the current borders of Warsaw. It was founded about half a century before Warsaw's Old Town.

== History ==
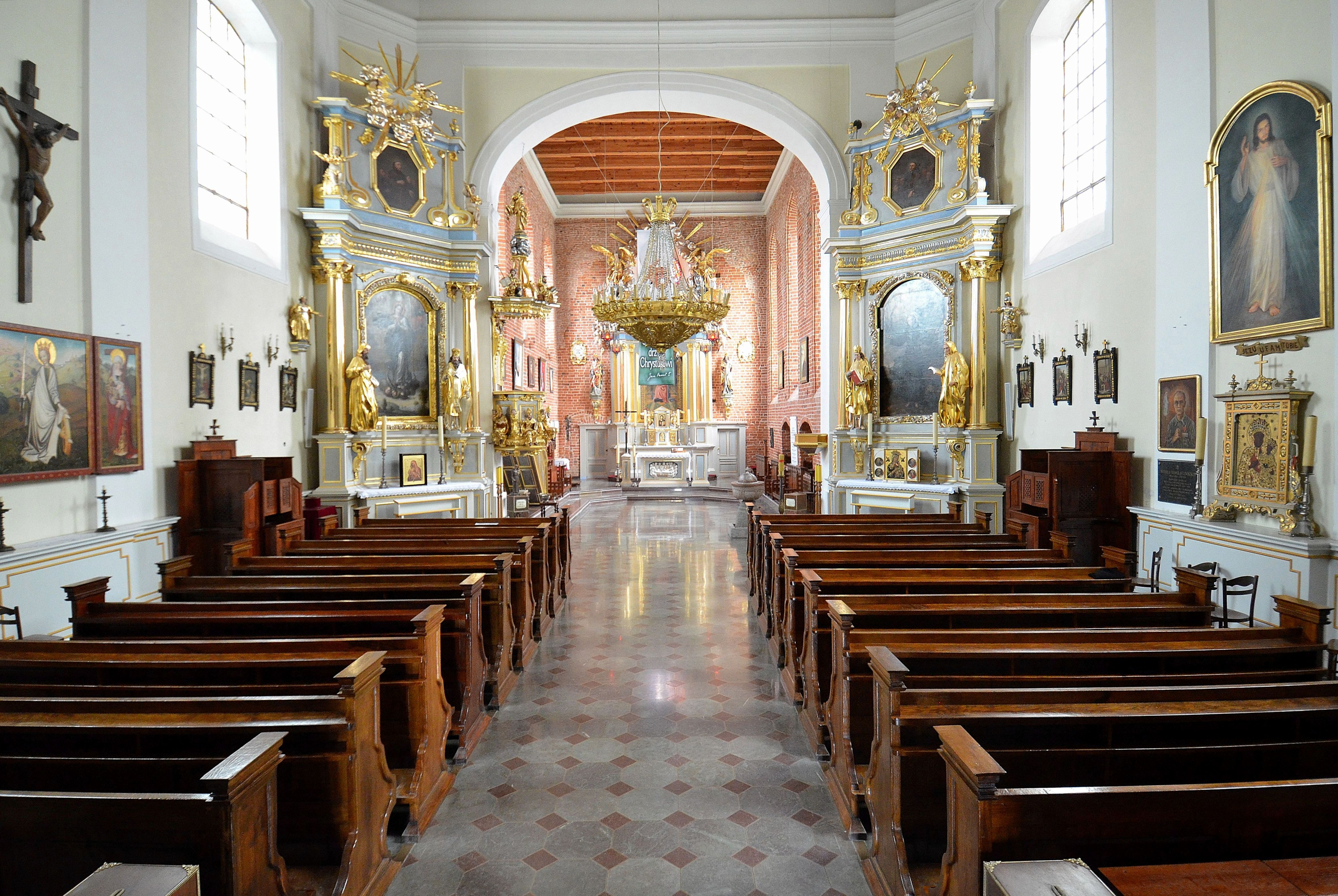
Church interior

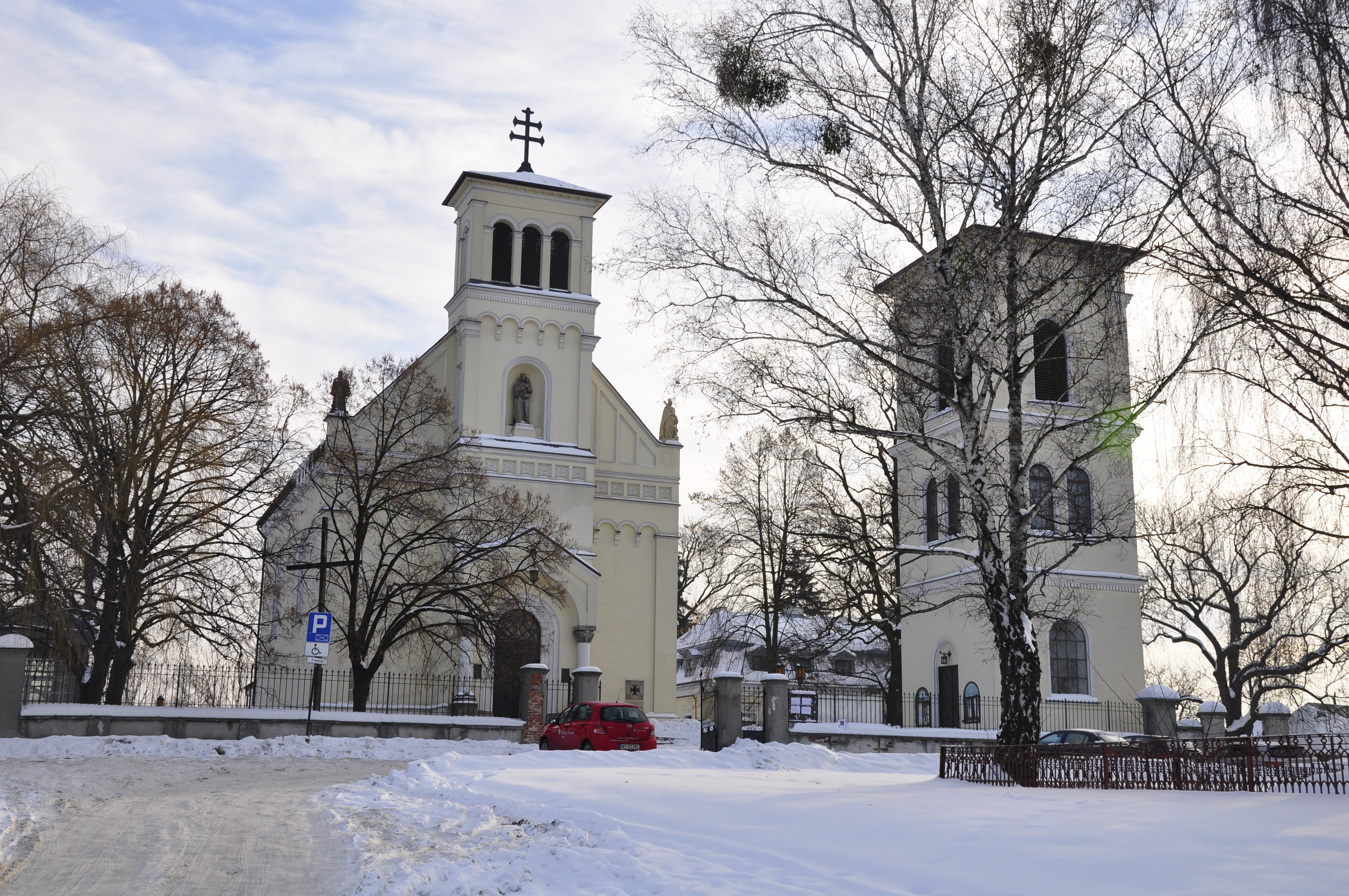
Church with separate bell tower

There was already a Benedictine missionary center in the Służew area by 1065. The parish of St Catherine was founded in 1238 by Duke Konrad I of Masovia and the Bishop of Poznań, Paweł Bniński. Until the 18th century, the church was subject to the Diocese of Poznań, then changed to the Diocese of Warsaw.

From 1245 to the 18th century, the patrons of the church and parish were the Służewskis (Radwan), then the property was acquired by the owners of Wilanów. Then, until 1945, the church patrons were, in succession, the Czartoryskis, the Potockis and the Branickis.

The parish included a parish school run by the Congregation of Marian Fathers, and until 1945, the parish functioned as a nursing home for the elderly and the physically disabled as well as an orphanage. It also operated a small hospital for the poor.

Not much is known about the first church building, archaeological surveys on the parish grounds confirm that the hill was a pagan shrine. The layer of burnt earth indicates that a fire burned continuously for several hundred years, so the first church building may have been a former pagan shrine. A wooden church was built in the 13th century and later in the Middle Ages a brick church was built in Masovian Gothic style. It was rebuilt in 1742 by Prince August Aleksander Czartoryski and depicted in paintings by Bernardo Bellotto and Wincenty Kasprzycki (pl). Finally it was rebuilt in 1848 in a neo-Romanesque style by Franciszek Maria Lanci (pl).

The interior of the church was destroyed during the Swedish invasion of Poland and it was re-decorated by the Warsaw sculptor Jan Jerzy Plersch in a Warsaw baroque style. In 1987 additional sculptures were made by a group from the Academy of Fine Arts in Warsaw led by Andrzej Koss. The church is adorned with other sculptures and paintings from various periods: medieval, renaissance, and 19th-century eclectic from the 1830s. Portraits, painted using the blessed oil technique associated with the local parish, are located on the side walls of the chancel. Two are of martyrs killed by the Nazis during World War II, Blessed Edward Detkens and Blessed Michał Czartoryski, and the third is of Pope John Paul II. They were painted by Jerzy Maciejowski, a graduate of the Academy of Fine Arts. Another painting by Maciejowski is located on the right side of the church's nave.

The current bell tower was erected on the site of a previous one in 1881, and survived World War II (like the church, rectory and curacy). It has five bells - one from the 16th century, one from the 18th century, one from the early 20th century, and two from 1992.

The rectory dates from 1640 and contains a preserved clay floor from the 17th century in its lobby.

The Monument to the Victims of Communist Terror 1944-1956 (pl), by Maciej Szańkowski (pl) and Slawomir Korzeniewski, is located in the churchyard, on the site where, from 1945 to 1947, the Ministry of Public Security buried up to 2000 victims of political murders carried out at Mokotów Prison.

In 1992, caves below the surface of the hill were declared a natural monument and are a habitat for many bat species. Also, some very old trees grow on the parish grounds including a 300-year-old linden tree and a 300-year-old plane tree.

== Parish ==
The Parish of St Catherine in Warsaw is a Roman Catholic parish forming part of the Ursynów deanery, and was founded in 1238, making it the oldest parish in Mazovia.

== Bibliography ==
- Maj, Józef R. (1994). Kościół św. Katarzyny, Warszawa. Kościoły w Polsce (in Polish). Vol. 11. Warszawa: Ornament. ISBN 83-900979-6-6. ISSN 1232-5171.
- Dąbrowska, Maria; Bis, Magdalena; Bis, Wojciech (2012). "Badania archeologiczne kościoła św. Katarzyny i cmentarza na warszawskim Służewie". Ad Rem: kwartalnik akademicki (in Polish). 2012 (1–2). Warszawa: Uniwersytet Warszawski. Międzywydziałowe Towarzystwo Naukowe Badań i Ochrony Swiatowego Dziedzictwa Kulturowego "HUMANICA". ISSN 1899-0495.
- Dacka-Górzyńska, Iwona M. (2012). "Inskrypcje w kościole św. Katarzyny na Służewie". Ad Rem: kwartalnik akademicki (in Polish). 2012 (1–2). Warszawa: Uniwersytet Warszawski. Międzywydziałowe Towarzystwo Naukowe Badań i Ochrony Swiatowego Dziedzictwa Kulturowego "HUMANICA". ISSN 1899-0495.
- Korpysz, Ewa (2012). "Przemiany w architekturze kościoła św. Katarzyny na Służewie". Ad Rem: kwartalnik akademicki (in Polish). 2012 (1–2). Warszawa: Uniwersytet Warszawski. Międzywydziałowe Towarzystwo Naukowe Badań i Ochrony Swiatowego Dziedzictwa Kulturowego "HUMANICA". ISSN 1899-0495.
- Maj, Józef R. (2012). "Poczet probosczców służewskich". Ad Rem: kwartalnik akademicki (in Polish). 2012 (1–2). Warszawa: Uniwersytet Warszawski. Międzywydziałowe Towarzystwo Naukowe Badań i Ochrony Swiatowego Dziedzictwa Kulturowego "HUMANICA". ISSN 1899-0495.
- Piber-Zbieranoska, Marta (2012). "Parafia służewska w średniowieczu". Ad Rem: kwartalnik akademicki (in Polish). 2012 (1–2). Warszawa: Uniwersytet Warszawski. Międzywydziałowe Towarzystwo Naukowe Badań i Ochrony Swiatowego Dziedzictwa Kulturowego "HUMANICA". ISSN 1899-0495.
