= Flag of Ursynów =

Ursynów
- Proportion: 100:99 (de jure); 5:8 (de facto)
- Adopted: 14 February 1995

The flag that serves as the symbol of Ursynów, a quarter of the city of Warsaw, Poland, is divided into 3 horizontal stripes: navy blue, yellow, and red, with the blue stripe being bigger than the remaining two. The flag was established on 14 February 1995, as the symbol of the municipality of Warsaw–Ursynów, and since 27 October 2002, served as the symbol of the district of Ursynów, that replaced the municipality.

== Design ==
The flag of Ursynów, with the proportions as described in the establishing resolution.

The flag of Ursynów is divided into 3 horizontal stripes, that are, from the top to bottom, navy blue, yellow, and red. The aspect ratio of the height to the width of the flag, was described in the establishing resolution as 100:99, although in practice, such proportions aren't used. Instead, the flag is usually given the shape of a wider rectangle, with the proportions equal to 5:8. The proportion of the stripes to each other was described as equal to 26:7:7, however, those proportions also remain unused in practice. Instead, the flag is usually presented with a blue stripe two times bigger than the remaining two stripes, with the proportion equal to 2:1:1.

The yellow and red stripes reference the flag of Warsaw, while the meaning behind the blue stripe remains unknown.

== History ==
The flag was adopted on 14 February 1995, as the flag of the municipality of Warsaw–Ursynów. On 27 October 2002, the municipality was replaced by the quarter of Ursynów, that continues to use the flag to the present day.

== See also ==
- coat of arms of Ursynów
- flag of Warsaw
- list of flags of the districts of Warsaw
