= Coat of arms of Ursynów =

- Armiger: Ursynów (2002–present); Gmina Warsaw–Ursynów (1995–2002)
- Adopted: 14 February 1995

The coat of arms that serves as the symbol of Ursynów, a quarter of the city of Warsaw, Poland, depicts a red castle with an open gate, and two towers with red roofs, placed on a yellow background, and standing on a green field. It includes a bear holding a rose, stating on a gate. The coat of arms was established on 14 February 1995, as the symbol of the municipality of Warsaw–Ursynów, and since 27 October 2002, serves as the symbol of the district of Ursynów, that replaced the municipality.

== Design ==
The coat of arms depicts a red castle, consisting of a red open gate with black bars, and two red towers on each side with black roofs. On the top of the gate is a black bear, standing on its back feet, and facing to the left. It holds a red rose. The building stands on a green field, and behind a yellow background. The coat of arms has an Iberian style escutcheon with square top and rounded base.

The bear refers to the coat of arms of the heraldic clan of Rawa, that also depicts a black bear. It refers to Julian Ursyn Niemcewicz, the member of the clan, that in 1822, bought Ursynów, naming it after his family name. The castle symbolizes the city of Warsaw, that Ursynów is a part of. The red colour of the building, and a yellow colour of the background, refer to the flag of Warsaw, that consists of yellow and red horizontal stripes. The open gate symbolizes the hospitality of the inhabitants of the district. The green field below the castle symbolizes the district greenery, and refer to its past, when it consisted of villages and farm fields.

== History ==
The coat of arms had been designed by the group of specialists, that included Jerzy Nowosielski and Andrzej Kulikowski. It was established on 14 February 1995, as the coat of arms of the municipality of Warsaw–Ursynów. On 27 October 2002, the municipality had been replaced by the district of Ursynów, that continues to use the coat of arms to the present day.

== See also ==
- flag of Ursynów
- coat of arms of Warsaw
