= Warszawa Mokotów railway station =

Former railway station in Warsaw, Poland

Warszawa Mokotów
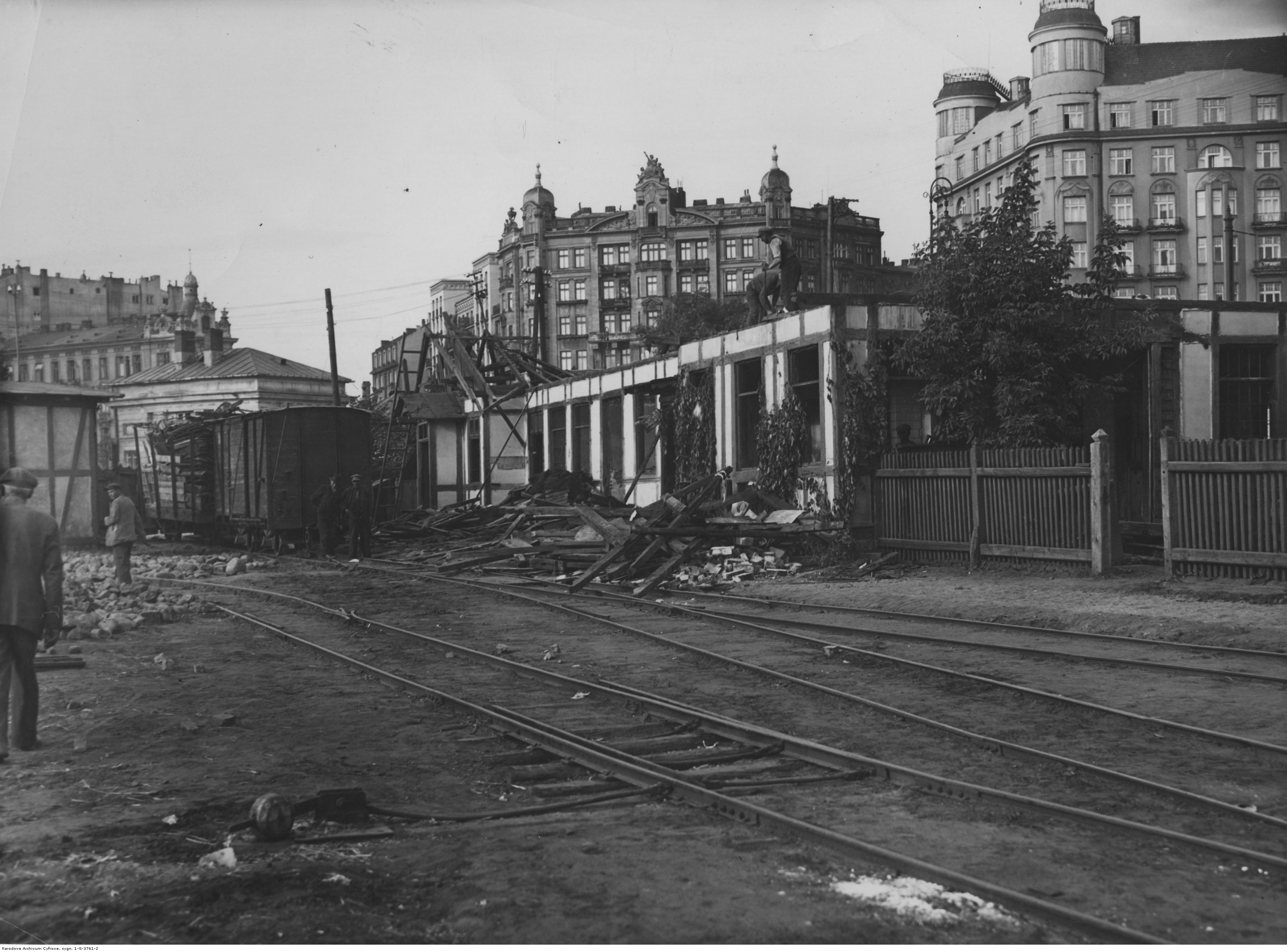
- The demolition of the station in 1935

General information
- Location: Union of Lublin Square, Warsaw (1892–1935); Puławska Street/Odyńca Street, Warsaw (1935–1938); Poland
- Coordinates: 52°12′46″N 21°01′12″E
- Train operators: Wilanów Railway; Grójec Commuter Railway

History
- Opened: 1892
- Closed: 1938
- Former names: Warszawa (1892–1930)
Location

Warszawa Mokotów (Warsaw Mokotów), until 1930 known simply as Warszawa (Warsaw), was a narrow-gauge railway station in Warsaw, Poland, located at the Union of Lublin Square. It was a turning station of two lines operated by the Wilanów Railway, and one line of the Grójec Commuter Railway. It was opened in 1892, and in 1935, it was moved the intersection of Puławska and Odyńca Streets, where it operated until 1938.

== History ==
In 1892, next to the Union of Lublin Square, between Puławska and Chocimska Streets, was opened the Warszawa (Warsaw) narrow-gauge railway station. It was a terminal station of two lines operated by the Wilanów Railway, one to leading to Piaseczno, and other to station Warszawa Główna Wąskotorowa in the city centre. In 1898, there was also added a line of the Grójec Commuter Railway, leading to Nowe Miasto nad Pilicą. In 1930, it was renamed to Warszawa (Mokotów), and in 1933, to Warszawa Mokotów, in reference to the nearby town of Mokotów. The station was moved in 1935 further south, to the intersection of Puławska and Odyńca Streets, where it operated until 1938. After that, its role was fulfilled by the Warszawa Południowa station.

In 1962, at the site of the former station was opened Supersam, a first supermarket in Poland. It was considered a notable example of the modern architecture in Poland. It was deconstructed in 2006, and in 2013, in its place was opened the Plac Unii skyscraper, that serves as an office building and a shopping centre.
