= Krasiński Palace (Ursynów) =

Palace in Warsaw, Poland

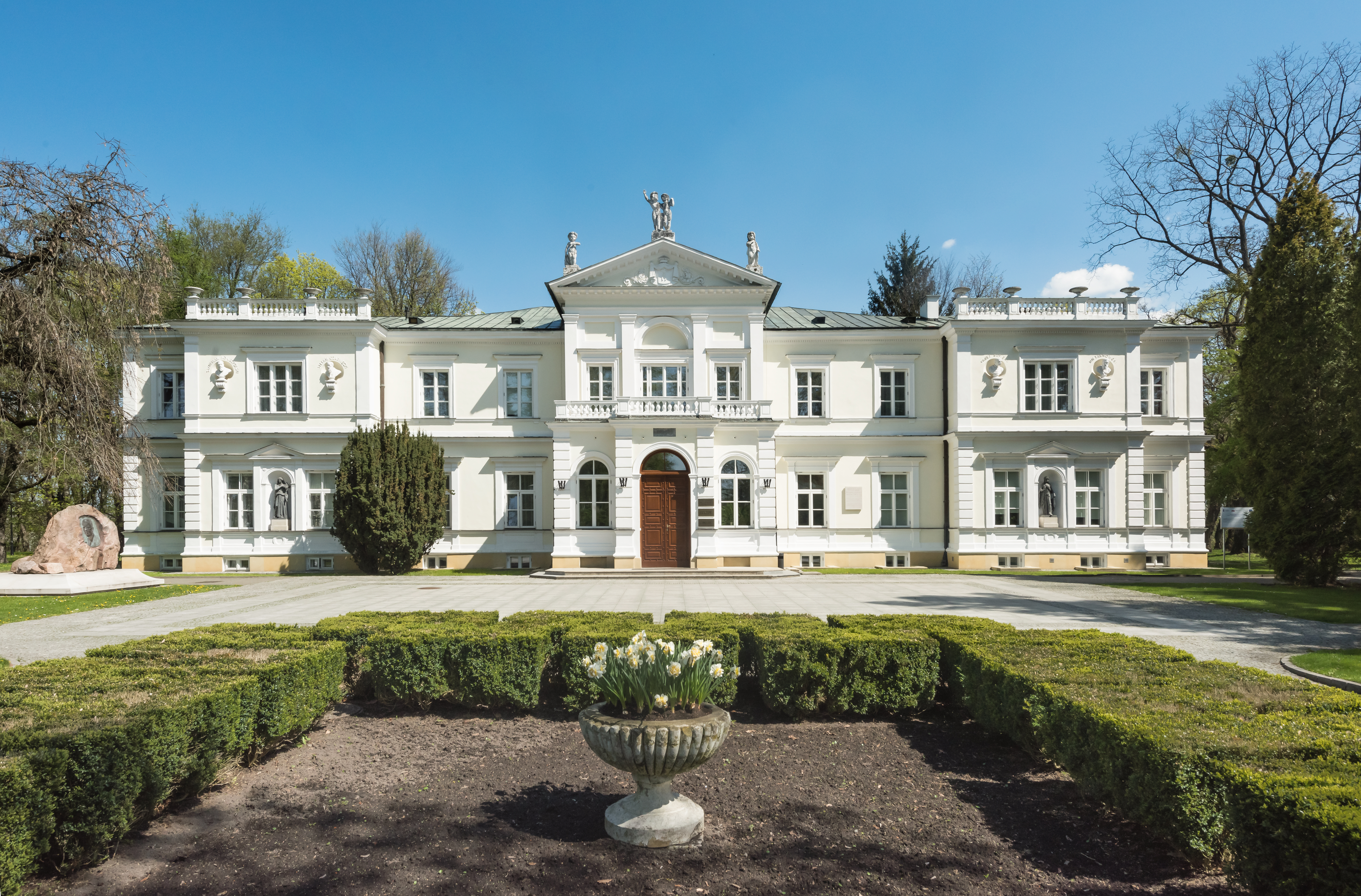
- The Krasiński Palace in 2023.
- Interactive map of the Krasiński Palace area

General information
- Architectural style: Renaissance Revival
- Location: Warsaw, Poland, 166 Nowoursynowska Street
- Coordinates: 52°09′53″N 21°03′02″E
- Completed: 1776 (original building); 1860 (current building)

Technical details
- Floor count: 2

Design and construction
- Architect: Zygmunt Rospendowski

The Krasiński Palace, (Note: Polish pronunciation: [kraˈɕiɲ.ski]; Polish: Pałac Krasińskich) also known as the Ursynów Palace (Note: Polish pronunciation: [urˈsɘ̟n.uf]; Polish: Pałac Ursynowski) and the Delight Palace, (Note: Polish: Pałac Rozkosz) is a Renaissance Revival palace in Warsaw, Poland, located at 166 Nowoursynowska Street in the Ursynów district.

It was built in its current form between 1858 and 1860 for the Krasiński family to a design by architect Zygmunt Rospendowski. The original palace was built there in 1776 for the Potocki family. It is part of the campus of the Warsaw University of Life Sciences.

== History ==
A small palace, originally known as the Delight Palace (Polish: Pałac Rozkosz) was constructed in 1776, and commissioned by princess Elżbieta Izabela Lubomirska, as a wedding gift for her daughter, Aleksandra Lubomirska, and son-in-law Stanisław Kostka Potocki. For some time it was inhabited by Józef Maisonneuve, and from 1785 to 1799, it was the residence of the Potocki family. Kostka Potocki had expanded the palace, with plans drown by architect Chrystian Piotr Aigner. It was later owned by Grzegorz Wykowski, and still later, by Ignacy Kochanowski.

From 1822 it was the residence of writer Julian Ursyn Niemcewicz. He renamed it the Ursynów Palace after himself, which inspired the name of the modern city district of Ursynów. Originally he had considered instead the names "America" (Polish: Ameryka) and "Washington" (Polish: Waszyngton) in commemoration of his stay in the United States. He organised there a library including rare and valuable books.

Between 1832 and 1840, it was leased by physician Jan Fryderyk Wilhelm Malcz, and later was briefly owned by the Potocki family. From 1857 it belonged to the Krasiński family.

The palace was completely rebuilt between 1858 and 1860. It was redesigned in the Renaissance Revival style by architect Zygmunt Rospendowski. The façade was decorated with reliefs by Faustyn Juliusz Cengler, depicting Grand Guardian of the Crown of Polish–Lithuanian Commonwealth: Stanisław Koniecpolski, Stefan Czarniecki, Paweł Jan Sapieha, and Jan Tarnowski. In the niches were placed the sculptures of Fortuna and Ceres, goddesses from Greek mythology. The tympanum included the Ślepowron coat of arms (symbol of Krasiński family), and sculptures of children, symbolising four seasons of the year.

In 1857, the Ursynów estate, including the palace, was property of Eliza Branicka, wife of the poet Zygmunt Krasiński, and after his death, wife of economist Ludwik Józef Krasiński. Following her death, her second husband remained the owner until his death in 1895. It was inherited by writer Adam Krasiński, who in 1906, gave it for the usage of the Polish Educational Society, which organised there educational institutions. In 1921, the palace was inherited by Edward Bernard Raczyński, who then donated it to the Ministry of Religious Affairs and Public Education.

It was parcially destroyed by the Russian Imperial Army during the First World War.

In 1956, the Council of Ministers have given the palace, and the surrounding area, to the Warsaw University of Life Sciences, which had developed there their campus. In 1989, the palace became the seat of the university authorities.

Its façade was renovated in 2008, and the building underwent extensive renovation between 2014 and 2017.

== Characteristics ==
The building is a two-storey Renaissance Revival palace. Its façade is decorated with reliefs by Faustyn Juliusz Cengler, depicting Grand Guardian of the Crown of Polish–Lithuanian Commonwealth: Stanisław Koniecpolski, Stefan Czarniecki, Paweł Jan Sapieha, and Jan Tarnowski. In the niches are placed the sculptures of Fortuna and Ceres, goddesses from Greek mythology, and its tympanum includes the Ślepowron coat of arms (symbol of Krasiński family), and sculptures of children, symbolising four seasons of the year.

Located at 166 Nowoursynowska Street, it forms part of the campus of the Warsaw University of Life Sciences, and is the seat of its authorities.

Around the palace is a garden complex, which borders the Ursynów Escarpment Nature Reserve. It includes the Niemcewicz's Tree (Polish: Drzewo Niemcewicza), an over 200-years-old eastern American black walnut tree that has the status of the natural monument. Dating to the times of Julian Ursyn Niemcewicz, and being of the North American species, the tree is speculated to have been planted from the seeds that he had received from George Washington, the first president of the United States. Next to the palace is also located a small pond with an area of 0.146 ha.
