= Puławska Street, Warsaw =

Street in Warsaw, Poland

Coordinates: 52°09′33″N 21°01′04″E

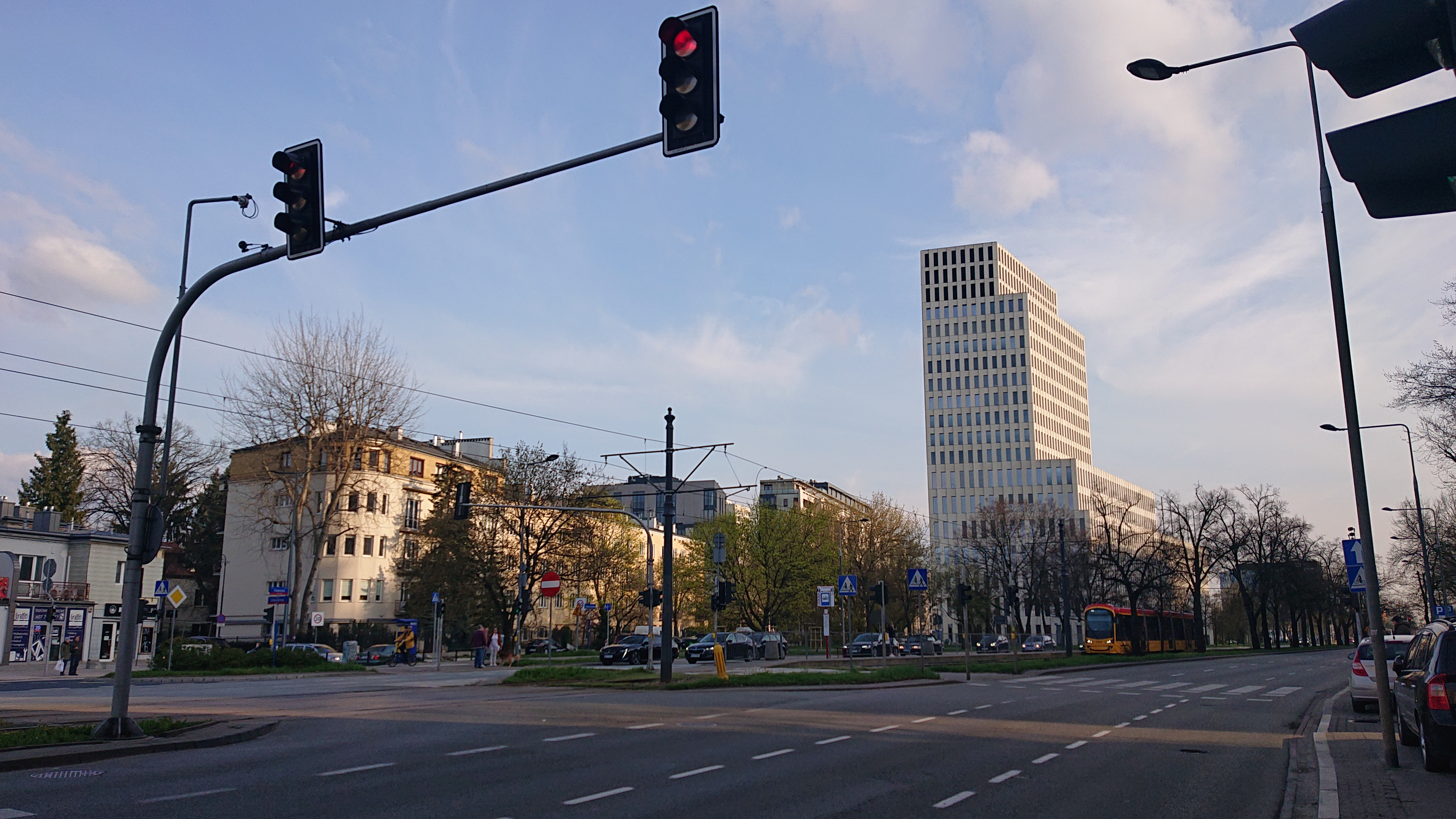
- Interactive map of Puławska Street, Warsaw
- Native name: ulica Puławska (Polish)
- Former names: Nowoaleksandryjska (?–1916); Feldherrnallee (occupation of Poland)
- Part of: DK 2 E 30 DK 79
- Namesake: Puławy
- Type: Dual carriageway
- Owner: Zarząd Dróg Miejskich
- Maintained by: Zarząd Dróg Miejskich
- Length: 12.3 km (7.6 mi); Additional 2 km in Piaseczno
- Area: Śródmieście Południowe, Stary Mokotów, Wierzbno, Ksawerów, Służew, Ursynów Północny, Grabów, Stary Imielin, Pyry, Dąbrówka, Mysiadło, Piaseczno
- Addresses: 1–621
- Location: Warsaw
- Nearest metro station: Wilanowska
- North end: Plac Unii Lubelskiej
- South end: Warsaw–Gmina Piaseczno border

Construction
- Inauguration: ca. 1825

Puławska Street (Polish: Ulica Puławska) is one of the main streets of the city of Warsaw, Poland. It links the southern City Centre and the southern boroughs of Mokotów and Ursynów with the suburb of Piaseczno.

The street is named after the city of Puławy, Poland.

== See also ==
- Puławy faction
