= Piaseczno–Grójec Narrow-Gauge Railway =

Heritage railway in Warsaw, Poland

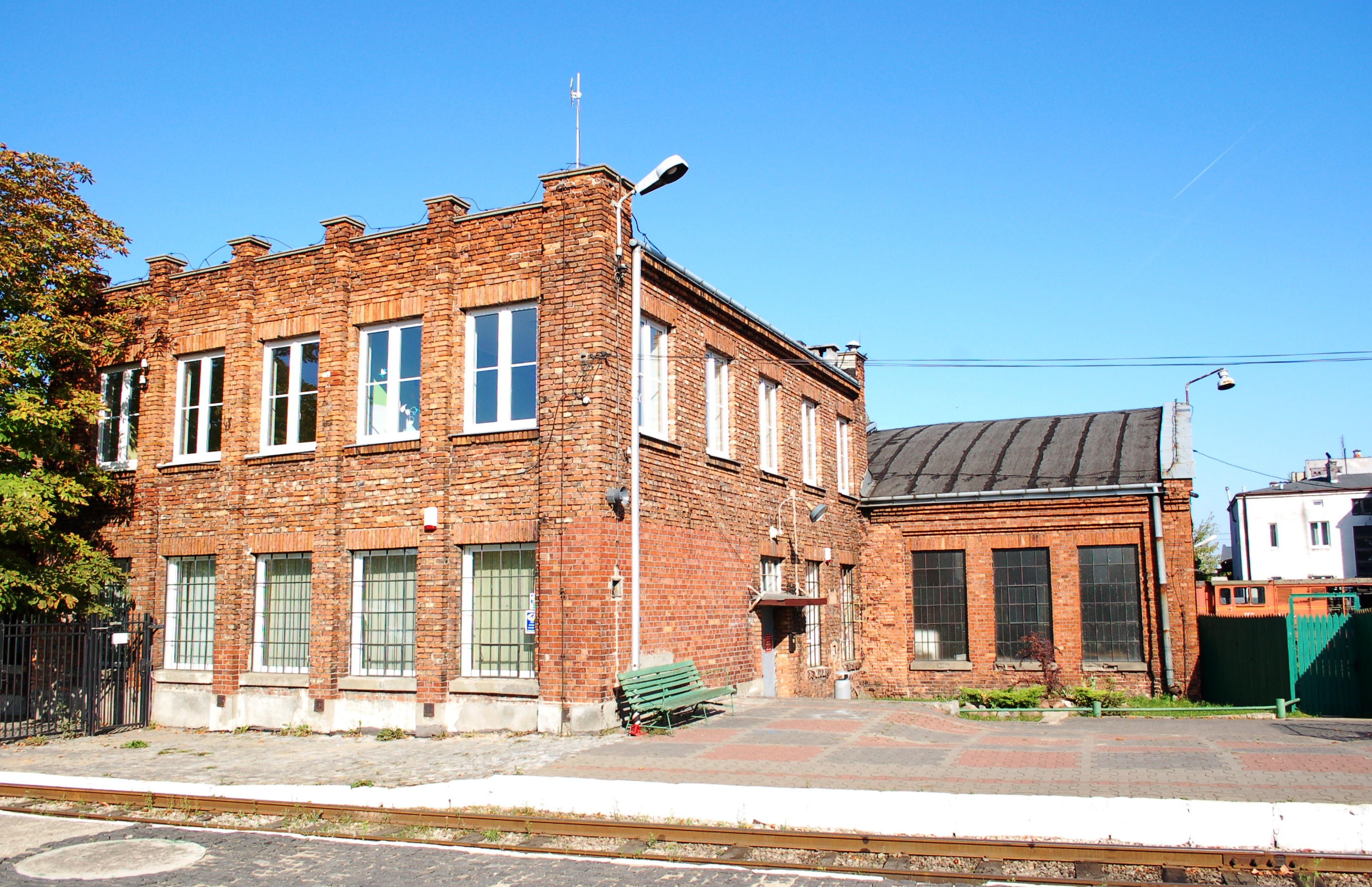
Piaseczno railway station

The Piaseczno–Grójec Narrow-Gauge Railway (Polish: Piaseczyńsko-Grójecka Kolej Wąskotorowa), until 2004 known as the Grójec Commuter Railway (Polish: Grójecka Kolej Dojazdowa), and colloquially known as the Grójec Line (Polish: Kolejka grójecka), is the tourist narrow-gauge railway service in Warsaw, Poland, operated by the Piaseczno–Grójec Narrow-Gauge Railway Society, with the metre-gauge railway (1,000 mm) line. It was originally opened in 1900, and operated as a local transit railway line in Warsaw and it suburbia. Currently, most of the historical lines has been closed, with the remaining stations serving as a tourist attraction.

== Proposed restoration ==
In November 2026, Port Polska submitted an application to the General Director for Environmental Protection in Warsaw for an environmental decision for the full revitalisation of the entire railway. The project involves upgrading the line to speeds of up to 100 km/h (62 mph), as well as the modernisation of its 13 stations. In return, passenger services would resume, with two major interchanges for other existing standard-gauge railways. New rolling stock would operate services and would be stabled and maintained at a new depot in Gołków. The decision is expected to be issued in 2027 or 2028.
