= Imielin, Warsaw =

Neighbourhood in Warsaw, Poland

Imielin
- Neighbourhood
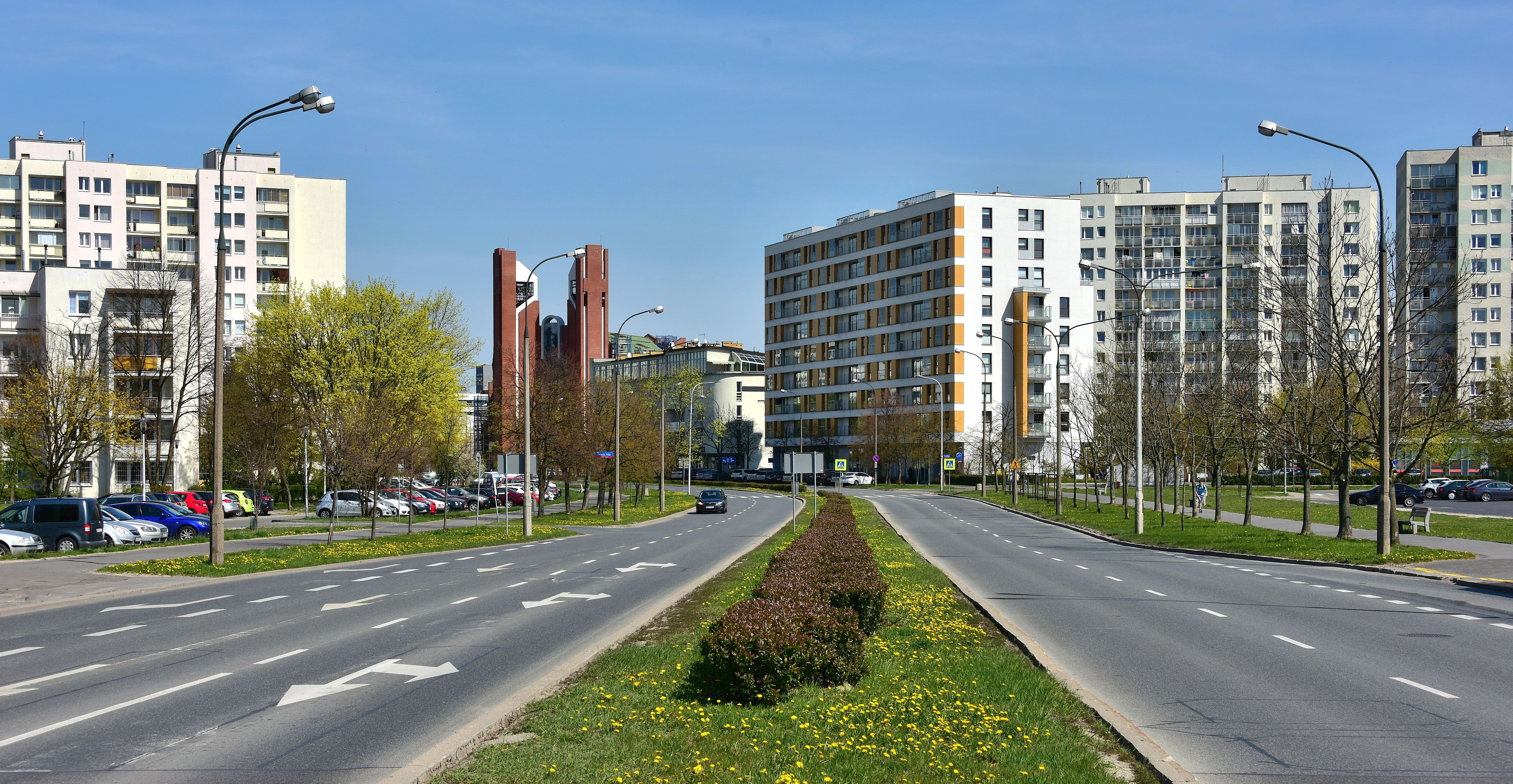
- The apartment buildings at Indiry Gandhi Street.
- Interactive map of Imielin
- Coordinates: 52°08′58″N 21°02′21″E
- Country: Poland
- Voivodeship: Masovian
- City and county: Warsaw
- District: Ursynów
- City Information System areas: Stary Imielin; Ursynów-Centrum
- Time zone: UTC+1 (CET)
  - Summer (DST): UTC+2 (CEST)
- Area code: +48 22

Imielin (Polish: [iˈmjɛ.lin]) is a neighbourhood in Warsaw, Poland, within the district of Ursynów. It consists of two housing estates composed of apartment buildings, West Ursynów and Imielin. The neighbourhood is divided into two City Information System areas, Stary Imielin and Ursynów-Centrum. The neighbourhood has several medical facilities, including Maria Skłodowska-Curie National Research Institute of Oncology, the Institute of Haematology and Transfusion Medicine, and the Southern Hospital. It also has Imielin station of the M1 line of the Warsaw Metro rapit transit system.

The oldest known records of the village of Imielin come from 1422. It was incorporated into Warsaw in 1951. Between 1976 and 1981, two housing estates, West Ursynów and Imielin, were developed in the area, consisting of apartment buildings. Between 1979 and 1997, the medical complex of the Maria Skłodowska-Curie National Research Institute of Oncology was built within the neighbourhood. In 1995, it was connected to the Warsaw Metro network.

== History ==
The oldest known records of Imielin come from 1422, when it was a small village located near the road connecting Warsaw and Piaseczno, now Puławska Street. Throughout history, it was known as Emilin, Imielino, Jamielin, Jemielin, and Jemielino, among other names. In 1445, the village received the Kulm law privileges from the duke Bolesław IV of Warsaw, ruler of the Duchy of Warsaw.

In the 16th century, Imielin was a property of the Służewiecki family. At its largest extent, the farmlands of the Imielin estate measured around 85 hectares. In the 17th century, the village became property of Jakub Hieronim Rozdrażewski, the voivode of the Inowrocław Voivodeship. At the time there were between 8 and 11 households.

In the late 18th century, Imielin, together with nearby Wyczółki, formed the estate owned by Grabowski, the deputy cup-bearer of Warsaw. Together they had 35 households. There were also founded Grabów and Pyry. Additionally in the 19th century, there were also established Grabówek, Krasnowola, and Ludwinów. Following the abolition of serfdom in 1864, in Imielin was incorporated into the municipality of Falenty, and 21 peasant-owned farms were founded in the area. In 1898, the Grabów Emilin narrow-gauge railway station was opened between Grabów and Imielin, at the current intersection of Puławska and Mysikrólika Streets. It was operated by the Grójec Commuter Railway, as part of a line between stations Warszawa Mokotów and Nowe Miasto nad Pilicą. It was closed down in 1957.

In 1905, Imielin had 23 households. In 1921, it was inhabited by 296 people, and in 1923, by 211 people. By 1931, the hamlet of Imielin Nowy was also present to the north, at Puławska Street, near the Służewiec Racecourse. Imielin was incorporated into the city of Warsaw on 14 May 1951.

Between 1976 and 1981, two housing estates, West Ursynów in the west, and Imielin in the east, were developed, consisting of apartment buildings. They were encompassed between Pileckiego Street, Ciszewskiego Street, Komisji Edukacji Narodowej Avenue, Płaskowickiej Street, and Puławska Street, and separated by Pileckiego Street.

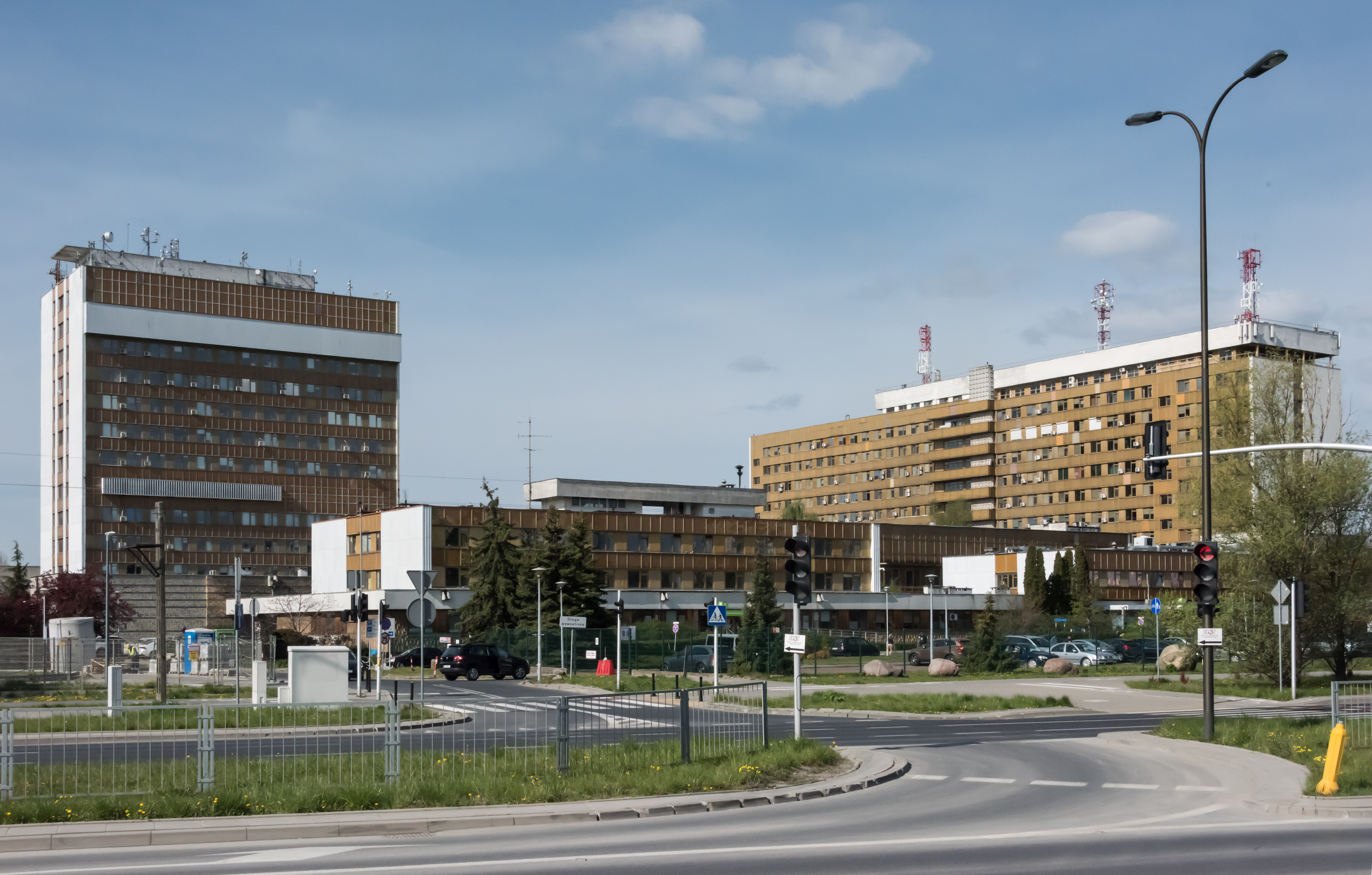
The complex of the Maria Skłodowska-Curie National Research Institute of Oncology, built between 1979 and 1984.

In 1979, the new headquarters and medical complex of the Maria Skłodowska-Curie National Research Institute of Oncology begun being constructed at 5 Roentgena Street. Its first portion was opened in 1984, with expansions being opened in the following years, and with the full completion in 1997. Additionally, in 1996, the Saint Christopher Oncological Hospice Foundation, which cares for cancer patients, and helps their families, was founded at 105 Pileckiego Street.

In 1995, the Imielin station of the M1 line of the Warsaw Metro rapid transit underground syststem, was opened at the intersection of Komisji Edukacji Narodowej Avenue and Indiry Gandhi Street.

Between 1995 and 2001, the Thomas the Apostle Church, which belongs to the Catholic denomination, was constructed at 12 Dereniowa Street.

In 1998, the district of Ursynów was subdivided into the areas of the City Information System. Imielin, became one of them, encompassing the housing estates of Imielin, Na Skraju, and West Ursynów. In 2000, it was divided into two areas, separated by Pileckiego Street. Its western portion, which includgled West Ursynów, became Stary Imielin, and the esteren portion, which included Imielin and Na Skraju, became Ursynów-Centrum.

In 2006, the headquarters of the Institute of Haematology and Transfusion Medicine were built at 14 Indiry Gandhi Street. In 2007, the Arena Ursynów indoor sports stadium was opened at 122 Pileckiego Street. In 2008, Ursynów Town Hall, the seat of district government, was opened at 61 Komisji Edukacji Narodowej Avenue. In 2021, the Southern Hospital was opened at 99 Pileckiego Street.

== Characteristics ==
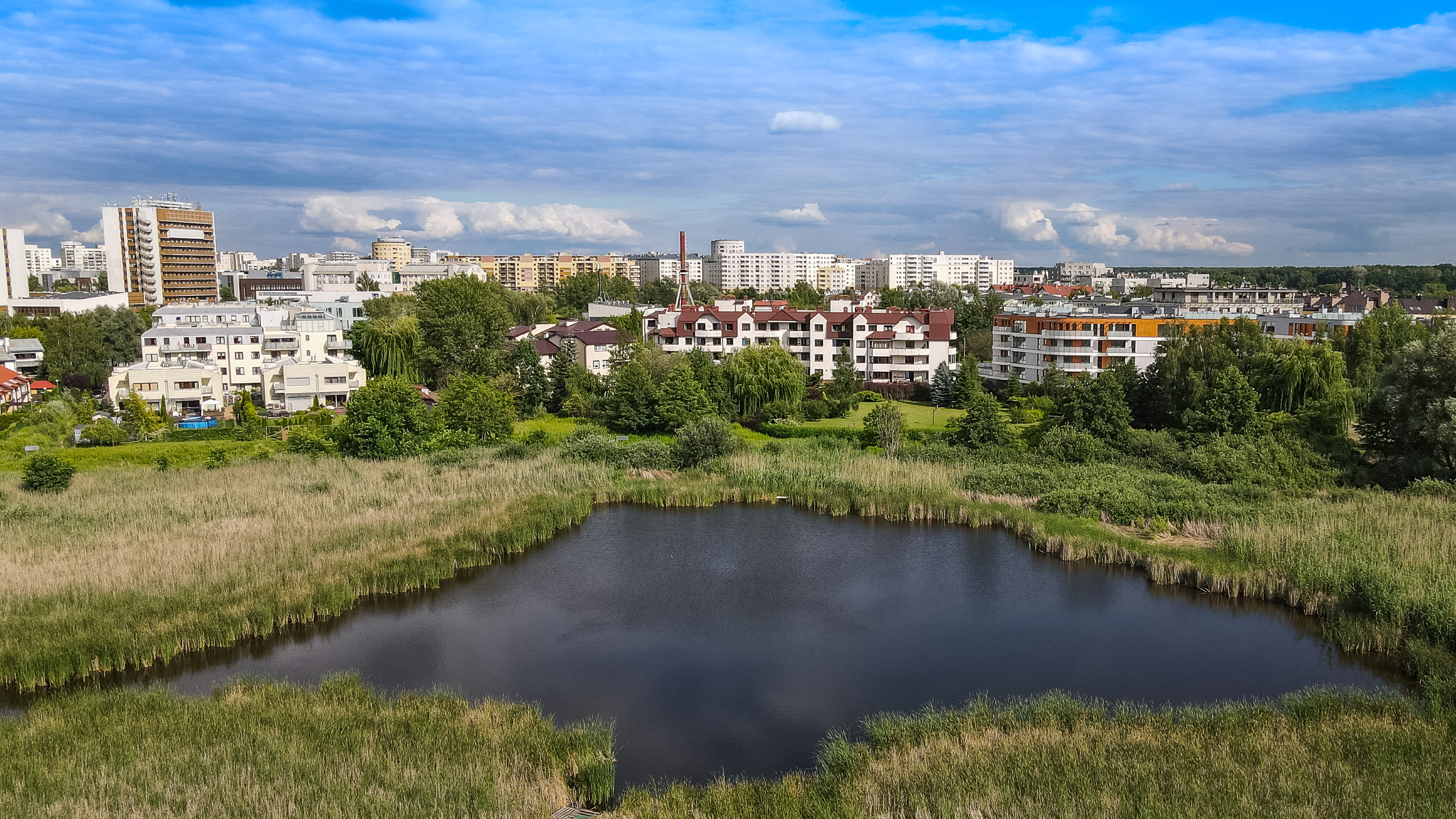
The Imielin Lake.

Imelin is formed by two housing estates, West Ursynów (also known as Stary Imielin) in the west, and Imielin in the east, consisting of high-rise apartment buildings. They are encompassed between Pileckiego Street, Ciszewskiego Street, Komisji Edukacji Narodowej Avenue, Płaskowickiej Street, and Puławska Street, and separated by Pileckiego Street. A small portion of the neighbourhood also includes low-rise single family housing. The area includes the Imielin station of the M1 line of the Warsaw Metro rapid transit underground system, located at the intersection of Komisji Edukacji Narodowej Avenue and Indiry Gandhi Street.

Numerous medical facilities are located in the eastern portion of West Ursynów, including Maria Skłodowska-Curie National Research Institute of Oncology at 5 Roentgena Street, the Institute of Haematology and Transfusion Medicine at 14 Indiry Gandhi Street, and the Southern Hospital at 99 Pileckiego Street. The Saint Christopher Oncological Hospice Foundation, which cares for cancer patients, and helps their families, also operated at 105 Pileckiego Street,

The neighbourhood also includes the Thomas the Apostle Church at 12 Dereniowa Street, whuch belongs to the Catholic denomination, and the Arena Ursynów indoor sports stadium at opened at 122 Pileckiego Street. Additionally, the Ursynów Town Hall, located at 61 Komisji Edukacji Narodowej Avenue, houses the seat of the district government. Furthermore, the headquarters of the National Clearing House, an institution of the banking sector in Poland, are located at 65 Pileckiego Street within the neighbourhood.

The central portion of the neighbourhood features the Imielin Lake, from which outflows the Imielin Canal. It connects to the Grabów Canal in the northwestern part of Stary Imielin.
