= Imielin (disambiguation) =

Imielin is a town in the Silesian Voivodeship, Poland.

Imielin may also refer to:

- Imielin, Warsaw, a neighbourhood in Warsaw, Poland
  - Imielin (housing estate), a housing estate in Warsaw, Poland
  - Imielin metro station in Warsaw, Poland
  - Stary Imielin (Old Imielin), a neighbourhood in Warsaw, Poland
- Imielin railway station in Imielin, Silesian Voivodeship, Poland
- Imielin-Jazd, a neighbourhood of Imielin, Silesian Voivodeship, Poland
- Imielin, a part of the village of Obory in the Masovian Voivodeship, Poland
