= Stary Imielin =

Neighbourhood in Warsaw, Poland

- City Information System area (neighbourhood)
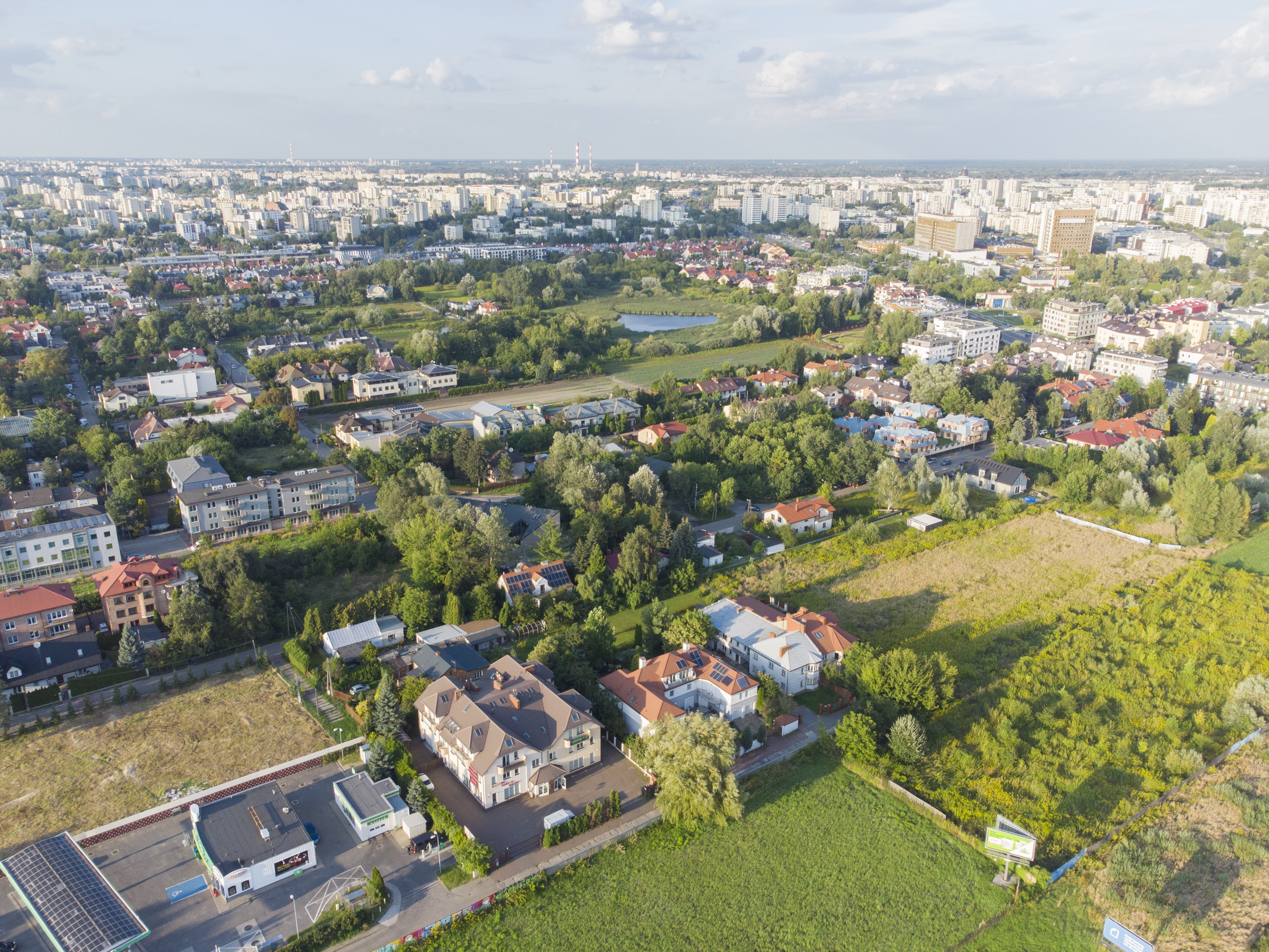
- The houses and apartment buildings at the intersection of Puławska and Płaskowickiej Streets.

- Stary Imielin within the Ursynów district.
- Coordinates: 52°08′57″N 21°01′47″E
- Country: Poland
- Voivodeship: Masovian
- City and county: Warsaw
- District: Ursynów
- Time zone: UTC+1 (CET)
  - Summer (DST): UTC+2 (CEST)
- Area code: +48 22

Stary Imielin (Polish: [ˈsta.rɘ̟ iˈmjɛ.lin]; lit. 'Old Imielin'), also known as West Ursynów (Polish: Ursynów Zachodni [urˈsɨn.uf zaˈxɔd.ɲi]), is a neighbourhood, and a City Information System area, in Warsaw, Poland, within the Ursynów district. It is a residential area with high-rise apartment buildings. It also includes numerous medical facilities, including the Maria Skłodowska-Curie National Research Institute of Oncology, Institute of Haematology and Transfusion Medicine, and the Southern Hospital.

The oldest known records of the village of Imielin come from 1422. It was incorporated into Warsaw in 1951. Between 1976 and 1981, the housing estate was built in the housing estate of West Ursynów. Between 1979 and 1997, the medical complex of the Maria Skłodowska-Curie National Research Institute of Oncology was constructed within the neighbourhood.

== History ==
The oldest known records of Imielin come from 1422, when it was a small village located near the road connecting Warsaw and Piaseczno, now Puławska Street. Throughout history, it was known as Emilin, Imielino, Jamielin, Jemielin, and Jemielino, among other names. In 1445, the village received the Kulm law privileges from the duke Bolesław IV of Warsaw, ruler of the Duchy of Warsaw.

In the 16th century, Imielin was a property of the Służewiecki family. At its largest extent, the farmlands of the Imielin estate measured around 85 hectares. In the 17th century, the village became property of Jakub Hieronim Rozdrażewski, the voivode of the Inowrocław Voivodeship. At the time there were between 8 and 11 households.

In the late 18th century, Imielin, together with nearby Wyczółki, formed the estate owned by Grabowski, the deputy cup-bearer of Warsaw. Together they had 35 households. There were also founded Grabów and Pyry. Additionally in the 19th century, there were also established Grabówek, Krasnowola, and Ludwinów. Following the abolition of serfdom in 1864, in Imielin was incorporated into the municipality of Falenty, and 21 peasant-owned farms were founded in the area. In 1898, the Grabów Emilin narrow-gauge railway station was opened between Grabów and Imielin, at the current intersection of Puławska and Mysikrólika Streets. It was operated by the Grójec Commuter Railway, as part of a line between stations Warszawa Mokotów and Nowe Miasto nad Pilicą. It was closed down in 1957.

In 1905, Imielin had 23 households. In 1921, it was inhabited by 296 people, and in 1923, by 211 people. By 1931, the hamlet of Imielin Nowy was also present to the north, at Puławska Street, near the Służewiec Racecourse.

Imielin was incorporated into the city of Warsaw on 14 May 1951.

Between 1976 and 1981, two housing estates, West Ursynów in the west, and Imielin in the east, were built in the area. They consisted of apartment buildings, mostly built in the large panel system technique. West Ursynów was constructed between Pileckiego Street, Płaskowickiej Street, and Puławska Street. It included multifamily residential apartments, as well as service and manufacturing buildings. It was divided into two parts, separated by a green belt between Imielin Lake and Kabaty Woods. Its eastern section was dedicated to medical infrastructure, while the western section to the industrial and technical buildings. The neighbourhood was designed by a team led by Marek Budzyński. The housing estate of Imielin was built between Ciszewskiego Street, Komisji Edukacji Narodowej Avenue, Płaskowickiej Street, and Pileckiego Street.

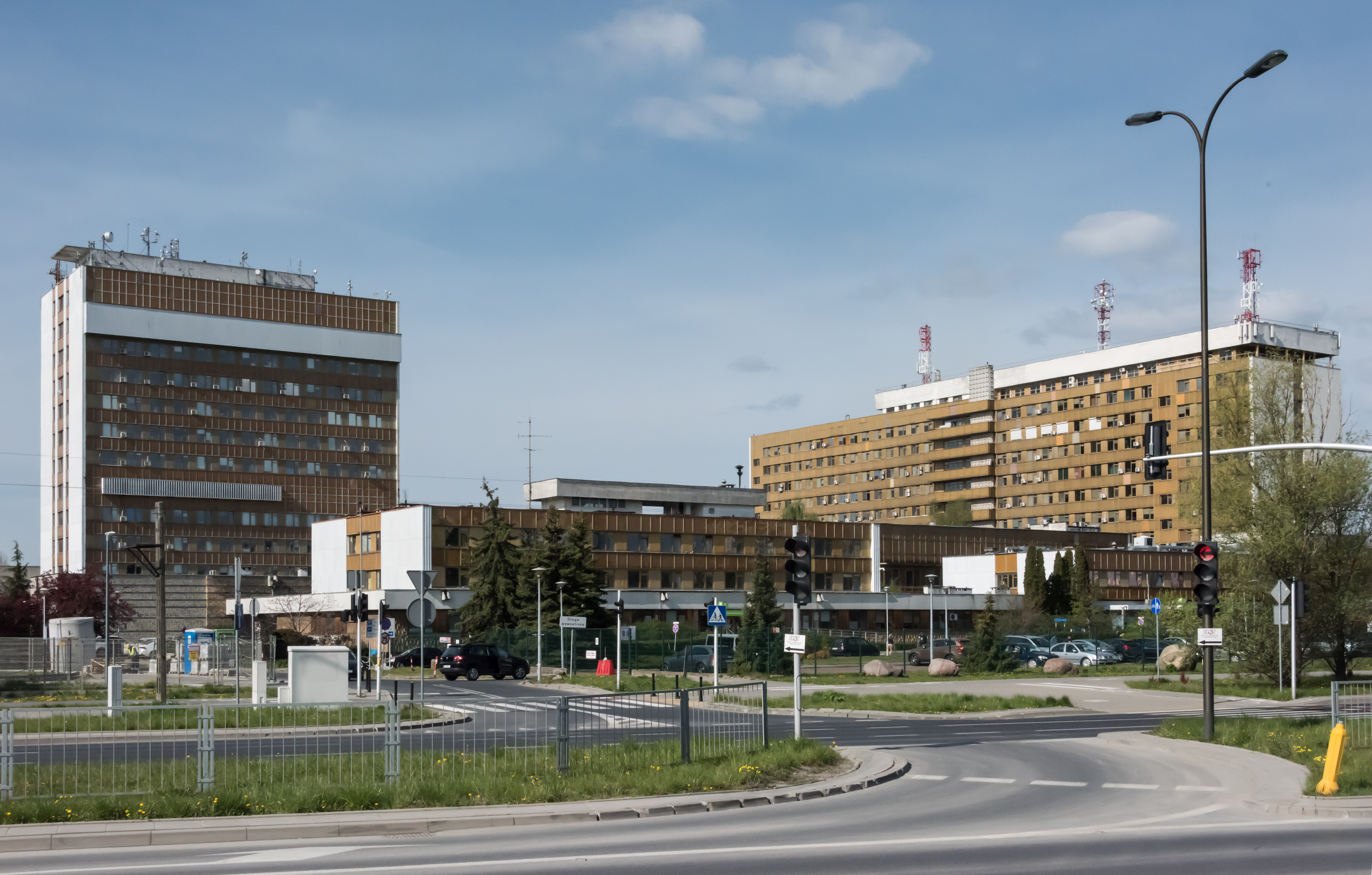
The complex of the Maria Skłodowska-Curie National Research Institute of Oncology, built between 1979 and 1984.

In 1979, the new headquarters and medical complex of the Maria Skłodowska-Curie National Research Institute of Oncology begun being constructed at 5 Roentgena Street. Its first portion was opened in 1984, with expansions being opened in the following years, and with the full completion in 1997.

In 1996, the Saint Christopher Oncological Hospice Foundation, which cares for cancer patients, and helps their families, was founded at 105 Pileckiego Street.

In 1998, the district of Ursynów was subdivided into the areas of the City Information System. Imielin, became one of them, encompassing the housing estates of Imielin, Na Skraju, and West Ursynów. In 2000, it was divided into two areas, separated by Pileckiego Street. Its western portion, which includgled West Ursynów, became Stary Imielin, and the esteren portion, which included Imielin and Na Skraju, became Ursynów-Centrum.

In 2006, the headquarters of the Institute of Haematology and Transfusion Medicine were built at 14 Indiry Gandhi Street. In 2021, the Southern Hospital was opened at 99 Pileckiego Street.

== Characteristics ==
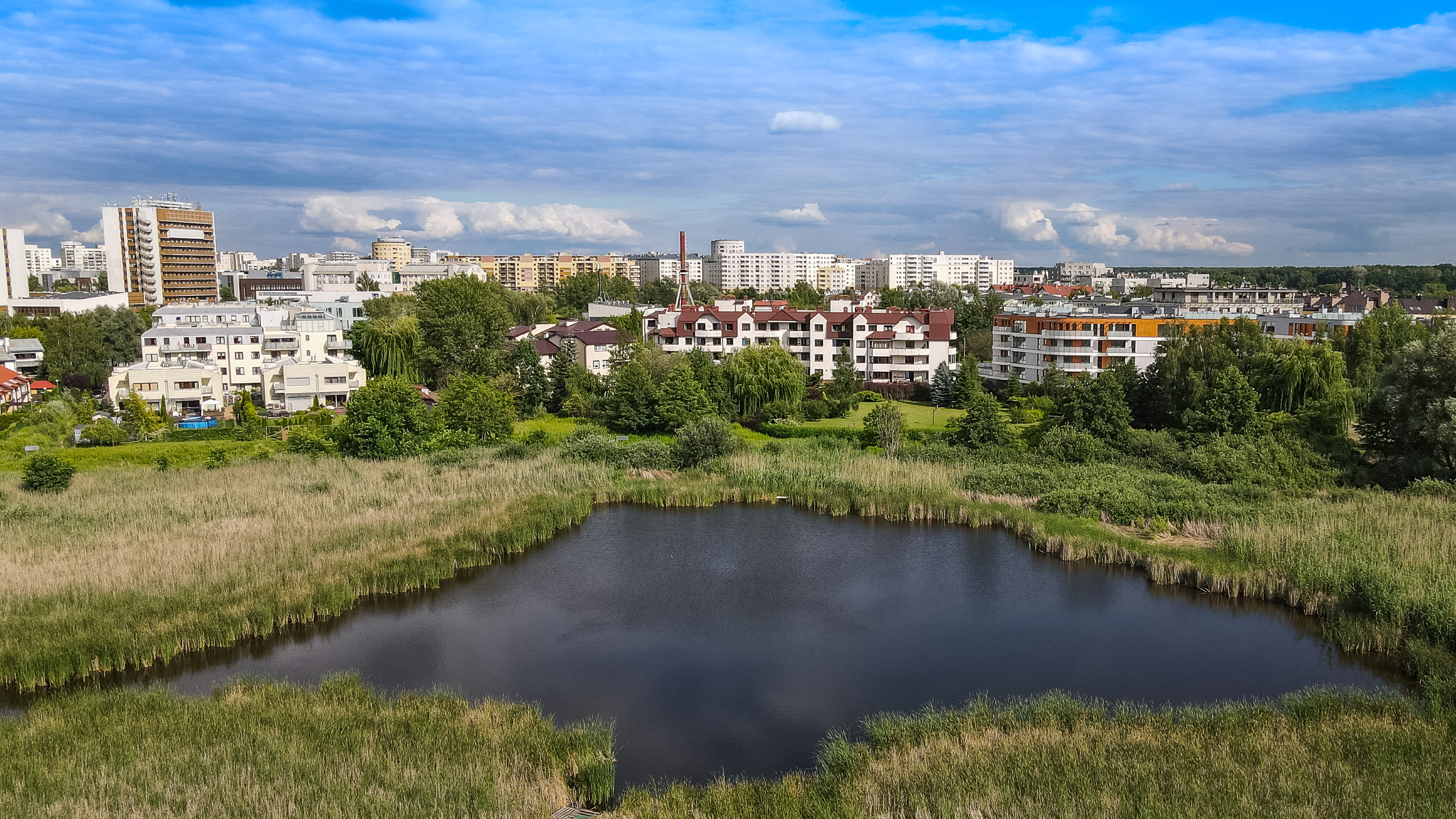
The Imielin Lake.

Stary Imielin encompassed the housing estate of West Ursynów (Polish: Ursynów Zachodni), which predominantly consists of apartment buildings, built in the large panel system technique. Its portion also includes a single-family housing. Additionally, numerous medical facilities are located in the eastern portion of Stary Imielin, including Maria Skłodowska-Curie National Research Institute of Oncology at 5 Roentgena Street, the Institute of Haematology and Transfusion Medicine at 14 Indiry Gandhi Street, and the Southern Hospital at 99 Pileckiego Street. The Saint Christopher Oncological Hospice Foundation, which cares for cancer patients, and helps their families, also operated at 105 Pileckiego Street,

The central portion of the neighbourhood features the Imielin Lake, from which outflows the Imielin Canal. It connects to the Grabów Canal in the northwestern part of Stary Imielin.

Furthermore, the headquarters of the National Clearing House, an institution of the banking sector in Poland, are located at 65 Pileckiego Street within the neighbourhood.

== Location and boundaries ==
Stary Imielin is a City Information System area in Warsaw, located within the central portion of the Ursynów district. To the north and east, its boundary is determined by Pileckiego Street; to the south by Płaskowickiej Street, alongside the former Rolna Street to Żołny Street, and the branch line of the Warsaw Metro; and to the west, by Puławska Street. The neighbourhood borders North Ursynów to the north, Ursynów-Centrum to the east, Natolin, and Pyry to the south, and Grabów to the west.
