= Ursynów-Centrum =

Neighbourhood in Warsaw, Poland

- City Information System area (neighbourhood)
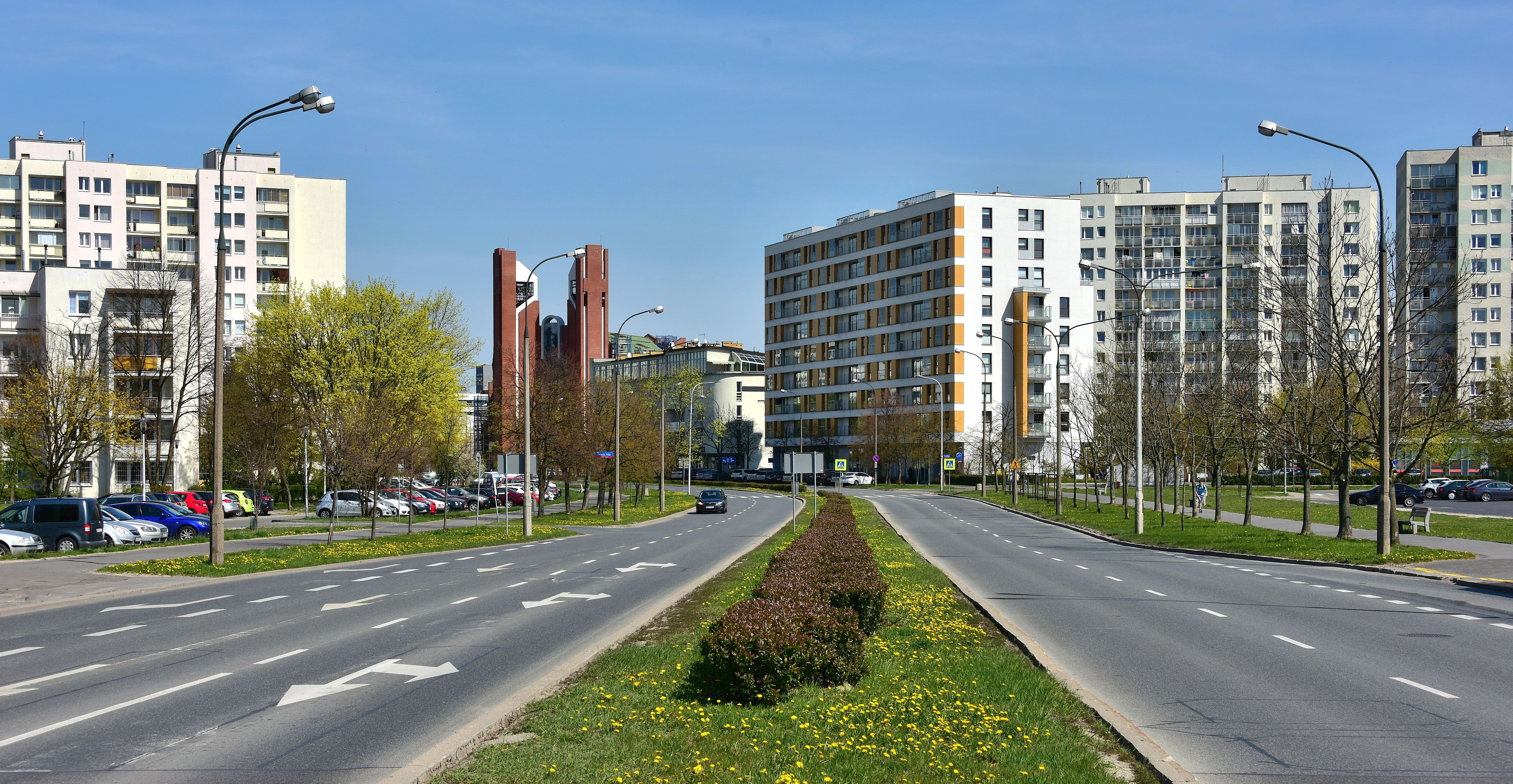
- The apartment buildings at Indiry Gandhi Street.

- Ursynów-Centrum within the Ursynów district.
- Coordinates: 52°09′10″N 21°02′44″E
- Country: Poland
- Voivodeship: Masovian
- City and county: Warsaw
- District: Ursynów
- Time zone: UTC+1 (CET)
  - Summer (DST): UTC+2 (CEST)
- Area code: +48 22

Ursynów-Centrum (Polish: [urˈsɘ̟n.uf ˈt͡sɛn.trum], lit. 'Ursynów-Centre') is a neighbourhood, and a City Information System area, in Warsaw, Poland, within the Ursynów district. It is a residential area, predominantly dominated by apartment buildings, with a presence of low-rise single-family housing in the east.

It consists of two large housing estates, Imielin, and Na Skraju, which together form an area known as South Ursynów (Polish: Ursynów Południowy [urˈsɘ̟n.uf pɔ.wudˈɲɔ.vɘ̟]). Additionally, the neighbourhood of Wolica is located to their east, featuring houses, villas, and apartment buildings. Among notable landmarks, there are Arena Ursynów indoor sports stadium, Multikino Ursynów multiplex, KEN Center shopping mall, and the Thomas the Apostle Church. It also includes the Imielin station of the Warsaw Metro rapid transit system.

The village of Wolica was founded in the area at the turn of the 15th century. They were incorporated into Warsaw in 1951. Between 1976 and 1981, two housing estates of Imielin and Na Skraju were developed in the area. In 1995, it was connected to the Warsaw Metro network.

== History ==
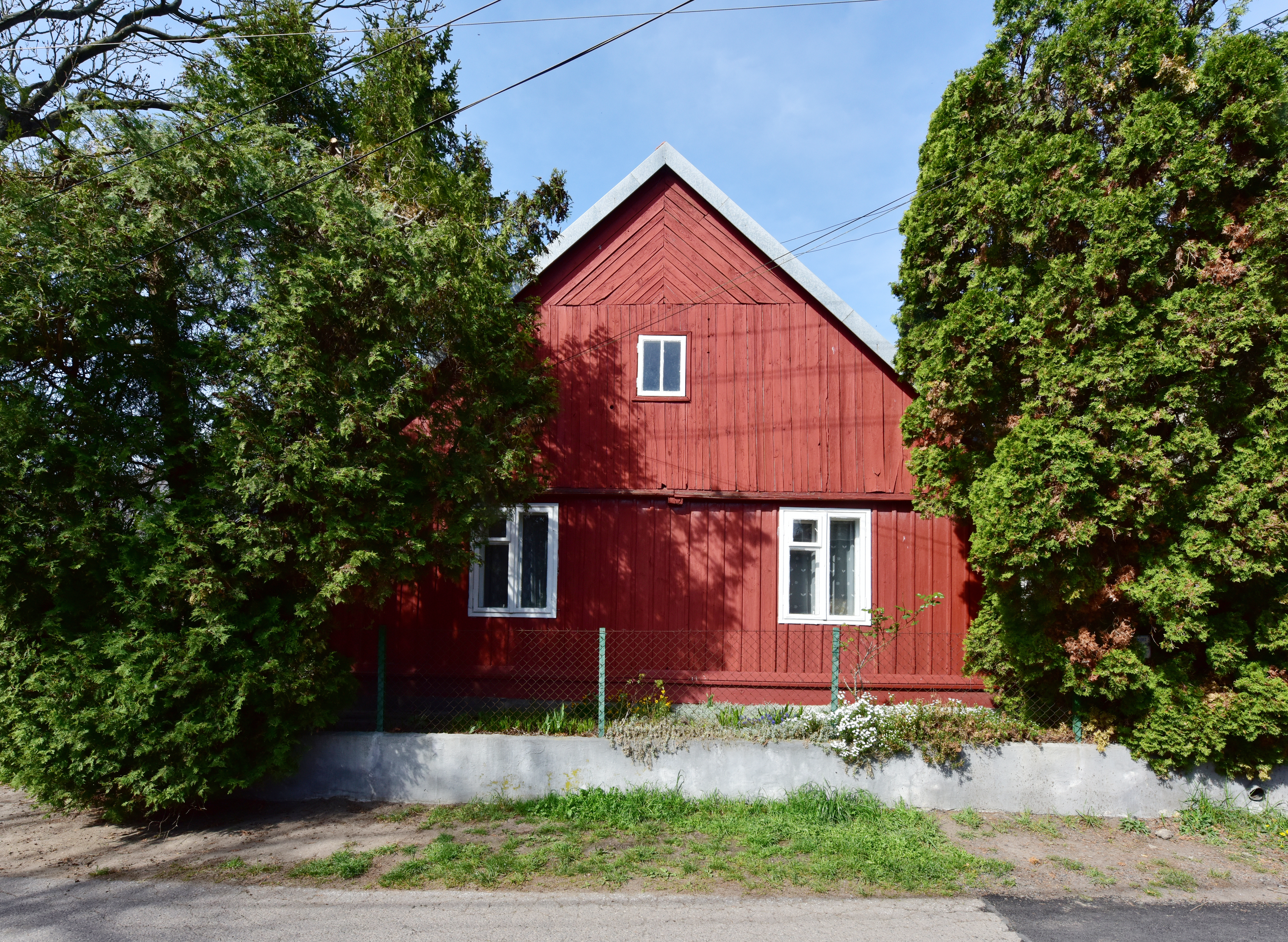
A wooden house at 27 and 29 Kokosowa Street, dating to 1897, making it the oldest structure in Wolica.

The village of Wolica (historically known as Wola Służewska), a small farming community owned by petty nobility, was most likely founded in the area in the second half of the 14th century. In 1730, it was bought by nobleperson and landowner Maria Zofia Czartoryska, and incorporated into the Wilanów Estate. Following the abolition of serfdom in 1864, Wolica became part of the municipality of Wilanów. Additionally, 30 peasant-owned farms were created there. In 1905, Wolica was inhabited by 478 people in 34 houses, all of which were constructed out of wood and with thatched roofs. In 1908, the village was destroyed by fire, with only two houses surviving. Since then, most of the buildings there have been constructed from bricks. In 1921, Wolica was inhabited by 211 people.

During the occupation of Poland in the Second World War, German soldiers were stationed in Wolica. In 1948, a bus line no. 104, connecting Wolica with the Southern Bus Station in Mokotów was opened, operating until 1990. In 1949, the village was connected to the electric network. Wolica was incorporated into the city of Warsaw on 14 May 1951. In 1956, a portion of its farmlands became property of the Warsaw University of Life Sciences, which organised there a test field for its experiments. In the 1950s, Kolejarz Wolica association football club was also founded in the village. In the 1960s, the construction of new housing buildings in the village was forbidden.

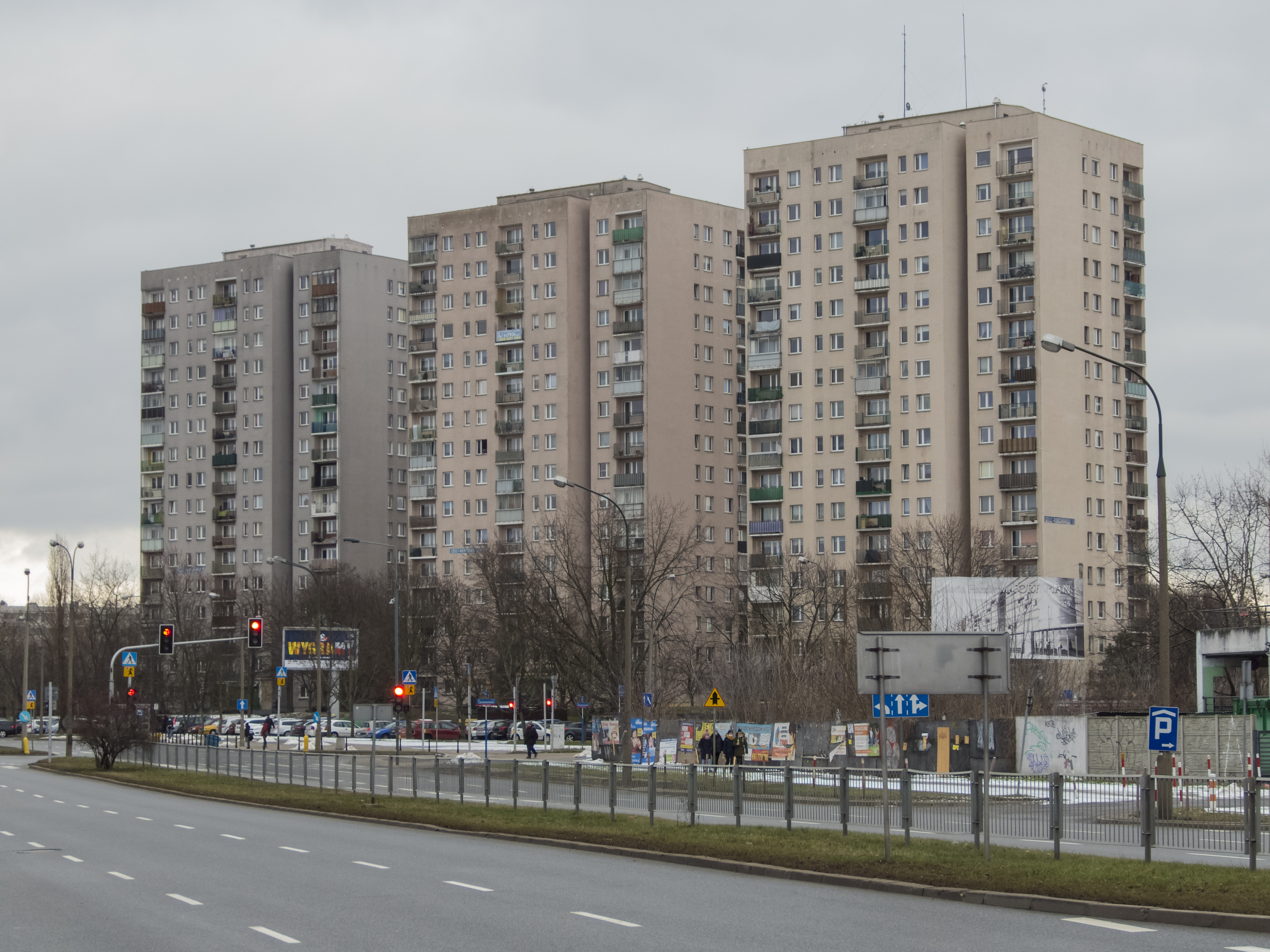
The apartment buildings at Szolc-Rogozińskiego Street, built in the 1970s.

Between 1976 and 1981, the urbanist planning area of South Ursynów was developed, consisting of two housing estates, Imielin in the west, and Na Skraju in the east, with a total area of 213.5 ha. The neighbourhoods were separated by Komisji Edukacji Narodowej Avenue and encompassed within an area between Ciszewskiego, Kiedacza, Nugat, Rosoła, Płaskowickiej Street, and Pileckiego Street. They consisted of mid- and high-rise apartment buildings, ranging in height from 4 to 16 storeys. The area was designed to house around 35,700 people in around 10,200 apartments. A portion of Na Skraju was constructed on the farmlands of Wolica, seized by the government from the local owners, with a small financial compensation. In the early 1970s, it was 3 zloties per one square metre. The housing estates were designed by A. Fabierkiewicz, P. Jankowski, E. Sander-Krysiak, and S. Stefanowicz, and developed by the Capital City Association of Housing Construction (Polish: Stołeczny Związek Budownictwa Mieszkaniowego). In the 1990s, new villas and apartment buildings began also being developed in Wolica. Currently, the neighbourhood still includes a few historic houses, with the oldest of them being located at 27 and 29 Kokosowa Street, and dating to 1897.

In 1994, a private university, known as the Warsaw School of Advertising, was also founded at 3 Szolc-Rogozińskiego Street, becoming the leading school in its field in Poland. In 1995, the Imielin station of the M1 line of the Warsaw Metro rapid transit underground system was opened at the intersection of Komisji Edukacji Narodowej Avenue and Indiry Gandhi Street. Between 1995 and 2001, the Thomas the Apostle Church, a Catholic temple, was built at 12 Dereniowa Street. In 2001, the Blessed Edmund Bojanowski Church, which belongs to the Catholic, began being constructed at 12 Kokosowa Street. Its location in the past featured the Wolica Cemetery, though when it was built and demolished remains unknown.

In 1998, the Ursynów district was subdivided into the areas of the City Information System. Imielin became one of them, encompassing the housing estates of Imielin, Na Skraju, and West Ursynów. In 2000, it was divided into two areas, separated by Pileckiego Street. Its western portion, which includes West Ursynów, became Stary Imielin, and the eastern portion, including Imielin and Na Skraju, became Ursynów-Centrum.

In 1999, the Multikino Ursynów multiplex was opened at 60 Komisji Edukacji Narodowej Avenue. It was the second multiplex in Poland, and the first in Warsaw, as well as the largest cinema in the city at the time.

In 2007, Arena Ursynów indoor sports stadium was opened at 122 Pileckiego Street. In 2008, the Ursynów Town Hall was built 61 Komisji Edukacji Narodowej Avenue, as the seat of the district government. In 2009, the KEN Center shopping mall was opened at 15 Ciszewskiego Street. In 2021, the Polish Inventors Park, a recreational green area, begun being develop at the intersection of Rosoła and Indiry Gandhi Streets.

== Characteristics ==
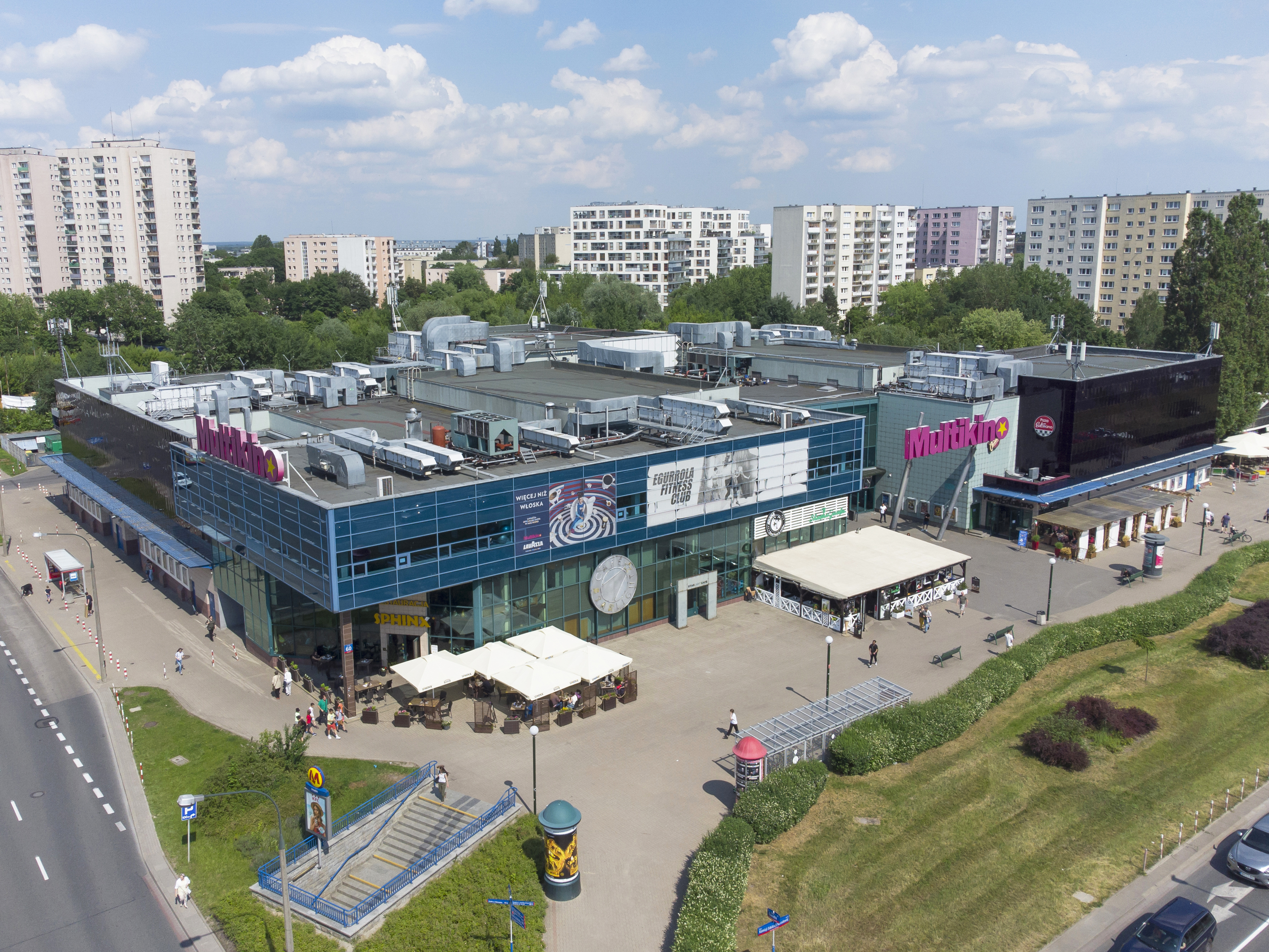
Multikino Ursynów, one of the largest multiplexes in Poland.

Ursynów-Centrum is a residential area, predominantly formed from two housing estates, Imielin in the west, and Na Skraju in the east, which together form the urban area of South Ursynów (Polish: Ursynów Południowy). They are separated by Komisji Edukacji Narodowej Avenue and encompassed between Ciszewskiego, Kiedacza, Nugat, Rosoła, Płaskowickiej Street, and Pileckiego Street. They consisted of mid- and high-rise apartment buildings, ranging in height from 4 to 16 storeys. Additionally, the neighbourhood of Wolica is located to the east, featuring detached houses, villas, and apartment buildings. It also includes a few historic houses, with the oldest of them being located at 27 and 29 Kokosowa Street, and dating to 1897.

The area has the Imielin station of the M1 line of the Warsaw Metro rapid transit underground system, located at the intersection of Komisji Edukacji Narodowej Avenue and Indiry Gandhi Street. It also includes the Arena Ursynów indoor sports stadium at 122 Pileckiego Street, the Multikino Ursynów multiplex at 60 Komisji Edukacji Narodowej Avenue, KEN Center shopping mall at 15 Ciszewskiego Street, and the Warsaw School of Advertising at 3 Szolc-Rogozińskiego Street, considered Poland's leading leading school of advertising. Additionally, the Ursynów Town Hall, located at 61 Komisji Edukacji Narodowej Avenue, houses the seat of the district government. The neighbourhood also has two Catholic temples, the Thomas the Apostle Church at 12 Dereniowa Street, and the Blessed Edmund Bojanowski Church, located at 12 Kokosowa Street, at the boundary between Ursynów-Centrum and Błonia Wilanowskie, which is currently under construction. Additionally, a recreational green area, known as the Polish Inventors Park, is currently being developed at the intersection of Rosoła Street and Indiry Gandhi Street.

== Location and boundaries ==
Ursynów-Centrum is a City Information System area in Warsaw, located within the northeastern portion of the Ursynów district. To the north, its boundary is determined by Ciszewskiego Street; to the east, by Warsaw Escarpment; to the south by Płaskowickiej Street, and Branickiego Street; and to the west, by Pileckiego Street. The neighbourhood borders North Ursynów, and Stary Służew to the north, Wilanów Fields to the east, Natolin to the south, and Stary Imielin to the west. Its eastern boundary forms the border of districts of Ursynów and Wilanów.
