= Curie Institute =

Curie Institute may refer to:

- Curie Institute (Paris), France
- Maria Skłodowska-Curie National Research Institute of Oncology, Warsaw, Poland
