= Imielin (housing estate) =

Neighbourhood in Warsaw, Poland

- Neighbourhood
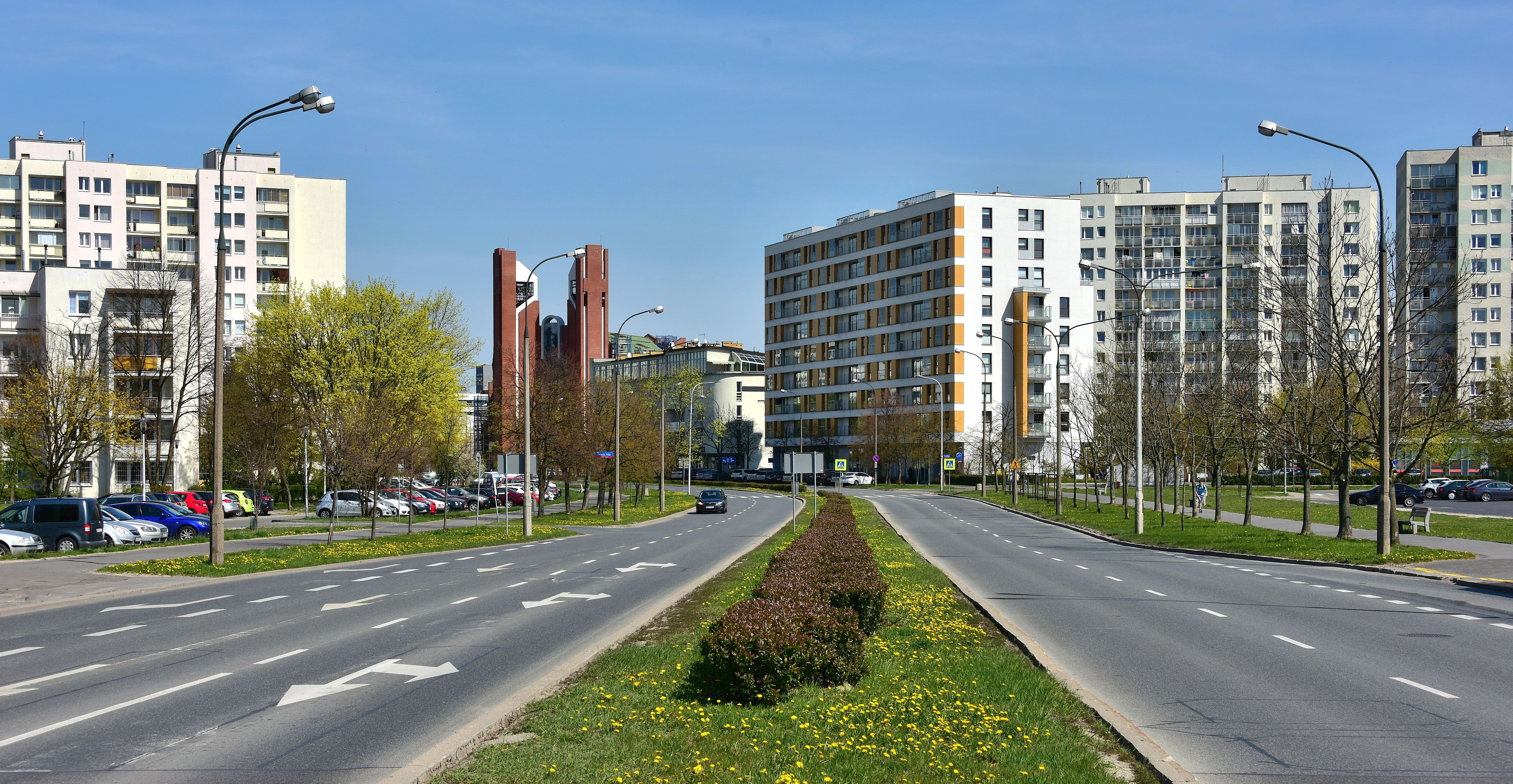
- The apartment buildings at Indiry Gandhi Street.
- Interactive map of Imielin
- Coordinates: 52.147793°N 21.042284°E
- Country: Poland
- Voivodeship: Masovian
- City and county: Warsaw
- District: Ursynów
- City Information System area: Ursynów-Centrum
- Establishment: 1981
- Time zone: UTC+1 (CET)
  - Summer (DST): UTC+2 (CEST)
- Area code: +48 22

Imielin (Polish: [iˈmjɛ.lin]) is a housing estate in Warsaw, Poland, within the Ursynów district, forming part of the City Information System area of Ursynów-Centrum. Its a high-rise multifamily residential area. The neighbourhood includes the Imielin station of the Warsaw Metro rapit transit system. It was developed between 1976 and 1981.

== History ==
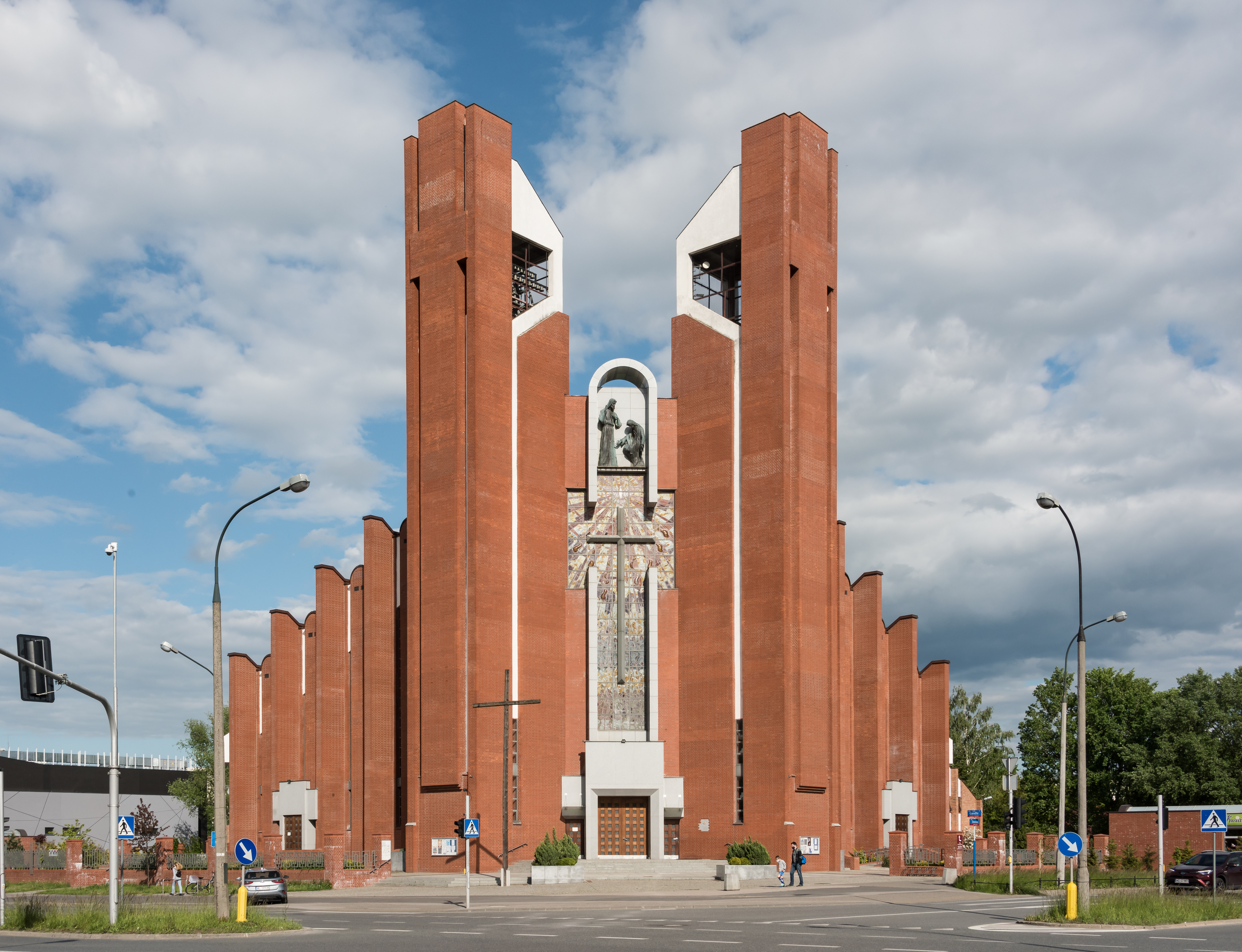
The Thomas the Apostle Church, built between 1995 and 2001.

The area was incorporated into the city of Warsaw on 14 May 1951. Between 1976 and 1981, the housing estate of Imielin was developed between Ciszewskiego Street,Komisji Edukacji Narodowej Avenue, Płaskowickiej Street, and Pileckiego Street. It consisted of mid- and high-rise apartment buildings, ranging from 4 to 16 storeys. The neighbourhood was designed by A. Fabierkiewicz, P. Jankowski, E. Sander-Krysiak, and S. Stefanowicz, and developed by the Capital City Association of Housing Construction (Polish: Stołeczny Związek Budownictwa Mieszkaniowego). It was named after the historic neighbourhood of Imielin, located to the east, and dating to at least 15th century.

In 1995, the Imielin station of the M1 line of the Warsaw Metro rapid transit underground syststem, was opened at the intersection of Komisji Edukacji Narodowej Avenue and Indiry Gandhi Street.

Between 1995 and 2001, the Thomas the Apostle Church, which belongs to the Catholic denomination, was constructed at 12 Dereniowa Street.

In 2007, the Arena Ursynów indoor sports stadium was opened at 122 Pileckiego Street. In 2008, Ursynów Town Hall, the seat of district government, was opened at 61 Komisji Edukacji Narodowej Avenue.

== Characteristics ==
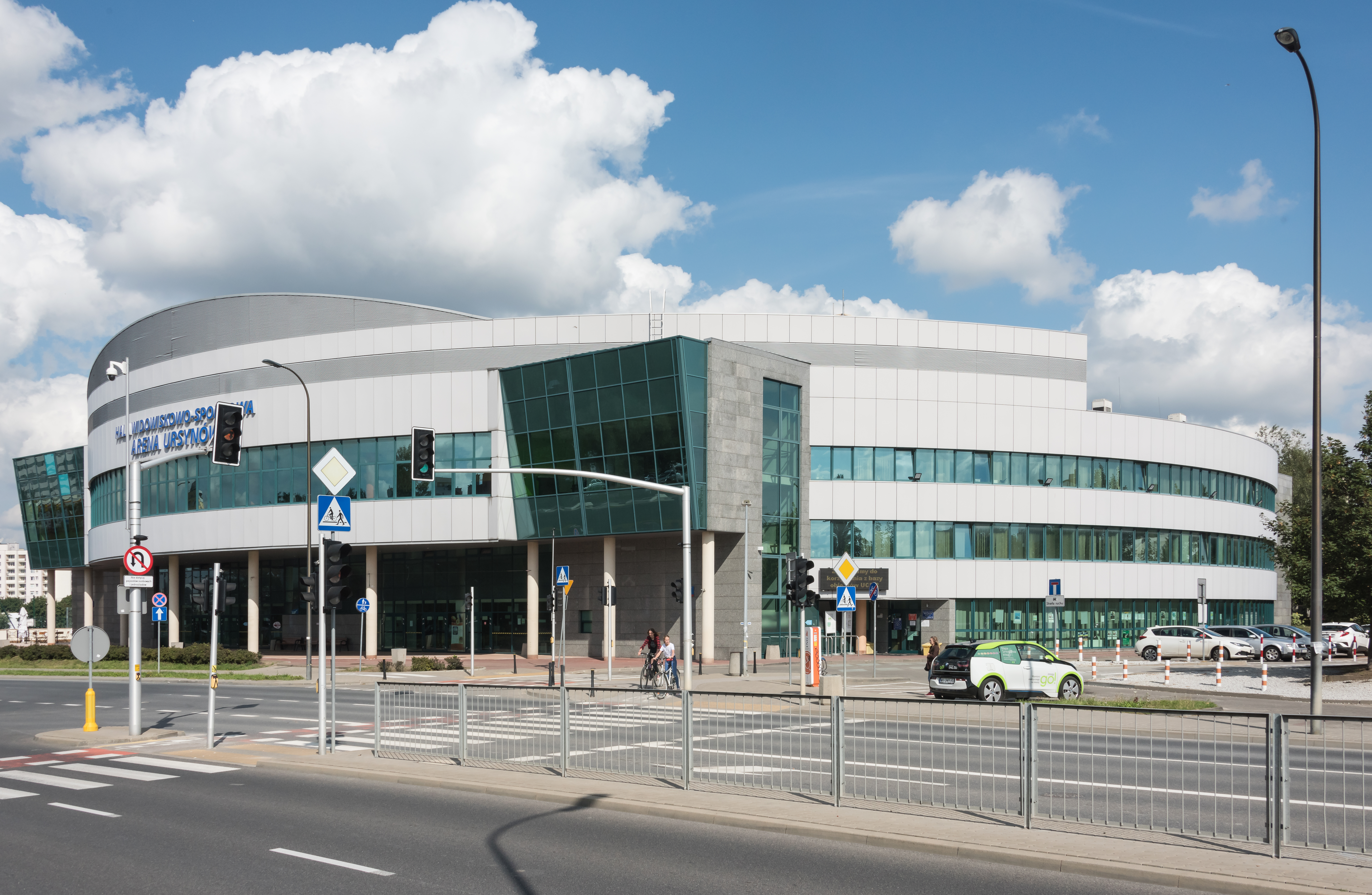
The Arena Ursynów indoor sports stadium.

Imielin is a housing estate located between Ciszewskiego Street, Komisji Edukacji Narodowej Avenue, Płaskowickiej Street, and Pileckiego Street. It consists of high-rise apartment buildings. It includes the Imielin station of the M1 line of the Warsaw Metro rapid transit underground system, located at the intersection of Komisji Edukacji Narodowej Avenue and Indiry Gandhi Street. Additionally, the neighbourhood features the Thomas the Apostle Church at 12 Dereniowa Street, whuch belongs to the Catholic denomination, and the Arena Ursynów indoor sports stadium at opened at 122 Pileckiego Street. Additionally, the Ursynów Town Hall, located at 61 Komisji Edukacji Narodowej Avenue, houses the seat of the district government.
