= Na Skraju =

Neighbourhood of Warsaw, Poland

- Neighbourhood
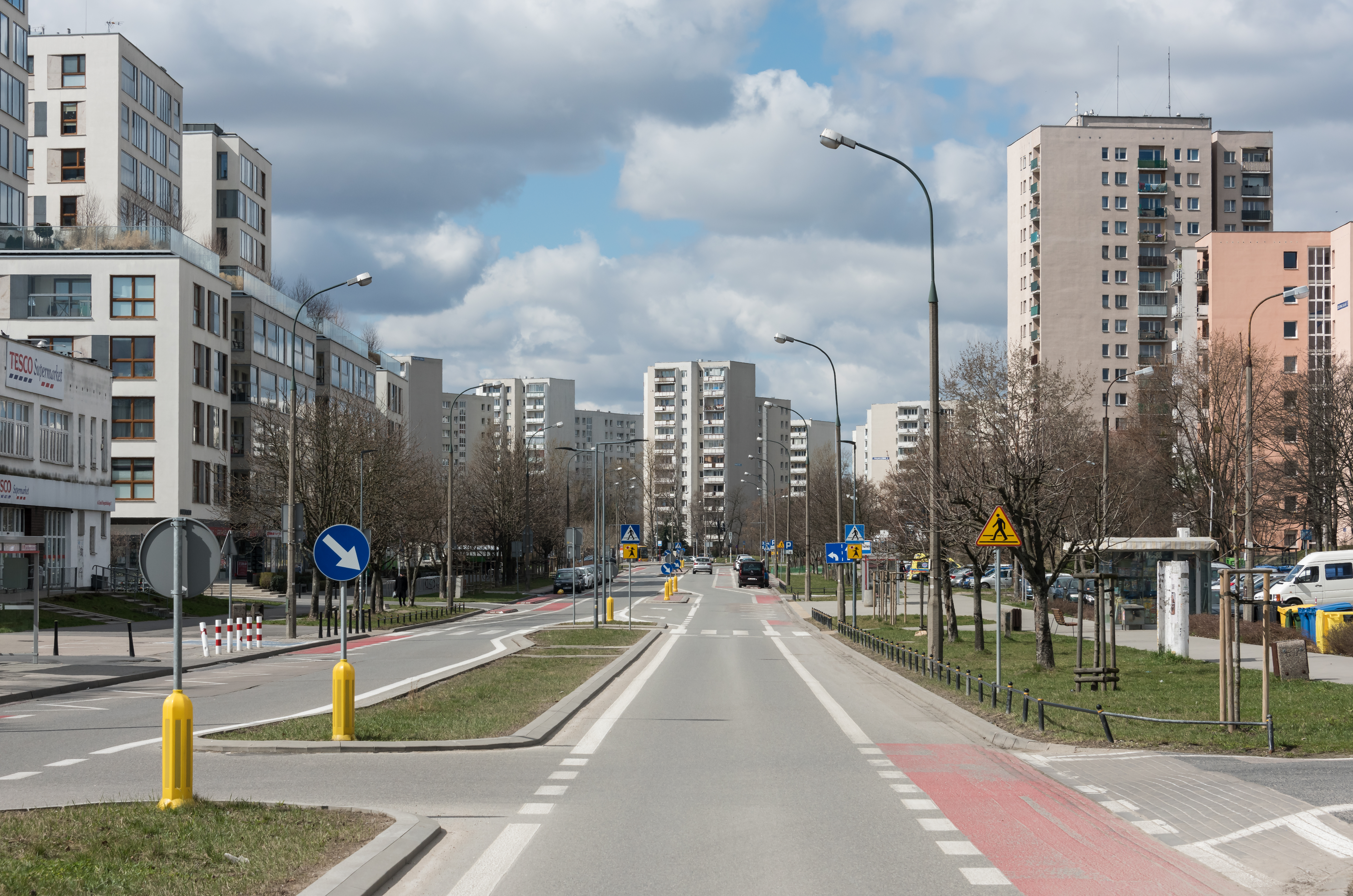
- The apartment buildings at Cynamonowa Street.
- Interactive map of Na Skraju
- Coordinates: 52°09′17″N 21°02′53″E
- Country: Poland
- Voivodeship: Masovian
- City and county: Warsaw
- District: Ursynów
- City Information System area: Ursynów-Centrum
- Time zone: UTC+1 (CET)
  - Summer (DST): UTC+2 (CEST)
- Area code: +48 22

Na Skraju (Polish: [na‿ˈskra.ju]; lit. 'On the Edge') is a housing estate in Warsaw, Poland, within the Ursynów district, in the eastern portion of the City Information System area of Ursynów-Centrum. It consists of high-rise apartment buildings and also includes the Imielin station of the M1 line of the Warsaw Metro rapid transit underground system. It was developed between 1976 and 1981.

== Toponomy ==
The name Na Skraju means "on the edge" in Polish, and refers to the fact that the neighbourhood was developed relatively close to the slope of the Warsaw Escarpment.

== History ==
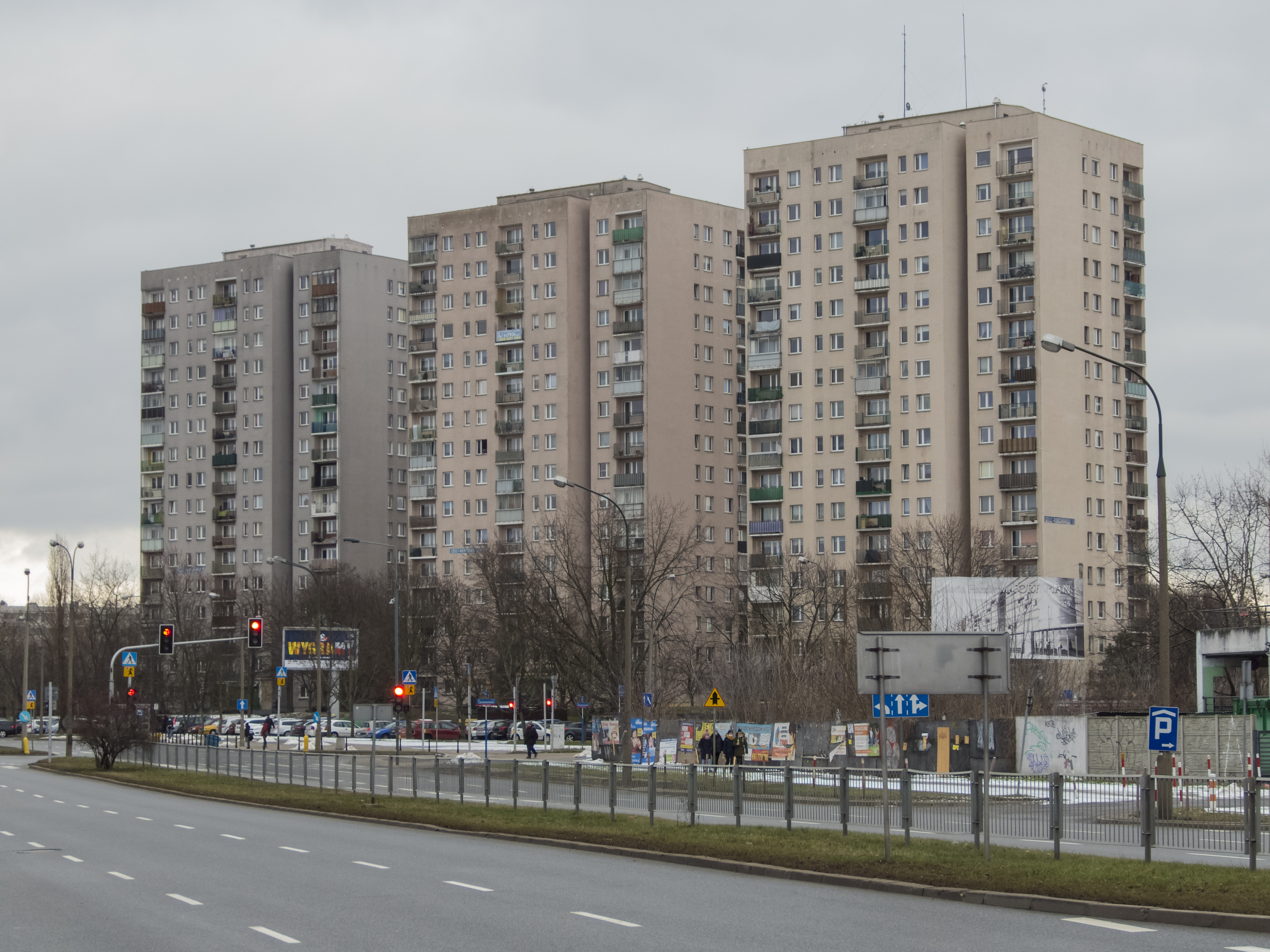
The apartment buildings at Szolc-Rogozińskiego Street, built in the 1970s.

The area was incorporated into the city of Warsaw on 14 May 1951. Between 1976 and 1981, the housing estate of Na Skraju was developed between Ciszewskiego Street, Kiedacza Street, Nugat Street, Rosoła Street, Płaskowickiej Street, and Komisji Edukacji Narodowej Avenue. A portion of the neighbourhood was built on the farmlands of Wolica, seized by the government from the local owners, with a small financial compensation. In the early 1970s, it was 3 zloties per one square metre. Na Skraju consisted of mid- and high-rise apartment buildings, ranging from 4 to 16 storeys. The neighbourhood was designed by A. Fabierkiewicz, P. Jankowski, E. Sander-Krysiak, and S. Stefanowicz, and developed by the Capital City Association of Housing Construction (Polish: Stołeczny Związek Budownictwa Mieszkaniowego).

In 1994, a private university, known as the Warsaw School of Advertising, was also founded at Rogozińskiego Street, becoming the leading school in its field in Poland. In 1995, the Imielin station of the M1 line of the Warsaw Metro rapid transit underground system was opened at the intersection of Komisji Edukacji Narodowej Avenue and Indiry Gandhi Street.

In 1999, the Multikino Ursynów multiplex was opened at 60 Komisji Edukacji Narodowej Avenue. It was the second multiplex in Poland, and the first in Warsaw, as well as the largest cinema in the city at the time. In 2009, the KEN Center shopping mall was opened at 15 Ciszewskiego Street. In 2021, the Polish Inventors Park, a recreational green area, begun being develop at the intersection of Rosoła and Indiry Gandhi Streets.

== Characteristics ==
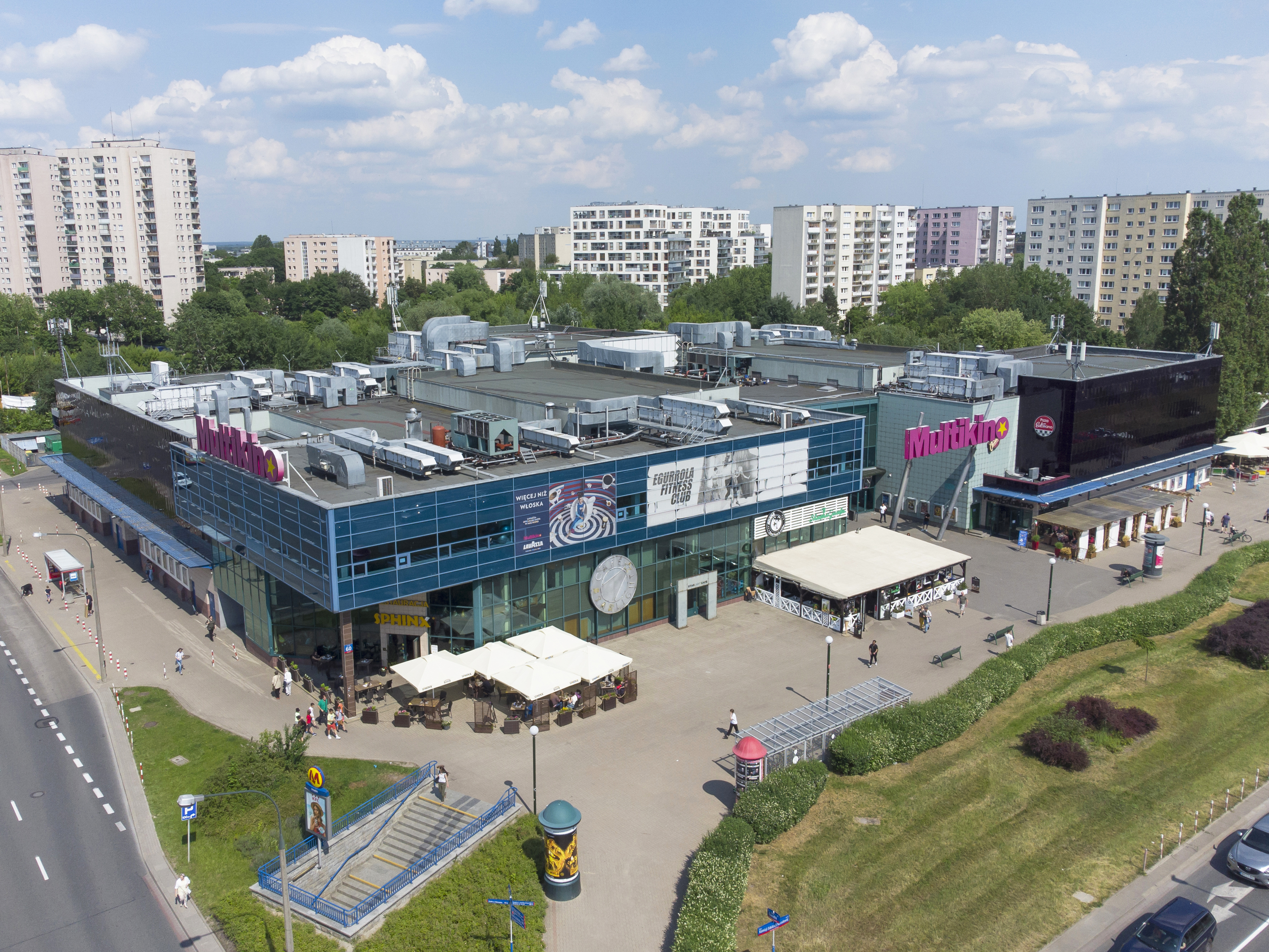
Multikino Ursynów, one of the largest multiplexes in Poland.

The housing estate of Na Skraju is placed between Ciszewskiego Street, Kiedacza Street, Nugat Street, Rosoła Street, Płaskowickiej Street, and Komisji Edukacji Narodowej Avenue. It consists of mid- and high-rise apartment buildings, ranging in height from 4 to 16 storeys. It has the Imielin station of the M1 line of the Warsaw Metro rapid transit underground system, located at the intersection of Komisji Edukacji Narodowej Avenue and Indiry Gandhi Street. The neighbourhood also includes the Multikino Ursynów multiplex at 60 Komisji Edukacji Narodowej Avenue, the KEN Center shopping mall at 15 Ciszewskiego Street, and the Warsaw School of Advertising at 3 Szolc-Rogozińskiego Street, considered Poland's leading leading school of advertising. Moreover, a recreational green area, known as the Polish Inventors Park, is currently being developed at the intersection of Rosoła Street and Indiry Gandhi Street.
