= Wolica, Warsaw =

Neighbourhood in Warsaw, Poland

Wolica
- Neighbourhood
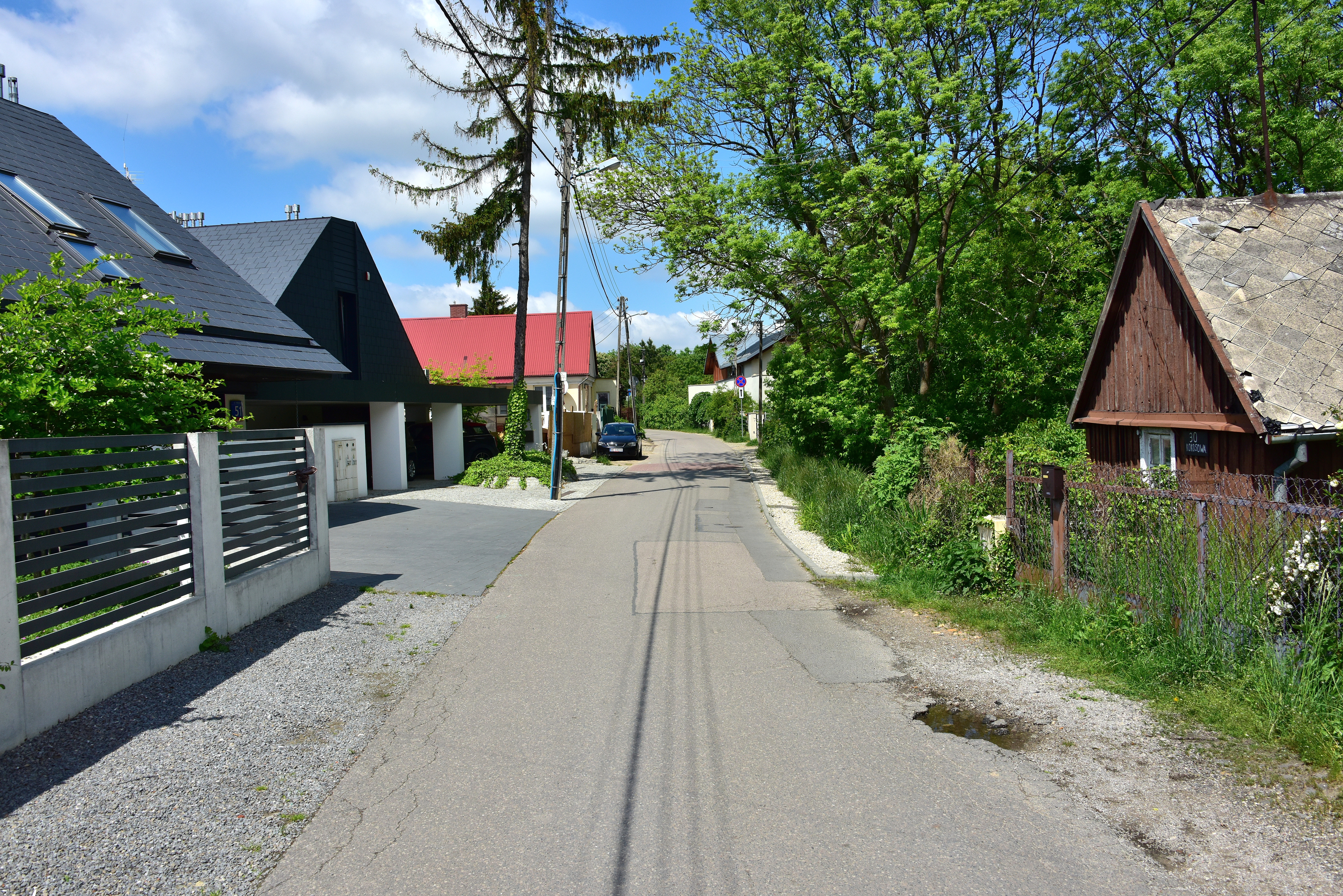
- Houses in Wolica at Kokosowa Street.
- Interactive map of Wolica
- Coordinates: 52.154281°N 21.058893°E
- Country: Poland
- Voivodeship: Masovian
- City and county: Warsaw
- Districts: Ursynów; Wilanów
- City Information System areas: Błonia Wilanowskie; Ursynów-Centrum
- Time zone: UTC+1 (CET)
  - Summer (DST): UTC+2 (CEST)
- Area code: +48 22

Wolica (Polish: [vɔˈli.t͡sa]) is a neighbourhood in the city of Warsaw. It is located at the boundary between the districts of Ursynów and Wilanów, and is divided between City Information System areas of Błonia Wilanowskie and Ursynów-Centrum. It features houses, villas, and apartment buildings. Wolica was most likely founded in the 14th century, and its oldest known records date to 1424. Throughout most of its history, it was a small farming community. In 1951, it was incorporated into Warsaw.

== History ==
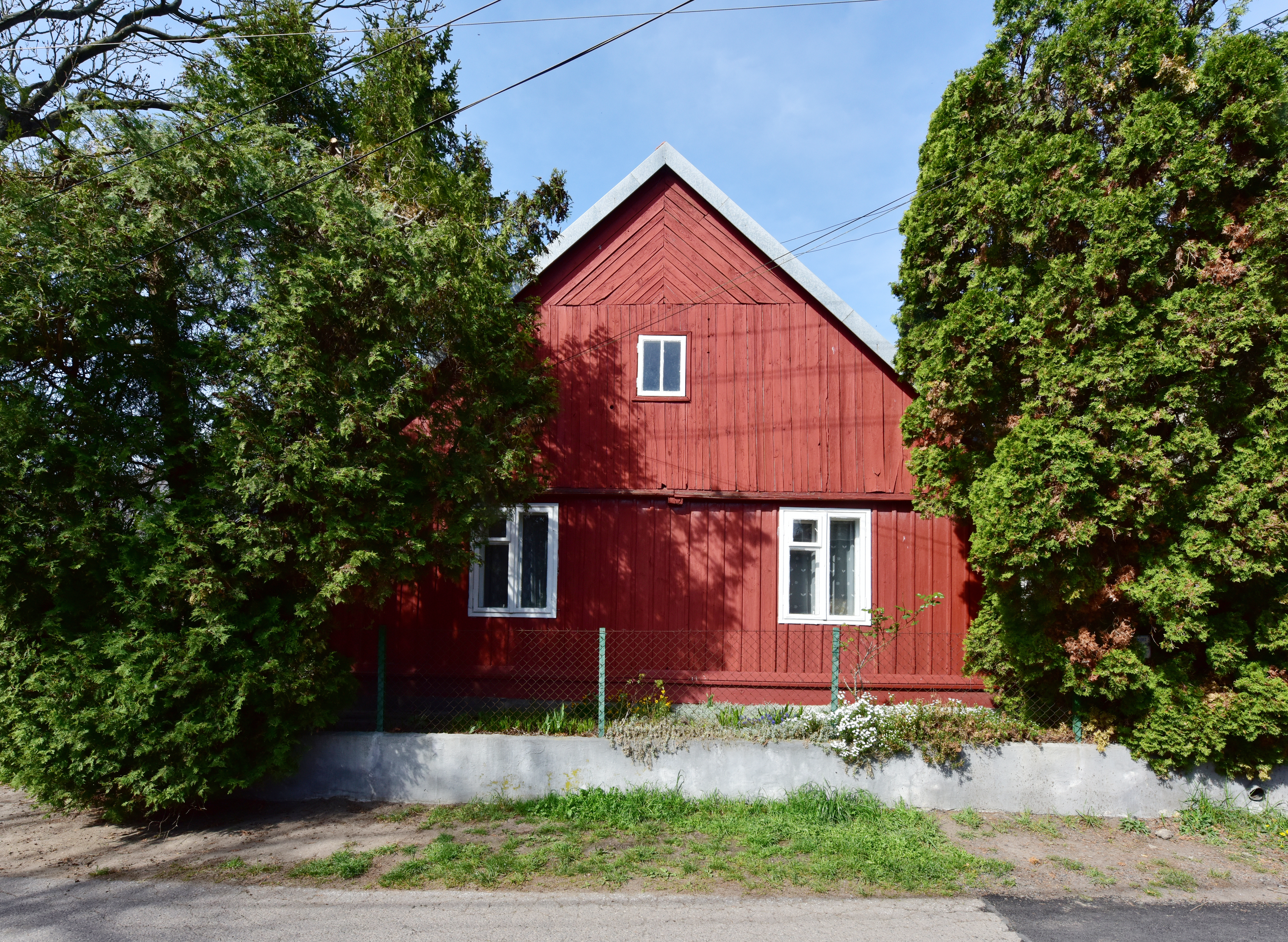
A wooden house at 27 and 29 Kokosowa Street, dating to 1897, making it the oldest structure in Wolica.

Wolica, historically known as Wola Służewska (Polish pronunciation: [ˈvɔ.la swuˈʐɛf.ska]) was most likely founded in the second half of the 14th century. The first known records of it come from 1424. The names Wolica and Wola are related to Polish term wolność ("freedom"). Historically, since 13th century, name Wola was given to the villages whose population had certain freedoms, such as being exempt from paying taxes. This suggests that Wolica was founded as one of such settlements, attracting settlers with a temporary exemption of taxation. The village was part of the Catholic parish of the St. Catherine Church. Wolica was located at the road between Warsaw and Czersk, which currently forms part of Nowoursynowska Street. In 1528, together with its farmlands, it had a total area of around 85 ha, and was owned by the Wierzbów family.

In 1730, the village was bought by a nobleperson and landowner Maria Zofia Czartoryska, and incorporated into the Wilanów Estate. In 1775, Wolica had 15 houses, and in 1827, it had 177 inhabitants in 13 households. Following the abolition of serfdom in 1864, the village was incorporated into the municipality of Wilanów. Additionally, 30 peasant-owned farms were founded there, collectively having an area of 178 ha.

In 1905, Wolica was inhabited by 478 people in 34 houses, all of which were constructed out of wood and with thatched roofs. In 1908, the village burned down, with only two houses surviving. Buildings constructed after the fire were primarily made from brick. In 1912, it had 471 residents, and it included 360 ha of farmland, half of which was owned by local families, and the rest by the noble family of Branicki. Vegetables such as onion and radish were grown there. In 1921, the village was inhabited by 336 people in 40 houses.

During the occupation of Poland in the Second World War, German soldiers were stationed in Wolica.

In 1948, a bus line no. 104, connecting Wolica with the Southern Bus Station in Mokotów was opened. It ended with a turning loop at Nowoursynowska Street. In 1949, the village was connected to the electric network. Wolica was incorporated into the city of Warsaw on 14 May 1951. In 1956, a portion of its farmlands became property of the Warsaw University of Life Sciences, which organised there a test field for its experiments. In the 1950s, Kolejarz Wolica association football club was also founded in the village. In the 1960s, the construction of new housing buildings in the village was forbidden.

In the 1960s, the construction of new housing buildings in Wolica was forbidden. A portion of its farmlands were seized by the government from the local owners, for the construction of the housing estate of Na Skraju, between 1976 and 1981. The owners received a small financial compensation. In the early 1970s, it was 3 zloties per one square metre. In 1990, the bus line no. 104 was rerouted away from Wolica, via Rosoła Street to Kabaty, end eventually discontinued in 1993. Since the 1990s, new villas and terraced multi-family houses have been built among the old residential and farm buildings of Wolica.

In 2001, the Blessed Edmund Bojanowski Church, which belongs to the Catholic, began being constructed at 12 Kokosowa Street. Its location in the past featured the Wolica Cemetery, though when it was built and demolished remains unknown.

Currently, the neighbourhood still includes a few historic houses. The oldest of them, located at 27 and 29 Kokosowa Street, dates to 1897, and is listed on the municipal heritage list.

== Characteristics ==
Wolica is a small residential neighbourhood featuring houses, villas, and apartment buildings. The neighbourhood is placed between Ciszewskiego Street, Warsaw Escarpment, Branickiego Street, Jana Rosoła Street, Rosoła Street, Nugat Street, and Kiedacza Street. It is located at the boundary between the districts of Ursynów and Wilanów, and is divided between City Information System areas of Błonia Wilanowskie and Ursynów-Centrum. The Blessed Edmund Bojanowski Church, which belongs to the Catholic denomination, is currently being constructed at 12 Kokosowa Street.
