= Maria Skłodowska-Curie National Research Institute of Oncology =

Maria Sklodowska-Curie National Research Institute of Oncology
- Polish Ministry of Health
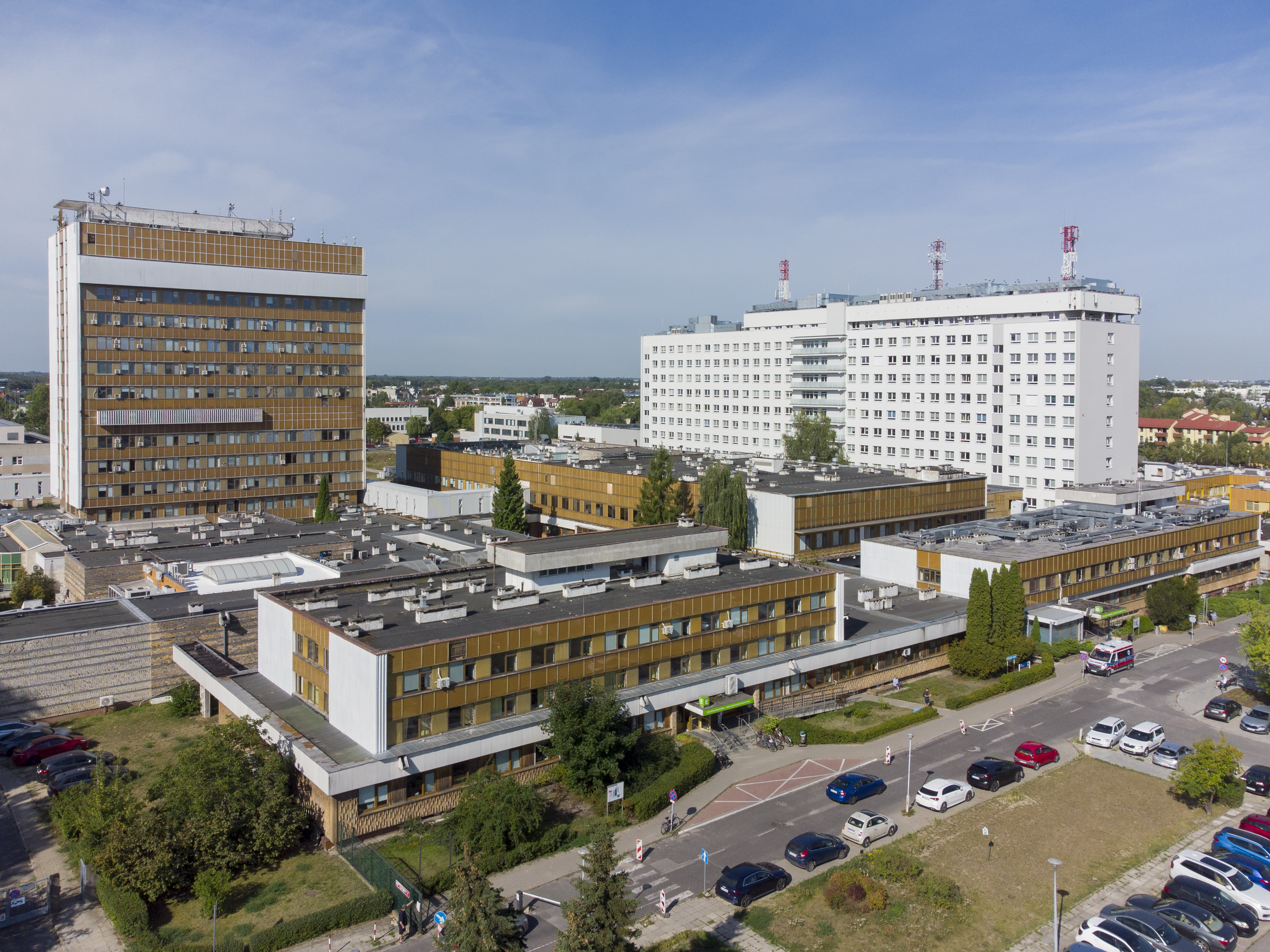
- Maria Skłodowska-Curie Institute

- Maria Skłodowska-Curie Institute in Warsaw Maria Skłodowska-Curie National Research Institute of Oncology (Poland)

Geography
- Location: Warsaw, Masovian Voivodeship, Poland
- Coordinates: 52°08′51″N 21°01′57″E

Organisation
- Type: Specialist

Services
- Beds: 741
- Speciality: Oncology

History
- Founded: 29 May 1932

Links
- Website: www.pib-nio.pl

The Maria Sklodowska-Curie National Research Institute of Oncology (Polish: Narodowy Instytut Onkologii im. Marii Skłodowskiej-Curie – Państwowy Instytut Badawczy, until 2020 Maria Skłodowska-Curie Institute of Oncology, Polish: Centrum Onkologii–Instytut im. Marii Skłodowskiej-Curie) is a specialized research institute and hospital of the Polish Ministry of Health. Based in Warsaw, it also has regional branches in Gliwice and Kraków. It was founded in 1932 as the Radium Institute by double-Nobel laureate Maria Skłodowska-Curie in collaboration with the Polish Government, especially President Ignacy Mościcki.

== History ==
The institute was created in 1925 following the success of the first Radium Institute, which had been set up in 1918 by Maria Skłodowska-Curie at the University of Paris. While Maria toured the United States to raise funds, receiving the gift of a gram of radium from US President Herbert Hoover that had been bought with funds raised by American women, her sister Bronisława Dłuska supervised fundraising in Poland and oversaw the construction and recruitment, organising a campaign that sold symbolic bricks featuring Maria's image. It was officially opened on 29 May 1932, with Bronisława continuing as the director. One of the institute's brick walls bears the inscription, "MARII SKŁODOWSKIEJ CURIE, W HOŁDZIE"—"In homage to Maria Skłodowska Curie."

In August 1944, during the Ochota massacre that followed the Warsaw Uprising, the patients and the staff were brutally murdered by the members of S.S. Sturmbrigade R.O.N.A. anti-partisan formation, and the building looted and set on fire.

After World War II, the Institute re-opened and changed its name to "Maria Skłodowska-Curie Institute of Oncology", developing into a specialized research institute and hospital of the Polish Ministry of Health, and opening regional branches in Gliwice and Kraków. It is now the leading and most specialized cancer research and treatment center in Poland.

In May 2013, the institute was brought to international attention when it performed a full face transplant on a man who had been in an industrial accident just a few weeks prior. Just a few months later, they completed a face transplant on a woman who had been disfigured by tumor to the point the she could not eat or talk without great difficulty.

== See also ==
- Radium Institute massacre
- Bronisława Dłuska
