= Arena Ursynów =

Indoor arena in Warsaw, Poland

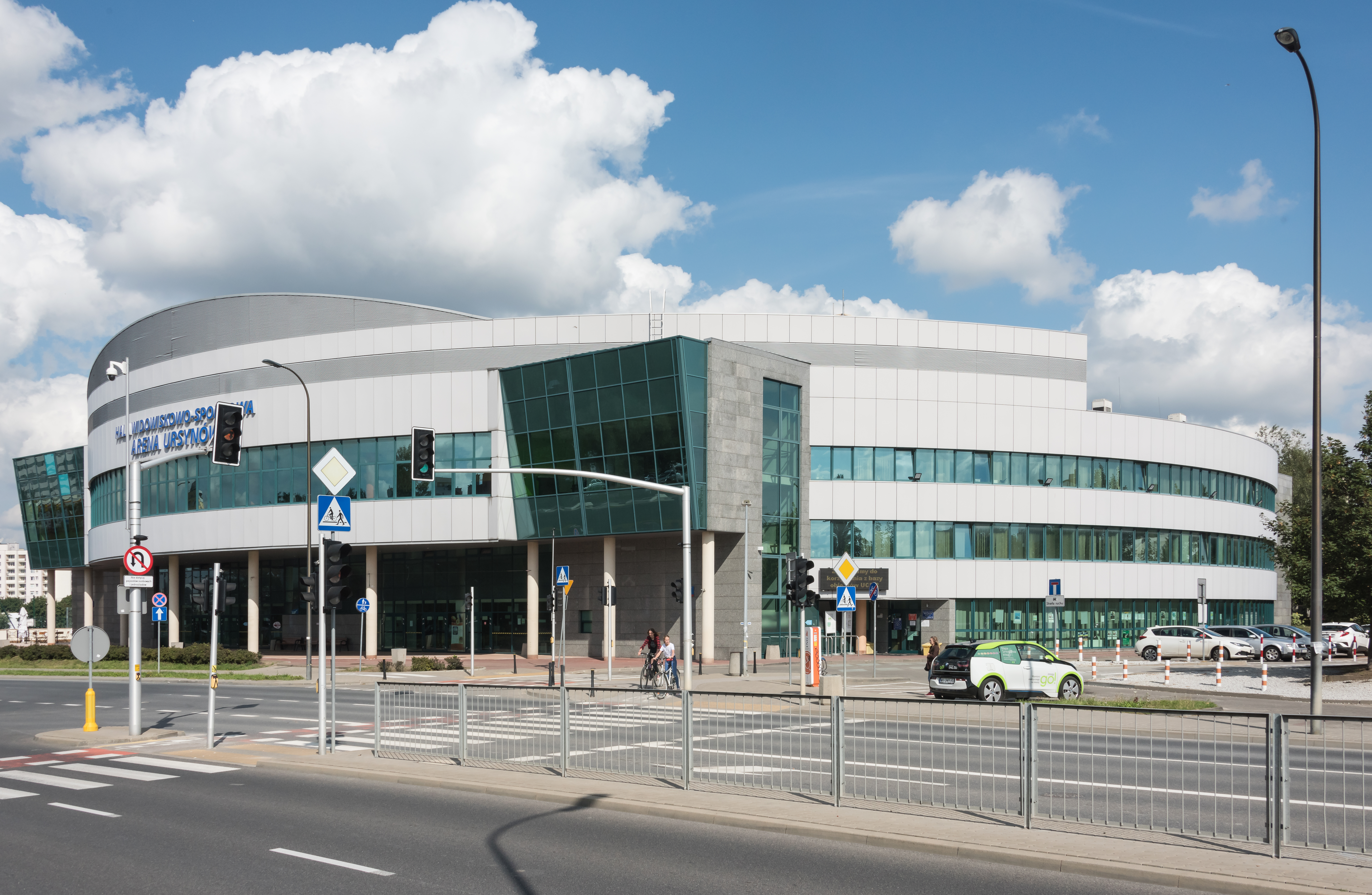
- Interactive map of Arena Ursynów
- Address: 122 Witold Pilecki Street
- Location: Warsaw, Poland
- Coordinates: 52.143139°N 21.039457°E
- Operator: Ursynów Sports and Recreation Center

Construction
- Opened: 2007; 19 years ago

Website
- www.ucsir.pl

Arena Ursynów is an indoor arena located in Warsaw, Poland. It is used as an exhibition complex, theater and sports arena. In a sports setting, the arena has a capacity of 2,000 people. Sports played at the Arena Ursynów include basketball, volleyball and badminton.

== Notable events ==
| Event | Type | Dates |
|---|---|---|
| 2010 European Men's and Women's Team Badminton Championships | Badminton | 16–21 February 2010 |
| Players Tour Championship 2011/2012 | Snooker | 29 September–2 October 2011 |
| 2017 Polish Basketball Cup | Basketball | 16–19 February 2017 |
| 2018 Polish Basketball Cup | Basketball | 15–19 February 2018 |
| 2021 Poland Open | Wrestling | 8–13 June 2021 |
