= Filipiny Płaskowickiej Street, Warsaw =

Street in Warsaw, Poland

Coordinates: 52.1366°N 21.0502°E

Płaskowickiej
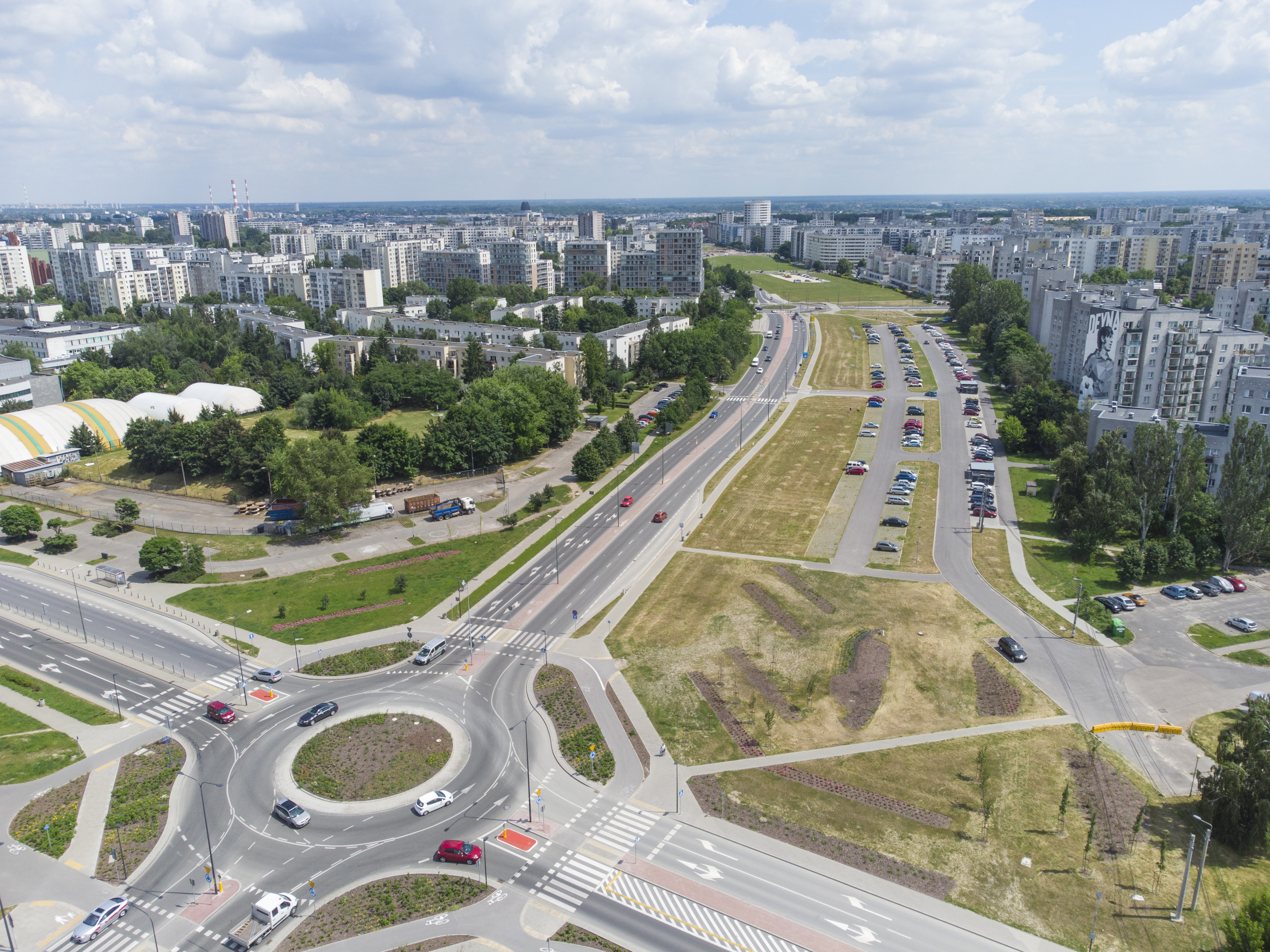
- Length: 3 km (1.9 mi)
- Location: Warsaw
- East end: Nowoursynowska street
- West end: Puławska street

Construction
- Inauguration: =1970s

Filipiny Płaskowickiej street (Polish: ulica Filipiny Płaskowickiej) is a thoroughfare which links the west and the east of Ursynów. It starts nearby the Nowoursynowska and crosses: Rosoła, Cynamonowa, Lanciego, Komisji Edukacji Narodowej, Dereniowa, Stryjeńskich, Pileckiego, Polskie Drogi and Roentgena. It has its end in the crossing with Puławska. Since 2017, the street is being rebuilt because of the construction project of the Expressway S2 including tunnel under Płaskowickiej.
