= Imielin metro station =

Warsaw metro station

Imielin
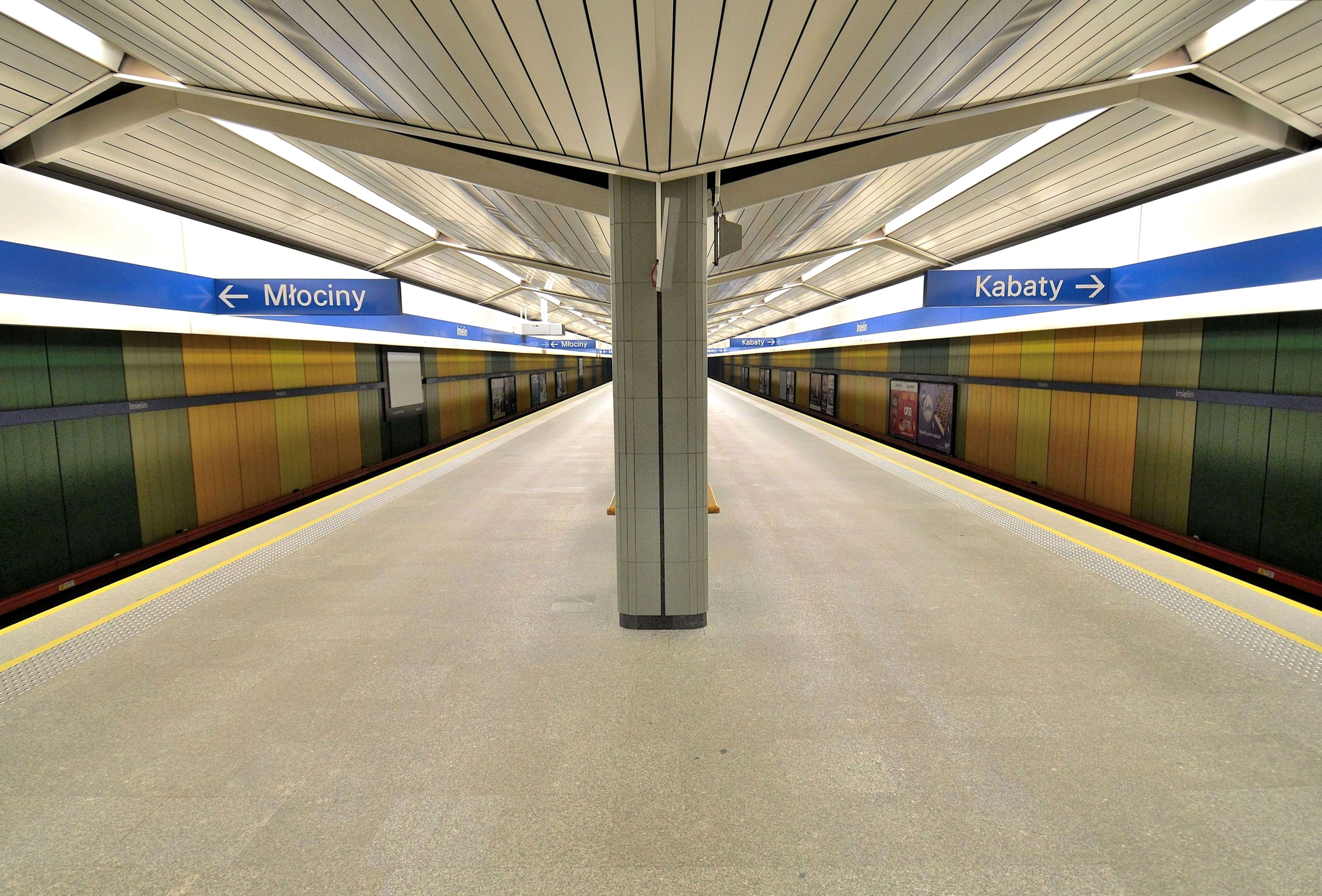

General information
- Coordinates: 52°8′57″N 21°2′47″E
- Owner: Public Transport Authority
- Platforms: 1 island platform
- Tracks: 2
- Connections: 136, 148, 179, 185, 192, 217, 263, 319, 503

Construction
- Structure type: Underground
- Platform levels: 1
- Accessible: Yes

Other information
- Station code: A-3
- Fare zone: 1

History
- Opened: 7 April 1995; 31 years ago

Services
| Preceding station | Warsaw Metro | Following station |
|---|---|---|
| Stokłosy towards Młociny | M1 line | Natolin towards Kabaty |
Location
- Location within Warsaw

Imielin (Polish pronunciation: [iˈmjɛ.lin]) is a station on Line M1 of the Warsaw Metro, located in the Imielin neighbourhood of the Ursynów district in south Warsaw at the junction of Aleja KEN and Indira Gandhi Street.

The station was opened on 7 April 1995 as part of the inaugural stretch of the Warsaw Metro, between Kabaty and Politechnika.
