= Abolition of serfdom in Poland =

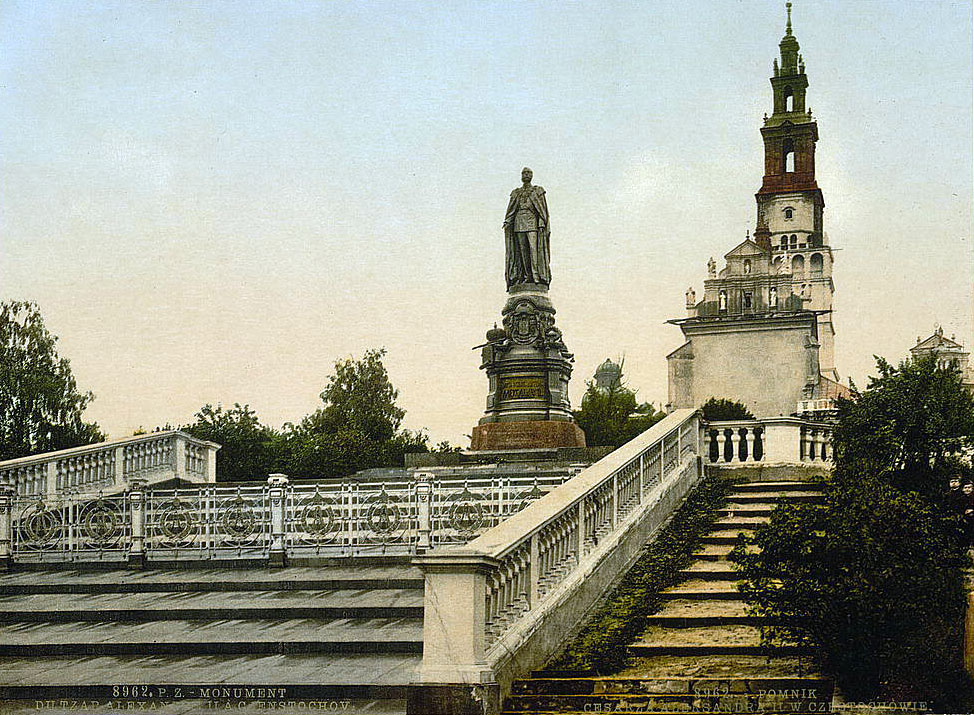
The monument of Alexander II, the "Tsar-Liberator," erected in 1899 in Częstochowa with funds voluntarily collected from Polish peasants.

Abolition of serfdom in Poland was a gradual process tied to the economy of the Polish–Lithuanian Commonwealth, where the nobility depended on serf labour for income and status. Initial steps toward reform began in the late 18th century, with the Constitution of 3 May 1791 offering limited protections to peasants and the Połaniec Proclamation of 1794 reducing some obligations of serfs and granting limited rights, such as personal freedom and protection from landlord abuses, during the Kościuszko Uprising. These efforts faced strong resistance from nobles who were reluctant to lose control over free labour.

Serfdom was finally abolished in Polish and Lithuanian territories during the 19th century as part of broader European reforms ending feudal obligations. In the Austrian partition, serfdom was abolished in 1848, following the revolutionary movements sweeping through Europe. In the Prussian partition, reforms under the Stein-Hardenberg reforms ended serfdom in 1807. In the Russian partition, the Emancipation Edict of 1861 abolished serfdom in the Russian Empire, with reforms extending to Congress Poland in 1864 following the January Uprising.

== After First Partition ==
After the First Partition of Poland of 1772, Polish peasants who found themselves in the Austrian borders noticed some changes, particularly after the Serfdom Patent of 1781. The reformed serfdom granted peasants hereditary ownership of land, they could not be removed from the land without a court order, the serfdom was limited to three days a week, the serf children could seek education outside agriculture, and the government control and administration was extended to the serfs. But still peasants could not buy the lands on their own.

Frederick the Great having gained a significant amount of land in the first partition of Poland, proceeded to introduce reforms in them which also included abolition of serfdom. The Polish peasants who found themselves in the Prussian borders noticed some small improvements, as the peasants couldn't be removed from land without a court order; they had the right to buy themselves out of serfdom, and send children to education aimed at attaining positions outside agriculture. German colonists were however given preferential treatment compared to Polish peasants. Either way, the Prussian reforms were not going as far as the Austrian ones. On the other hand, they were later discriminated because of their nationality (e.g. Drzymała's wagon and the German Kulturkampf measures).

The Polish peasants who found themselves in the Russian borders were subject to an even harsher serfdom demands than they had in Poland. They also had to serve in the Imperial Russian Army.

== In the 19th century ==
Serfdom was abolished in the Duchy of Warsaw on 22 July 1807, and in Prussia later that year on 11 November 1807. The reforms of the Congress Kingdom of Poland did not change the peasant situation significantly. The years 1830-1850 saw a raising conflict between the serfs, anti-serfdom activists and pro-serfdom governments, with increasing unrest and peasant rebellions particularly in Prussia and Austria. In Prussia, numerous smaller reforms improved the situations of peasants over the 19th century. In Austria, the reforms were spurred by the Kraków Uprising of 1846 and the Spring of Nations in 1848, resulting in the abolishment of serfdom in 1848. In 1846, in Congress Poland peasants gained protection from being removed from their land, and several other beneficial changes were also implemented. At the same time, unrest in the villages continued, affecting about 20% of those still under serfdom. Following the Emancipation reform of 1861 of Western Krai and the January Uprising of 1863-1864, an emancipation reform was introduced that went beyond that of the Russian Empire. In particular, peasants were allowed to regain some territories that they were removed from in the past.

In Austria and Russia, many reforms improving the peasant situation on the Polish territories were spurred by, and accelerated by the governments desire to ensure peasant support for them, instead of the Polish activists, and to deny the Polish activists the additional support from the simmering peasant unrest.

== See also ==
- Organic work
- Folwark
- Połaniec Manifesto
- Positivism in Poland
- Abolition of serfdom in Livonia
