= Wolica (housing estate) =

Neighbourhood in Warsaw, Poland

- Neighbourhood
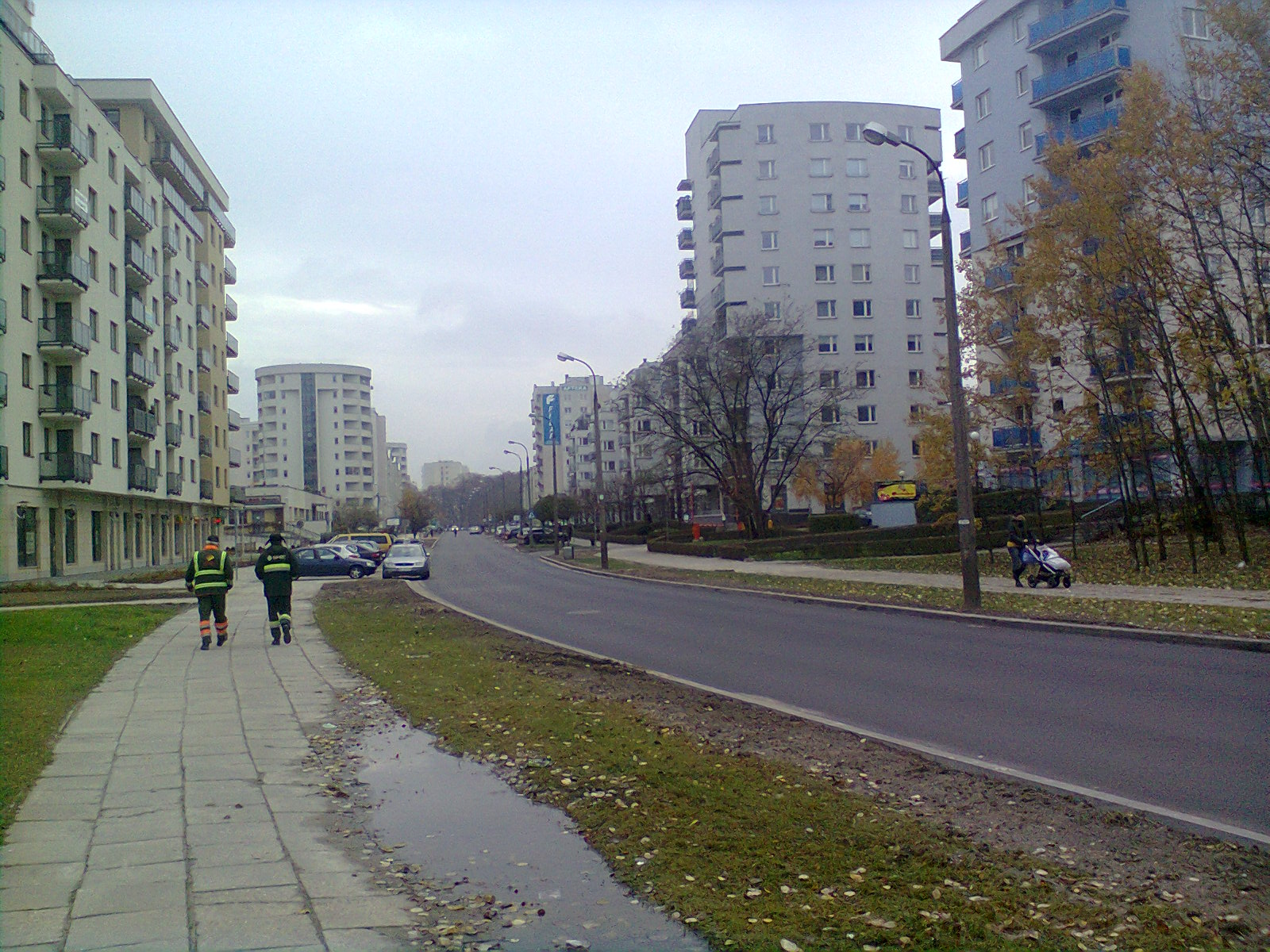
- Apartment buildings on Lanciego Street.
- Interactive map of Wolica
- Coordinates: 52.142659°N 21.060397°E
- Country: Poland
- Voivodeship: Masovian
- City and county: Warsaw
- District: Ursynów
- City Information System area: Natolin
- Time zone: UTC+1 (CET)
  - Summer (DST): UTC+2 (CEST)
- Area code: +48 22

Wolica (Polish: [vɔˈli.t͡sa]) is a housing estate in Warsaw, Poland, located in the Ursynów district, within the City Information System area of Natolin. It consists of mid- and high-rise apartment buildings and was developed in the 1980s.

== Toponomy ==
The housing estate was named after the nearby low-rise housing neighbourhood of Wolica, which historically was known as Wola Służewska. The names Wolica and Wola are related to Polish term wolność ("freedom"). Historically, since the 13th century, the name Wola was given to villages whose population had certain freedoms, such as having exemption from taxation.

== History ==
On 14 May 1951, the area was incorporated into the city of Warsaw. The housing estate of Wolica was developed in 1980s, between Płaskowickiej Street, Rosoła Street, Przy Bażantarni Street, and Komisji Edukacji Narodowej Avenue. Designed by Jacek Jan Nowicki, it consisted of mid- and high-rise apartment buildings, constructed in the large panel system technique.

In 1995, the Natolin station of the M1 line of the Warsaw Metro rapid transit underground system was opened at the intersection of Belgradzka Street and Komisji Edukacji Narodowej Avenue.

Between 1992 and 2002, the Blessed Ladislas of Gielniów Church was built at 3 Przy Bażantarni Street. The temple belongs to the Catholic denomination. Additionally, two recreational green areas, the Przy Bażantarni Park and Birch Woods Park, were opened in the area, in 2008 and 2010 respectively.

== Characteristics ==
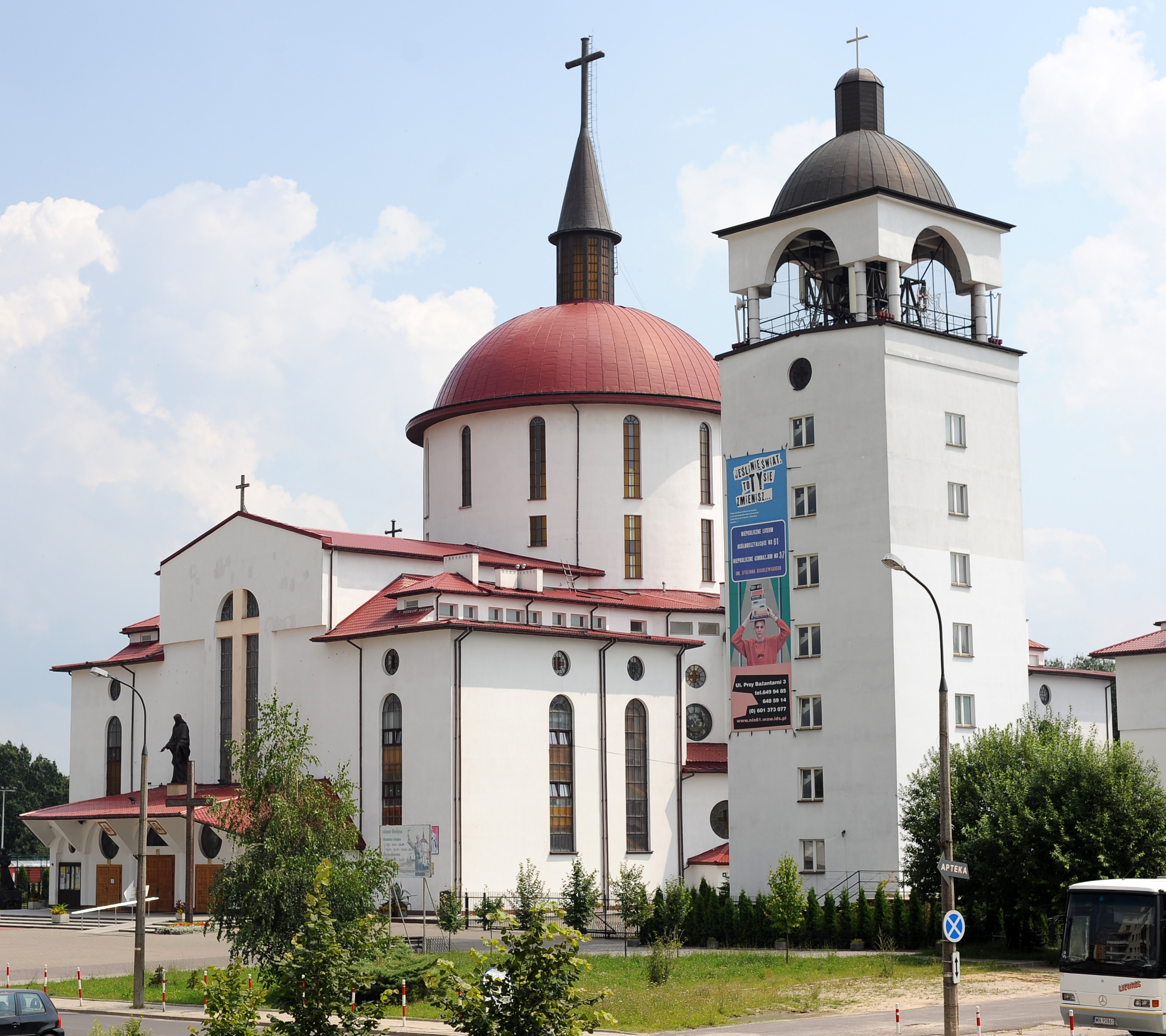
The Blessed Ladislas of Gielniów Church.

The housing estste is located between Płaskowickiej Street, Rosoła Street, Przy Bażantarni Street, and Komisji Edukacji Narodowej Avenue. It consists of mid- and high-rise apartment buildings, most of which were built using the large panel system technique in the 1980s. The area is divided into two subsections: Wolica Północna (North Wolica), and Wolica Południowa (South Wolica), separated by Belgradzka Street. The neighbourhood has the Natolin station of the M1 line of the Warsaw Metro rapid transit underground system at the intersection of Belgradzka Street and Komisji Edukacji Narodowej Avenue. Additionally, it includes two recreational green areas, the Birch Woods Park and Przy Bażantarni Park, as well as the Blessed Ladislas of Gielniów Church, which belongs to the Catholic denomination.
