= Wyżyny, Warsaw =

Neighbourhood in Warsaw, Poland

Wyżyny
- Neighbourhood
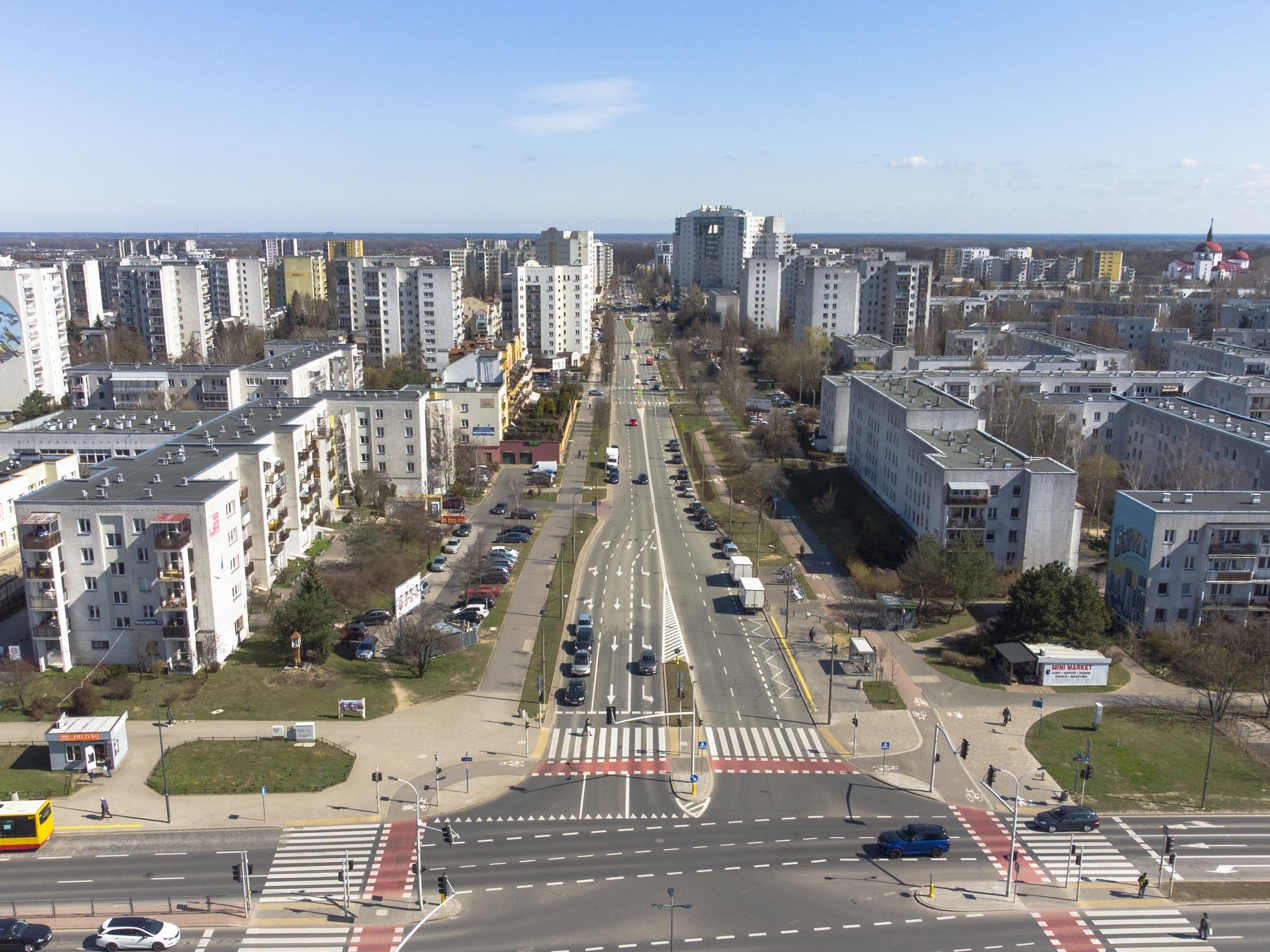
- Apartment buildings at Belgradzka Street in Wyżyny.
- Interactive map of Wyżyny
- Coordinates: 52°08′28″N 21°02′57″E
- Country: Poland
- Voivodeship: Masovian
- City and county: Warsaw
- District: Ursynów
- City Information System area: Natolin
- Time zone: UTC+1 (CET)
  - Summer (DST): UTC+2 (CEST)
- Area code: +48 22

Wyżyny (Polish: [vɘ̟ˈʐɘ̟.nɘ̟]; lit. 'the Highlands') is a neighbourhood in Warsaw, Poland, located in the Ursynów district, within the City Information System area of Natolin. It consists of mid- and high-rise apartment buildings, and was developed in the 1980s.

== History ==
On 14 May 1951, the area which would become Wyżyny, was incorporated into the city of Warsaw.

Beginning in 1981, throughout the 1980s, the housing estate of Wyżyny was developed between Płaskowickiej Street, Komisji Edukacji Narodowej Avenue, Przy Bażantarni Street, Stryjeńskich Street, Belgradzka Street, and Pileckiego Street. Designed by Jacek Jan Nowicki, it consisted of mid- and high-rise apartment buildings, constructed in the large panel system technique. In 1990, the neighbourhood had a population of approximately 30,000 people. Since 1994, the Wyżyny Housing Association (Polish: Spółdzielnia Mieszkaniowa „Wyżyny”) operates within the neighbourhood, being founded by splintering from the Natolin House Construction Association (Polish: Spółdzielnia Budownictwa Mieszkaniowego „Natolin”).

In 1995, the Natolin station of the M1 line of the Warsaw Metro rapid transit underground system was opened at the intersection of Belgradzka Street and Komisji Edukacji Narodowej Avenue.

Between 1993 and 2003, the Church of the Presentation of Jesus was also built at 21 Stryjeńskich Street. The temple belongs to the Catholic denomination.

In 2016, the Silent Unseen Park was opened to the southwest from Pileckiego Street. It includes the Three Peaks Hill, an artificial hill created in the 1970s.

== Characteristics ==
The housing estate is located between Płaskowickiej Street, Komisji Edukacji Narodowej Avenue, Przy Bażantarni Street, Stryjeńskich Street, Belgradzka Street, and Pileckiego Street. It consists of a housing estate of apartment buildings, most of which were built using the large panel system technique. The area is divided into four subsections: Wyżyny-Południe (South), Wyżyny-Środek (Centre), Wyżyny-Wschód (East), and Wyżyny-Zachód (West).

The neighbourhood has the Natolin station of the M1 line of the Warsaw Metro rapid transit underground system at the intersection of Belgradzka Street and Komisji Edukacji Narodowej Avenue. The area also includes the Church of the Presentation of Jesus located at 21 Stryjeńskich Street, belonging to the Catholic denomination, as well as the Silent Unseen Park, placed to the south of Pileckiego Street, and measuring 17.82 ha, and featuring the Three Peaks Hill, an artificial hill created in the 1970s, with a height of 133.9 m.
