= Blessed Ladislas of Gielniów Church, Gielniów =

Blessed Ladislas of Gielniów Church
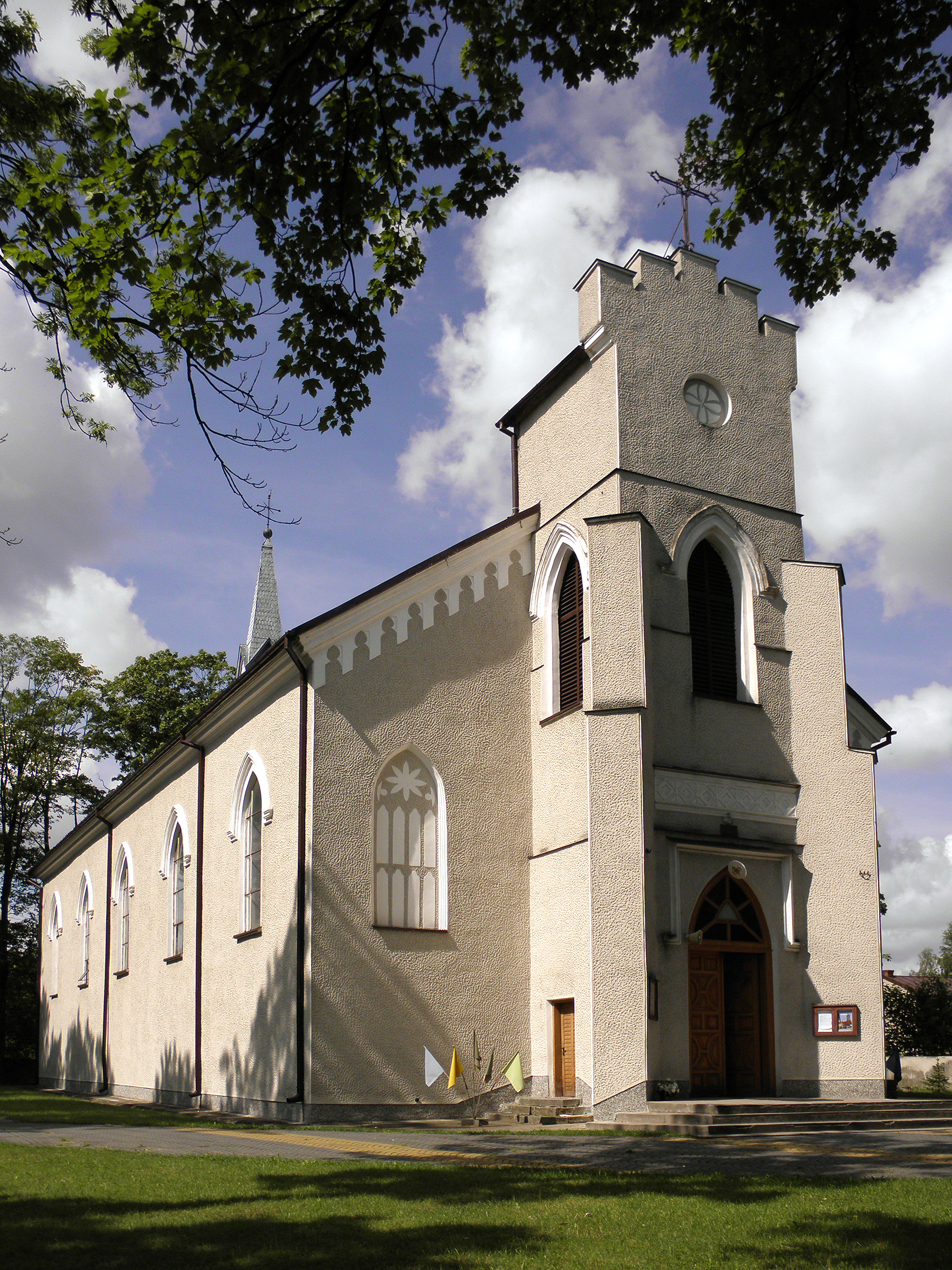
- General view
- Blessed Ladislas of Gielniów Church
- Address: ul. Opoczyńska 2, 26-434 Gielniów
- Country: Poland
- Denomination: Catholic Church

History
- Status: Parish church
- Founded: c. 1413
- Dedication: Blessed Ladislaus of Gielniów

Architecture
- Years built: 1861–1866
- Completed: 1866

Specifications
- Materials: Brick

Administration
- Diocese: Radom Diocese
- Parish: Blessed Ladislas of Gielniów Parish

The Blessed Ladislas of Gielniów Church in Gielniów, Poland, is a Roman Catholic parish church belonging to the Drzewica deanery of the Radom diocese. It is dedicated to Blessed Ladislas of Gielniów.

== History ==
The first church was likely founded in 1445 by Mściwój Mszczuj. The current church was built between 1861 and 1866. It is a brick building with three naves, oriented with the presbytery facing east, and constructed on a rectangular plan. The roof is adorned with a small tower (a sygnaturka). At the front, there is a bell tower, which houses three bells: one likely from 1768, another from 1777, and a third with no casting date. Inside, there are altars from the 19th century, made by Jan Szczepański from Opoczno. In the side altar, there is a painting of Our Lady of Częstochowa, topped with an Ecce Homo depiction, dating from the late 18th century, as well as a sculpture of Saint Barbara from the first half of the 18th century. Under the stone floor, according to Father Wiśniewski, there is an entrance to a crypt.

== Gallery ==
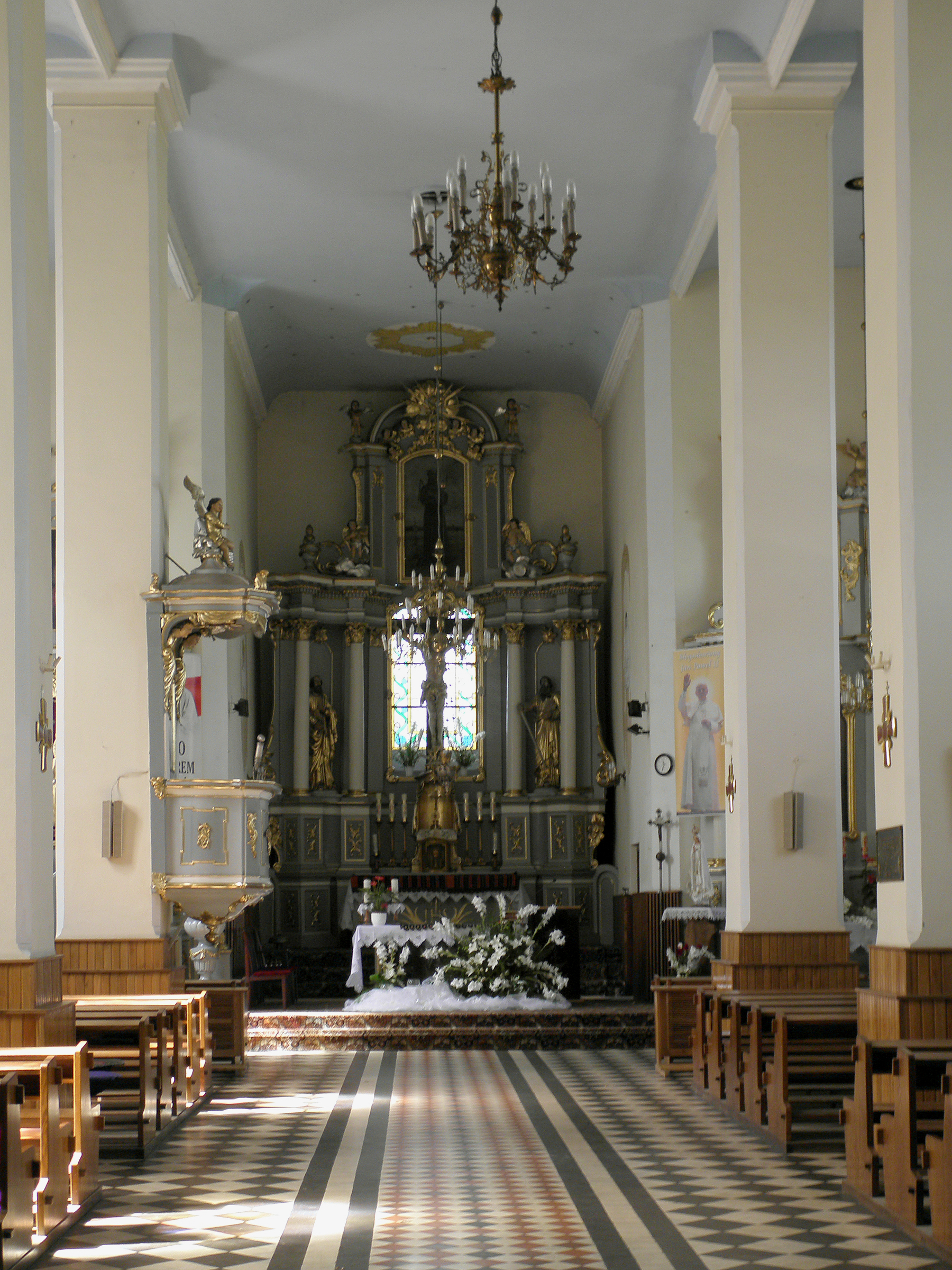
Interior of the church

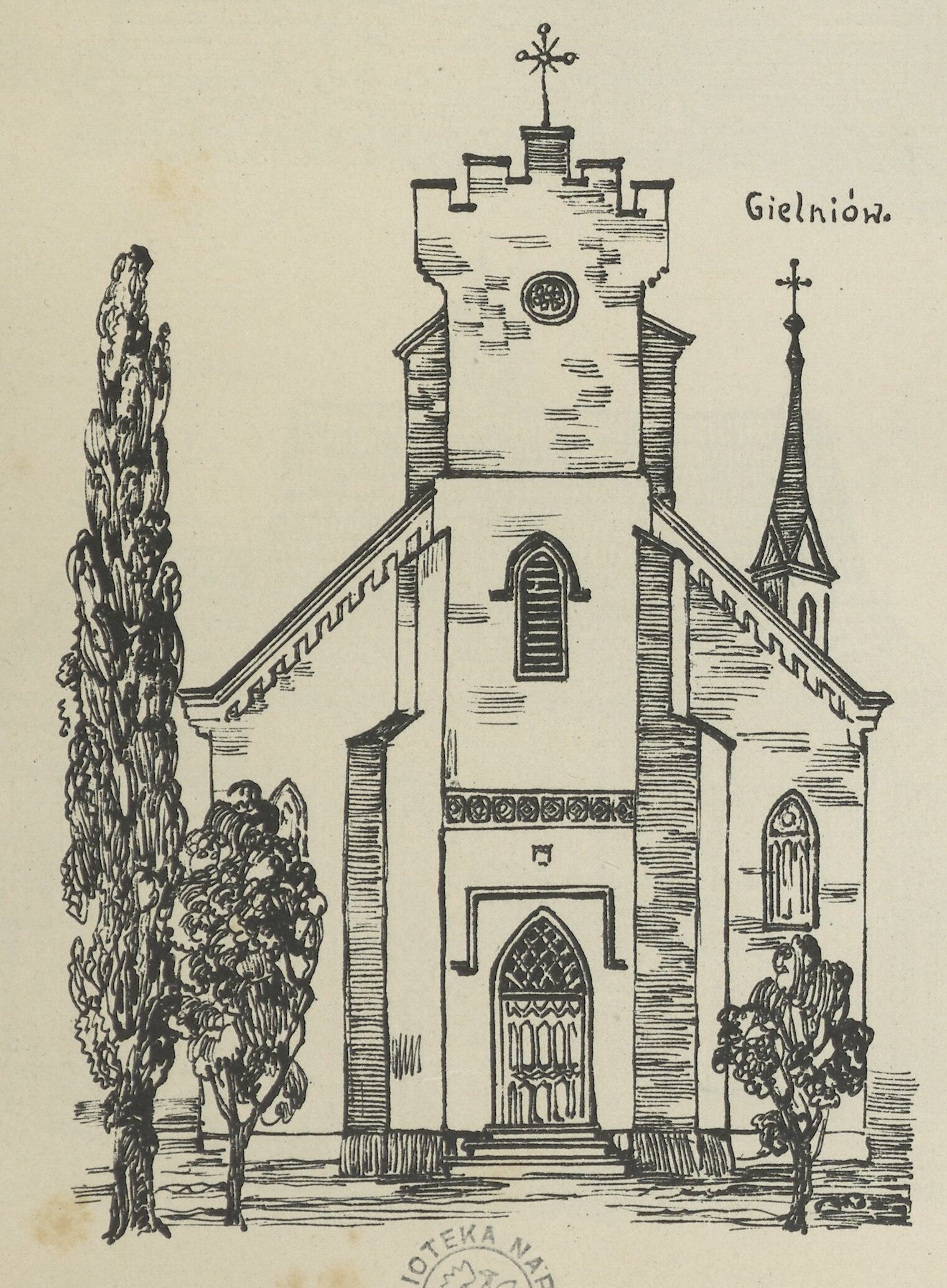
Church before 1913

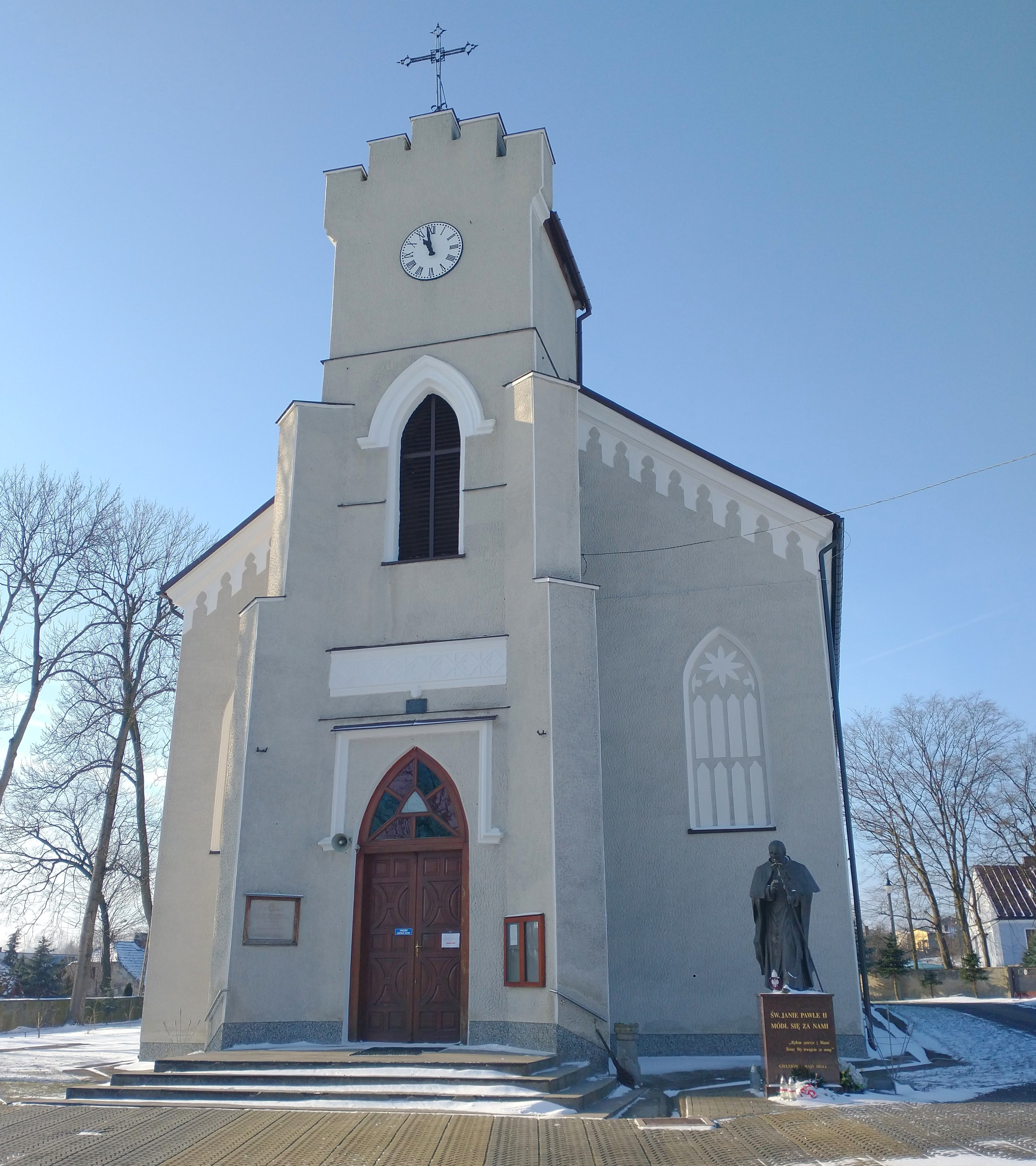
Tower

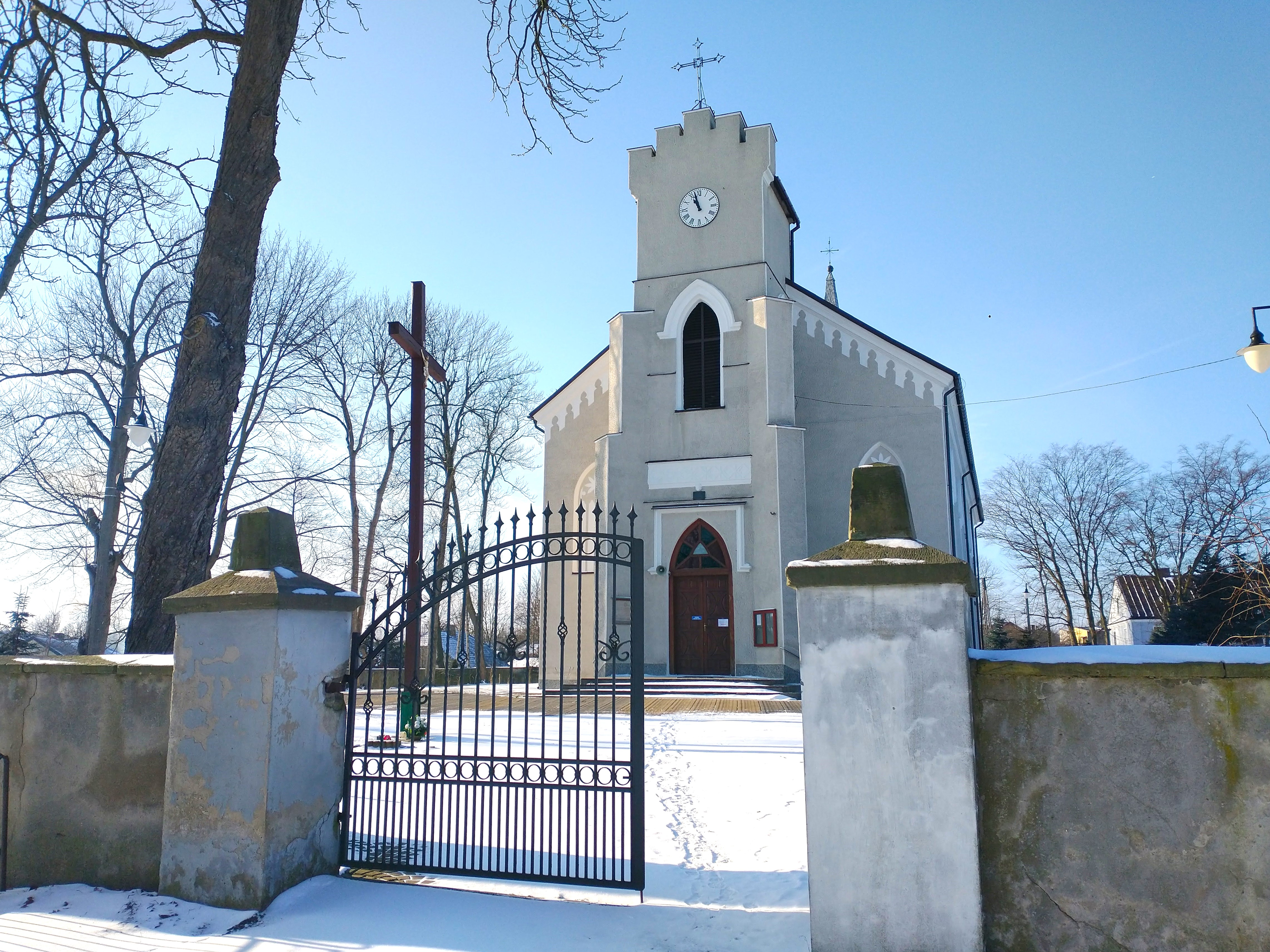
Gate

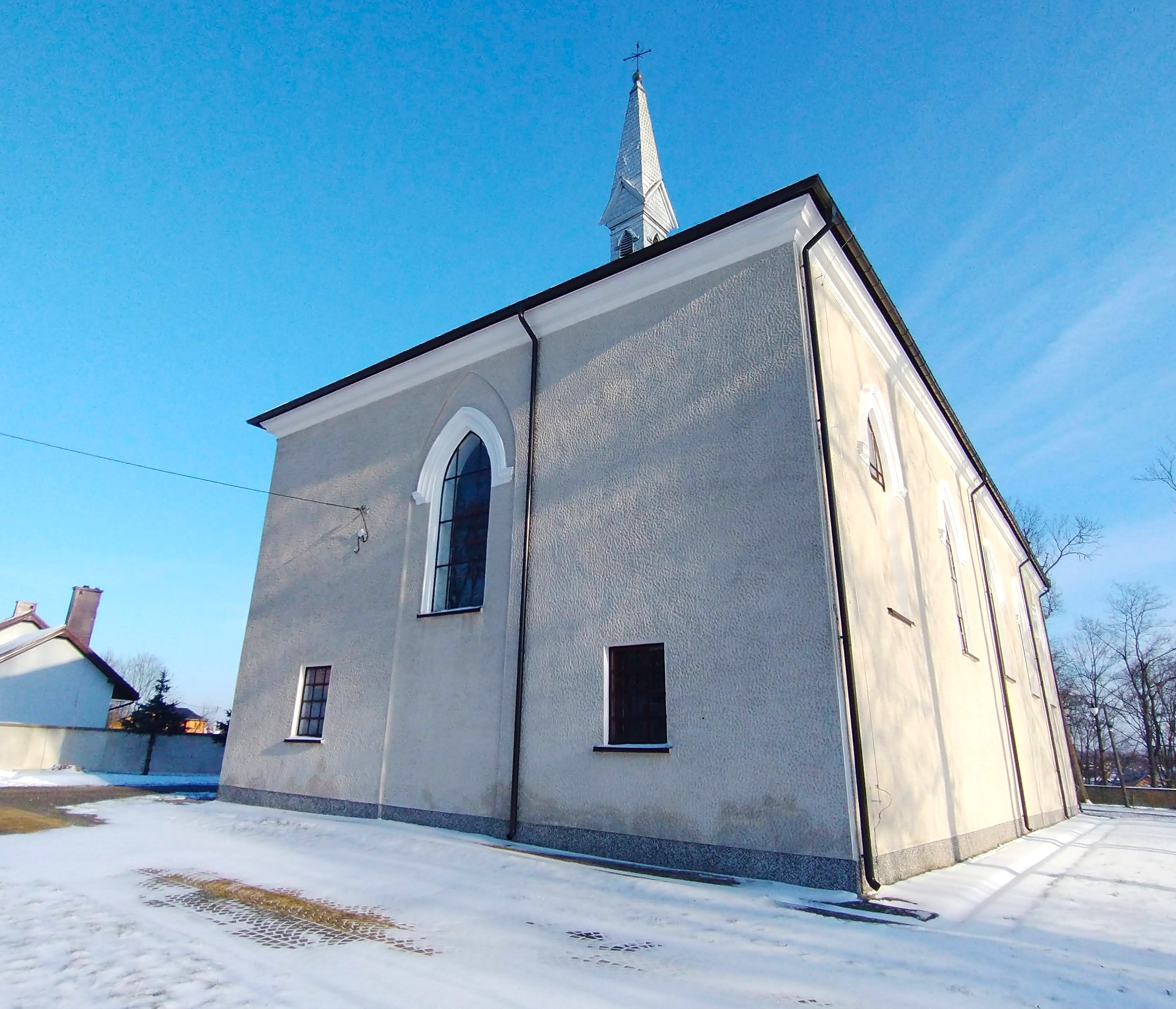
View from the presbytery

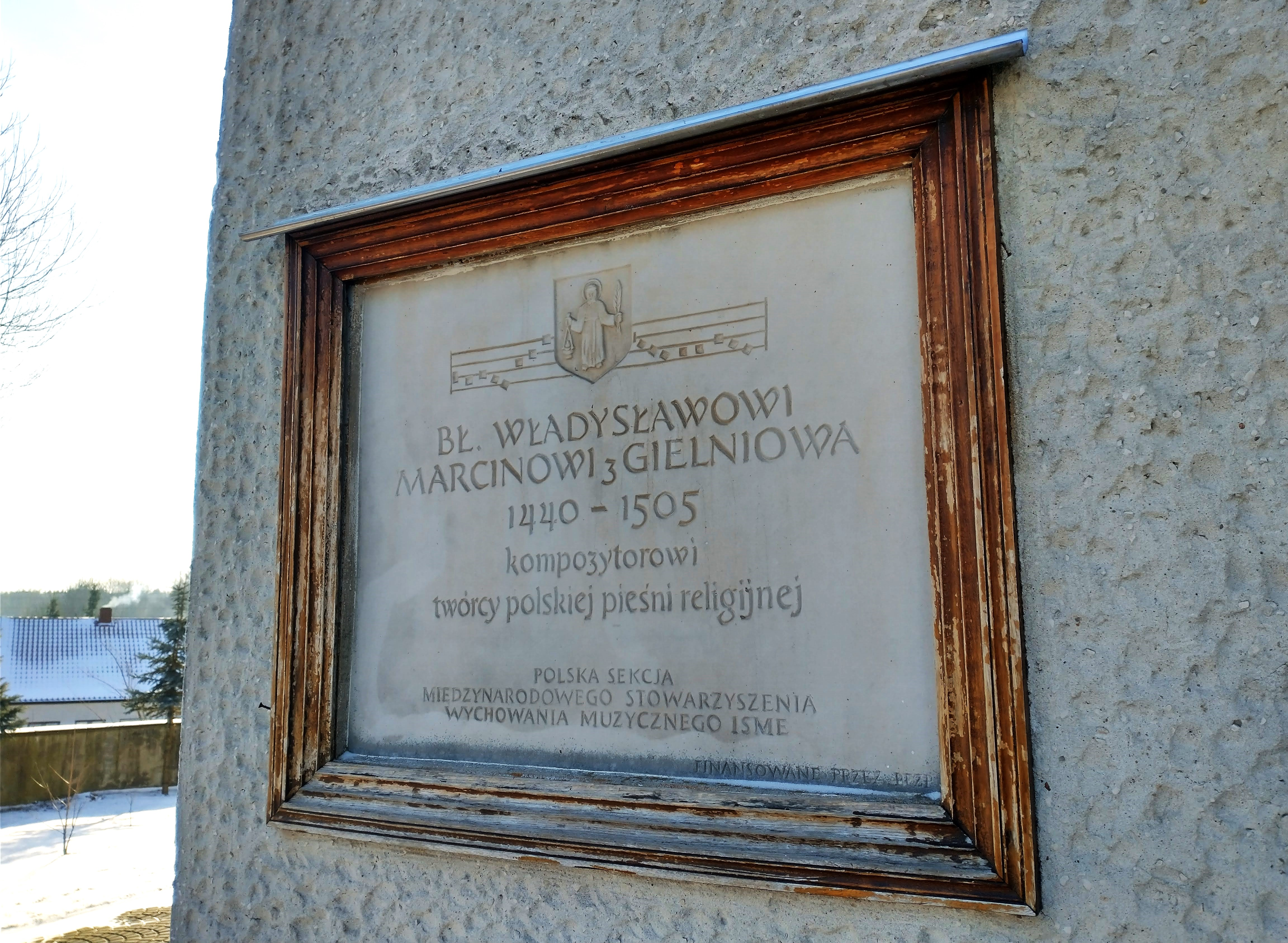
Plaque of Blessed Ladislaus
