= Blessed Ladislas of Gielniów Church =

Blessed Ladislas of Gielniów Church, or variants, may refer to the following churches:

- Blessed Ladislas of Gielniów Church, Gielniów
- Blessed Ladislas of Gielniów Church, Olbrachcice
- Blessed Ladislas of Gielniów Church, Warsaw
