= Przy Bażantarni Park =

Urban park in Warsaw, Poland

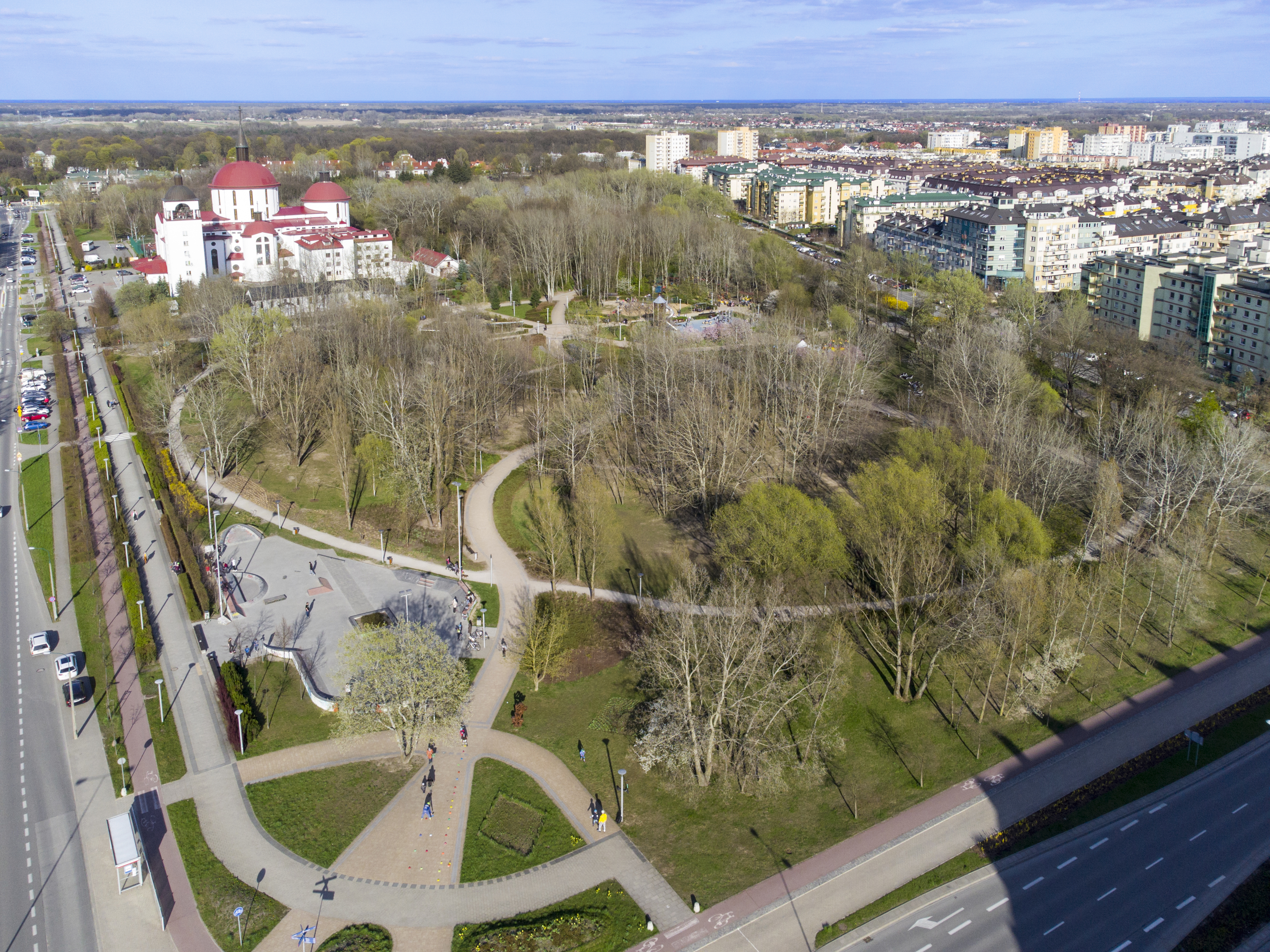
- The park in 2021, as seen from northwest.
- Interactive map of Przy Bażantarni Park
- Type: Urban park
- Location: Ursynów, Warsaw, Poland
- Coordinates: 52°08′11″N 21°03′50″E
- Area: 9.79 hectares (24.2 acres)
- Created: 2008

The Przy Bażantarni Park (Note: Polish pronunciation: [ˈpʂɘ̟ ba.ʐanˈtar.ɲi]; Polish: Park Przy Bażantarni, lit. 'park next to the pheasantry') is an urban park in Warsaw, Poland, within the district of Ursynów. It is located in the neighbourhood of Natolin, between Rosoła Street, Przy Bażantarni Street, Jeżewskiego Street, and Komisji Edukacji Narodowej Avenue. It was opened in 2008.

== History ==
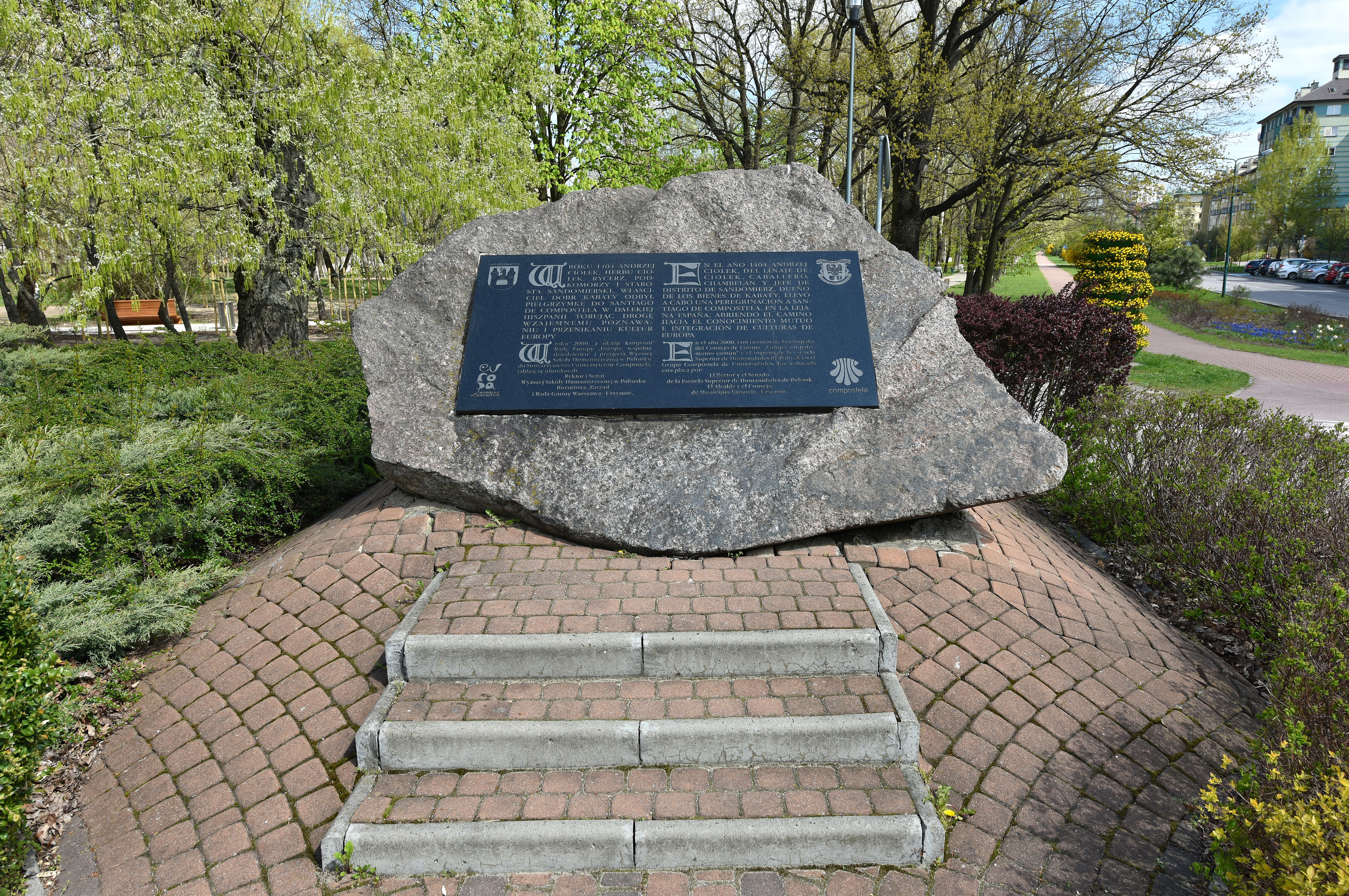
The monument dedicated to travel of Andrzej Ciołek of Żelechów to Spain in 1404, unveiled in 2000. Photography made in 2017.

The area was designed as an urban green space in 1975 during the planning of the neighbourhood of Natolin, which surrounds it. It was decided to keep it undeveloped, to preserve the view seen from the nearby Potocki Palace.

In 2000, a monument dedicated to travel of Andrzej Ciołek of Żelechów to Spain in 1404, was unveiled at the intersection of Komisji Edukacji Narodowej Avenue and Jeżewskiego Street, within future park. It has a form of a glacial erratic rock with a commemorative plaque installed oh it. Originally, it read that Andrzej Ciołek went on a pilgrimage to Santiago de Compostela. However, while it remains a popular assumption, his travel remains too undocumented for his destination and motives to be known. As such, in 2024, the information on the plaque was changed to simply inform that he had traveled to Spain. It was financed by the Pułtusk Academy of Humanities, to commemorate its ascendancy into the Compostela Group of Universities.

The development of the park begun in 2008, with the construction of the sports fields complex, which included the amenities for the association football, basketball, volleyball, and tennis. In 2010, it was expanded with its middle section, which included children's playgrounds, ropes course, and tables for chess and boardgames. A small observation deck in a form on an elevated bridge, was also built in the park's centre. The same year, an alley of linden trees, donated by the nurseries in Czechia, was planted alongside Przy Bażantarni Street.

The main promenade was developed between 2012 and 2013. In December 2012, three sculptures were placed in the park. One of them is a steel installation by Michał Frydrych, consisting of red letters forming text "rzeźba w parku", which translates to "a sculpture in the park". The remaining two, made by Tomasz Górnicki, depict large heads of painters Wojciech Kossak and Julian Fałat, and commemorate their pistol duel, which took place on 17 December 1900, in the area of the future park. In 2014, skatepark was added. In 2024, the northern portion of the park underwent renovations, during which a dog park and a parkour area were added.

Since March 2015, a parkrun in hosted there every Saturday.

== Characteristics ==
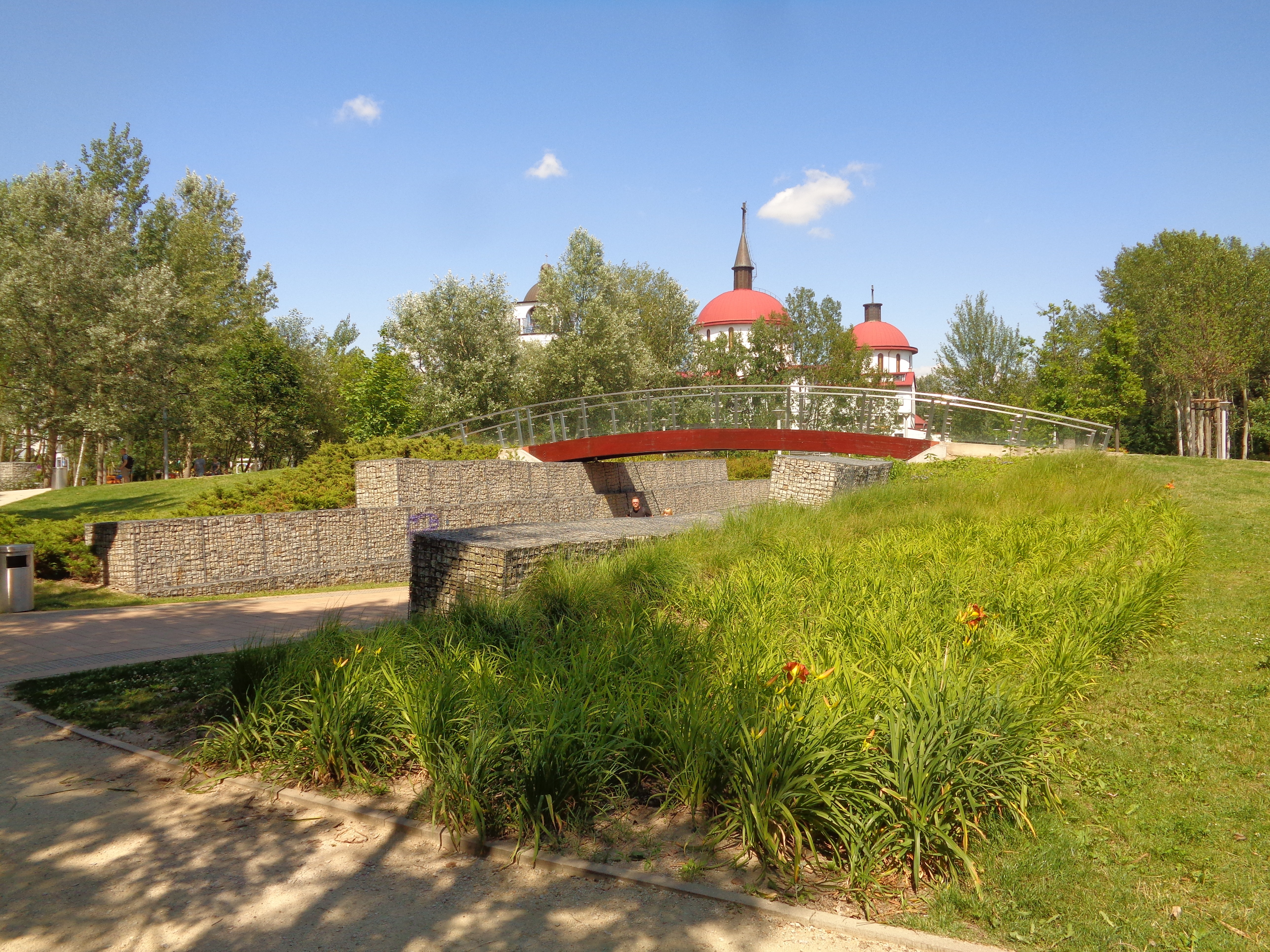
The observation deck bridge.

The park is located between Rosoła Street, Przy Bażantarni Street, Jeżewskiego Street, and Komisji Edukacji Narodowej Avenue. To the north it borders the Blessed Ladislas of Gielniów Church, and to the south, with a garden farm. It has the total area of 9.79 ha. Its northeastern part, with an area of 5.4 ha, consisting of a small woodland. It includes a pedunculate oak, which since 1973 has the status of a natural monument.

The park includes sports amenities for association football, basketball, volleyball, and tennis, as well as a skatepark, ropes course, parkour area, dog park, playground, and tables for chess and boardgames. In the centre is also located small observation deck in a form on an elevated bridge. Alongside Przy Bażantarni Street is an alley with linden trees, which were donated by nurseries in Czechia. Every Saturday, in the park is hosted a parkrun.

In the park, at the intersection of Komisji Edukacji Narodowej Avenue and Jeżewskiego Street was unveiled a monument dedicated to travel of Andrzej Ciołek of Żelechów to Spain in 1404. It has a form of a glacial erratic rock with a commemorative plaque. There are also placed three sculptures. One of them is a steel installation by Michał Frydrych consisting of red letters forming text rzeźba w parku, which translates to a sculpture in the park. The remaining two, made by Tomasz Górnicki, depict large heads of painters Wojciech Kossak and Julian Fałat, and commemorate their pistol duel that took place in the park on 17 December 1900.

== Gallery ==
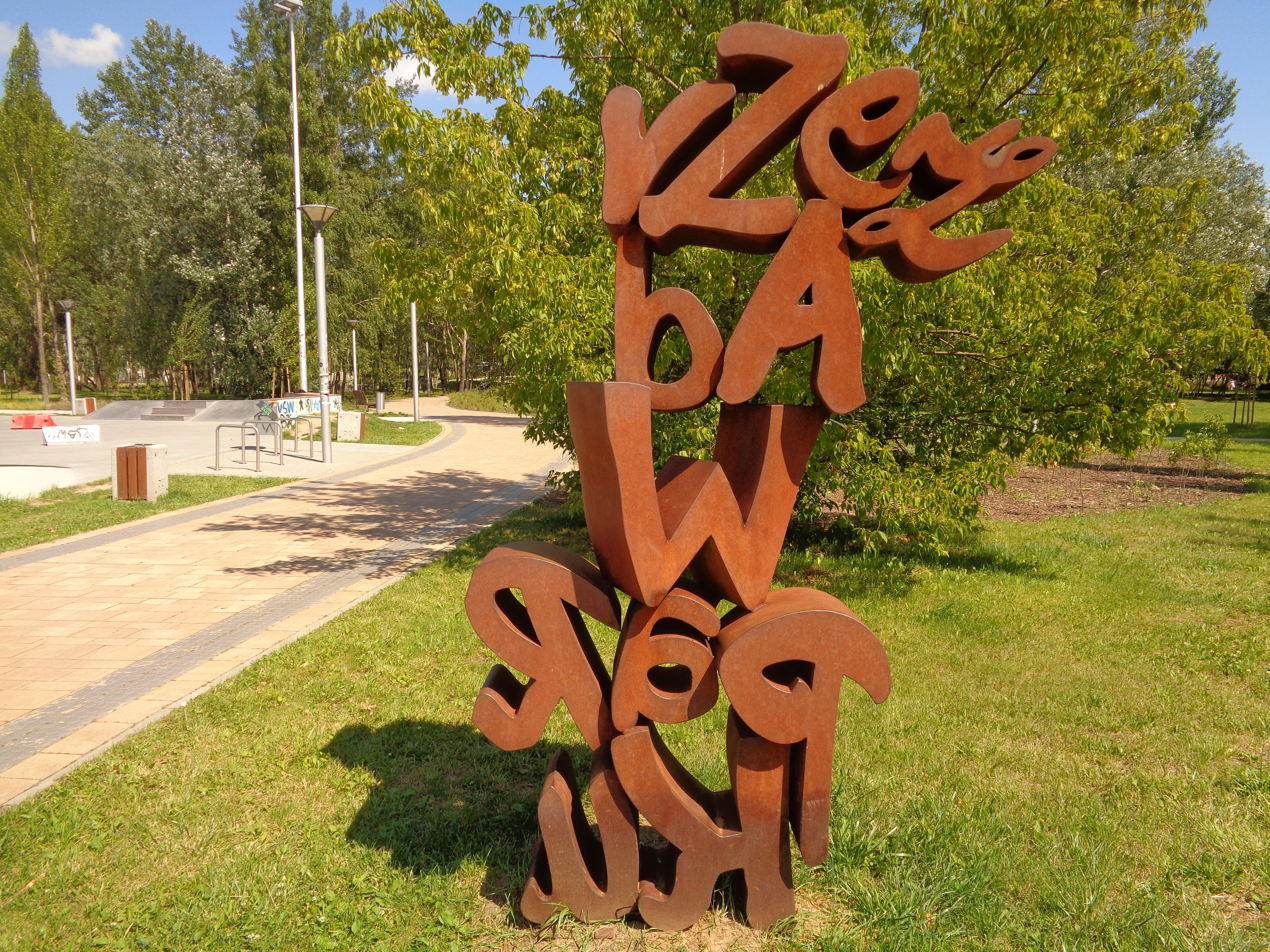
Sculpture in the Park by Michał Frydrych.

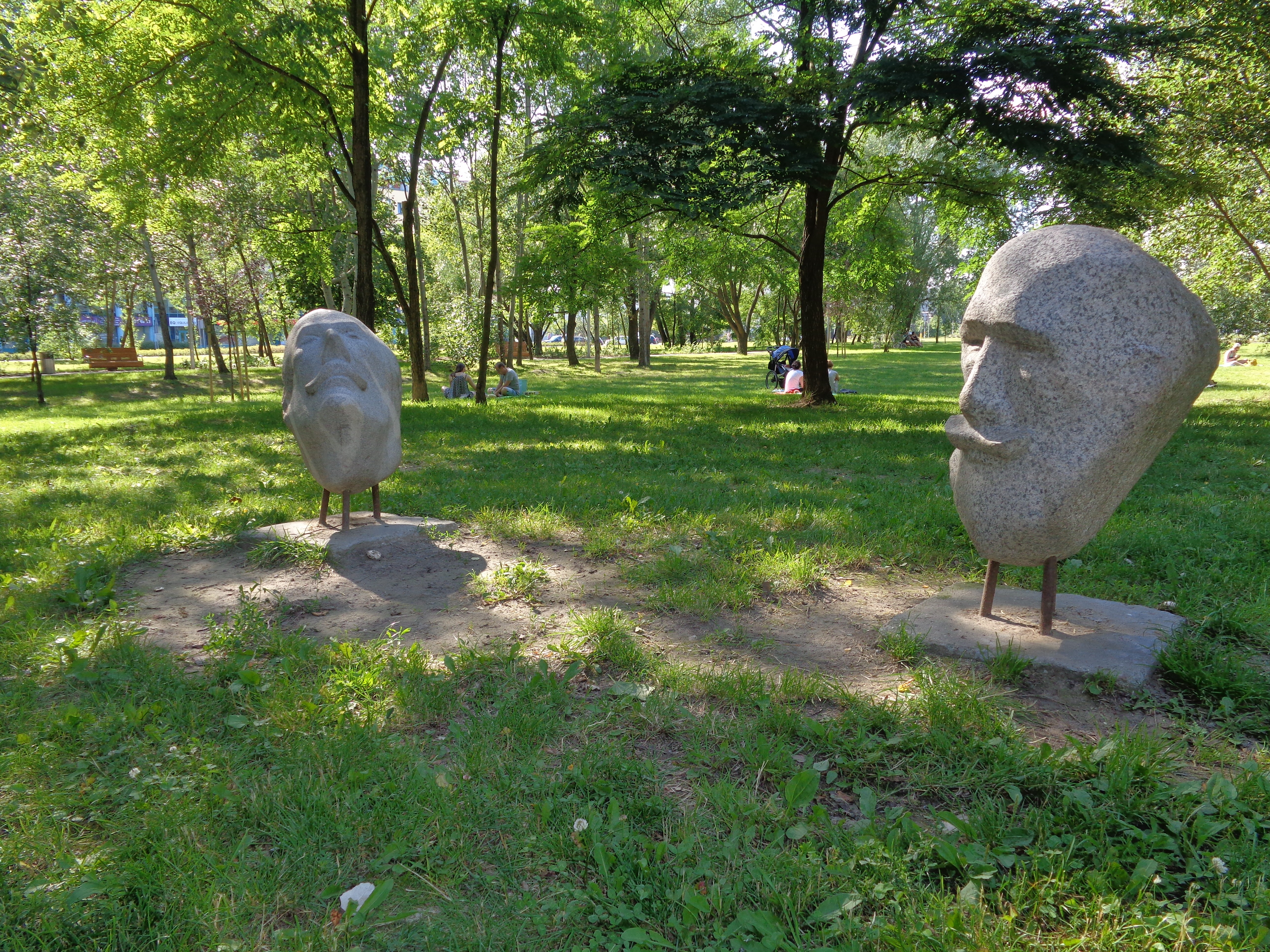
Sculptures of the heads of Wojciech Kossak and Julian Fałat by Tomasz Górnicki.
