= Natolin =

Neighbourhood in Warsaw, Poland

- City Information System area (neighbourhood)
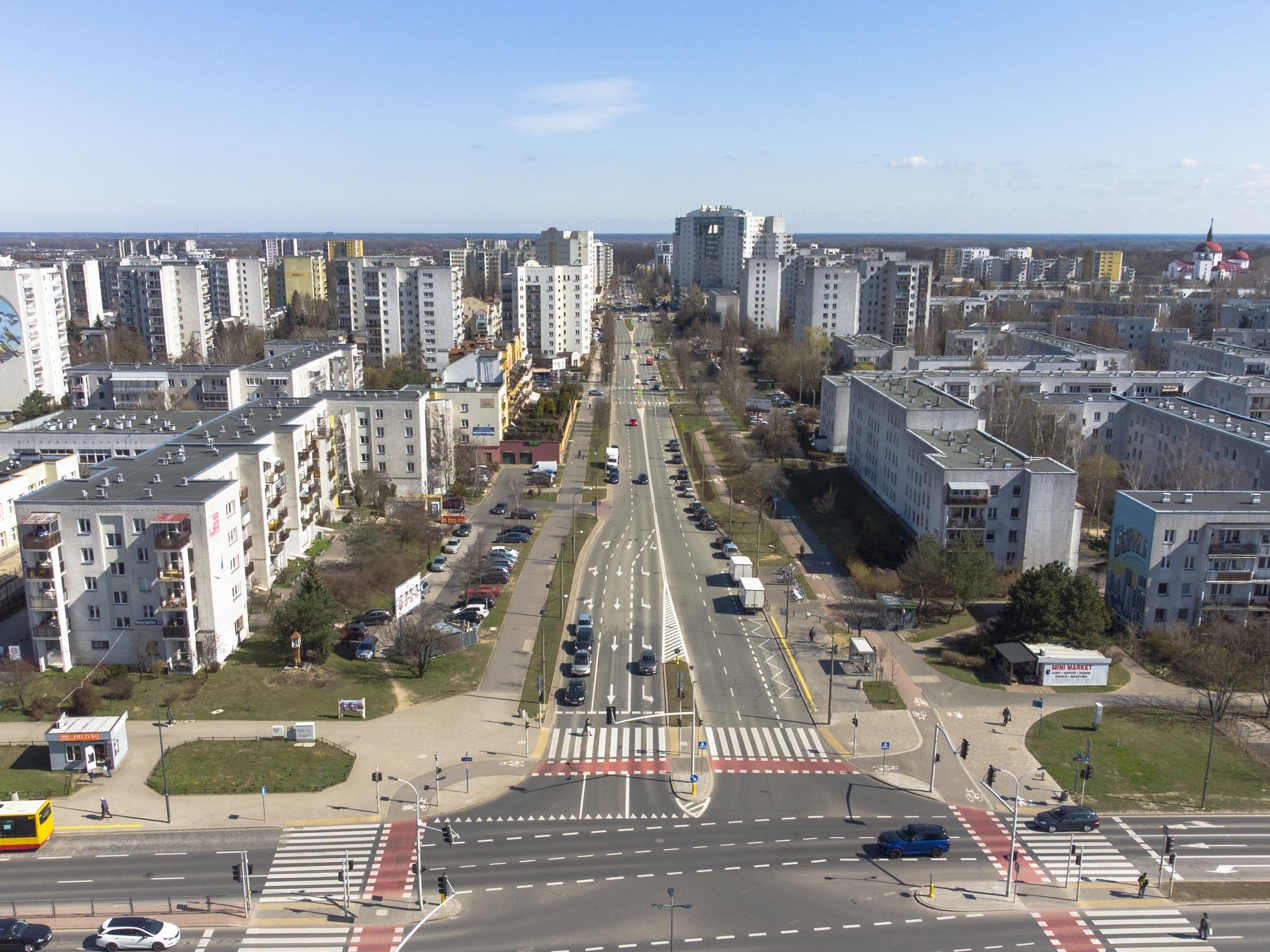
- Apartment buildings at Belgradzka Street in Natolin.

- Natolin within the Ursynów district
- Coordinates: 52°08′23″N 21°03′27″E
- Country: Poland
- Voivodeship: Masovian
- City and county: Warsaw
- District: Ursynów
- Time zone: UTC+1 (CET)
  - Summer (DST): UTC+2 (CEST)
- Area code: +48 22

Natolin (Polish: [naˈtɔ.lin]) is a neighbourhood, and a City Information System area, in Warsaw, Poland, within the Ursynów district. It is a predominantly a high-rise multifamily residential area, with housing estates of Wolica, and Wyżyny, and with a smaller presence of low-rise single-family housing in Moczydło, located in the southwest. The neighbourhood also includes the Natolin station of the M1 line of the Warsaw Metro rapid transit underground system. Additionally, the neighbourhood is widely associated with the Natolin Park, which contains Potocki Palace. They are placed just outside its boundaries, within the district of Wilanów.

The village of Moczydło was present in the area by 1528. Between 1780 and 1783, the Potocki Palace, was also buil nearby. It became a residence of the Czartoryski and, later, Potocki families. The palace was rebuilt in its current form in 1838. In 1879, a horse stable was built in Moczydło, as the village became specialised in breeding horses for the local upper class. In the 1930s, it became a supplier for the newly-opened nearby Służewiec Racecourse, and remained as such until Second World War. The area was incorporated into Warsaw in 1951. Throughout the 1980s and 1990s, the housing estates of Wolica and Wyżyny, were developed in Natolin, featuring high-rise apartment buildings. In 1995, the Natolin station of the Warsaw Metro opened.

== Toponomy ==
The name Natolin was given by nobility and landowners Aleksander Stanisław Potocki and Anna Tyszkiewicz, the owners of the Potocki Palace, to celebrate the birth of their daughter, Natalia Potocka in 1807. It became associated with the Natolin Woods, which contained the aforementioned palace. In the 1980s, the name was used for an urban development area, containing the housing estates of Wolica and Wyżyny.

== History ==
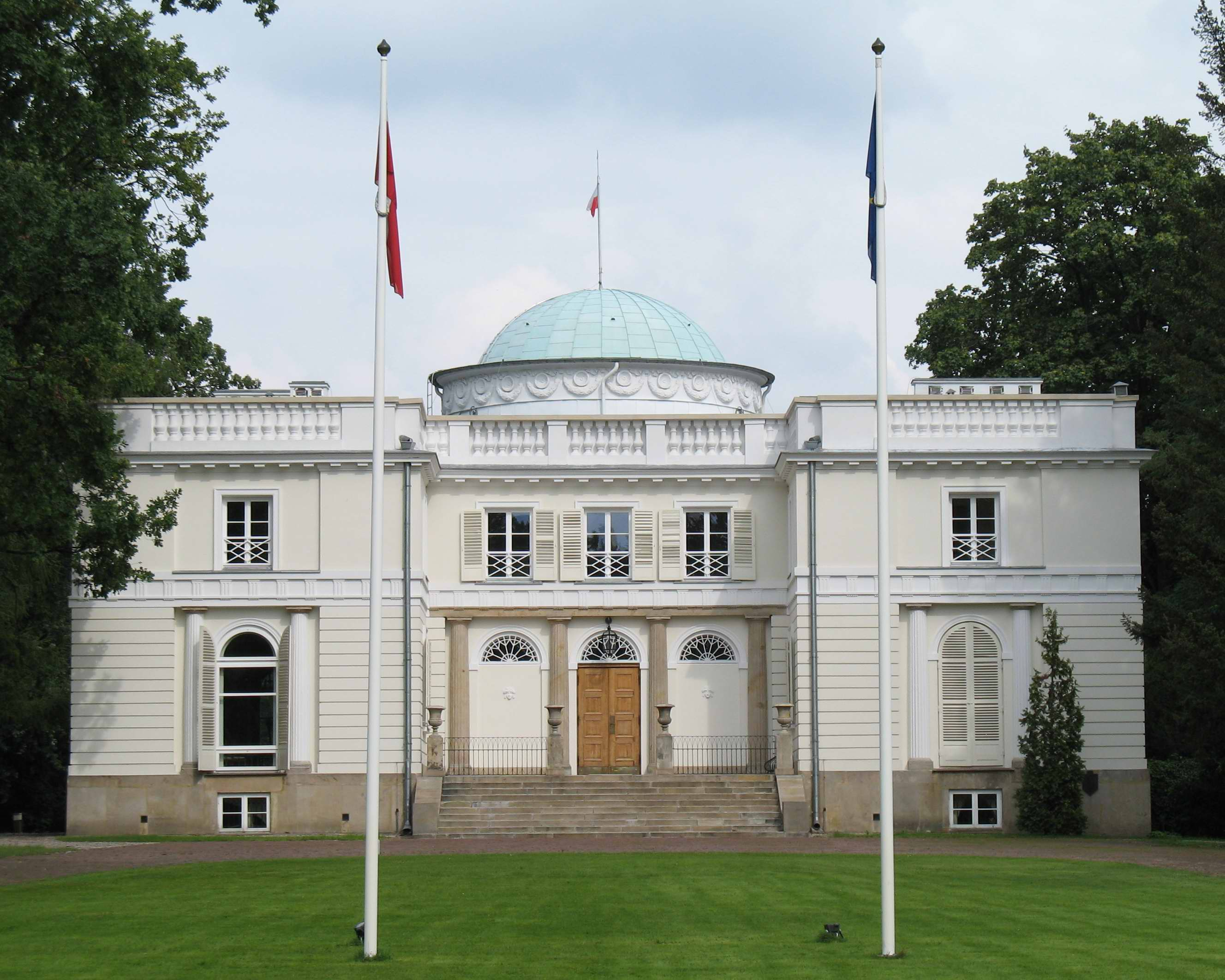
The Potocki Palace, built in 1838.

The settlement of Moczydło was present in the area by 1528. It was a small farming community, located on a road leading to Imielin, within the Catholic St. Catherine Parish. The village was owned and inhabited by a petty nobility. Between 1580 and 1658, it and its adjusted farmlands had an area of approximately 9 hectares, and in 1661, it had 5 houses. The village was owned by the Dąbrowski family until 1725, when it was sold together with Wolica to Elżbieta Sieniawska, owner of the Wilanów Estate, for the price of 60,000 złoties. She also ordered protection of the nearby Kabaty Woods from deforestation.

At the end of the 16th century, King John III Sobieski established within the area of the current Natolin, a designated royal area for animal hunting as part of the nearby Wilanów Palace complex. In 1730, the estate owners, Maria Zofia Czartoryska and August Aleksander Czartoryski, leased it to King Augustus II the Strong, who turned it into the pheasantry. As such, the area became known as Bażantaria (Polish for pheasantry). It was designed in French Baroque style, with paths branching out away from the main building, similarly to those in Palace of Versailles. In 1733, the property was returned to its owners.

In 1780, August Aleksander Czartoryski begun the construction of his residence within the area, which later became known as the Potocki Palace. The Neoclassical palace was designed by a renowned architect Szymon Bogumił Zug, while the interior design was prepared by Vincenzo Brenna. It featured a distinctive half-open salon, with a view of the forest below the Warsaw Escarpment. Its construction was finished in 1782, and following Czartoryski's death the same year, it was inherited by his daughter, Elżbieta Izabela Lubomirska. In 1799, it became a wedding gift to her daughter Aleksandra Lubomirska and brother-in-law Stanisław Kostka Potocki, and in 1805, it was inherited by their son Aleksander Stanisław Potocki and his wife Anna Tyszkiewicz. In 1807, following the birth of their daughter, Natalia Potocka, the area was renamed after her to Natolin. The palace was rebuilt in 1808, with new design done by Chrystian Piotr Aigner, and again between 1834 and 1838, with design by Enrico Marconi. In 1892, it was inherited by the Branicki family.

In 1775, the village of Moczydło had 7 houses, and in 1785, 10 houses. In 1827, it had 10 houses and 80 inhabitants. Between 1850 and 1861, the population of Moczydło fought in court to lower costs of their feudal duties. Following the abolition of serfdom in 1864, the village was incorporated into the municipality of Wilanów. At the time it was inhabited by 131 people and included 360 ha of privately owned farmland, and 36 ha of nobility-owned farmland. In 1905, it had 20 houses and 146 inhabitants.

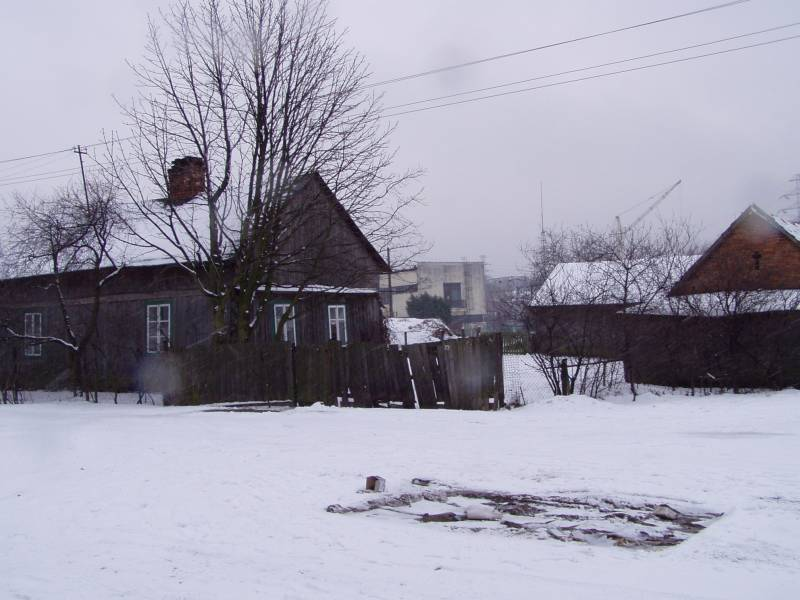
Historical farming building at Wełniana Street in Natolin.

In 1879, a horse stable owned by count Ludwik Józef Krasiński was built in Moczydło, while the village itself became specialised in breeding horses for the local upper class. In the 1930s, it became a supplier for the newly opened nearby Służewiec Racecourse. It operated until the beginning of the Second World War. Following the end of the conflict, the farmlands of Moczydło were nationalised, and in 1956, they were donated to the Warsaw University of Life Sciences. The ruins of the stable survive to the present day, now with the status of a protected cultural property.

During the Second World War, while Warsaw was under the German occupation, the Natolin Woods near the Potocki Palace became a site of one of the first war crimes committed by the Nazi Germany officers in the city. Sometime between 13 and 17 November 1939, fifteen Polish men were executed by shooting. The bodies were exhumed in 1971, and in 2022, the tragedy was commemorated with a small monument erected near the palace. During the Warsaw Uprising, and following its end, the palace was devastated and plundered by German forces, together with other wealthy buildings in Natolin.

In 1945, the Potocki Palace was nationalised, and placed under the administration of the Warsaw National Museum. It was renovated and turned into the official residence of the President of Poland, Bolesław Bierut. Later it was used by the Council of Ministers Office. In 1991, an area of approximately 100 ha in the Natolin Park received the status of a nature reserve under the name Natolin Woods. In 1992, the palace became the campus of the branch of the College of Europe, with several other university buildings being develop around it.

Natolin and Moczydło were incorporated into the city of Warsaw on 14 May 1951.

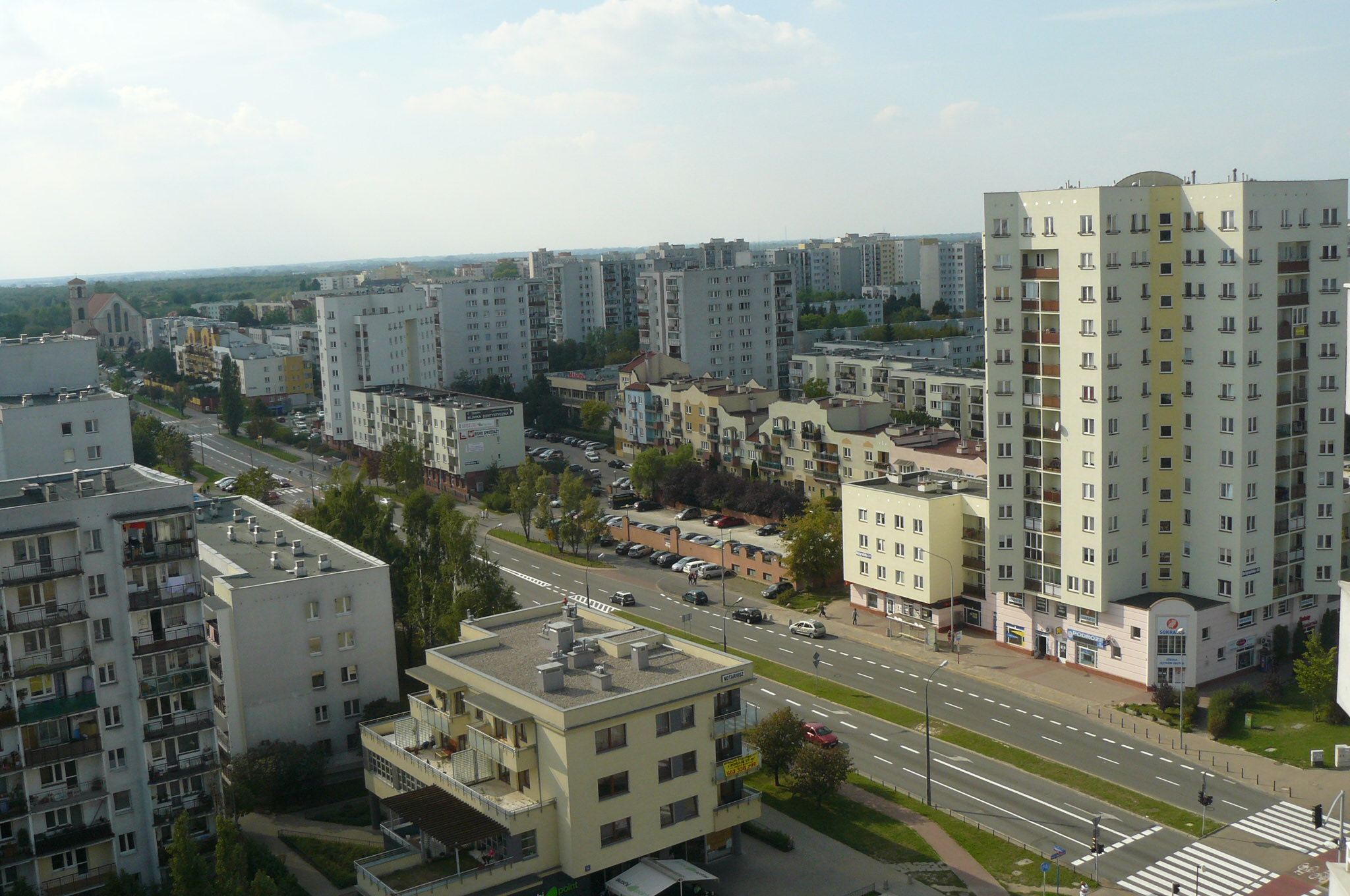
Buildings in Wyżyny at Belgradzka Street, developed in the 1980s.

Beginning in 1981, the series of housing estate the Wolica and Wyżyny, were developed in the area of Natolin, consisting of high-rise apartment buildings built in a large panel system technique. Both developments were designed by Jacek Jan Nowicki.

In 1994, the neighbourhood became part of the then-established city district of Ursynów. Natolin Park and Potocki Palace, historically associated with it, became part of Wilanów instead. In 1998, the district was subdivided into the areas of the City Information System, with Natolin becoming one of them. In 1995, the Natolin station of the M1 line of the Warsaw Metro rapid transit underground system was opened at the intersection of Belgradzka Street and Komisji Edukacji Narodowej Avenue. Between 1992 and 2003, two Catholic temples were built in Natolin, including the Blessed Ladislas of Gielniów Church at 3 Przy Bażantarni Street, and the Church of the Presentation of Jesus was also built at 21 Stryjeńskich Street.

Between 2002 and 2004, the housing estate of VitaParc was developed in the area of 13 Stryjeńskich Street, consisting of five multifamily residential buildings. Throughout 2000s and 2010s, four urban parks were developed in the neighbourhood, including Przy Bażantarni Park opened in 2008, Moczydełko Park in 2009, Birch Woods Park in 2010, and Silent Unseen Park in 2016.

== Characteristics ==
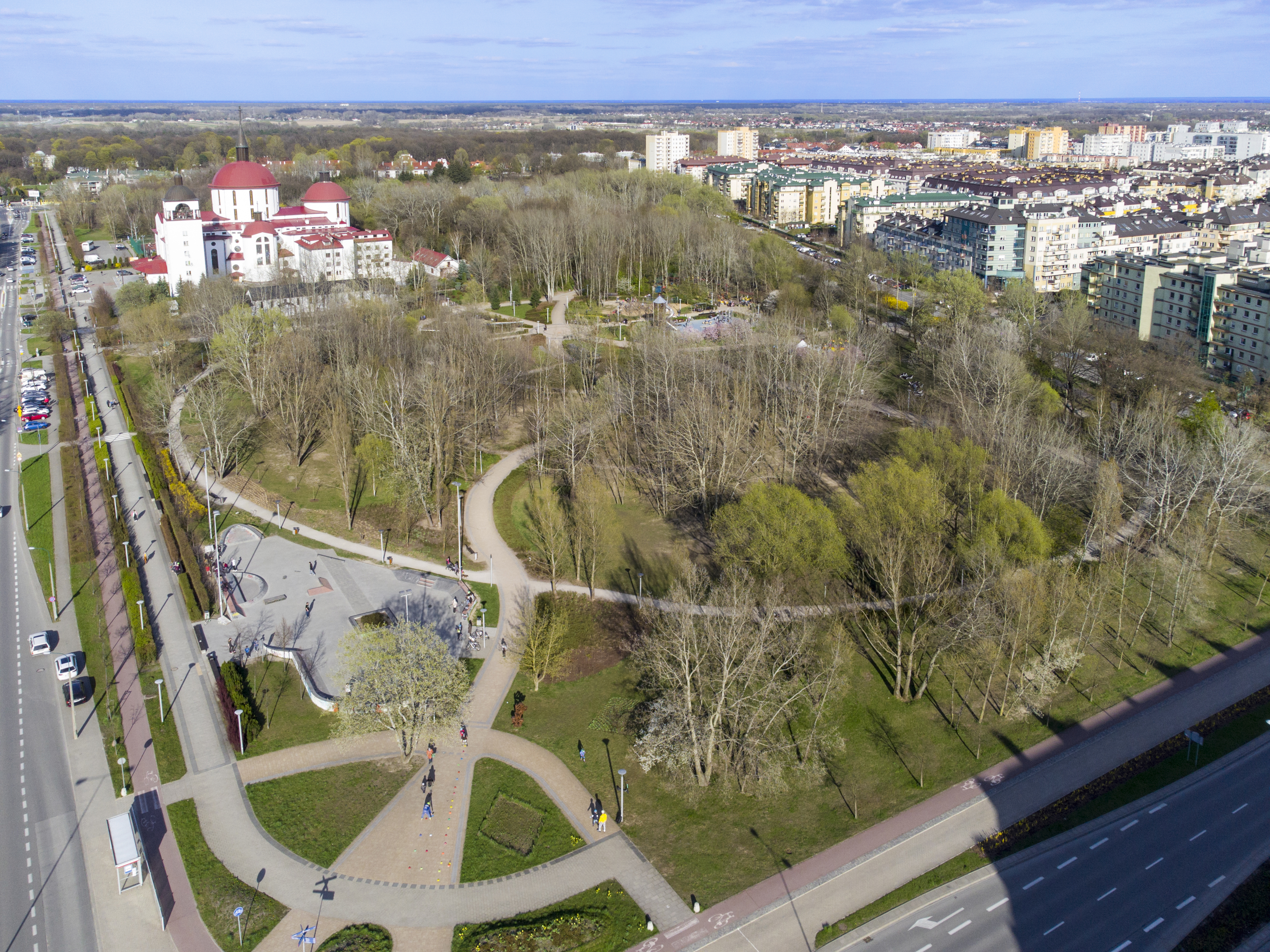
Przy Bażantarni Park in 2021.

Natolin is a residential area, dominated by high-rise apartment buildings, including the housing estates of VitaParc, Wolica, and Wyżyny. Additionally, the neighbourhood of Moczydło, predominantly consisting of low-rise single-family housing, is also present in the southwest, to the west of Stryjeńskich Street.It also has the Natolin station of the M1 line of the Warsaw Metro rapid transit underground system, placed at the intersection of Belgradzka Street and Komisji Edukacji Narodowej Avenue.

The neighbourhood includes four urban parks, this being Birch Woods Park, Moczydełko Park, Przy Bażantarni Park, and Silent Unseen Park. Additionally, right outside its boundary, next to Nowoursynowska Street, is placed the Natolin Park, which includes the 19th-century Potocki Palace built in the Neoclassical style, as well as the Natolin Woods nature reserve with the area of approximately 100 ha. In the eastern part of the neighbourhood also includes three small ponds, known as Moczydło 1, 2, and 3. Additionally, a pedunculate oak tree, named Mieszko I, grows near Nowoursynowska Street, with its age estimated at around 600 years, making it one of the oldest trees in Poland.

Natolin also has two Catholic churches, including the Blessed Ladislas of Gielniów Church at 3 Przy Bażantarni Street, and the Church of the Presentation of Jesus at 21 Stryjeńskich Street.

== Location and boundaries ==
Natolin is a City Information System area in Warsaw, Poland, located within the northeastern portion of the Ursynów district. Its boundaries are approximately determined to the north by Płaskowickiej Street, and Branickiego Street; to the east by the Warsaw Escarpment, Nowoursynowska Street, and Rosoła Street; to the south by Jeżewskiego Street, Komisji Edukacji Narodowej Avenue, Przy Bażantarni Street, Stryjeńskich Street, Wełniana Street, Ustronie Street; and to the west by Kabaty Woods, a branch line of the Warsaw Metro, Żołny Street, including following its for former fragment, previously leading to the intersection with Płaskowickiej Street.

Natolin borders Stary Imielin, and Ursynów-Centrum to the north, Błonia Wilanowskie to the east, Kabaty to the south, and Kabaty Woods Nature Reserve, and Pyry to the west. Its eastern boundary forms the border between Ursynów and Wilanów.
