= Belgradzka Street, Warsaw =

Street in Warsaw, Poland

Coordinates: 52.1401°N 21.0586°E

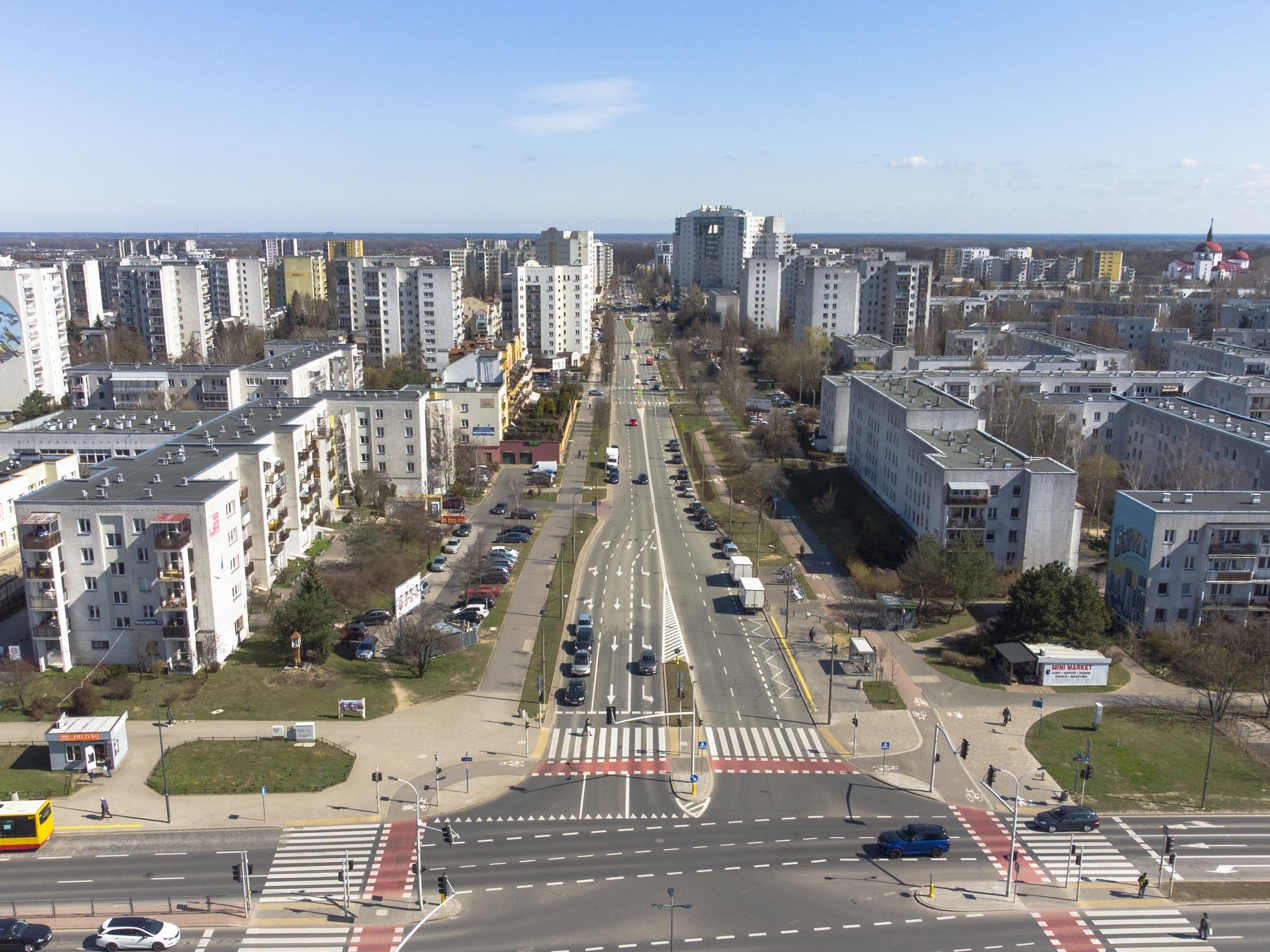
View from the junction with Stryjeńskich Street towards the east

Belgradzka Street (Polish: Ulica Belgradzka; lit. Belgrade Street) is a street in Warsaw, in the district of Ursynów, running through the neighbourhood of Natolin, between Nowoursynowska and Stryjeńskich Streets.

== Location and characteristics ==
Belgradzka Street runs through the Ursynów district of Warsaw, within the City Information System area of Natolin. It begins at Nowoursynowska Street and ends a little over 100 metres past the intersection with Stryjeńskich Street. Its general direction is east–west. It runs through the neighborhoods of Wyżyny and Wolica, and forms the northwestern boundary of the Dębina estate. The section from Jana Rosoła Street to Stryjeńskich has the status of a county road (road no. 5606W). Its actual length is approximately 1.6 km. Additionally, the name "Belgradzka Street" formally applies to a potential extension westward towards Pileckiego Street.

The name of the street was assigned in 1978 by a resolution of the National Council of the Capital City of Warsaw for the section between Rosoła and Pileckiego Streets. It is derived from Belgrade, then the capital of Yugoslavia. In 1990, the Mokotów District Council extended the official street designation to include the section between Rosoła and Nowoursynowska Streets. Some historical maps labeled the planned section from Stryjeńskich towards Pileckiego (then Paweł Finder Street) as "Welwetowa". In 2018, only a 150-metre fragment of this planned extension was built, serving as an access road to a center for people with disabilities. According to the 2018 land use and development plan for Warsaw, the remaining area is designated for park greenery.

Belgradzka Street connects the Park of the Silent Unseen Paratroopers of the Home Army with Natolin Park. Along the street are located: the Presentation of the Lord Church in Warsaw, Natolin Gallery, and the Natolin metro station on the M1 line.
