= Ladislas of Gielniów =

Polish Roman Catholic priest (c. 1440–1505)

Blessed Ladislas of Gielniów O.F.M. Cap.
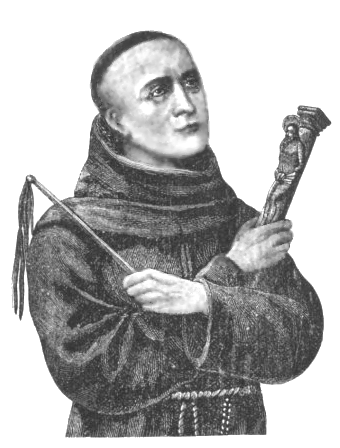

Priest
- Born: c. 1440; Gielniów, Kingdom of Poland
- Died: 4 May 1505 (aged 65); Warsaw, Kingdom of Poland
- Resting place: Gniezno, Poland
- Venerated in: Roman Catholic Church
- Beatified: 11 February 1750, Saint Peter's Basilica, Papal States by Pope Benedict XIV
- Feast: 4 May; 25 September (Poland)
- Attributes: Capuchin habit; Crucifix; Statue; Whip
- Patronage: Lithuania; Poland; Galicia; Warsaw

Blessed Ladislas of Gielniów (c. 1440 – 4 May 1505) was a Polish Roman Catholic priest and a professed member of the Order of Friars Minor. He was an observant of the Rule of Saint Francis of Assisi and served his order in various capacities that included both a doorkeeper and as its provincial. He also travelled across Poland to evangelize to the faithful and was a noted preacher.

Pope Benedict XIV beatified him on 11 February 1750. Since his beatification he was appointed as the patron of various places such as Warsaw (1962) and Galicia.

== Life ==
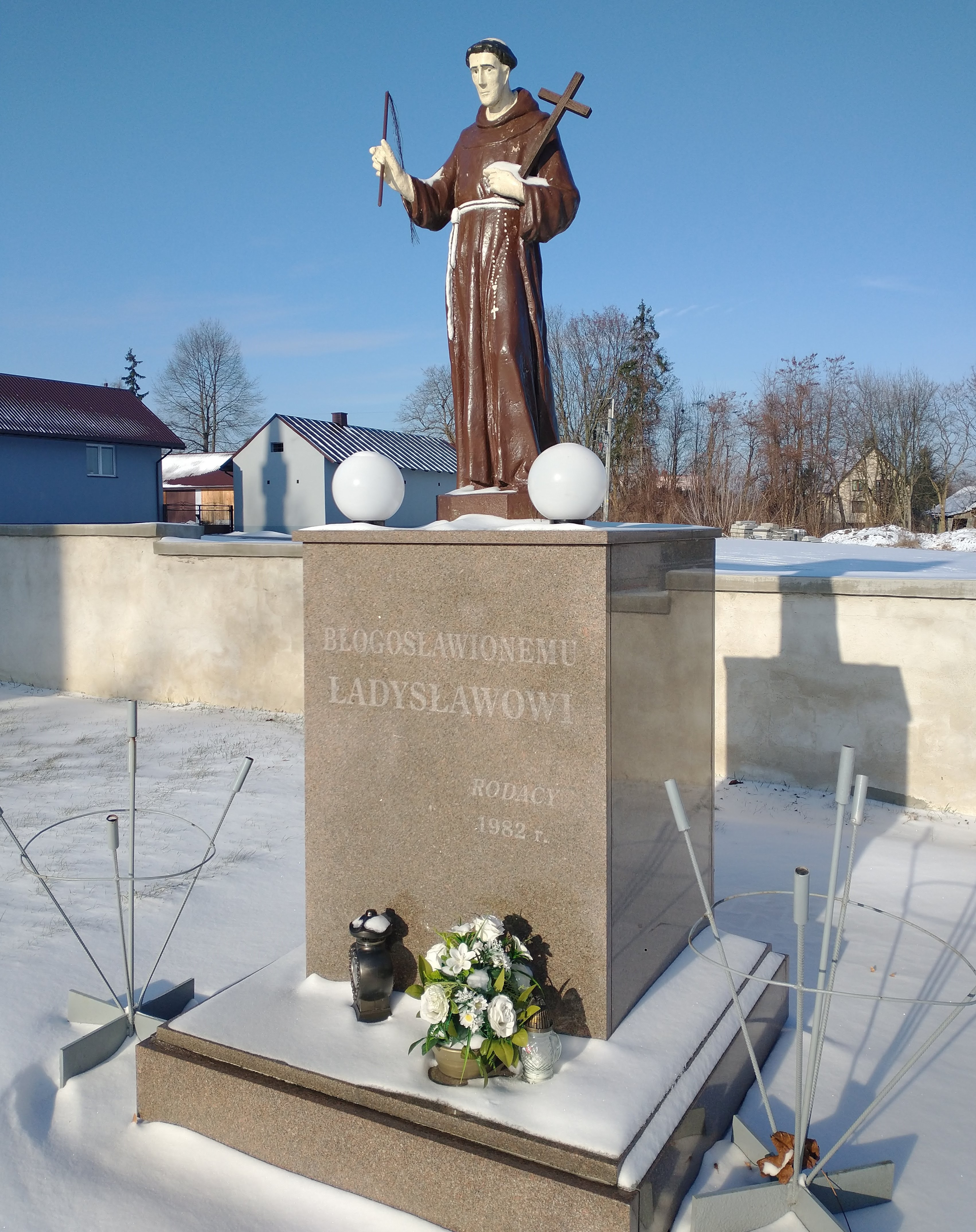
Statue in Gielniów

Ladislas of Gielniów was born in Poland in 1440 in Gielniów. Upon his baptism he received the names of "Marcin Jan".

He graduated from his parish school in 1462 and received his education from the institute in Warsaw before he could be admitted into the Order of Friars Minor at the urging of his parents. But he also studied in Kraków before entering the order. Ladislas realized that his true calling in life was to forsake the secular world and to serve God to the fullest. He entered the Franciscan convent in 1464 in Warsaw; upon his solemn profession into the order he was made the doorkeeper of the convent he lived in. He was later ordained to the priesthood and received permission to go among the Kalmuks in Russia to preach the message of the Gospel; he met obstacles and was forced to return home with limited success.

He was chosen as the order's Provincial in 1487 (until 1490) and was elected again in 1496 (until 1499); he was elected on three other occasions. He sent Franciscan missionaries to Lithuania to great success for their work bought schismatic back into the Church. Ladislas also travelled across the nation in an effort to evangelize to the faithful and in 1498 led a campaign of reflection to protect Poland from Tatars and the Turks. The raging winter storm stopped the invaders and allowed the Poles to push them off. He participated in the general chapters of the Franciscans at both Urbino in 1490 and in Milan in 1498. Ladislas was a noted preacher during his travels and was well known for his constant spirit of penance in which he often fasted and wore a hair net. He had an ardent devotion to the Passion of Jesus Christ. From 1504 to his death he was the superior of a convent in his hometown.

On Good Friday in 1505 while he was reflecting he levitated into the air. When he returned to the ground he collapsed and was confined to his bed. He remained bed-ridden until his death on 4 May 1505 a few weeks later.

== Beatification ==
He received beatification from Pope Benedict XIV on 11 February 1750 after the pontiff acknowledged the late friar's widespread cultus (devotion) across Poland.

== See also ==
- List of churches named after Blessed Ladislas of Gielniów
