= Blessed Ladislas of Gielniów Church, Warsaw =

Blessed Ladislas of Gielniów Church
- Kościół bł. Władysława z Gielniowa
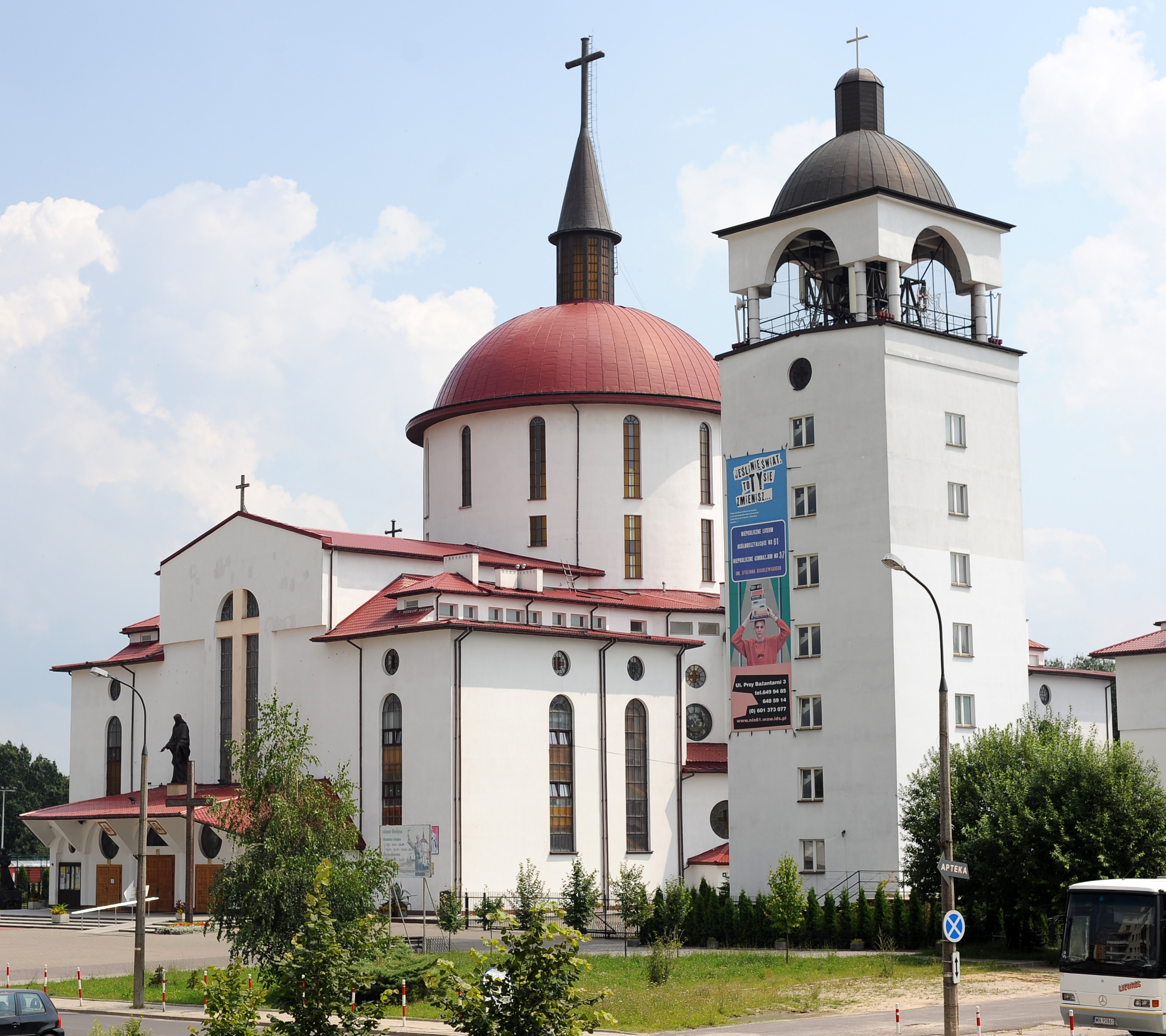
- Blessed Ladislas of Gielniów Church
- Blessed Ladislas of Gielniów Church
- 52°08′13.31″N 21°03′53.75″E
- Address: Przy Bażantarni 3, Warsaw
- Country: Poland
- Denomination: Roman Catholic
- Website: blwlad.mkw.pl

History
- Status: Parish church
- Founded: 1992
- Founder: Canon Eugeniusz Ledwoch
- Dedication: Blessed Ladislas of Gielniów
- Consecrated: 17 December 2000

Architecture
- Architectural type: Basilica
- Groundbreaking: 1992

Administration
- Archdiocese: Warsaw
- Parish: Blessed Ladislas of Gielniów Parish

The Blessed Ladislas of Gielniów Church (Polish: Kościół bł. Władysława z Gielniowa) is a Catholic parish church located in the Ursynów district of Warsaw, Poland, in the neighbourhood of Natolin, at 3 Przy Bażantarni Street. It is dedicated to Blessed Ladislas of Gielniów.

== History ==
The church was built under the supervision of the parish priest, Canon Eugeniusz Ledwoch (who died in April 2002), the organizer and first pastor of the parish. The construction of the foundations began in 1992. In October 1993, Cardinal Józef Glemp, the Archbishop of Warsaw and Primate of Poland, laid the cornerstone, which came from the remnants of St. Catherine's Church in Służew. The church was consecrated on 17 December 2000, also by Cardinal Józef Glemp.

== Architecture and interior ==
The building is a three-aisled church built on the plan of a Latin cross. It is crowned with four domes: one above the transept, one above the presbytery, and one over each of the side chapels.

Next to the church stands a 19-meter-tall freestanding bell tower. It houses the bell Ladislas (Polish: Władysław) crafted by Witold Sobol and Waldemar Olszewski at the Jan Felczyński Bell Foundry in Przemyśl. Along with the clapper and suspension, it weighs about 11 tons. The bell has a diameter of 2.33 meters and a height of about 2.21 meters.

The pipe organ was built by Dariusz Zych in 2008. In the immediate vicinity of the church is the Przy Bażantarni Park.

== Pastors of the parish church ==
- Canon Eugeniusz Ledwoch (1985–2002), builder of the church, died in 2002
- Prelate Jacek Kozub (2002–2024)
- Canon Robert Zalewski (2024–)
