= Birch Woods Park =

Urban park in Warsaw, Poland

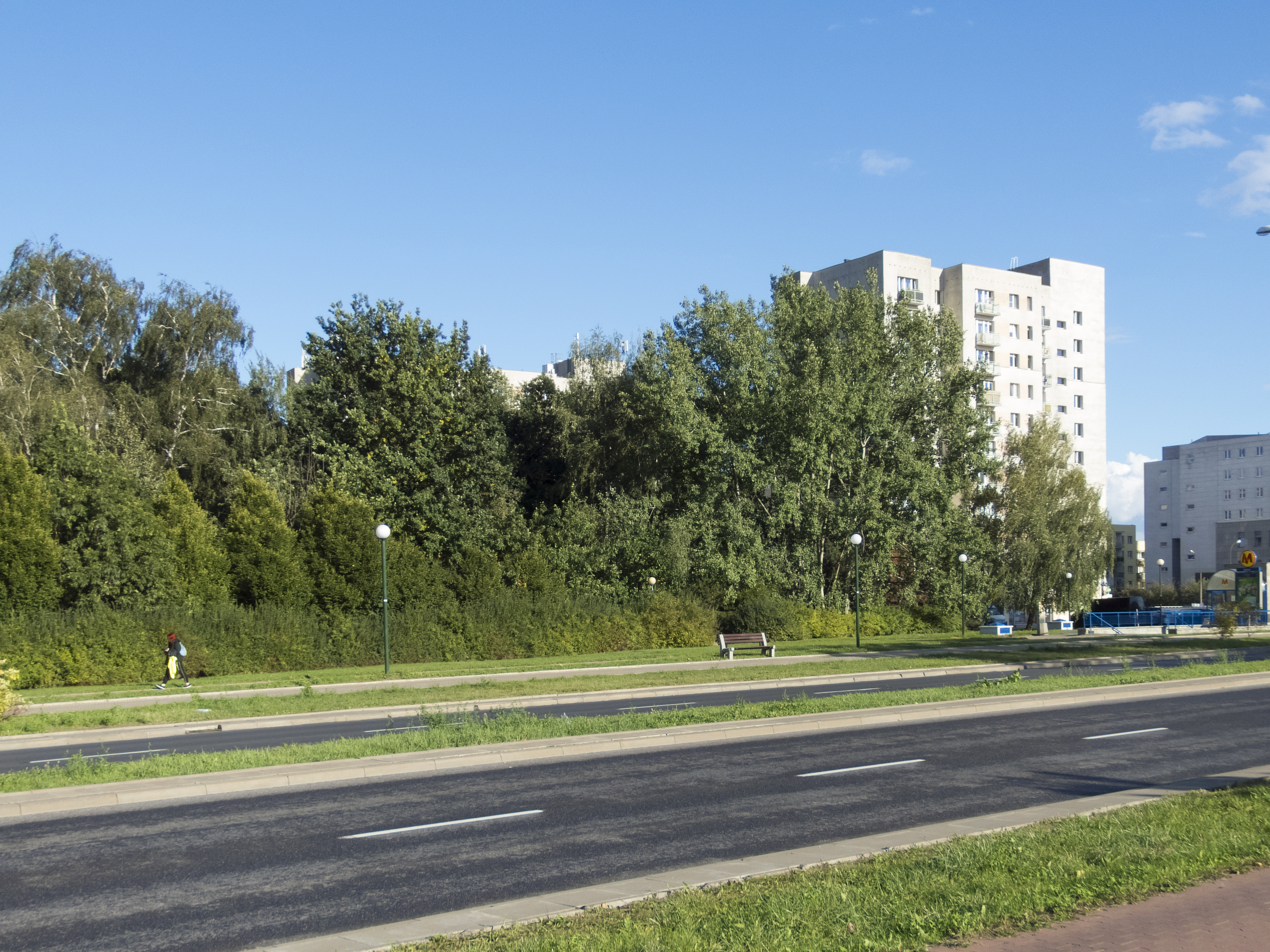
- The park as seen from Komisji Edukacji Narodowej Avenue.
- Interactive map of Birch Woods Park
- Type: Urban park, urban forest
- Location: Ursynów, Warsaw, Poland
- Coordinates: 52°08′30″N 21°03′29″E
- Area: 3.64 hectares (9.0 acres)
- Created: 2010

The Birch Woods Park (Polish: Park Lasek Brzozowy) is an urban park and forest in the city of Warsaw, Poland, within the district of Ursynów. It is located in the neighbourhood of Natolin, between Komisji Edukacji Narodowej Avenue, Belgradzka Street, and Lanciego Street. It has a total area of 3.64 ha (8.99 acres), and is divided into two parts. Its western smaller portion consists of a recreational park area, with a football pitch and playgrounds. The eastern larger part constitutes a small forested area known as the Birch Woods (Polish: Lasek Brzozowy). The area was developed into an urban park in 2010.

== History ==
By the 1970s, a dirt road crossed the area of the current park, connecting Komisji Edukacji Narodowej Avenue and Lanciego Street. As the local government anticipated that it would eventually be developed into a paved street, in 1977, it was named in commemoration of Henryk Świątkowski, a lawyer who was the Minister of Justice of Poland from 1945 to 1956. While it was never constructed, the name remained listed in the municipal records until 2013. Today, it remains as a footpath crossing through the middle of the park.

In 2008, a plan to revitalise the park area was approved. In 2010, pathways and a playground were constructed in the park, and in 2014, a football pitch was also added.

In 2015, the St. Sophia Church of Holy Wisdom, a Polish Autocephalous Orthodox Church temple and the largest Orthodox Christian church in Poland, was planned to be constructed replacing the park. Following the protests of the local residents, the planned location was changed, and the building was constructed at 568 Puławska Street in the neighbourhood of Jeziorki instead.

== Characteristics ==
The park is located between Komisji Edukacji Narodowej Avenue, Belgradzka Street, and Lanciego Street, and is divided into two areas. Its western smaller portion consists of a recreational park area, with a football pitch and playgrounds. The eastern larger part constitutes a small forested area known as the Birch Woods (Polish: Lasek Brzozowy), which is administered by the Warsaw Municipal Forestry. Despite the name, birch trees only make up a small minority of tree species in the forest. The park has a total area of 3.64 ha (8.99 acres).
