= Gielniów =

- Town
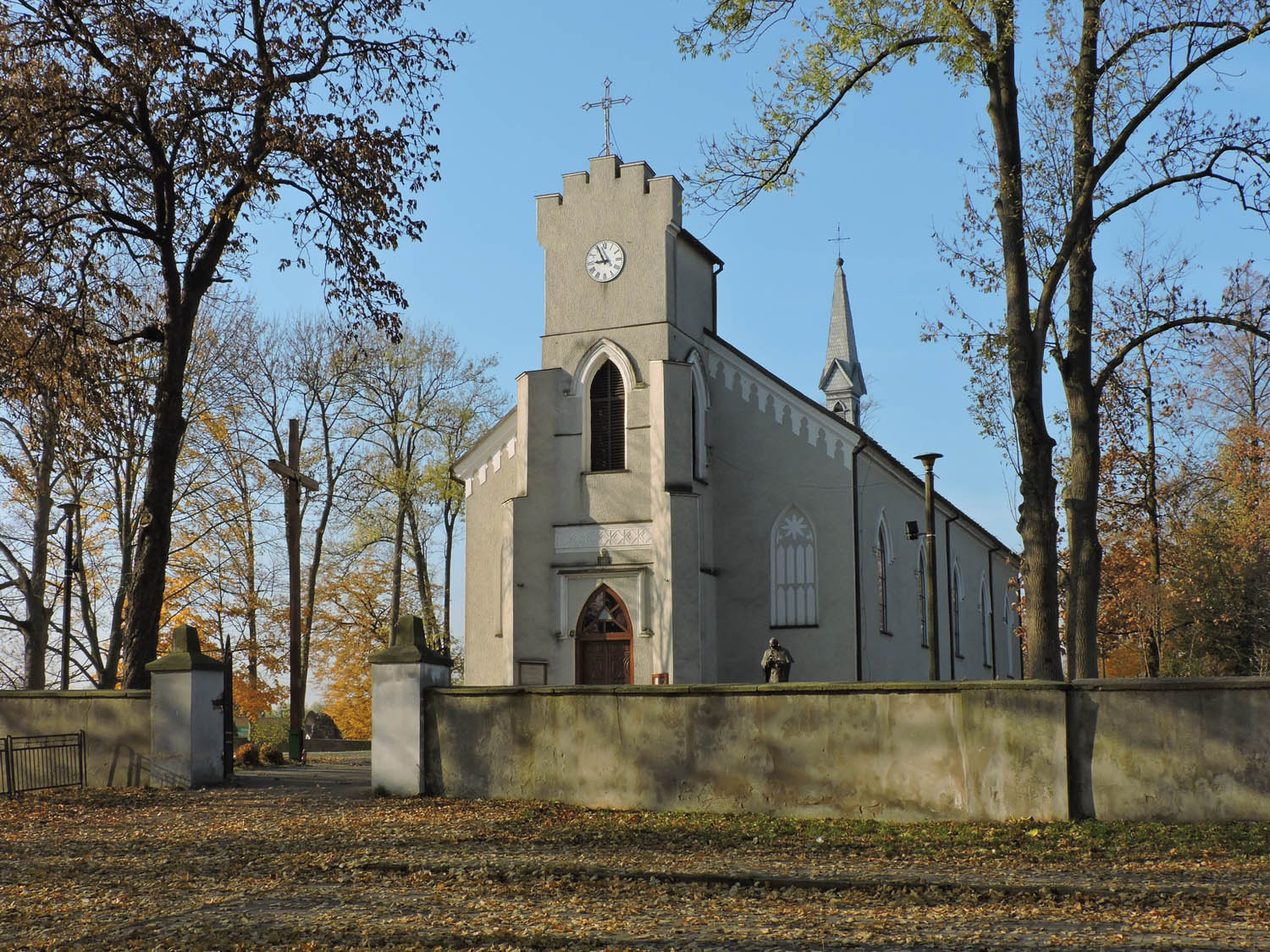
- Ladislaus of Gielniów church

- Coat of arms

- Location within Poland
- Coordinates: 51°23′N 20°29′E
- Country: Poland
- Voivodeship: Masovian
- County: Przysucha
- Gmina: Gielniów
- Town rights: 1455
- Elevation: 209 m (686 ft)

Population
  - Total: 1,100
- Time zone: UTC+1 (CET)
  - Summer (DST): UTC+2 (CEST)
- Postal code: 26-434
- Vehicle registration: WPY

Gielniów [ˈɡʲɛlɲuf] is a town in Przysucha County, Masovian Voivodeship, in east-central Poland. It is the seat of the gmina (administrative district) called Gmina Gielniów.

== History ==
Gielniów used to be a town from 1455 until either 1869 or 1870. It received Magdeburg rights due to efforts of a local nobleman Tomasz Mszczuj of Brzezinki. Until the Partitions of Poland, Gielniów belonged to Sandomierz Voivodeship in the Lesser Poland Province, but it remained a very small town, whose population was app. 100 (as for the mid-17th century). In 1815–1915, Gielniów was part of Russian-controlled Congress Poland, losing its town charter after the failed January Uprising. In the mid-19th century, its population was app. 500, and after losing the charter, Gielniów declined.

Following the German-Soviet invasion of Poland, which started World War II in September 1939, Gielniów was occupied by Germany until 1945. The local Polish police chief and another Polish policeman from Gielniów were murdered by the Russians in the Katyn massacre in 1940.

== Notable people ==
- Ladislas of Gielniów (c. 1440–1505), Polish priest and professed member of the Order of Friars Minor, Blessed of the Catholic Church
