= Natolin Palace and Park Complex =

Palace in Warsaw, Poland

Coordinates: 52°8′20″N 21°4′25″E

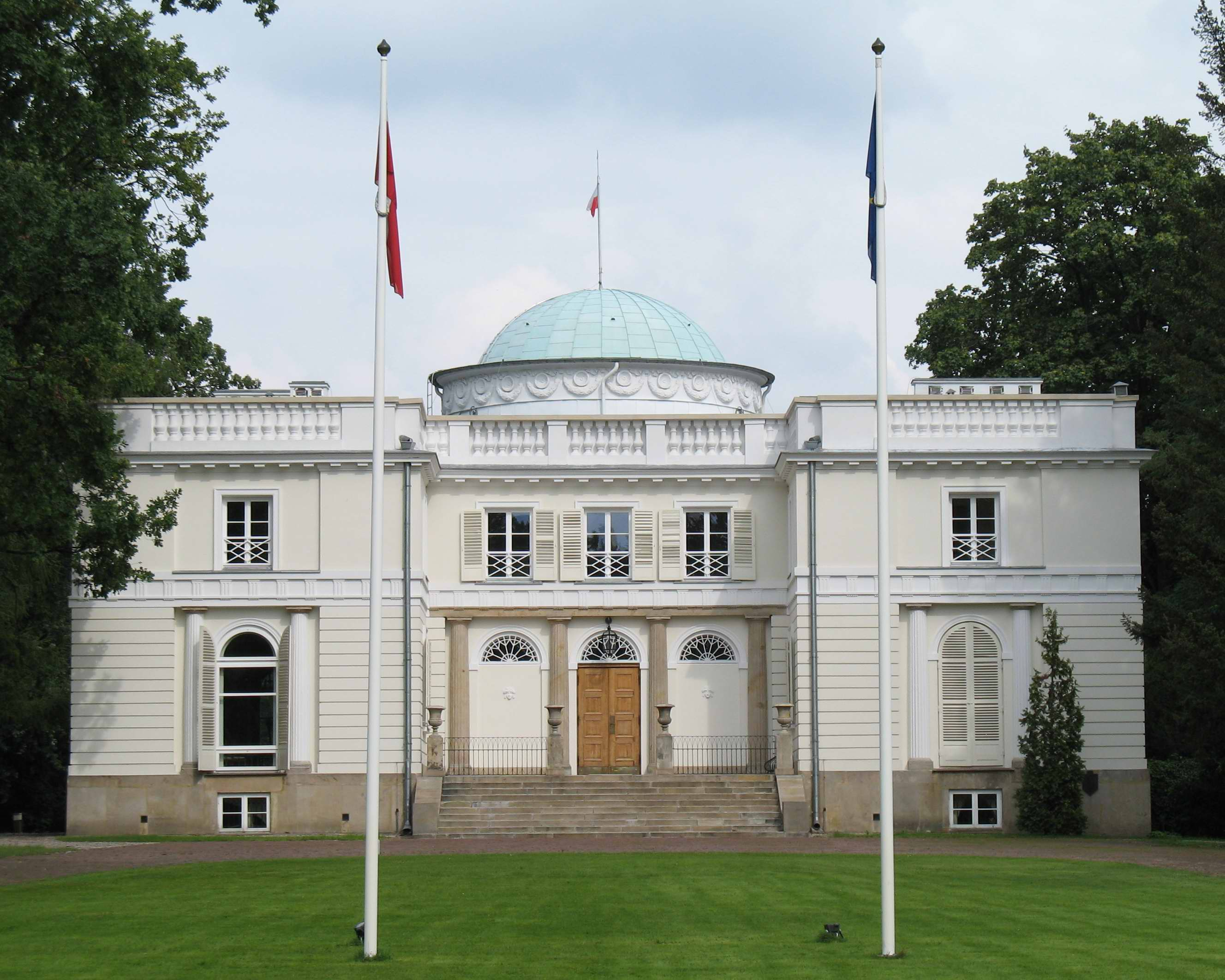
- Potocki Palace.
- Interactive map of Natolin Palace and Park Complex
- Type: Municipal
- Location: Warsaw
- Area: 105 ha
- Created: 2006
- Status: open 2 days a week

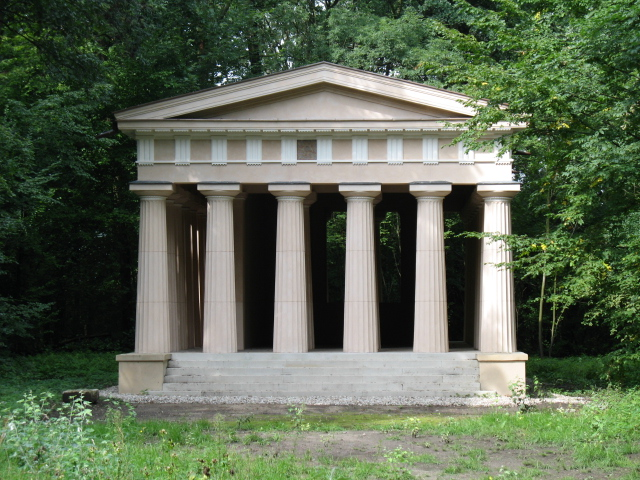
Doric Temple.

The Natolin Palace and Park Complex (Polish: Zespół pałacowo-parkowy w Natolinie), also known as the Natolin Park (Polish: Park Natoliński) is a historic park and nature reserve (1.2 km^{2}) on the southern edge of Warsaw, Poland, in the Natolin residential neighborhood. It contains the Potocki Palace.

== History ==
=== Park and palace ===
At the end of the 17th century, the King of Poland John III Sobieski started the construction of a royal zoological garden in the village of Natolin. It was a part of his royal residence of Wilanów and also served as a hunting lodge. In the early 1730s, Sobieski's successor King August II the Strong reformed the garden into a pheasant breeding and hunting area. The place was thus called Bażantarnia – Pheasantry. With time, the former royal grounds were passed to the Czartoryski family. In 1780 Prince August Czartoryski built on the spot his new summer residence. Located in dense forests on the escarpment of the Vistula River, the new classicist palace was designed by a renowned contemporary architect Szymon Bogumił Zug while the internal design was prepared by Vincenzo Brenna. The palace featured a distinctive half-open salon, with a view on the forest below the escarpment.

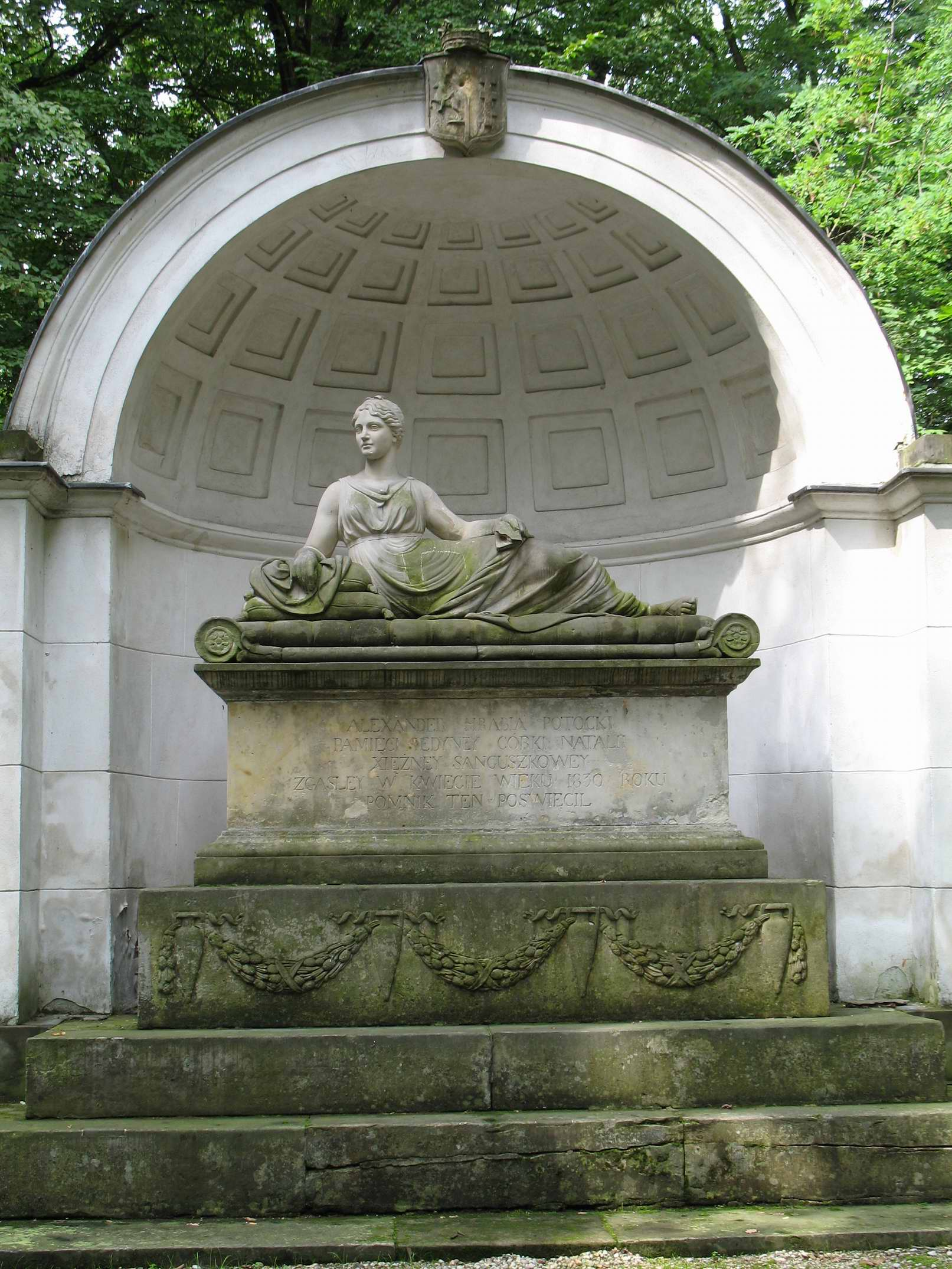
Sarcophagus and monument to Natalia Sanguszkowa, née Potocka.

In late 18th century the Wilanów estate, including the grounds around the Pheasantry, passed on to son-in-law of Izabela Lubomirska, Stanisław Kostka Potocki. After the Partitions of Poland, in 1806, Potocki started an extensive modernization of the palace and the park. The Pheasantry was also renamed to its modern name of Natolin in honor of Potocki's granddaughter, Natalia Potocka (born 1807). The palace's reconstruction included rebuilding of the facade and the courtyard elevation, as well as notable changes in the internal design and decorations. The new design was created by another of Poland's notable architects of the epoch, Chrystian Piotr Aigner, though some of the changes are attributed to Potocki himself.

The paintings inside the palace were replaced with stuccos by Wirgiliusz Bauman. Significant changes were applied to the surrounding park, which was converted from a typical classicist French park into a picturesque and then-popular landscape park. The park was also extended to include some romantic buildings and sculptures such as the Holendernia built between 1812 and 1814 by Aigner or two guard houses, modelled after medieval castles, built in 1832. The palace itself was also extended to include buildings that made it a full-time residence rather than a summer resort. Among the buildings added were the stables, a residential annex and a coach house. A small Gothic Revival chapel was also built opposite the Holendernia and a newly built monument modelled after Jean-Jacques Rousseau's tomb in Paris.

Alexander Potocki's death ended the splendid period of developments of Natolin. The next administrators of estate, son August and the daughter-in-law Alexandra did not maintain the property so Natolin began to fall into decline. The palace and park were used only occasionally, mainly as temporary accommodation for owners' relatives.

In the first half of the 20th century, Natolin passed to the Branicki family. During World War II Natolin suffered further. At time of Warsaw Uprising it underwent an almost total destruction. In 1945, Natolin was nationalized and given to the National Museum in Warsaw, later becoming the residence of President of Polish Republic. In 1991, decision was made to locate a branch of the College of Europe Natolin. As a result, funds became available to gradually restore the park and the palace. In the same year, a part of the park (nearly 1 km^{2}) was declared a nature reserve. Since 1994, it is the site of one of the two College of Europe campuses.

== See also ==
- Wilanów
- Wilanów Palace
- Łazienki Park
