= Silent Unseen Park =

Urban park in Warsaw, Poland

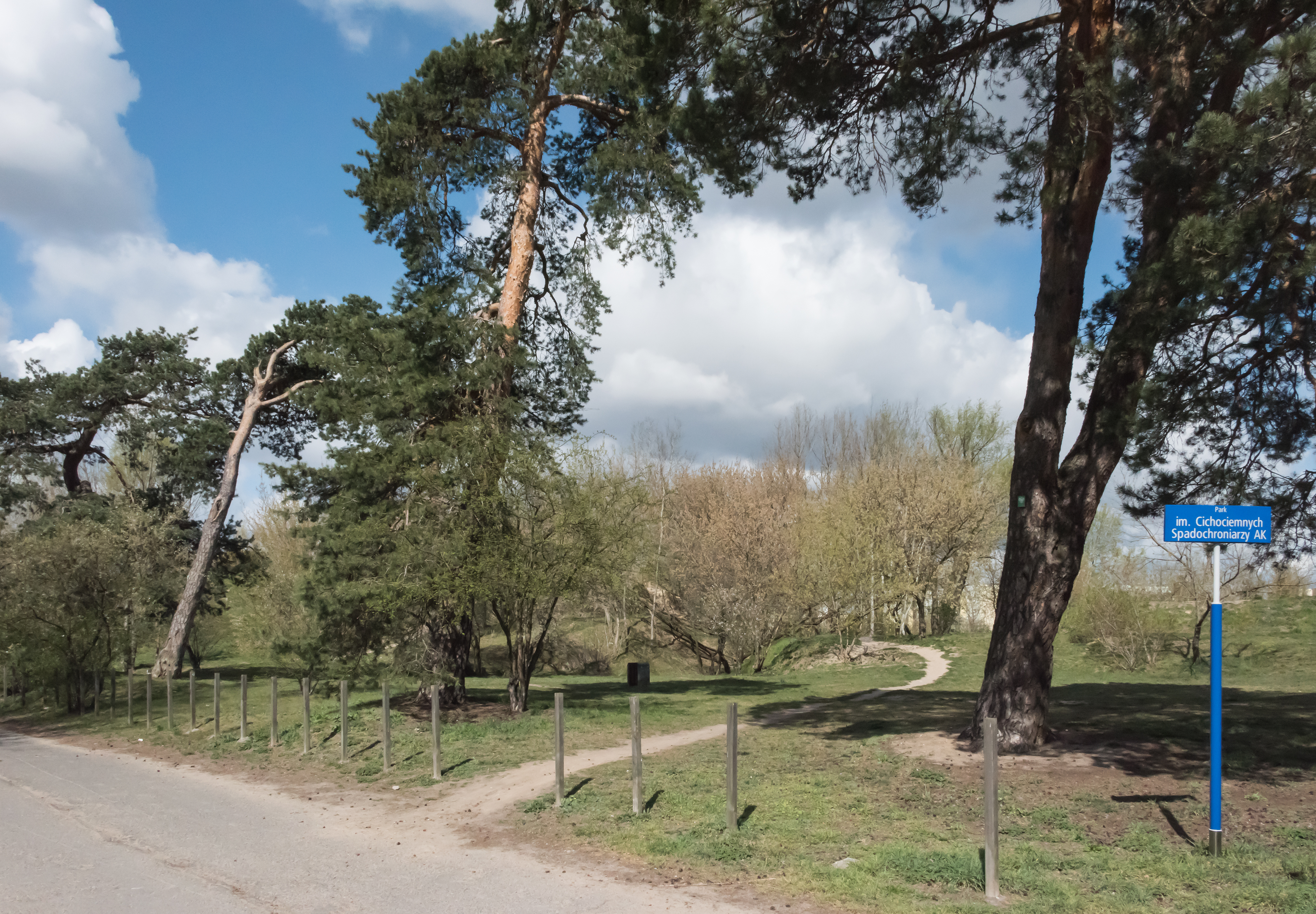
- The Silent Unseen Park in 2020.
- Interactive map of Silent Unseen Park
- Type: Urban park
- Location: Ursynów, Warsaw, Poland
- Coordinates: 52°08′17″N 21°02′12″E
- Area: 17.82 hectares (44.0 acres)
- Created: 24 May 2016

The Silent Unseen Paratroopers of the Home Army Park, (Note: Polish: Park im. Cichociemnych Spadochroniarzy AK) also simply known as the Silent Unseen Park, (Note: Polish: Park Cichociemnych) is an urban park in Warsaw, Poland. It is located in the neighbourhood of Natolin, within the district of Ursynów, between Perkalowa Street, Belgradzka Strewt, Moczydłowska Street, and Gminna Street. The park was established in 2016.

== Name ==
The park is named after the Silent Unseen, the elite special-operations paratroopers of the Home Army of Poland during the World War II.

== History ==
The park was established on 24 May 2016.

It includes the Three Peaks Hill, an artificial hill created in the 1970s. Around the year 2000, a dual slalom bike racing track was built there, with four-cross and dirt jumping track amenities also added in the following years. A beginners track, and a pump track in 2015 and 2018 respectively. The mound hosted numerous mountain bike racing events.

== Characteristics ==
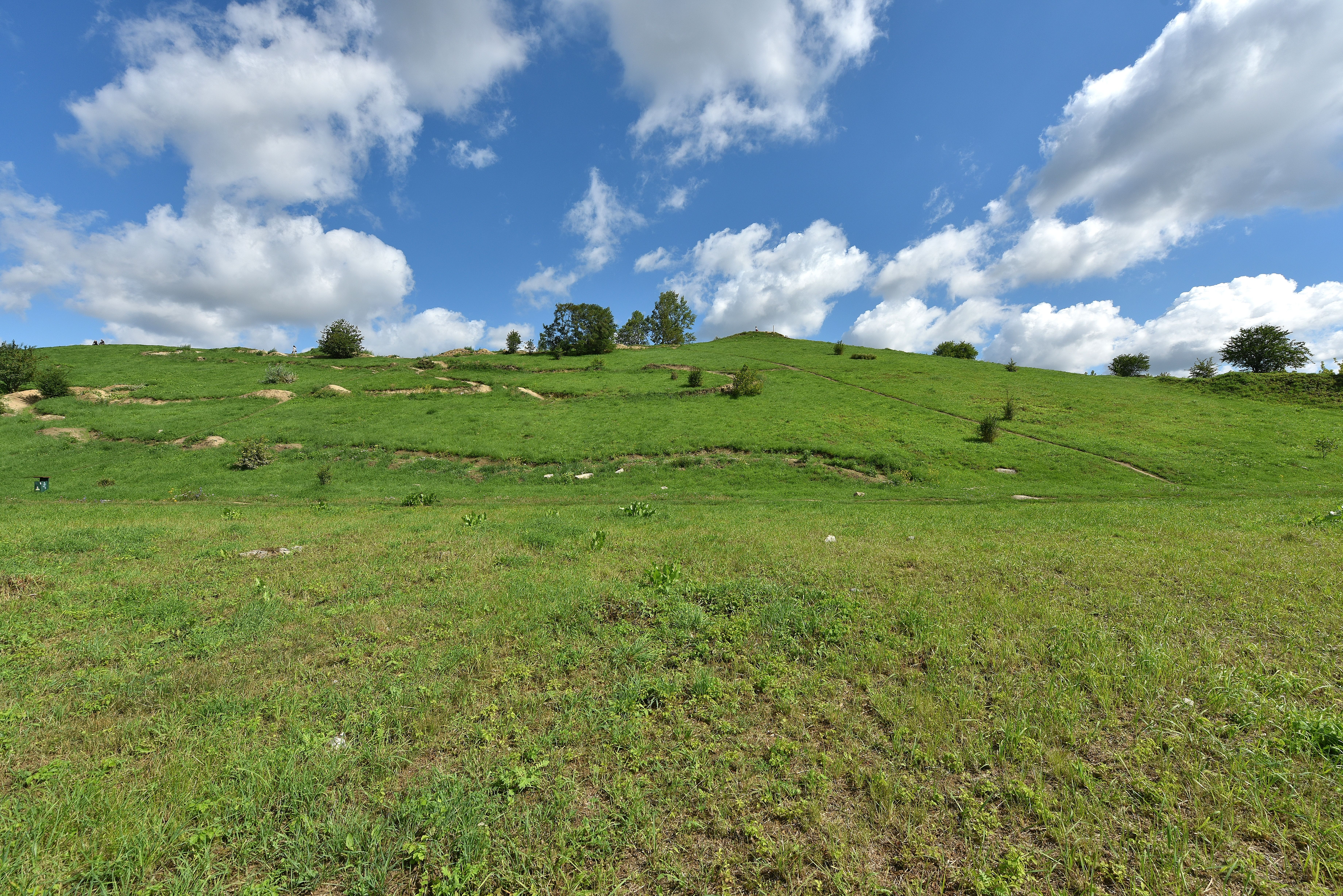
The Three Peaks Hill in the Silent Unseen Park in 2016.

The park is located in the neighbourhood of Natolin, within the district of Ursynów, between Perkalowa Street, Belgradzka Strewt, Moczydłowska Street, and Gminna Street. It has the total area of around 17.82 ha.

The park includes the Three Peaks Hill, an artificial hill with the peak height of 133.9 m. It includes numerous mountain bike racing tracks for dual slalom, four-cross, dirt jumping, and pump track. There are organised numerous mountain bike racing events

In the park, near Gminna Street are located two Scots pines, that have the statues of the natural monuments.

It is also the location of the annual history picnic dedicated to the Silent Unseen soldiers.
