= Natolin metro station =

Warsaw metro station

Natolin
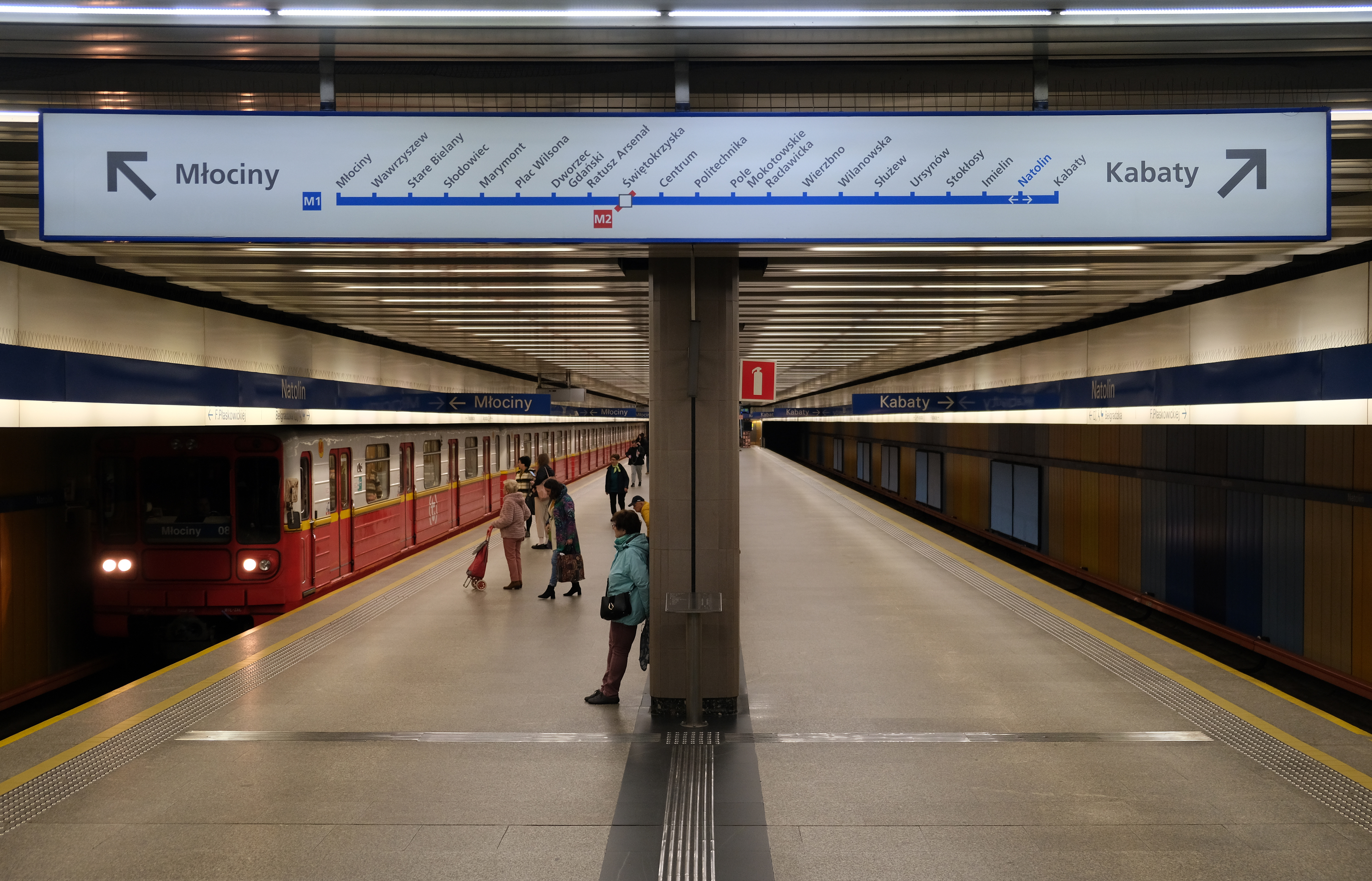

General information
- Coordinates: 52°8′27″N 21°3′23″E
- Owner: Public Transport Authority
- Platforms: 1 island platform
- Tracks: 2
- Connections: 166, 179, 192, 504

Construction
- Structure type: Underground
- Platform levels: 1
- Accessible: Yes

Other information
- Station code: A-2
- Fare zone: 1

History
- Opened: 7 April 1995; 31 years ago

Services
Preceding station	Warsaw Metro	Following station
Imielin towards Młociny	M1 line	Kabaty Terminus
Location
- Location within Warsaw

Metro Natolin is a station on Line M1 of the Warsaw Metro, located in the Natolin neighbourhood of the Ursynów district in the south of Warsaw at the junction of Aleja KEN and Belgradzka. It is near Galeria Ursynów, a small local shopping centre and a local shopping street.

The station was opened on 7 April 1995 as part of the inaugural stretch of the Warsaw Metro, between Kabaty and Politechnika.
