= Kabaty =

Neighbourhood in Warsaw, Poland

- City Information System area (neighbourhood)
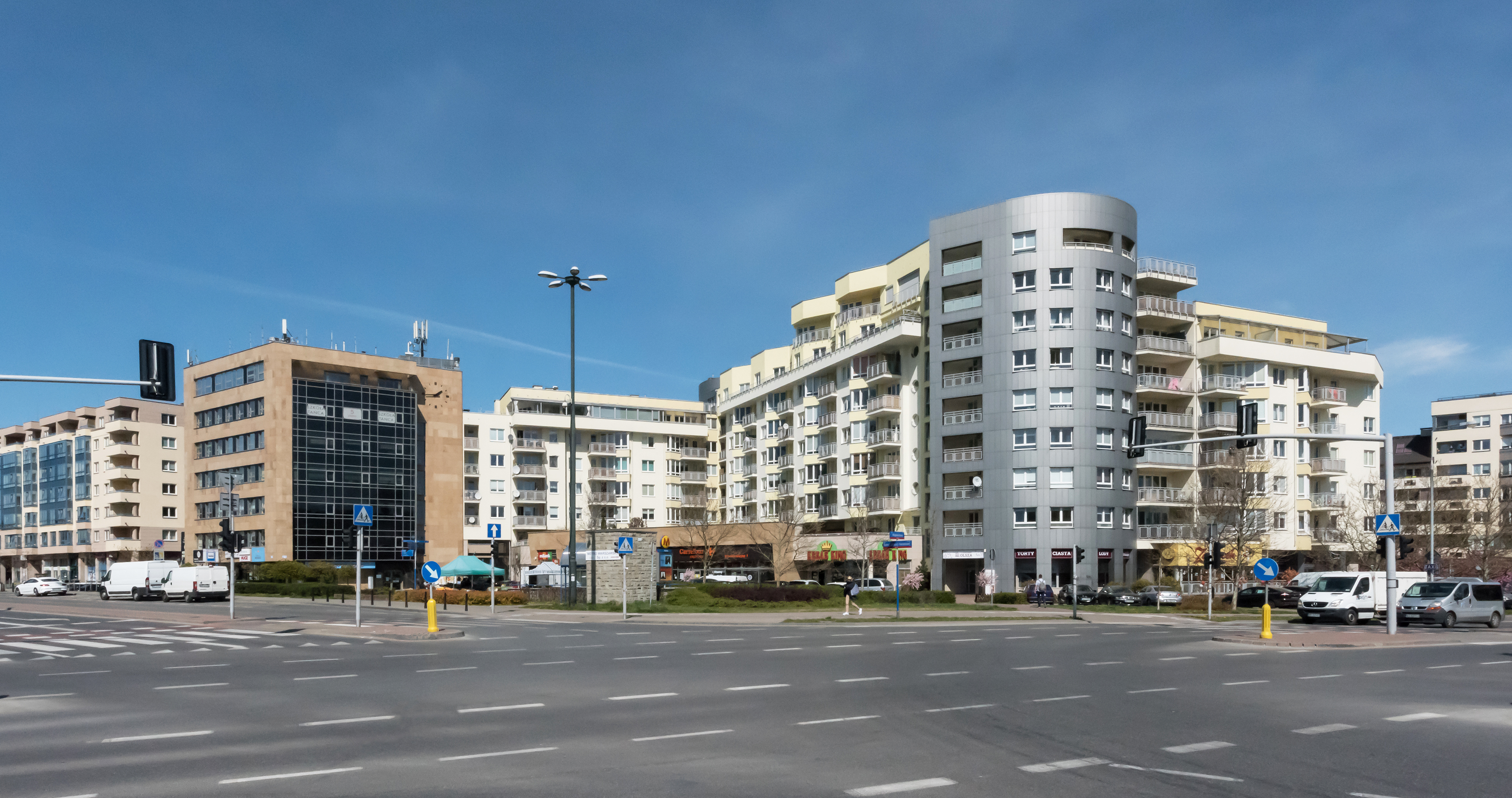
- The apartment buildings at the intersection of Komisji Edukacji Narodowej Avenue and Wąwozowa Street.

- Kabaty within the Ursynów district.
- Coordinates: 52°07′58″N 21°04′06″E
- Country: Poland
- Voivodeship: Masovian
- City and county: Warsaw
- District: Ursynów

Population (2024)
  - Total: c. 30,000
- Time zone: UTC+1 (CET)
  - Summer (DST): UTC+2 (CEST)
- Area code: +48 22

Kabaty (Polish: [kaˈba.tɘ̟]) is a neighbourhood, and a City Information System area, in Warsaw, Poland, within the Ursynów district. It is a predominantly high-rise residential area with housing eststes of apartment buildings, with a smaller presence of single-family housing, including Moczydło in the northwest, and Stare Kabaty in the east. In 2024, it had around 30,000 residents. The neighbourhood includes the Kabaty station of the M1 line of Warsaw Metro rapid transit underground system.

The oldest known records of Kabady come from 1386, when it was a small farming community. By 1527, the village of Moczydło was also present to the west. The area was incorporated into Warsaw in 1951. In the 1980s, and continuing to the 2000s, numerous housing estates were developed within the area. In 1995, the Kabaty station opened within the neighbourhood.

== Toponomy ==
The name Kabaty comes from the Polish surname Kabat, which itself comes from Polish word kabat, an archaic term for a short coat. The neighbourhood is also a namesake of the nearby Kabaty Woods, the largest nature reserve within Warsaw.

== History ==
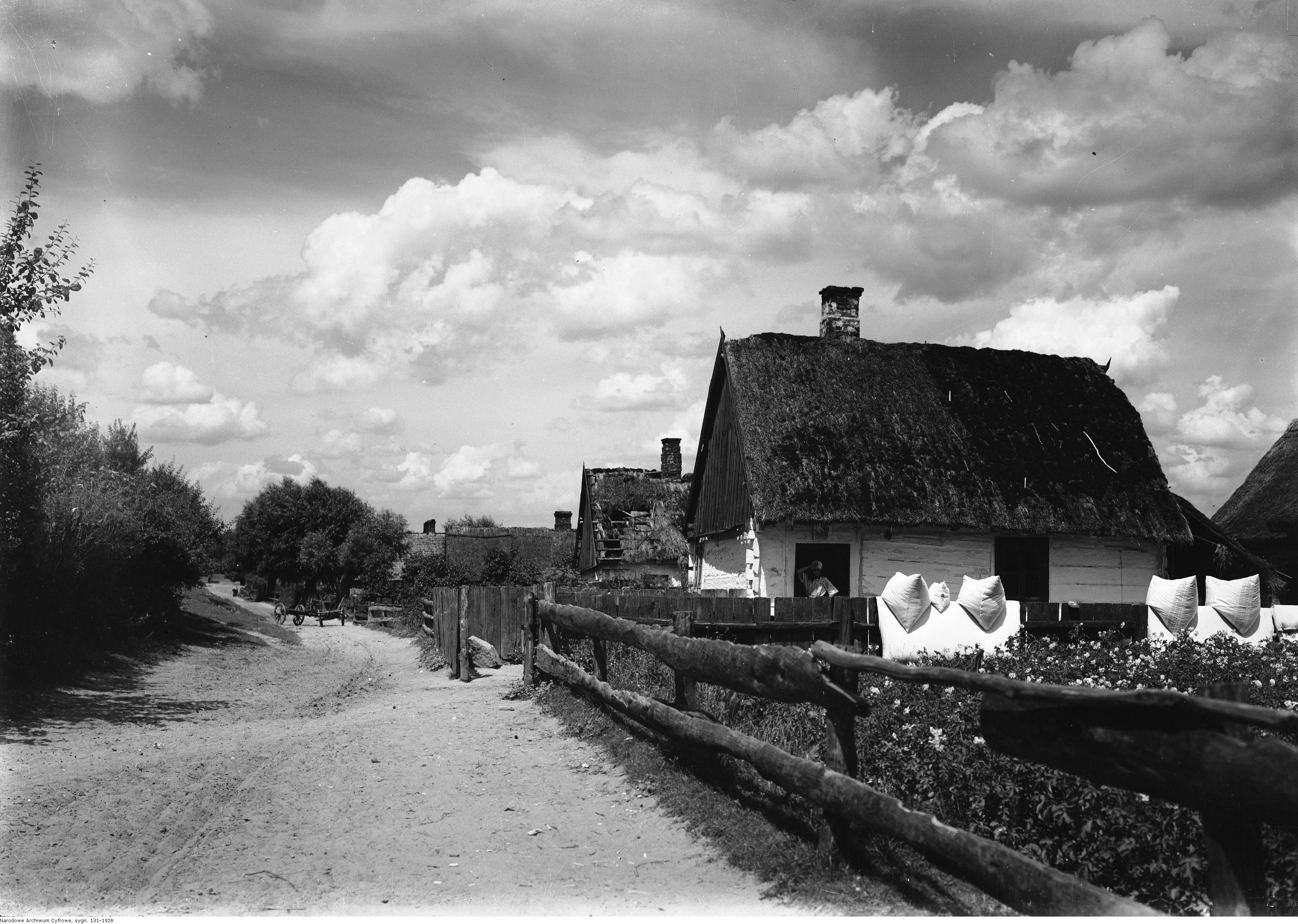
The village of Kabaty in 1926.

The oldest known records of Kabady come from 1386, when it received Kulm law privileges from duke Janusz I the Old, ruler of the Duchy of Warsaw. It was a small farming community, located at the edge of the Warsaw Escarpment, and on a road connecting Warsaw and Czersk. The village was owned by the Ciołek family until 17th century, when it was acquired by the Piekarski family.

By 1528, the village of Moczydło was also present to its west, on a road leading to Imielin. The village was owned and inhabited by a petty nobility. Between 1580 and 1658, it and its adjusted farmlands had an area of approximately 9 hectares, and in 1661, it had 5 houses.

In 1580, Kabaty and their adjusted farmlands had combined area of around 70 ha. In 1656, it was completely destroyed by the Swedish army during the Second Northern War.

In 1721, Kabaty was sold to noblewoman and landowner Elżbieta Sieniawska, who incorporated it into the Wilanów Estate. She also acquired Moczydeło, and in 1726, she ordered the protection of the nearby Kabaty Woods from deforestation. As such, wood needed for construction in Kabaty was imported from Sieniawska's estate in Nieporęt.

In 1775, Kabaty had 16 houses, and in 1827, it had a population of 177 people in 17 houses. Between 1850 and 1861, the populations of Kabaty and Moczydło fought in court to lower the costs of their feudal duties. Following the abolition of serfdom in 1864, Kabaty was incorporated into the municipality of Wilanów. In 1892, the village was bought by Ksawery Branicki, who then established there a local woods administration.

In 1905, the village was inhabited by 319 people in 38 houses, and in 1920, by 397 people in 59 houses. During the interwar period, a holiday village was established in the nearby Kabaty Woods, featuring 8 houses and the population of 61 people. On 31 December 1938, the city of Warsaw bought the Kabaty Woods, and dedicated its portion for an urban development. On 11 August 1980, it was given the status of the nature reserve. Kabaty was incorporated into the city of Warsaw on 14 May 1951.

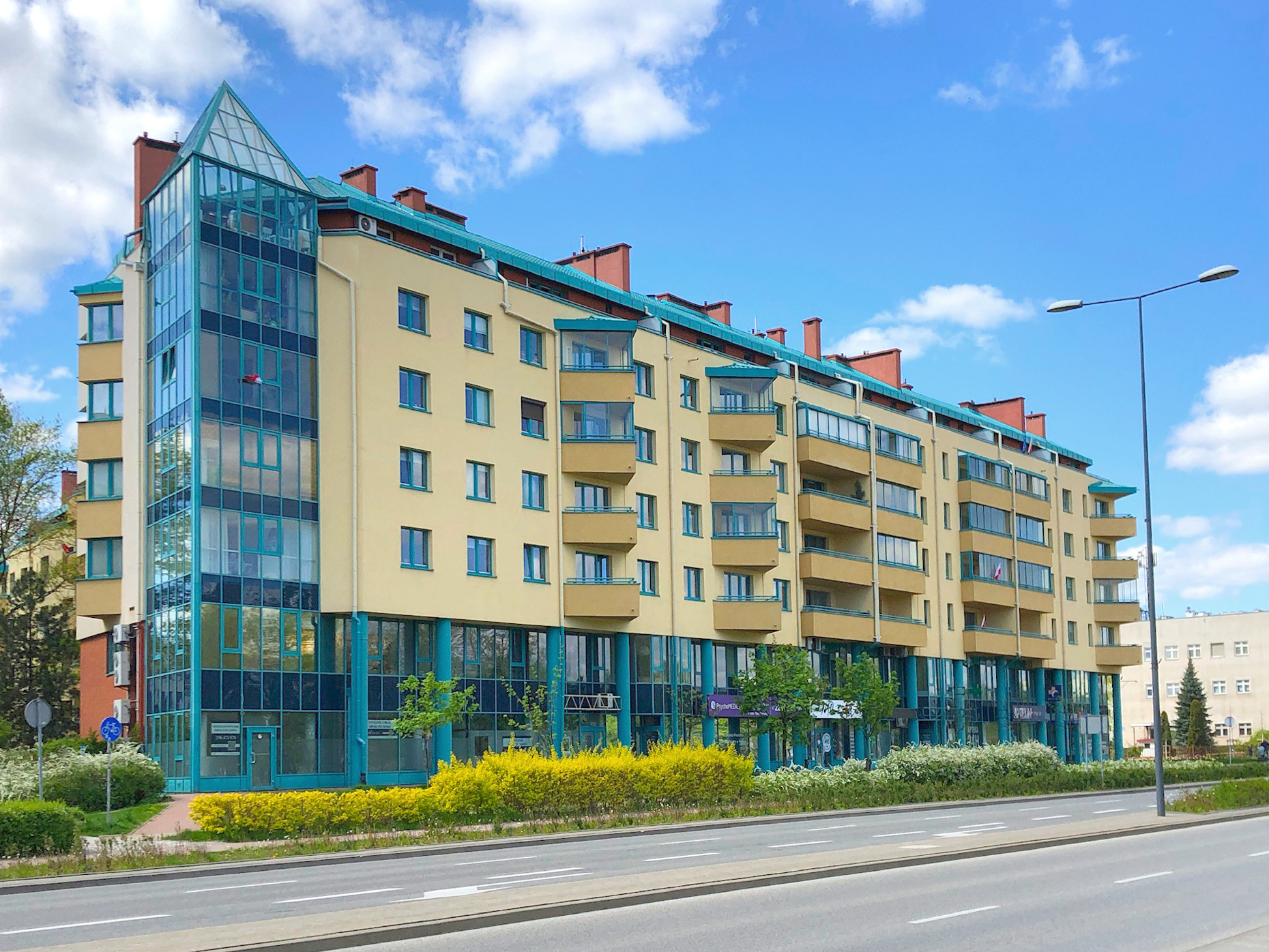
The postmodern residential buildings at 11 Przy Bażantarni Street, constructed in 2000.

Between 1987 and 1990, the housing estate of Kabaty, was developed between Jeżewskiego, Rosoła Street, Wąwozowa, Bronikowskiego, Kiepury, and Dembego Streets. Designed Jacek Jan Nowicki, as part of the urban development of Natolin, the neighbourhood consisted of apartment buildings, built in the large panel system technique. It was further expanded to the west between 1997 and 2002, within an area contained between Jeżewskiego, Kiepury, Bronikowskiego, Wąwozowa, and Wańkowicza Streets. Beginning in the 1980s, and continuing throughout the 1990s and 2000s, the area of Kabaty experienced a large development of housing estates with apartment buildings. In 1995, the Kabaty station of the M1 line of Warsaw Metro rapid transit underground system, was opened at the intersection of Komisji Edukacji Narodowej Avenue and Wąwozowa Street. To the south, next to the Kabaty Woods was also opened the Kabaty Technical and Storage Station, a motive power depot for the metro system.

In 1998, the district of Ursynów was subdivided into the areas of the City Information System, with Kabaty becoming one of them. The area additionally included portion of the neighbourhood of Moczydło.

Between 1998 and 2000, three postmodern apartment buildings were built at 11 and 13 Przy Bażantarni Street, forming the Przy SGGW Housing Association Neighbourhood. Between 2006 and 2017, the St. Padre Pio. Church was built at 25 Rybałtów Street, belonging to the Catholic denomination. In 2017, Rosnowskiego and Korbońskiego Streets were built, connecting Kabaty, and Ursynów at large, with the Wilanów district.

== Characteristics ==
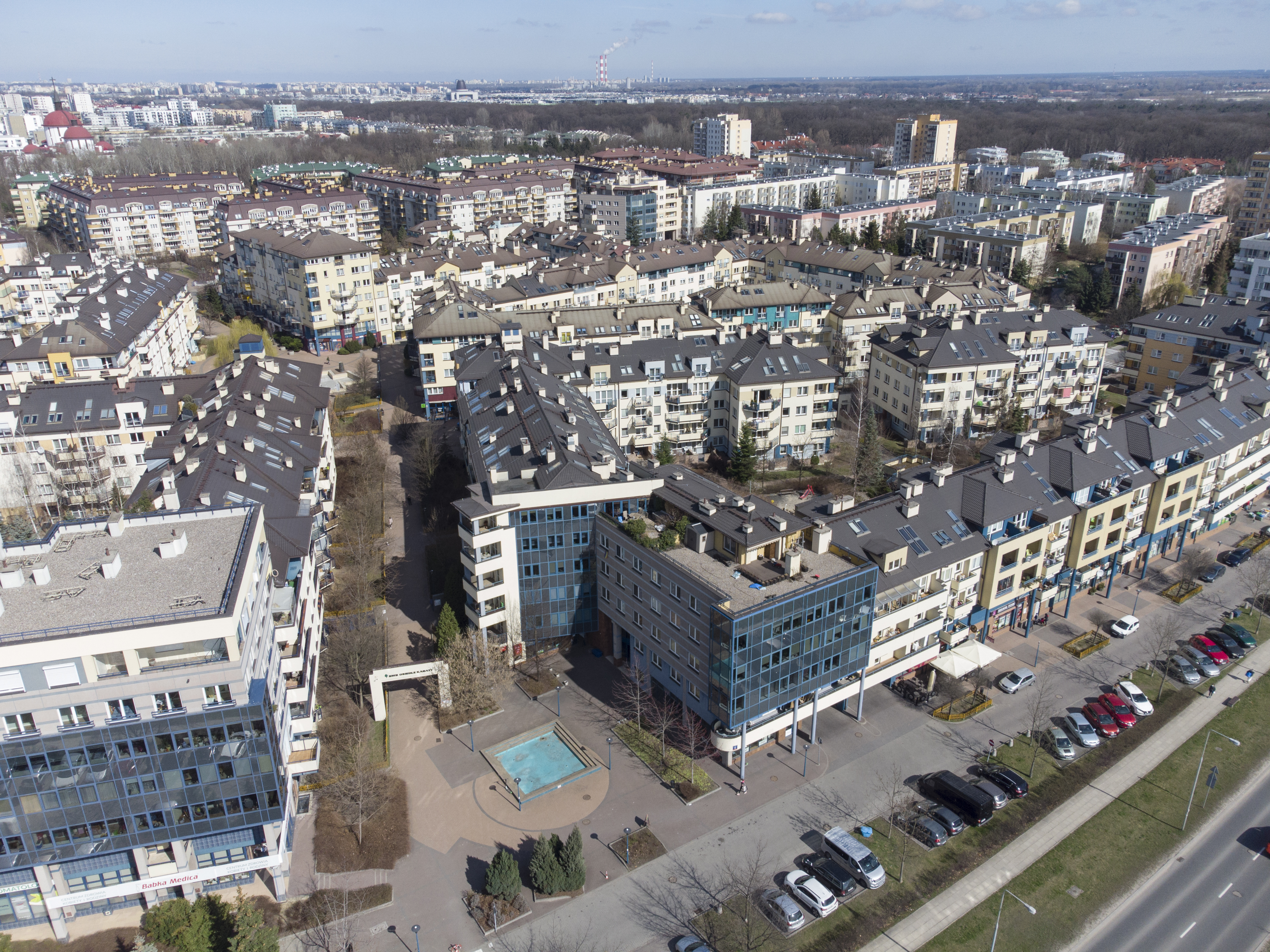
The apartment buildings on Wąwozowa Street in Kabaty.

Kabaty is a residential area dominated with the high-rise apartment buildings. In 2024, it had around 30,000 residents. The area includes the housing estate of Kabaty, located between Jeżewskiego, Wańkowicza, Kiepury, Dembego, Rosoła and Wąwozowa Streets. There is also the Przy SGGW Housing Association Neighbourhood, consisting of three postmodern buildings at 11 and 13 Przy Bażantarni Street. Additionally the edges of the neighbourhood features low-rise single-family housing. This includes the area near the Warsaw Escarpment, to the east of Relaksowa Street, including of the neighbourhood of Stare Kabaty (Old Kabaty). There is also a small portion of the neighbourhood of Moczydło, centred on Ustronie Street in the northwest.

The neighbourhood has the Kabaty station of the M1 line of Warsaw Metro rapid transit underground system, located at the intersection of Komisji Edukacji Narodowej Avenue and Wąwozowa Street, as well as the Kabaty Technical and Storage Station, a motive power depot for the metro system, located near the Kabaty Woods. Additionally, the neighbourhood also includes St. Padre Pio Church at 25 Rybałtów Street, belonging to the Catholic denomination.

== Location and boundaries ==
Kabaty is a City Information System area of Warsaw, within the south-eastern portion of the Ursynów district. To the north, its border is approximately determined by Przy Bażantarni Street, Komisji Edukacji Narodowej Avenue, Jeżewskiego Street, Rosoła Street, and around the possessions at 22 Rosoła Street; to the east, by the border of the Ursynów district; to the south, by the Kabaty Woods; and to the west, by Ustronie Street, Wełniana Street, Stryjeńskich Street, and around the possession of the Kabaty Technical and Storage Station.

It borders Natolin to the north, Błonia Wilanowskie and Powsin to the east, and the Kabaty Woods Nature Reserve to the southeast. Its eastern boundary form the border between districts of Ursynów and Wilanów.
