= Moczydło, Warsaw =

Neighbourhood in Warsaw, Poland

Moczydło
- Neighbourhood
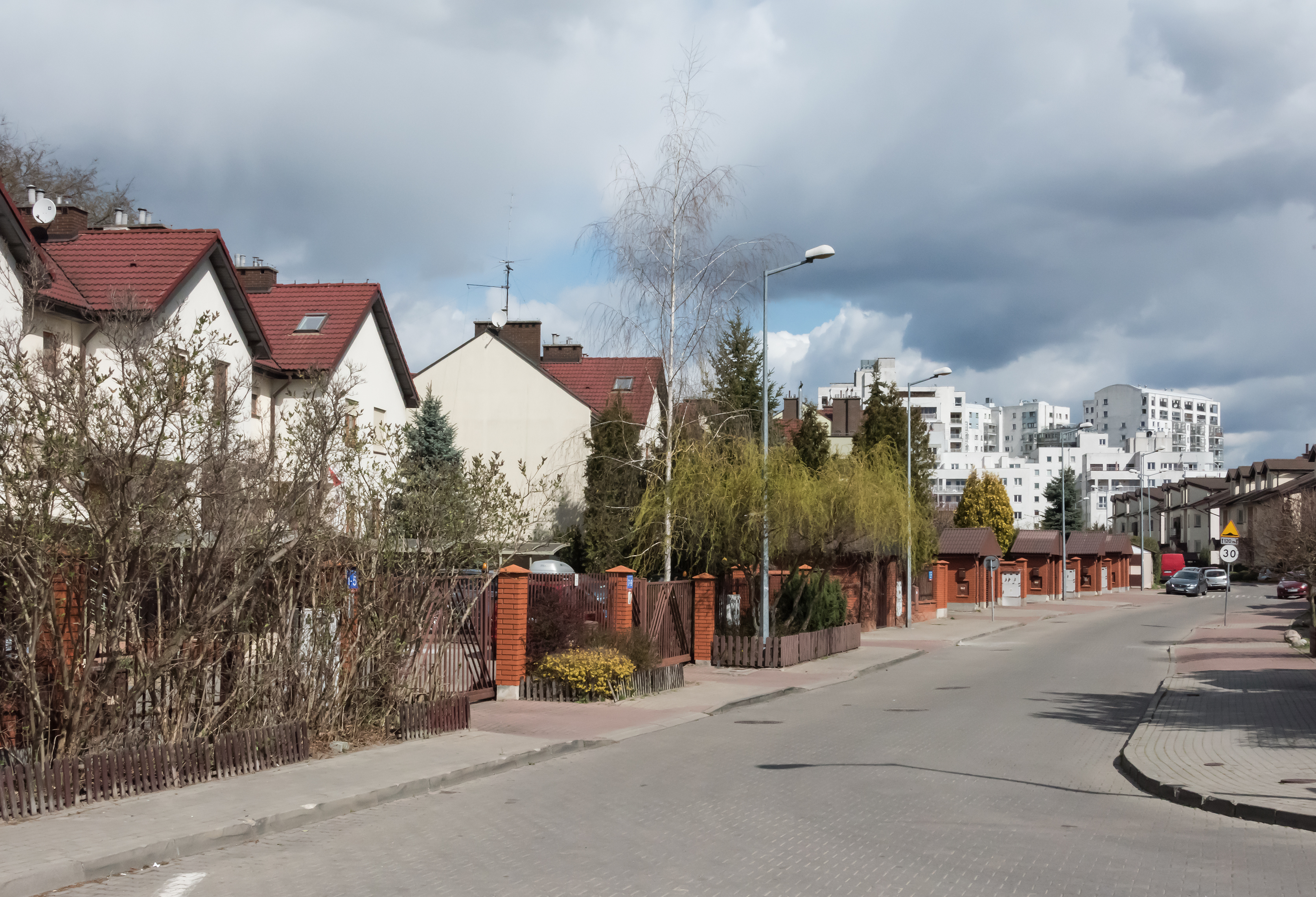
- Houses on Jaworowa Street in Moczydło in 2020.
- Interactive map of Moczydło
- Coordinates: 52°07′56″N 21°03′22″E
- Country: Poland
- Voivodeship: Masovian
- City and county: Warsaw
- District: Ursynów
- City Information System areas: Kabaty; Natolin
- Time zone: UTC+1 (CET)
  - Summer (DST): UTC+2 (CEST)
- Area code: +48 22

Moczydło (Polish: [mɔˈt͡ʂɘ̟.dwɔ]) is a neighbourhood in Warsaw, Poland, located within the district of Ursynów, in the City Information System areas of Kabaty and Natolin. It a residential area dominated by single-family housing.

== History ==
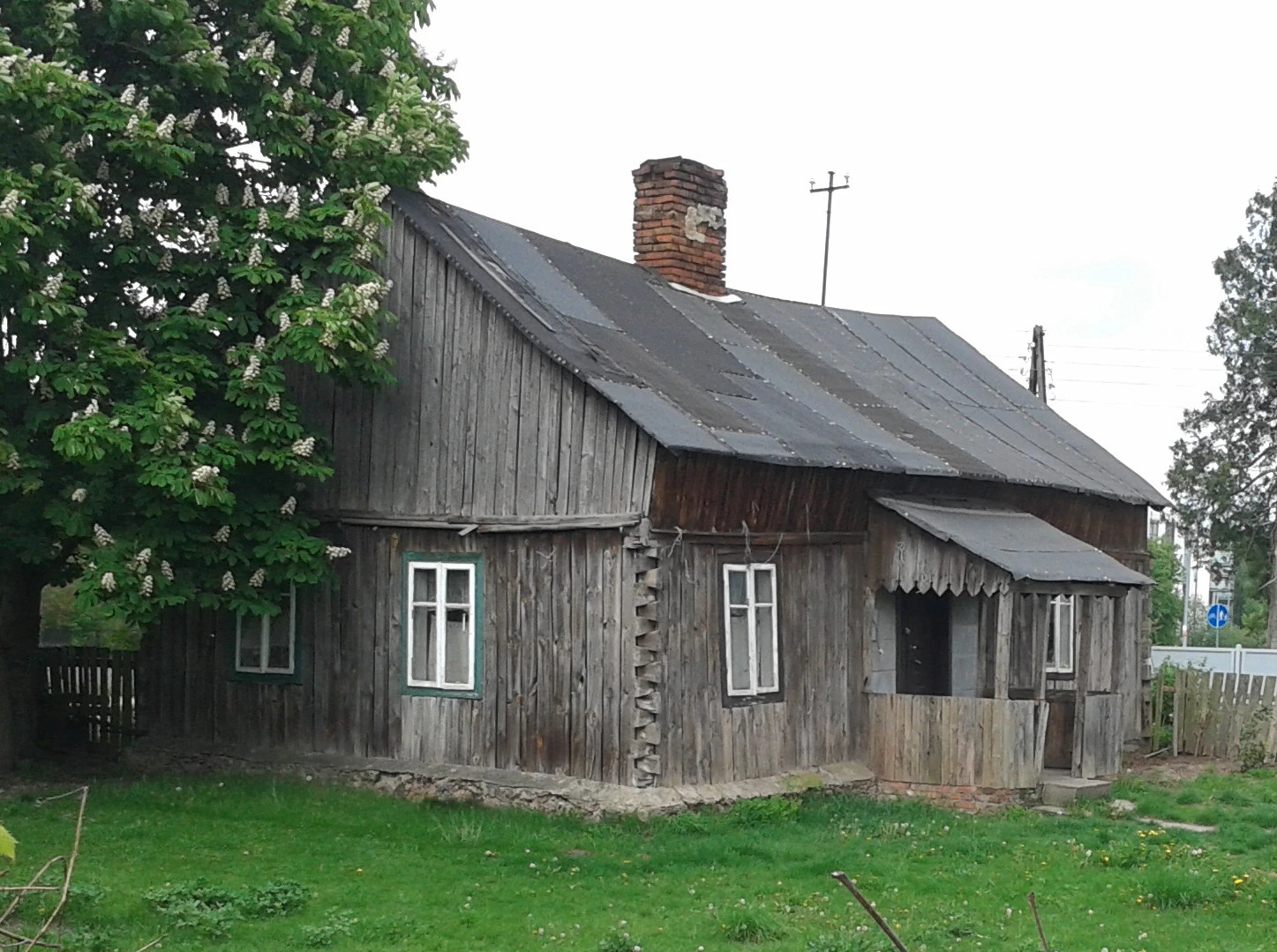
The historical farming building at 37 Wełniana Street in Moczydło, in 2015.

The earliest known records of Moczydło date to 1528. It was a small farming community, located on the road leading to Imielin, within the Catholic Parish of St. Catherine. The village was owned and inhabited by a petty nobility. Between 1580 and 1658, the village and its adjusted farmlands, had an area of around 9 ha, and in 1661, there were 5 houses.

It was owned by the Dąbrowski family until 1725, when it was sold together with Wolica to Elżbieta Sieniawska, owner of the Wilanów Estate, for the price of 60,000 złoties. She ordered protection of the nearby Kabaty Woods from deforestation. In 1775, the village had 7 houses, and in 1785, 10 houses. In 1827, it had 10 houses and 80 inhabitants. Between 1850 and 1861, the population of Moczydło fought in court to lower costs of their feudal duties. Following the abolition of serfdom in 1864, the village was incorporated into the municipality of Wilanów. At the time it was inhabited by 131 people and included 360 ha privately owned farmland, and 36 ha of nobility-owned farmland. In 1905, there were 20 houses and 146 inhabitants.

In 1879, in Moczydło was a built horse stable, owned by count Ludwik Józef Krasiński, and the village became specialised in breeding horses for the local upper class. In the 1930s, it became a supplier for the newly opened nearby Służewiec Horse Racing Track. It operated until the beginning of the Second World War. The ruins of the stable survive to the present day, now with the protected status of a cultural property.

Following the end of the war, the farmlands in the area were nationalised. On 14 May 1951, Moczydło was incorporated into the city of Warsaw. In 1956, the area was given by the state to the Warsaw University of Life Sciences.

In 2009, there was opened the Moczydełko Park.

Currently, the area is a residential neighbourhood, dominated by single-family housing, with some presence of the multifamily housing. There remain a few surviving historical structures of the former village.

== Characteristics ==
Moczydło is a residential neighbourhood within the district of Ursynów located within the City Information System areas of Kabaty and Natolin. It is dominated by the single-family housing, with some presence of the multifamily housing.

Between Stryjeńskich Street and Wełniana Street is place the Moczydełko Park, which is centred on the pond Moczydło 3. Nearby are also ponds Moczydło 1 and Moczydło 2.
