= Lisy, Warsaw =

Neighbourhood in Warsaw, Poland

Lisy
- Neighbourhood
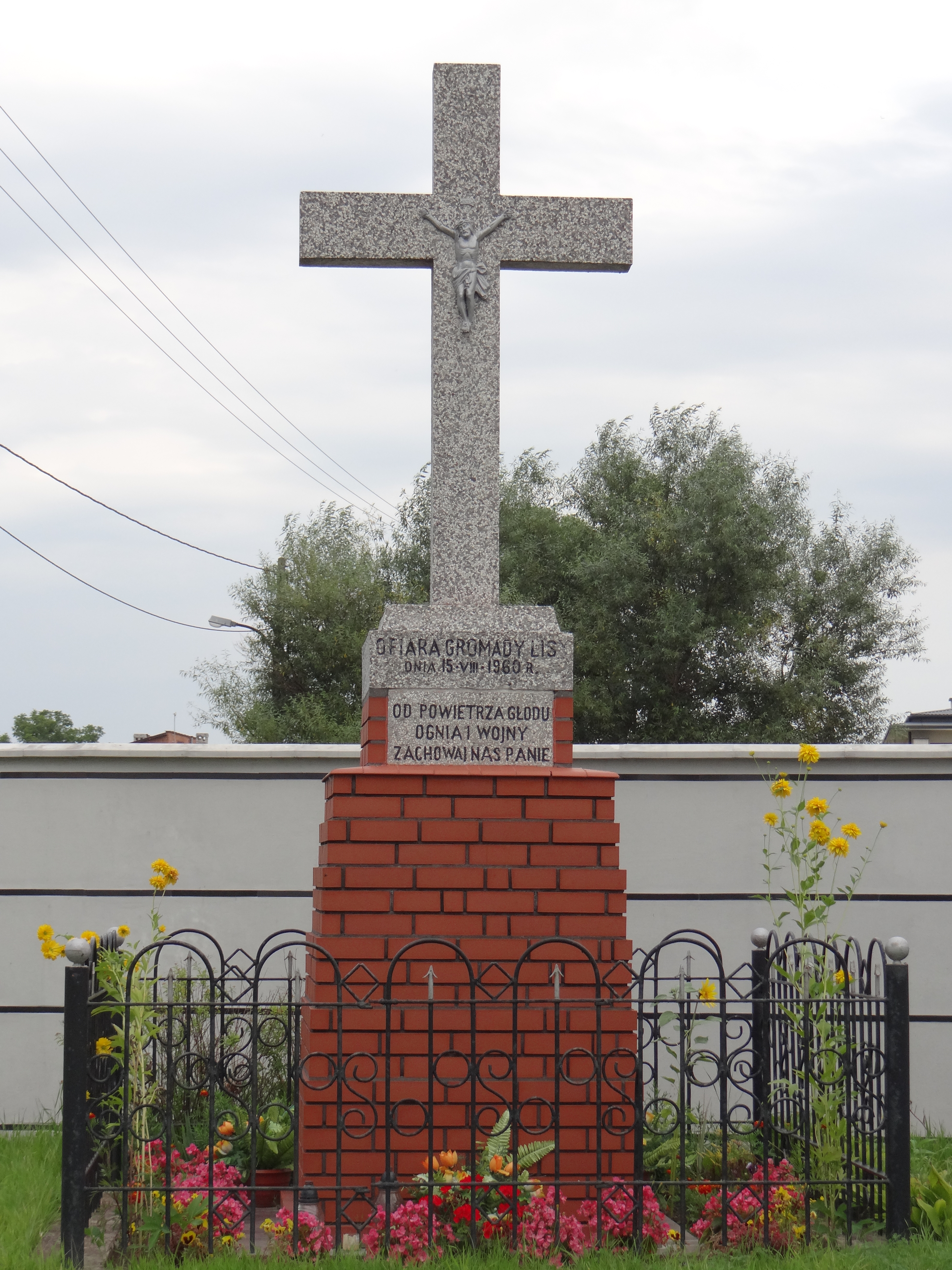
- A Christian cross in Lisy in 2012.
- Interactive map of Lisy
- Coordinates: 52°07′47″N 21°07′35″E
- Country: Poland
- Voivodeship: Masovian
- City and county: Warsaw
- District: Wilanów
- City Information System area: Powsin
- Time zone: UTC+1 (CET)
  - Summer (DST): UTC+2 (CEST)
- Postal code: 02-998
- Area code: +48 22

Lisy (Polish: [ˈli.sɘ̟]) is a neighbourhood in Warsaw, Poland, located within the district of Wilanów, in the City Information System area of Powsin. It is a small residential neighbourhood with lowrise single-family housing, placed next to the Lisy Lake.

== History ==
The oldest records of the village of Lisy date to the 15th century, when it was owned by the noble family of Ciołek.

In 1684, a part of Lisy was bought by John III Sobieski and incorporated into the Wilanów Estate, while the rest was bought in 1723 by Elżbieta Sieniawska, and incorporated into the village of Wilanów.

Following the abolition of serfdom in 1864, the village became a part of the municipality of Wilanów. It was incorporated into the city of Warsaw on 14 May 1951.

== Characteristics ==
Lisy is a small residential neighbourhood with lowrise single-family housing, and with presence of the farmlands. It is placed next to the Lisy Lake, and between neighbourhoods of Powsin and Latoszki. It borders the village of Bielawa to the south.
