= Kolonia Latoszkowa =

Neighbourhood of Warsaw, Poland

- Neighbourhood
- Interactive map of Kolonia Latoszkowa
- Coordinates: 52.134374°N 21.135154°E
- Country: Poland
- Voivodeship: Masovian
- City and county: Warsaw
- District: Wilanów
- CIS area: Powsin
- Time zone: UTC+1 (CET)
  - Summer (DST): UTC+2 (CEST)
- Area code: +48 22

Kolonia Latoszkowa (Polish: [kɔˈlɔɲ.ja la.tɔʂˈkɔ.va]) is a neighbourhood is Warsaw, Poland, within the Wilanów district. It is a residential are with low-rise single-family housing. The neighbourhood is located in the area of Prętowa and Rosy Streets. It is placed in the southeastern portion of the City Information System area of Powsin.
