= Stare Kabaty =

Neighbourhood in Warsaw, Poland

- Neighbourhood
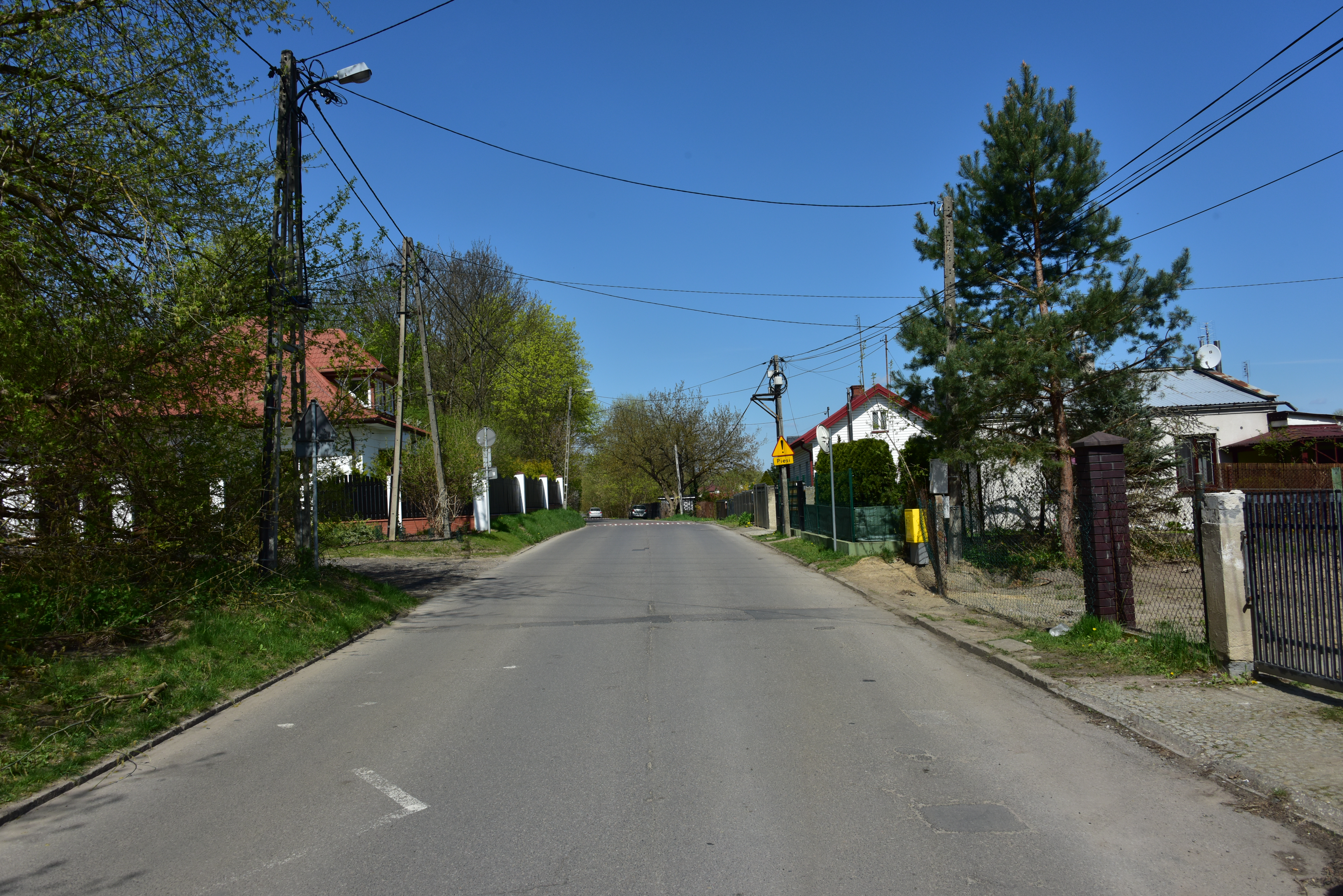
- Houses on Gąsek Street in Stare Kabaty, in 2022.
- Interactive map of Stare Kabaty
- Coordinates: 52°07′47″N 21°04′50″E
- Country: Poland
- Voivodeship: Masovian
- City and county: Warsaw
- Districts: Ursynów; Wilanów
- City Information System areas: Kabaty; Powsin
- Time zone: UTC+1 (CET)
  - Summer (DST): UTC+2 (CEST)
- Area code: +48 22

Stare Kabaty (Polish: [ˈsta.rɛ kaˈba.tɘ̟]; lit. 'Old Kabaty') is a neighbourhood in of Warsaw, Poland. It is located at the boundary between districts of Ursynów and Wilanów, and divided between City Information System areas of Kabaty and Powsin. It is a small residential area consisting of single-family housing, located between Relaksowa Street and Warsaw Escarpment.

The oldest known records of Kabaty date to 1386, when it was a small farming community. It was incorporated into Warsaw in 1951.

== History ==
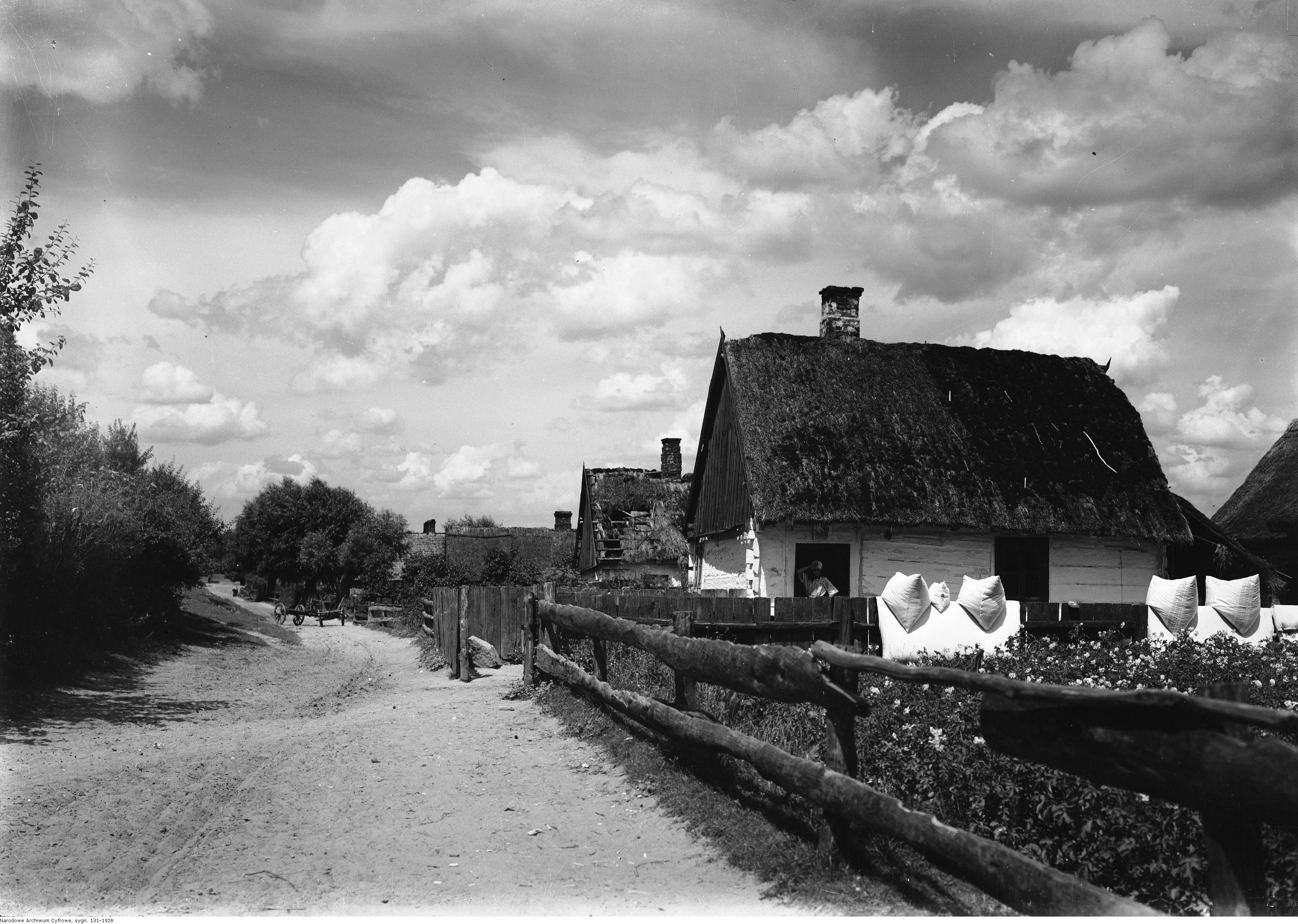
The village of Kabaty in 1926.

The oldest known records of Kabady come from 1386, when it received Kulm law privileges from duke Janusz I the Old, ruler of the Duchy of Warsaw. It was a small farming community, located at the edge of the Warsaw Escarpment, and on a road connecting Warsaw and Czersk. The village was owned by the Ciołek family until 17th century, when it was acquired by the Piekarski family.

In 1580, Kabaty and their adjusted farmlands had combined area of around 70 ha. In 1656, it was completely destroyed by the Swedish army during the Second Northern War.

In 1721, Kabaty was sold to noblewoman and landowner Elżbieta Sieniawska, who incorporated it into the Wilanów Estate. In 1726, she ordered the protection of the nearby Kabaty Woods from deforestation. As such, wood needed for construction in Kabaty was imported from Sieniawska's estate in Nieporęt.

In 1775, the village had 16 houses, and in 1827, it had a population of 177 people in 17 houses.

Between 1850 and 1861, the populations of Kabaty and Moczydło fought in court to lower the costs of their feudal duties. Following the abolition of serfdom in 1864, Kabaty was incorporated into the municipality of Wilanów. In 1892, the village was bought by Ksawery Branicki, who then established there a local woods administration.

In 1905, the village was inhabited by 319 people in 38 houses, and in 1920, by 397 people in 59 houses. During the interwar period, a holiday village was established in the nearby Kabaty Woods, featuring 8 houses and the population of 61 people. On 31 December 1938, the city of Warsaw bought the Kabaty Woods, and dedicated its portion for an urban development. On 11 August 1980, it was given the status of the nature reserve. Kabaty was incorporated into the city of Warsaw on 14 May 1951.

On 31 December 1938, the city of Warsaw bought the Kabaty Woods, and dedicated its portion for urban development. On 11 August 1980, it was given the status of the nature reserve.

On 15 May 1951, Kabaty were incorporated into the city of Warsaw.

Begging in 1987, and continuing throughout 1990s and 2000s, numerous housing estates with apartment buildings were developed to the east of historical Kabaty. As such the historical single-family housing portion of the area, to the east of Relaksowa Street, became known as Stare Kabaty (lit. 'Old Kabaty').

In 2017, Rosnowskiego and Korbońskiego Streets were built, connecting Kabaty, and Ursynów at large, with the Wilanów district.

== Characteristics ==
Stare Kabaty is a single-family housing neighbourhood, located between Relaksowa Street and Warsaw Escarpment. It is placed at the boundary of the City Information System areas of Kabaty and Powsin, which form the border of districts of Ursynów and Wilanów.
