= Jana Rosoła Street, Warsaw =

Street in Warsaw, Poland

Coordinates: 52.1461°N 21.0626°E

Jan Rosół Street
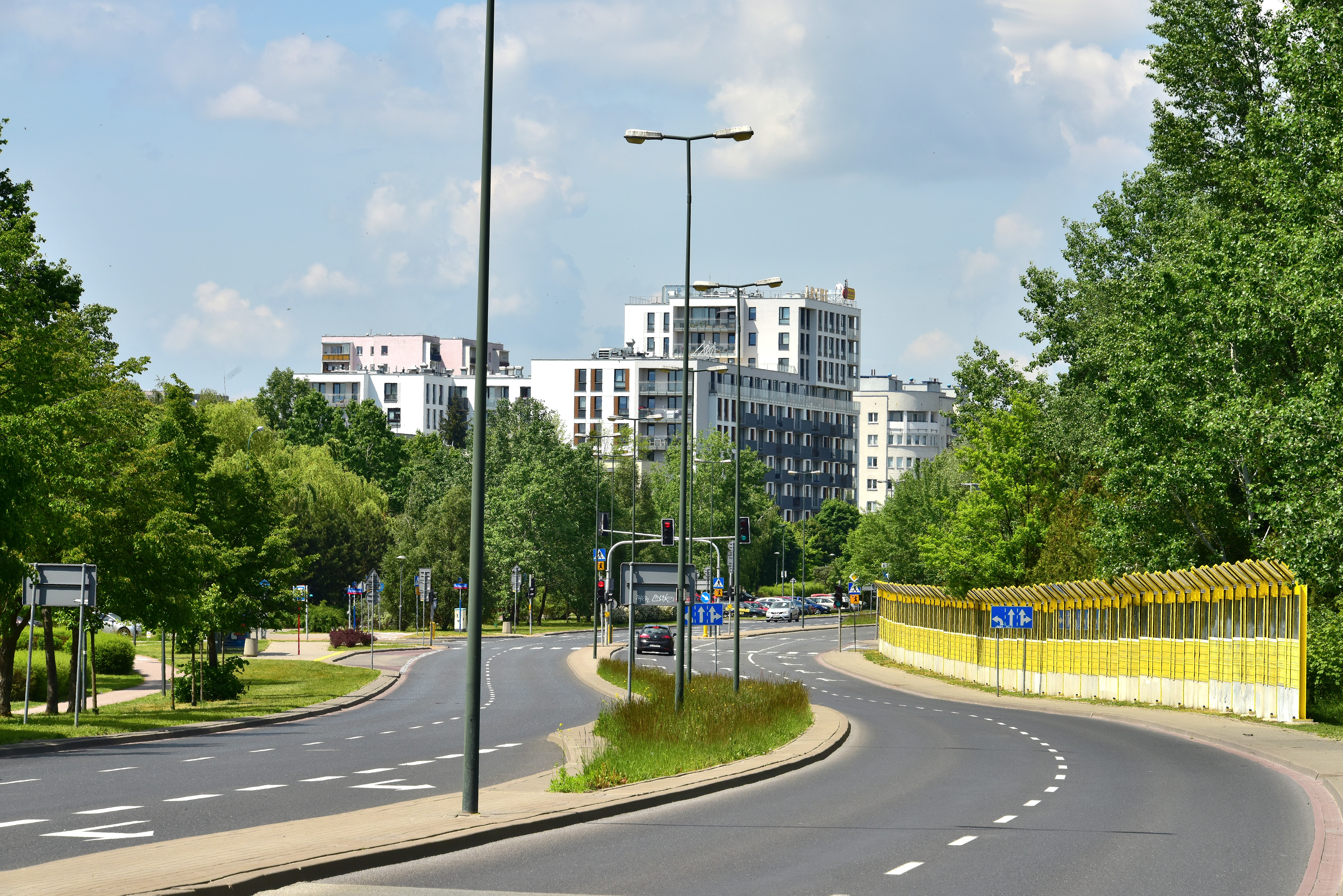
- Interactive map of Jan Rosół Street
- Length: 3.4 km (2.1 mi)
- Location: Ursynów, Warsaw
- East end: Wąwozowa Street
- West end: Ciszewskiego Street

Construction
- Inauguration: =1970s

The Jan Rosół Street (Polish: Ulica Jana Rosoła) is one of the three main thoroughfares of Warsaw's borough of Ursynów. Named after Jan Rosół, participant of the January Uprising, it links Wąwozowa Street in the southernmost neighbourhood of Kabaty with the Dolina Służewiecka, (Note: The last leg, from the intersection with Jana Ciszewskiego Street to the Dolina Służewiecka itself bears the name of Jan Rodowicz since 2005.) that is Warsaw's section of National road 2, itself part of European route E30. The street was planned in the 1970s as one of principal arteries of the planned residential area of Ursynów, (Note: Along with Komisji Edukacji Narodowej Street and Pileckiego Street; the latter was initially named after a Polish communist politician Paweł Finder, but was renamed to its modern name after 1989.) where most of road traffic would be channelled. Most other streets in the borough serve for local traffic only, or connect the three principal arteries. The street itself started to be built in 1975, two years later the first plattenbau blocks of flats were completed in Ursynów.

The street is mostly parallel to the Vistula Escarpment and the old cobbled Nowoursynowska Street that joined the Natolin Palace and surrounding villages with the city of Warsaw since the 17th century.

There are numerous notable landmarks located along the course of the 3.4 kilometre long street, including the main campus of the Warsaw University of Life Sciences and the Natolin Palace.

== Its course ==
It starts on the south being a cross with Relaksowa and Wąwozowa streets. Then it goes north and it is passing by streets: Kiepury, Jeżewskiego, Nowoursynowska, Przy Bażantarni, Lokajskiego, Belgradzka, Mandarynki, Pietraszewicza, Pachnąca, Migdałowa, Płaskowickiej, Wesoła, Nugat and Indiry Gandhi. Further it is called Rodowicza "Anody" street, but to 2005 Jan Rosół was a patron of this length too. In Kabaty street is the west border of a settlement Stare Kabaty.
