= Fort Srebrna Góra =

Fort in Poland

- Twierdza Srebrna Góra (Polish)
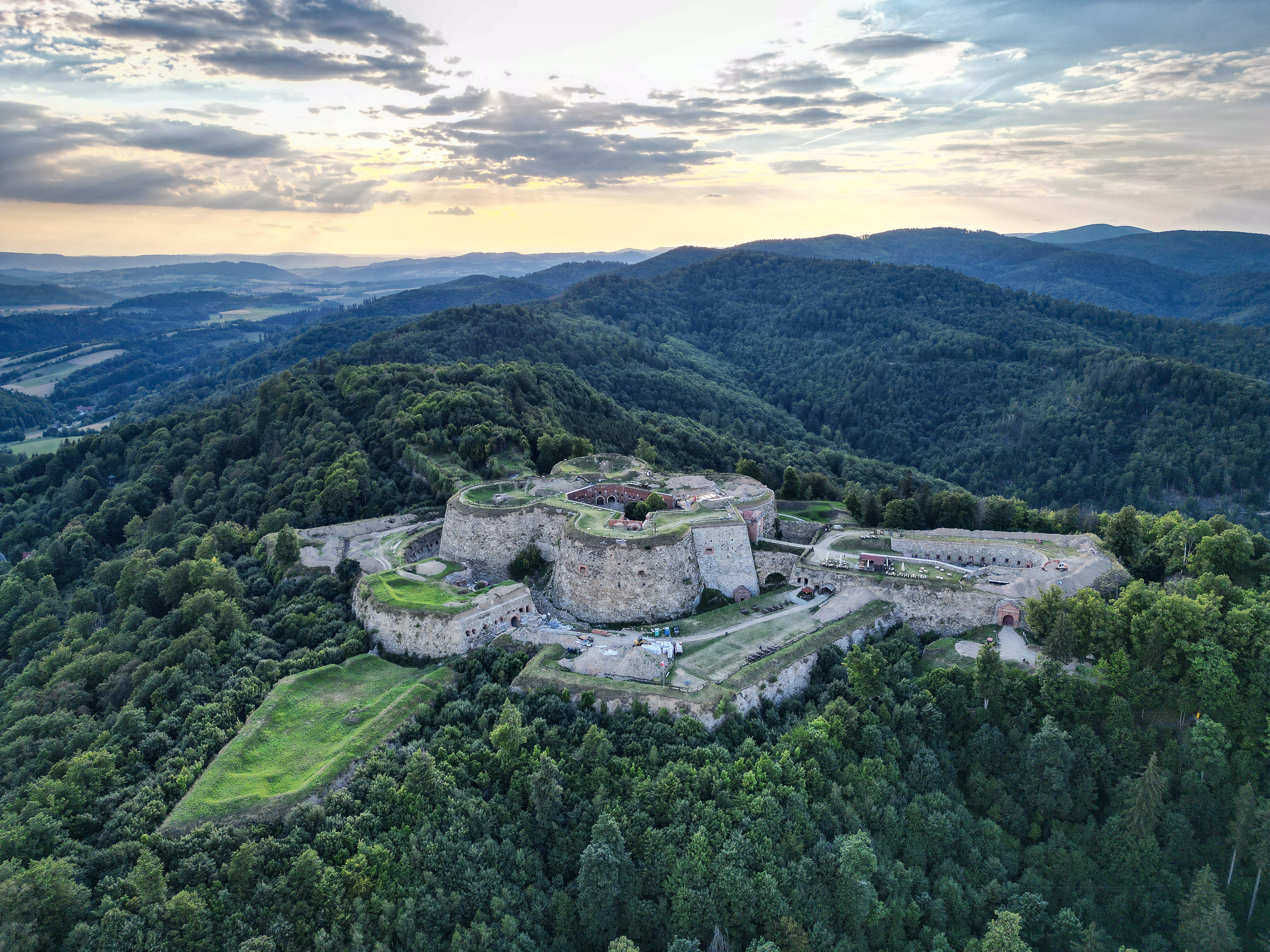
- Aerial view of the fort

- Location within Poland

General information
- Type: fortification
- Location: Srebrna Góra, Lower Silesian Voivodeship, Poland
- Coordinates: 50°34′30″N 16°38′34″E
- Construction started: 1765
- Completed: 1777

Historic Monument of Poland
- Designated: 2004-04-14
- Reference no.: Dz. U. z 2004 r. Nr 102, poz. 1058

Fort Srebrna Góra (Polish: Twierdza Srebrna Góra, German: Festung Silberberg, lit. "Silver Mountain Fort") is a former military fort now preserved as a monument and museum, located in the village of Srebrna Góra, Lower Silesian Voivodeship, Poland. It was constructed between 1765 and 1777, when the area was part of the Kingdom of Prussia.

The fort is one of Poland's official national Historic Monuments (Pomnik historii), designated on May 1, 2004. The National Heritage Board of Poland maintains its listing. It is recognized as a rare example of a surviving European 18th-century mountain stronghold.

The fort has been nicknamed the "Gibraltar of Prussia" or "Gibraltar of Silesia," referring to its solid bedrock foundation.

== History ==
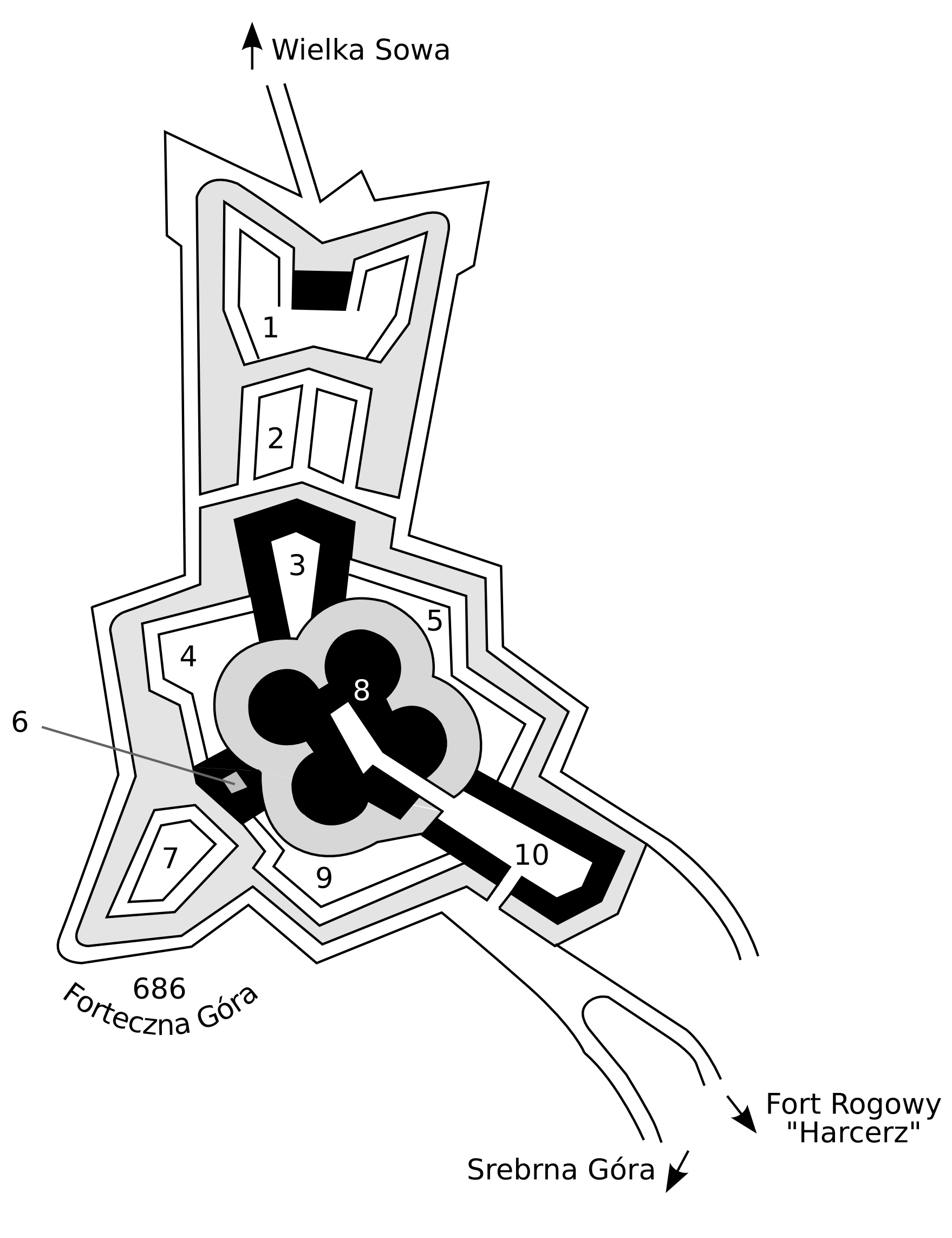
Map of the fort

The fortress was built in 1764–1777 by order of Frederick II, King of Prussia. Prussian architect Ludwig Wilhelm Regeler oversaw the design, assisted by military engineers. Additional minor work followed, but no major alterations were made; a nearby flanked fort was begun but quickly abandoned. The complex consisted of six forts, several bastions, and related structures. The central Donżon Fort on Warowna Góra hill was the main fortification.

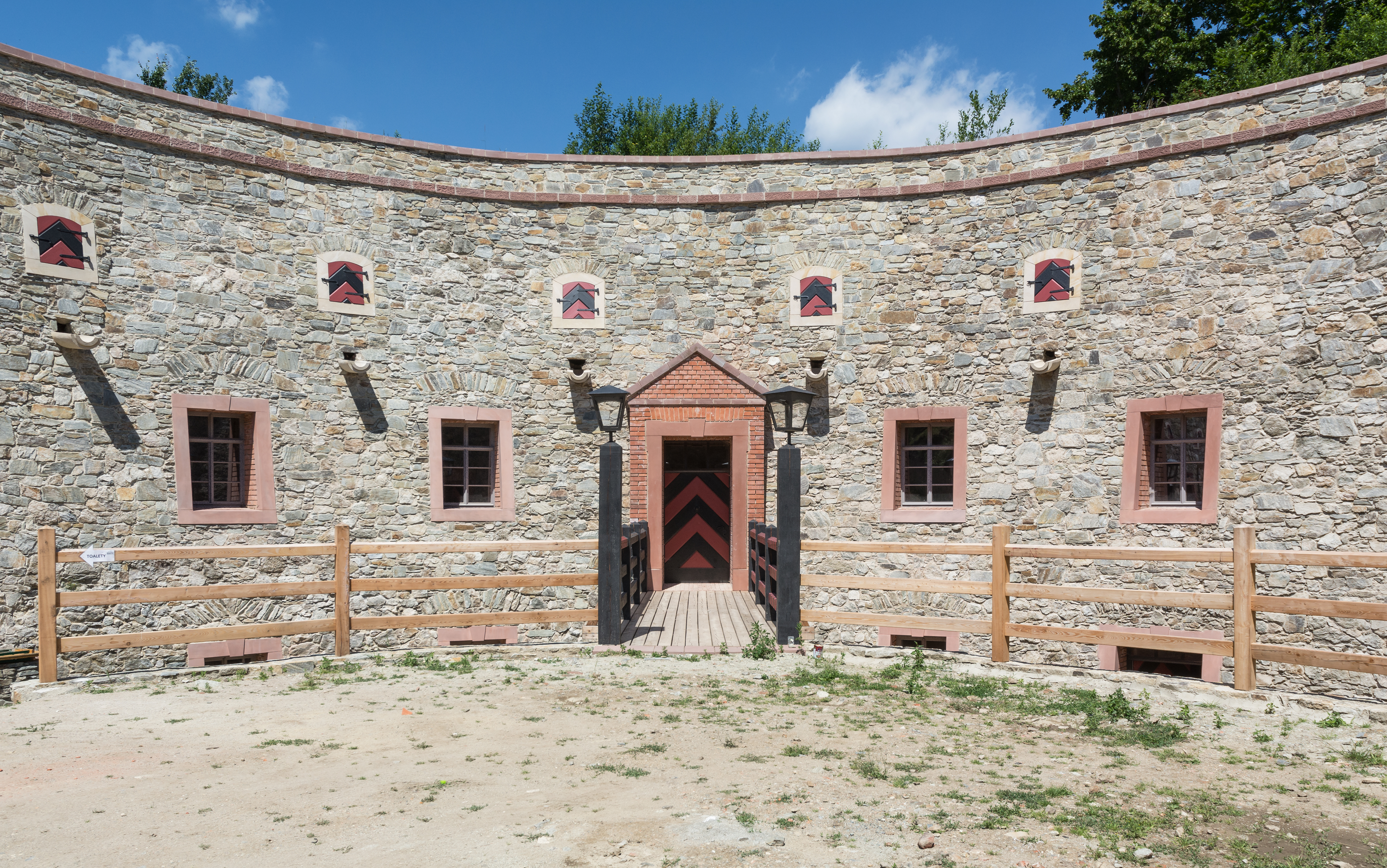
View of the lower bastion

Situated in the Sudety Mountains, which form a natural boundary between the Kłodzko Valley and the Silesian Lowlands, the fort controlled the passage through the Silver Valley (Polish: Przełęcz Srebrna, German: Pass von Silberberg). It spans three hills: Ostróg (627 m, German: Spitzberg), Warowna Góra (686 m, German: Silberbergpass), and Wielki Chochoł (740 m, German: Grosse Strohhaube). The fort could accommodate a garrison of 4,000 soldiers, with supplies to endure a year-long siege. It was armed with 264 artillery pieces. The fortress was intended to secure the route linking Prussian territories with southern Bohemia and to defend against potential Austrian incursions. Cost of construction was reported to amount to 4.5 million Prussian thalers in 1858.

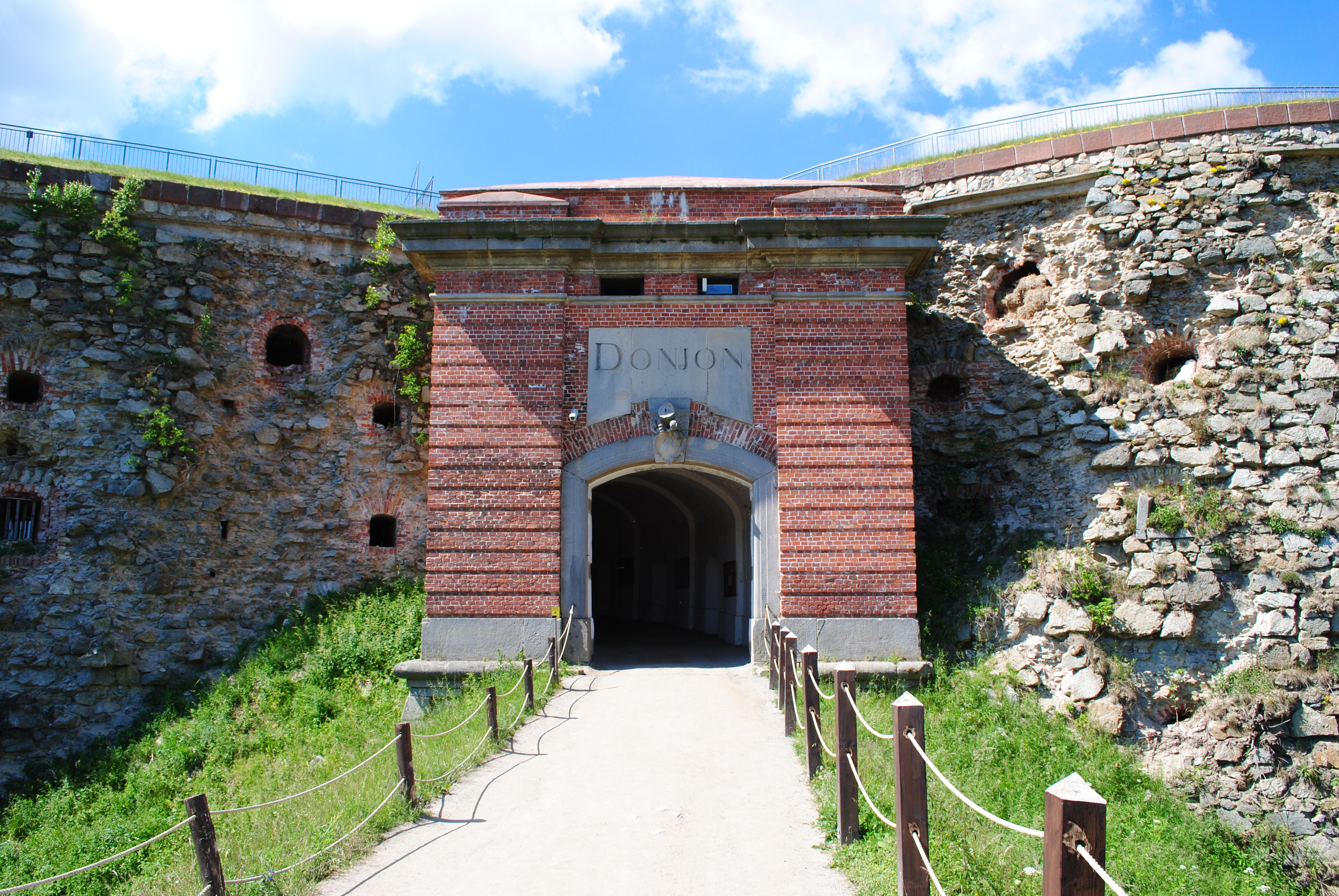
Entry into the donjon

On June 28, 1807, Fort Srebrna Góra withstood a siege by Napoleonic forces during the War of the Fourth Coalition, its only active engagement. Therefore the fort was never captured in battle. By 1860, it was declared obsolete and the garrison was reduced. It ceased active military use in 1867. The fort's relatively unaltered condition contributes to its status as a valuable historical monument. It has also served as a military training site, and, by the late 19th century, has become a tourist attraction, opening a restaurant in 1885. A youth hostel opened in 1913 and a museum in 1931, which attracted some 50,000 visitors annually by the 1930s.

During World War II, the fortress functioned as a POW camp (Oflag VII-B 1939–1941, Stalag 367 1941–1945) for Polish officers. Notable prisoners included Counter Admiral Stefan Frankowski, General Tadeusz Piskor, and Rear Admiral Józef Unrug. Several escape attempts have occurred, including ten Polish escapees in May 1940. Seven people were recaptured, while three other traveled through occupied Czechia, Slovakia, Hungary, Yugoslavia, Greece, and Turkey to Mandatory Palestine, joining the Polish Independent Carpathian Rifle Brigade. After the war, the fortress became part of Poland's Recovered Territories. In 1961, Poland's Registry of Cultural Property entered Fort Srebrna Góra into its registry of objects of cultural heritage. A military museum was established in 1973 and the site was designated a culture park in 2002. In 2004, it was officially recognized as a Historic Monument (Pomnik historii).

== Current status ==
The fort is open to tourists.

A historical reenactment group continues to maintain the traditions of the Prussian infantry unit that was once stationed at the fort.
