= Kępa Latoszkowa =

Neighbourhood of Warsaw, Poland

- Neighbourhood
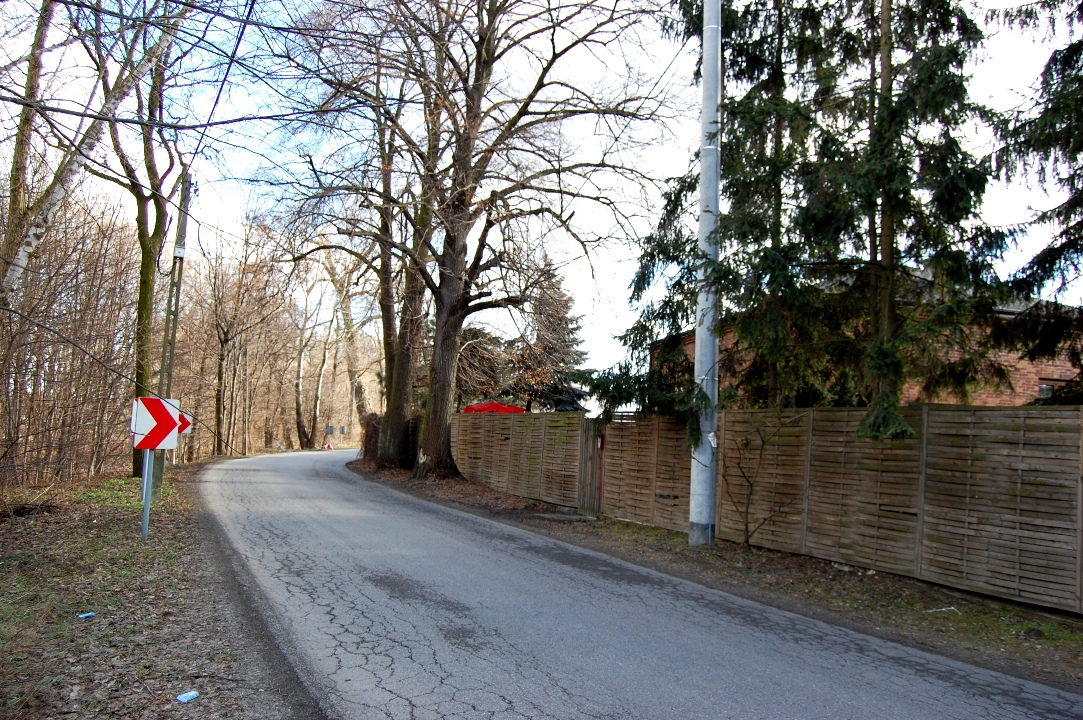
- A house on Rosy Street in Kępa Latoszkowa.
- Interactive map of Kępa Latoszkowa
- Coordinates: 52°08′35″N 21°07′45″E
- Country: Poland
- Voivodeship: Masovian
- City and county: Warsaw
- District: Wilanów
- CIS area: Powsin
- Time zone: UTC+1 (CET)
  - Summer (DST): UTC+2 (CEST)
- Area code: +48 22

Kępa Latoszkowa (Polish: [ˈkɛm.pa la.tɔʂˈkɔ.va]) is a neighbourhood is Warsaw, Poland, within the Wilanów district. It is a residential area with low-rise single-family housing. The neighbourhood is located allongside Ruczaj and Rosy Streets and the Wilanówka river. It is placed in the northeast portion of the City Information System area of Powsin.

== History ==
The hamlet of Kępa Latoszkowa was founded in 1831 and included 10 households. In 1867, the village was incorporated into the municipality of Wilanów. In 1905, the Kępa Latoszkowa had 107 inhabitants in 11 households, and in 1921, it had 80 inhabitants in 14 households.

On 26 September 1943, while the area was under the German occupation during the Second World War, the Home Army resistance members targeted German settlers in Kępa Latoszkowa, as part of the Operation Wilanów. Four houses were burned down, and twelve people, assosiated with anti-Polish activity, were killed. This included tree officers of the Blue Police, and the family and coworkers of August Friedrich Boraun, the leader of the National Socialist German Workers' Party division in the village. Kępa Latoszkowa was incorporated into the city of Warsaw on 15 May 1951.
