= Kabaty Woods =

Woodland park in Warsaw, Poland

Stefan Starzyński Kabaty Woods Nature Reserve Polish: Rezerwat przyrody Las Kabacki im. Stefana Starzyńskiego
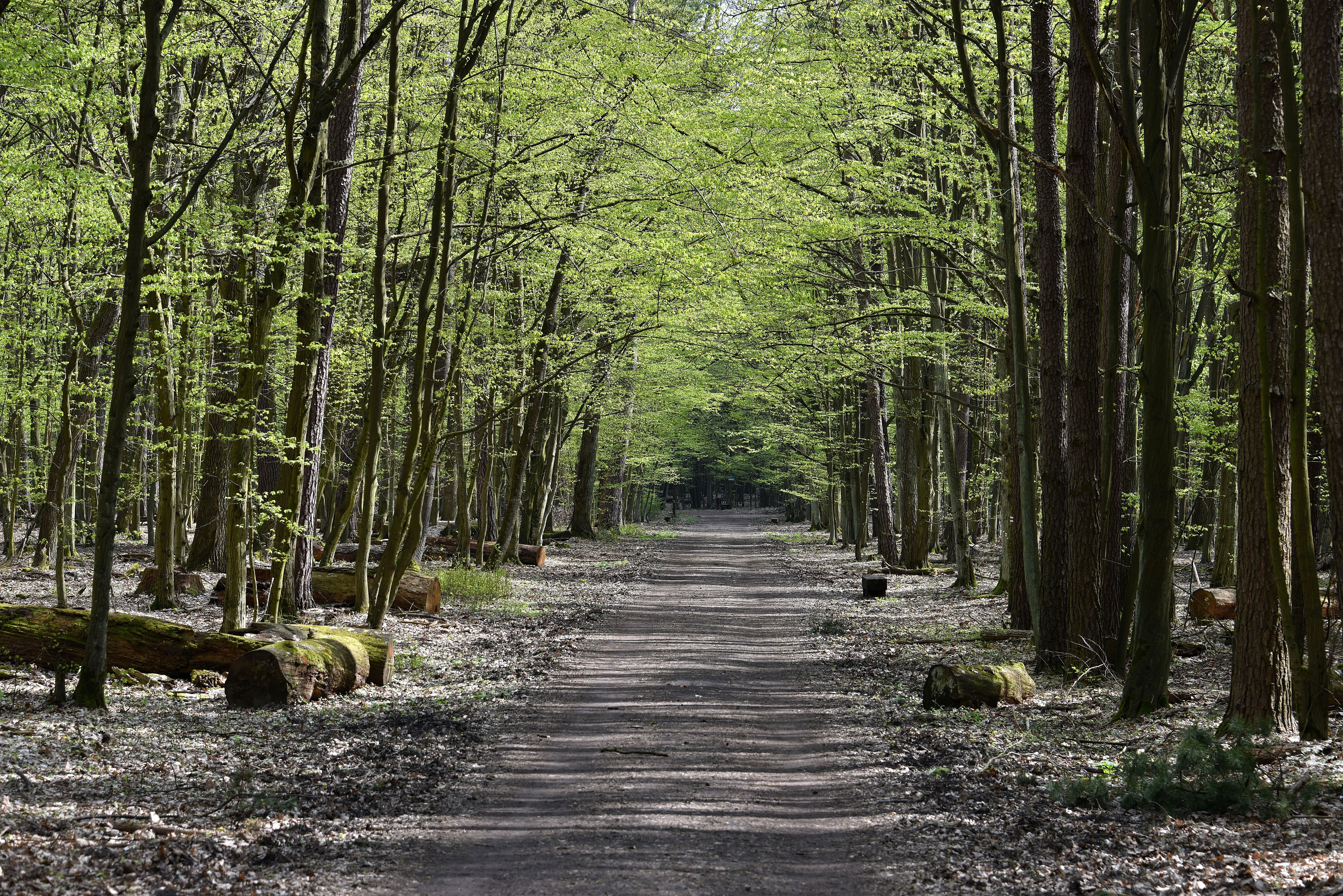

- Location within Poland
- Interactive map of Stefan Starzyński Kabaty Woods Nature Reserve

Geography
- Location: Warsaw, Masovian Voivodeship, Poland
- Coordinates: 52.1161°N 21.0572°E

Administration
- Status: Nature reserve

The Stefan Starzyński Kabaty Woods Nature Reserve (Polish: Rezerwat przyrody Las Kabacki im. Stefana Starzyńskiego) is a woodland park located in southern Warsaw, between two major arteries, Puławska and Łukasz Drewny Streets. Administratively the park belongs to southern Warsaw's Ursynów district.

The Kabaty Woods lie on flat ground, except for an east part comprising hills of dune origin. A striking landscape accent is a high escarpment above the glacial valley of the Vistula River, which forms the reserve's eastern border.

The Kabaty Woods are a reservoir of fresh air for the surrounding housing developments, as well as a popular place of rest and recreation. The Woods are easily reached via buses and the Warsaw Metro.

During the German occupation of Poland (World War II), it was the site of a massacre of 200 Poles, perpetrated by the Germans in December 1939 and January 1940 as part of the genocidal Intelligenzaktion campaign.

== Origin of name ==
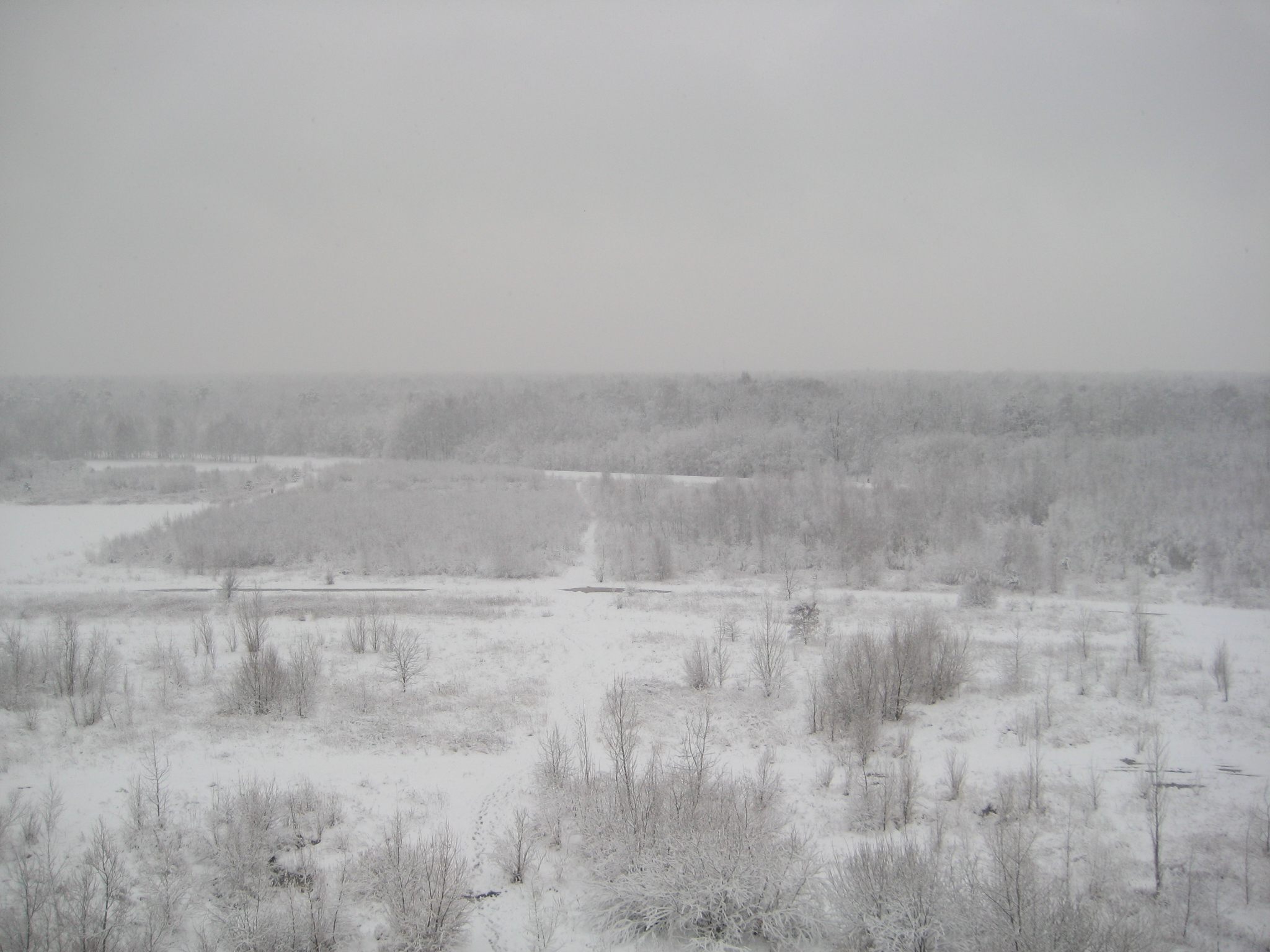
Kabaty Woods in snow

The Kabaty Woods are named after Kabaty, a village that once stood on the picturesque banks of the Vistula River.

The woods reserve has subsequently been named for Stefan Starzyński, Warsaw's patriotic mayor who in 1938 secured its purchase from private owners. During World War II, Starzyński was captured and executed by the Germans.

== Fauna and flora ==
Despite the losses that the Kabaty Woods suffered during World War II, a unique multi-species vegetation and rich undergrowth survived. There are large areas covered with 120-160-year-old trees, with many monumental oaks, pines and beeches. In the upper floor grow oak, pine, birch, aspen, but also beech, larch, linden, maple, ash and elm. The old woods comprise linden, oak, hornbeam and maple. There are also apple, pear and cherry trees. The shrub layer includes hazel, and the rich undergrowth includes rare plants and protected species such as Lilium martagon, Lycopodium clavatum, Carex brizoides, as well as lilies-of-the valley.

The rich plant environment favors a wealth of animals — deer, wild boar, fox, badger, weasel, pine marten, hedgehog — and various birds: buzzard, Eurasian hobby, kestrel, sparrow hawk, tawny owl, long-eared owl, green woodpecker and black woodpecker, wilson, crossbill, bullfinch and others. Particularly notable are the tree frog, blind worm, and grass snake.

Hiking trails facilitate exploration of the Woods.

== Points of interest ==
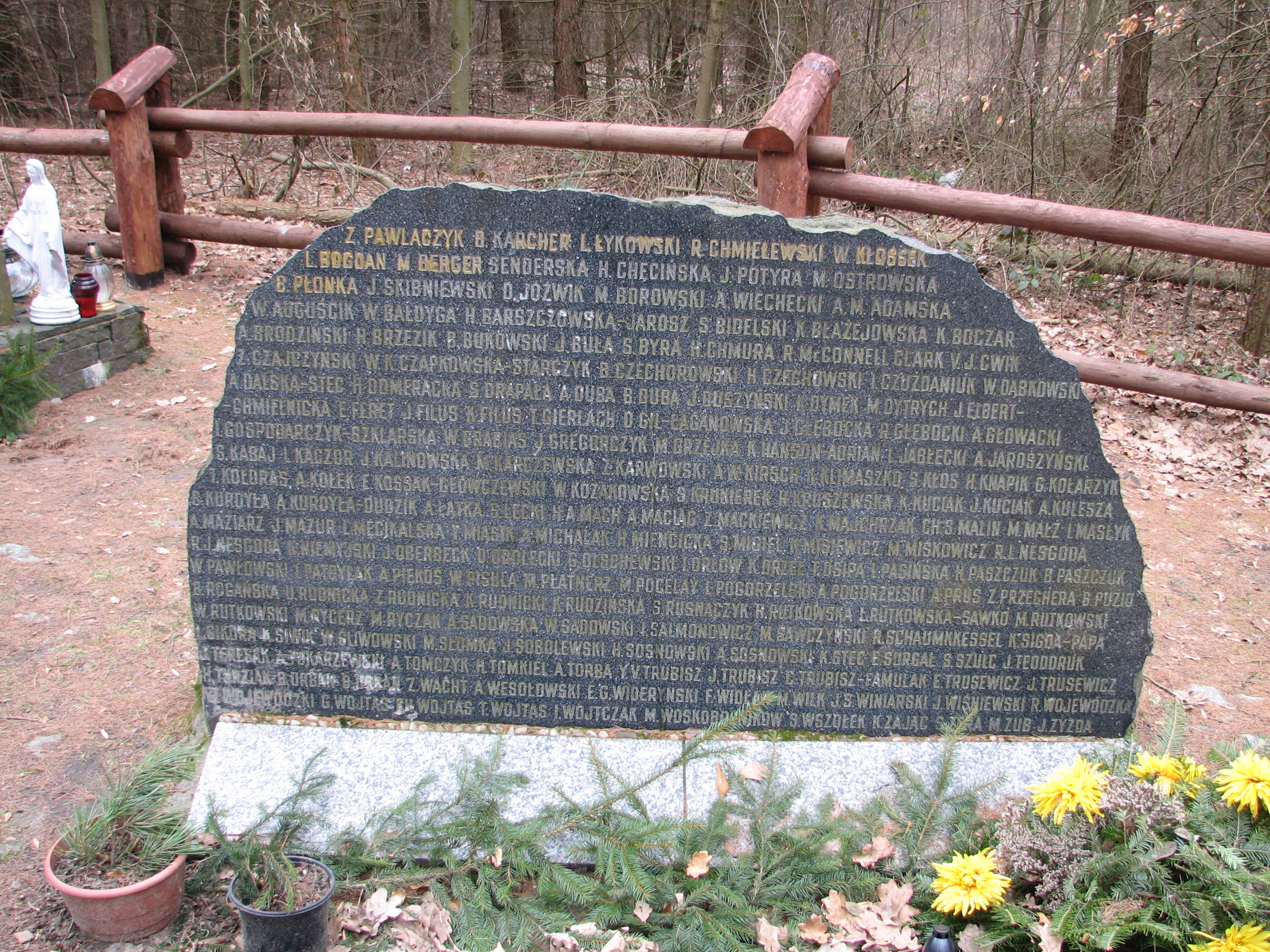
Monument to the victims of the 9 May 1987 crash of the airplane Tadeusz Kościuszko

A point of interest, at the Woods' edge, is a historic forester's lodge built in 1890.

Southeast of the Woods is the Wilanów-district community of Powsin, with two popular attractions: a culture park, and a Botanical Garden of the Polish Academy of Sciences.

Near the western edge of the Kabaty Woods is a monument to the victims of the 9 May 1987 crash of the airplane Tadeusz Kościuszko.

Located in the Kabaty Woods is the facility of the Air Operations Center and of its subordinate unit, the 21 Command and Guidance Center. These are responsible, respectively, for the air defense of Poland and of its capital, Warsaw. The facility is a multi-story underground command and analysis center. A plaque at the entrance states that, before World War II, Germany's Enigma ciphers were broken there. The Polish General Staff's Cipher Bureau, which had been breaking the German ciphers at the General Staff Building (the Saxon Palace) since late 1932, had been transferred to the Kabaty Woods facility in 1937.

== See also ==
- Cipher Bureau
- Kabaty
- Kabaty metro station
