= Wąwozowa Street, Warsaw =

Street in Warsaw, Poland

Coordinates: 52.1312°N 21.0657°E

Wąwozowa
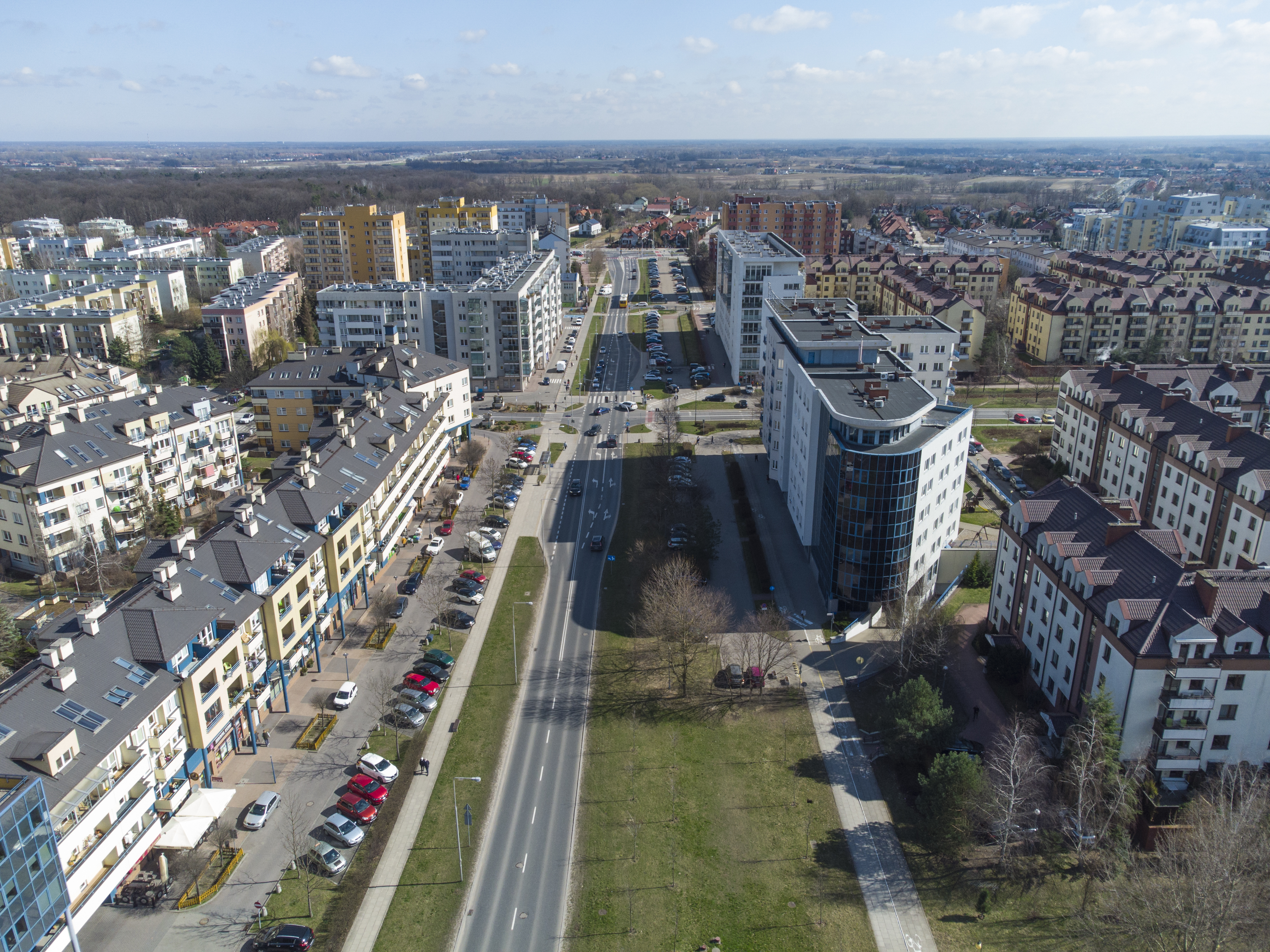
- Interactive map of Wąwozowa
- Length: 1.3 km (0.81 mi)
- Location: Warsaw
- East end: Rosoła Street
- West end: Stryjeńskich Street

Construction
- Inauguration: 1980s

The Wąwozowa Street (Polish: Ulica Wąwozowa) is one of the principal streets of the Warsaw's residential neighborhood of Kabaty in the Ursynów district. It runs along the east–west axis, linking the Rosoła Street with the Stryjeńskich Street. The name comes from gorges (Polish: wąwozy) bordering escarpment of the Vistula, and was given in 1978 by the National Council of the Capital City of Warsaw resolution.

The street was charted in 1980s during the development of Kabaty. Since 1995, the Kabaty metro station has been located beneath the street. There are two traffic lights – first one on the junction with the Komisji Edukacji Narodowej Avenue, and the second one with the Jerzy Zaruba Street (Polish: Ulica Jerzego Zaruby).

There is a cycle path along the road.
