= János Esterházy Memorial =

Monument in Warsaw, Poland

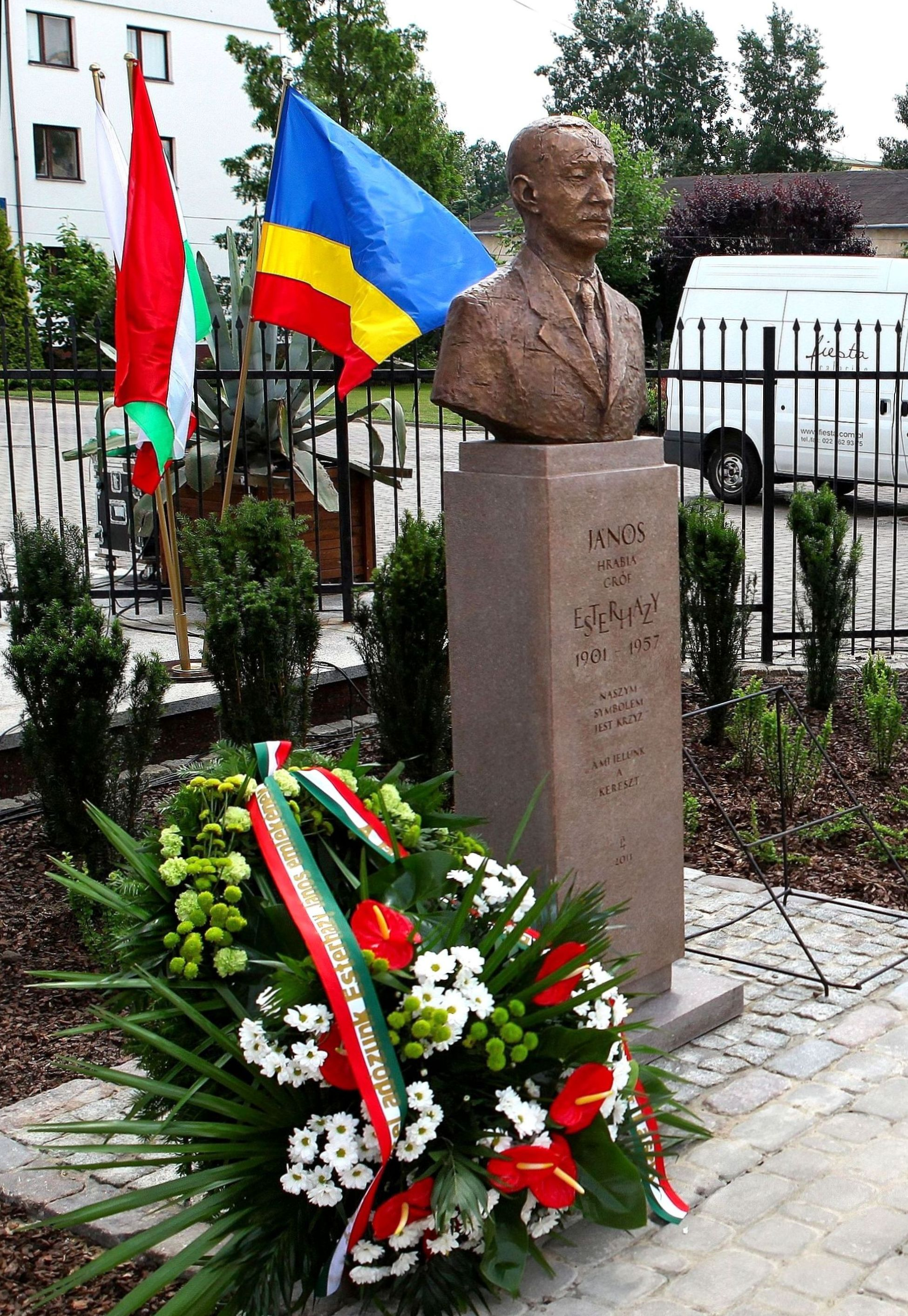
- The moment in 2011.
- Interactive map of János Esterházy Memorial
- Location: 3 Przy Bażantarni Street, Ursynów, Warsaw, Poland
- Coordinates: 52°08′17″N 21°04′01″E
- Designer: János Blaskó
- Opening date: June 15, 2011; 15 years ago
- Dedicated to: János Esterházy

The János Esterházy Memorial (Note: Hungarian pronunciation: [ˈjaː.noʃ ˈɛst.ɛr.haː.zi]; Polish: Pomnik Jánosa Esterházyego; Hungarian: Esterházy János emlékműve) is a monumenin Warsaw, Poland, placed in front of the Blessed Ladislas of Gielniów Church at 3 Przy Bażantarni Street, within the Ursynów district. It is dedicated to János Esterházy, a 20th-century politician from Czechoslovakia, and activist for Hungarian minority in Sloviakia.

The monument is a gift from Hungary to Warsaw. The author of the bust is the Hungarian sculptor János Blaskó.

The monument was unveiled on June 15, 2011 in front of The Church of Blessed Ladislas of Gielniów in the presence of, among others of the Speaker of the Hungarian National Assembly, László Kövér.
