= Latoszki =

Neighbourhood of Warsaw, Poland

- Neighbourhood
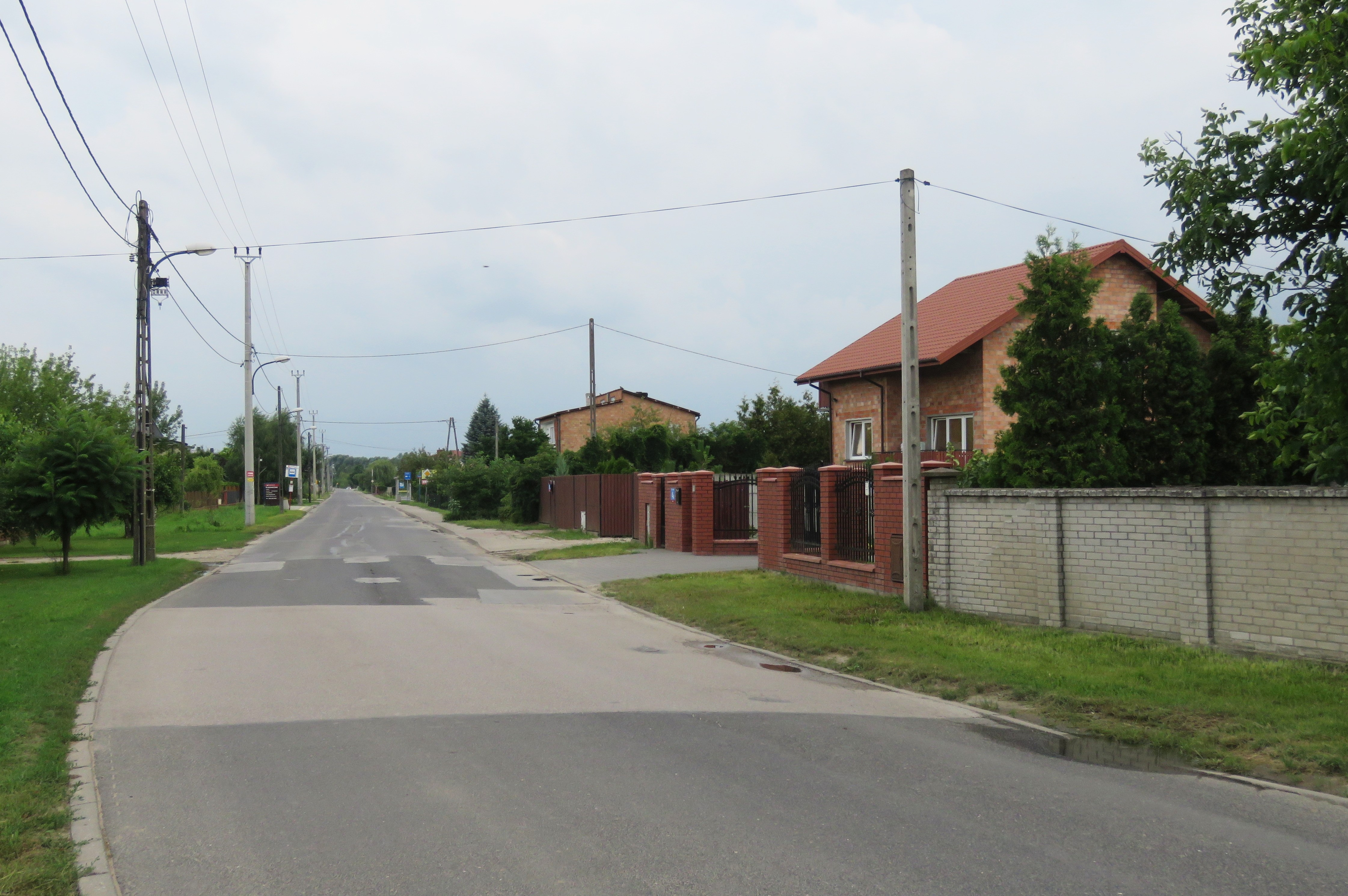
- Houses on Rosochata Street in Latoszki in 2017.
- Interactive map of Latoszki
- Coordinates: 52°08′02″N 21°07′40″E
- Country: Poland
- Voivodeship: Masovian
- City and county: Warsaw
- District: Wilanów
- CIS area: Powsin
- Time zone: UTC+1 (CET)
  - Summer (DST): UTC+2 (CEST)
- Area code: +48 22

Latoszki (Polish: [laˈtɔʂ.ki]) is a neighbourhood is Warsaw, Poland, within the Wilanów district. It is a residential are with low-rise single-family housing. The neighbourhood is located around Latoszki and Ruczaj Streets, within the southeast portion of the City Information System area of Powsin.

== History ==
The first records of Latoszki, then a small village, date to the 16th century. In 1827, it had 43 inhabitants in 5 households, in 1905, 83 inhabitants in 8 households, and in 1921, 65 inhabitants in 10 households. In 1864, serfdom was abolished in Poland, including population of Latoszki. In 1867, the village was incorporated into the municipality of Wilanów. The village was incorporated into the city of Warsaw on 15 May 1951.
