= Przy Bażantarni Street, Warsaw =

Street in Warsaw, Poland

Przy Bażantarni
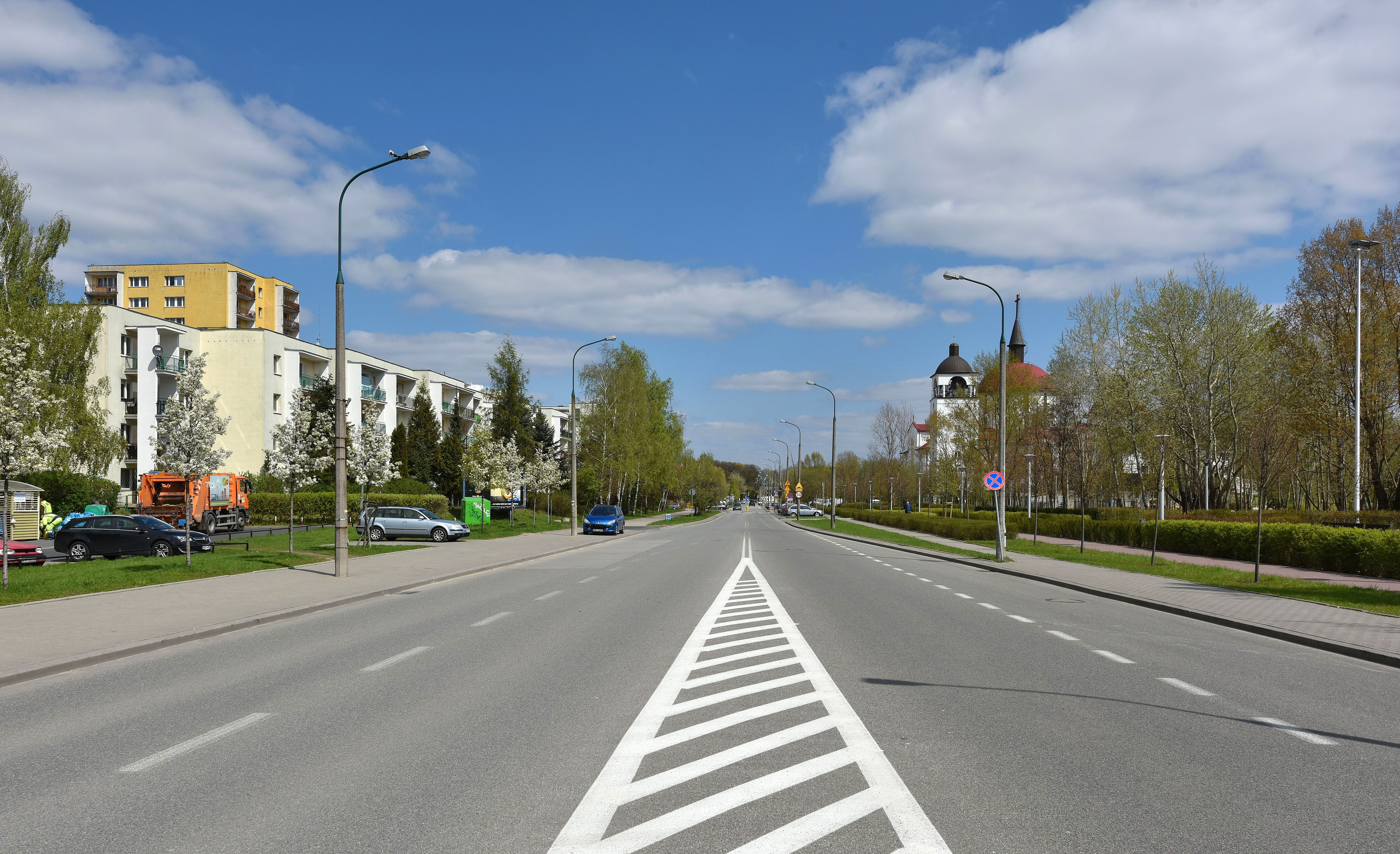
- Length: 1.4 km (0.87 mi)
- Location: Warsaw
- East end: Rosoła Street
- West end: Stryjeńskich Street

Przy Bażantarni Street (Polish: Ulica Przy Bażantarni) is a street in the Ursynów district of Warsaw, Poland.

== History ==
The name of the street originates from a pheasantry (Polish: bażanciarnia), an object that no longer exists, established during the reign of King John III Sobieski to enhance hunting activities, alongside a zoo.

Between 1780 and 1782, August Czartoryski constructed a neoclassical palace on the site of the former pheasantry, designed by Szymon Bogumił Zug. The palace underwent numerous reconstructions, and in the 19th century, its name was changed from Bażantarnia to Natolin in honor of Natalia Potocka.

== More important objects ==
- The Church of Blessed Ladislas of Gielniów (3 Przy Bażantarni Street), erected in 1988
- János Esterházy Monument (3 Przy Bażantarni Street)
- A complex of sports facilities built as part of the Orlik 2012 program (a football field and a multi-functional volleyball and basketball field with a sanitary and changing room building; opened on December 12, 2008, the cost of the 1.5-month construction was PLN 2 million). On March 2, 2010, Polish and Hungarian delegations, headed by Prime Ministers Donald Tusk and Gordon Bajnai, played on this pitch;
- Przy Bażantarni Park (between Przy Bażantarni and Jeżewskiego Streets), established in 2008–2011.
