= Moczydełko Park =

Urban park in Warsaw, Poland

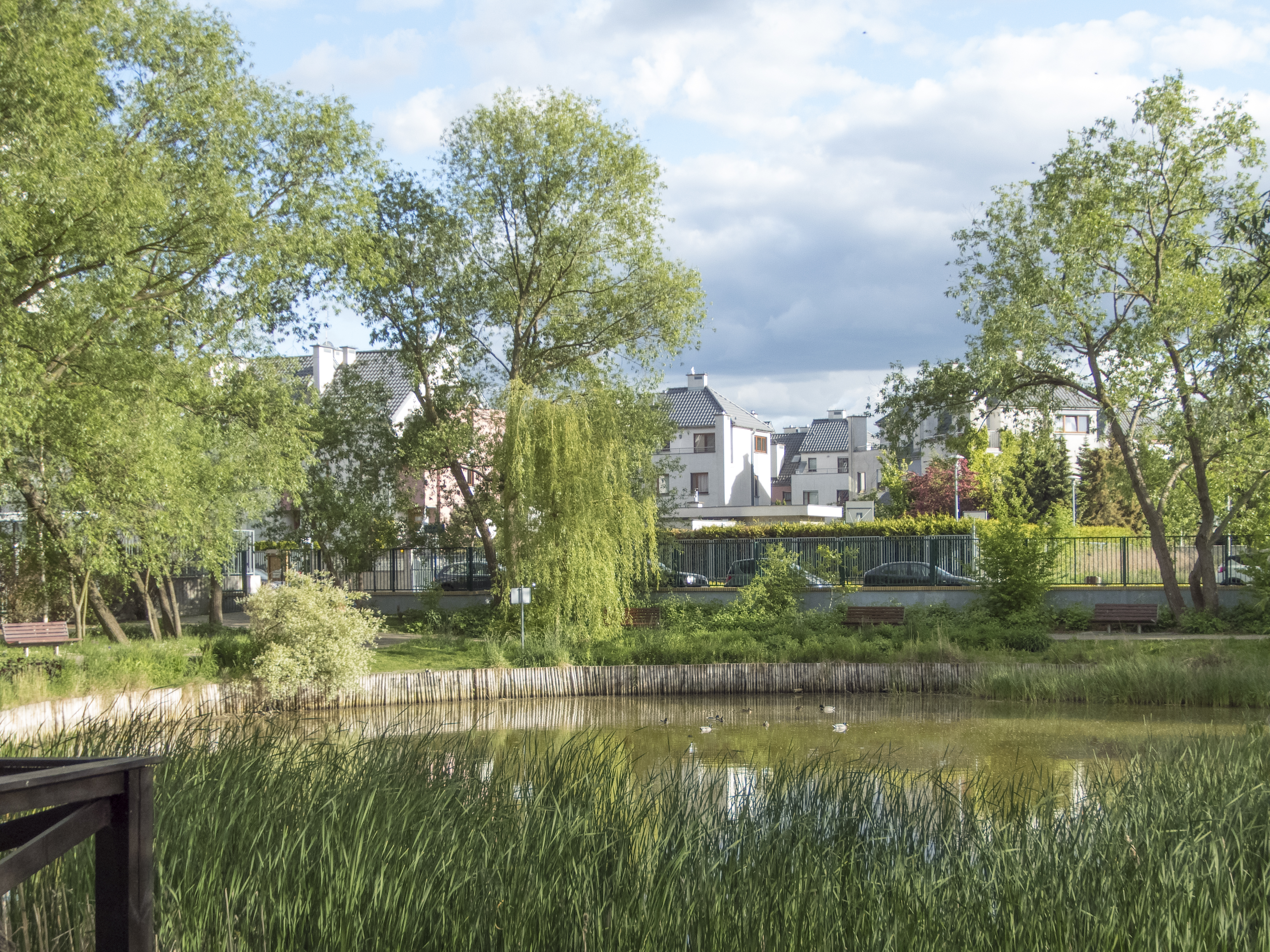
- The pond Moczydło 3 in the park in 2020.
- Interactive map of Moczydełko Park
- Type: Urban park
- Location: Ursynów, Warsaw, Poland
- Coordinates: 52°07′55″N 21°03′15″E
- Area: 0.83 hectares (2.1 acres)
- Created: 2009

The Moczydełko Park (Polish pronunciation: [mɔˈt͡ʂɘ̟.dɛw.kɔ]; Polish: Park Moczydełko) is an urban park in Warsaw, Poland, within the district of Ursynów, between Wełniana Street and Stryjeńskich Street. It was opened in 2009.

== History ==
The park was developed around the pond Moczydło 3, and opened in 2009. In 2011 it was named the Moczydełko Park.

== Characteristics ==
The park is located in the neighbourhood of Natolin, within the district of Ursynów, between Wełniana Street and Stryjeńskich Street. It has the total area of 0.83 ha. There is also the source of the Grabów Cannal.
