= Culture park =

Culture park (Polish: park kulturowy), in Poland, is a designation in the heritage register for cultural landscape-level objects of cultural heritage in Poland.

As of 2026, the National Heritage Board of Poland listed 49 culture parks. However, the number is indecisive, because local communes have no obligation to report the establishment of cultural parks. A culture park considered especially valuable may become a Historic Monument, a special area or even be included on the UNESCO Heritage List.

In 2023, a culture park in Łódź (Park Kulturowy ulicy Piotrkowskiej w Łodzi) was deestablished, which was the first deestablishment of such an object in history.
