= Stryjeńskich Street, Warsaw =

Street in Warsaw, Poland

Coordinates: 52.1366°N 21.0502°E

Stryjeńskich
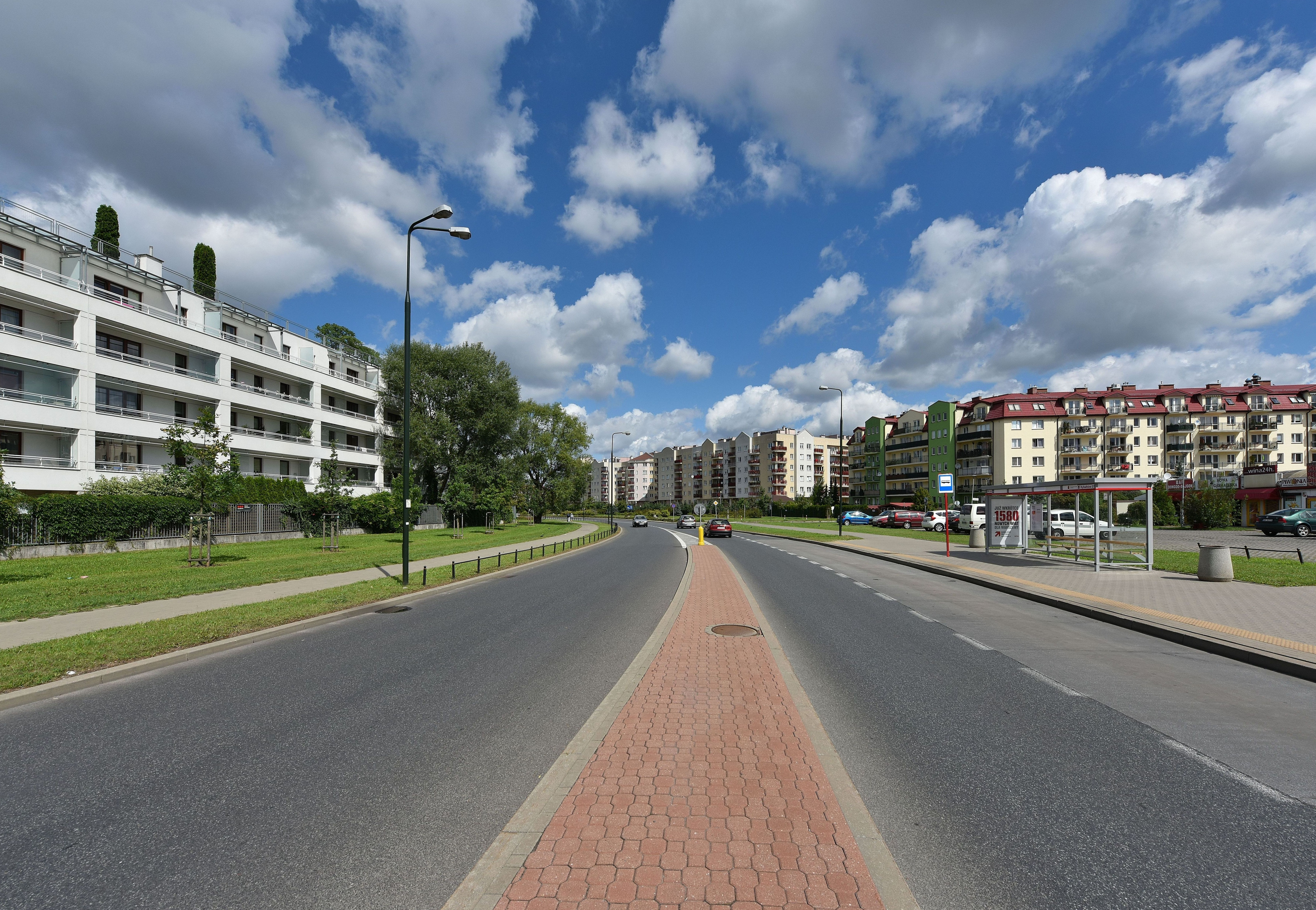
- Length: 1.5 km (0.93 mi)
- Location: Warsaw
- East end: Wąwozowa Street
- West end: Płaskowickiej Street

Construction
- Inauguration: =1970s

Stryjeńskich Street (Polish: ulica Stryjeńskich) is one of the three main thoroughfares of Warsaw's borough of Ursynów. It links Płaskowickiej Street on the north with Wąwozowa Street on the west. The name commemorates the Stryjeński family: Zofia, Aleksander, Karol and Tadeusz. The street was planned in the 1970s and opened ten years later – the name of the avenue appears on the Warsaw maps in 1980. The name of the street was given in 1977. Nowadays, it crosses local streets: Przy Bażantarni, Małej Łąki, Moczydłowska, Belgradzka, Kazury and Na Uboczu.

In 2015, the street was designed to be blinkered to the only pass in the both directions between Przy Bażantarni and Belgradzka Streets. Additionally, it was proposed to install two pedestrian crossings. However, the project, submitted as part of the Participatory Budgeting initiative, sparked controversy and was ultimately rejected by the Ursynów authorities. Nearby the street there are located: the local Moczydełko Park, two churches and one primary school (in the vicinity of the cross with the Na Uboczu Street).
