= Powsin =

Neighbourhood in Warsaw, Poland

- Neighbourhood and City Information System area
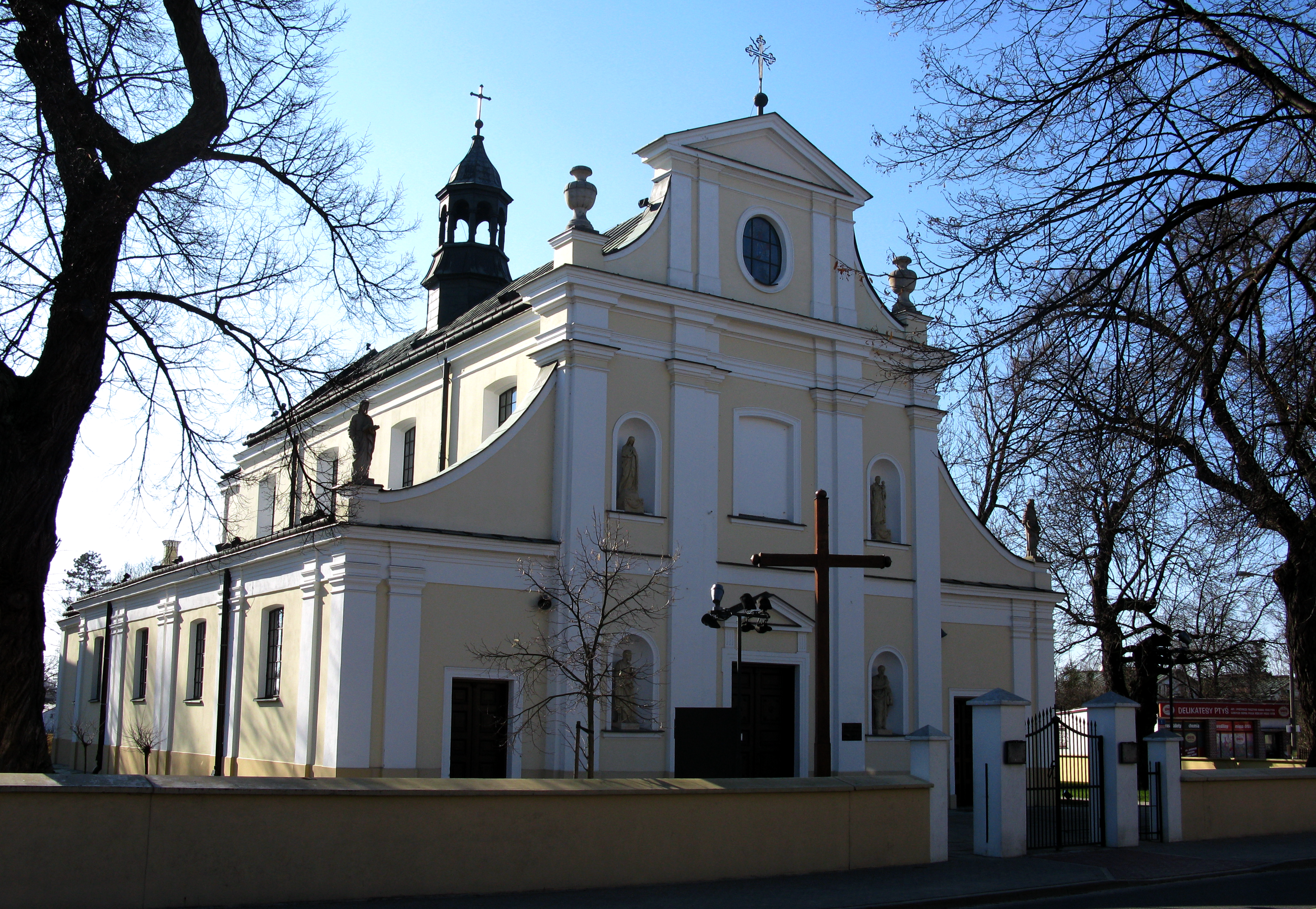
- The St. Elizabeth Church in Powsin
- Interactive map of Powsin
- Coordinates: 52°07′33″N 21°06′09″E
- Country: Poland
- Voivodeship: Masovian
- City and county: Warsaw
- District: Wilanów
- Time zone: UTC+1 (CET)
  - Summer (DST): UTC+2 (CEST)
- Area code: +48 22

Powsin (Polish pronunciation: [ˈpɔf.ɕin]) is a neighbourhood, and an area of the City Information System, in Warsaw, Poland, within the district of Wilanów. It is a residential area with single-family housing.

Powiat was founded in the 13th century as a farm community. Throughout the centuries there also developed settlements of Kępa Latoszkowa, Latoszki, Lisy, and Zamość. In the 18th century, there was constructed the St. Elizabeth Church. The area was incorporated into Warsaw in 1951.

== History ==
The oldest known records of Powsin, then known as Powsino date to 13th century. It was a farming community owned by Bogusza Miecławic of the clan of Doliwa, the voivode of Łęczyca. In 1258, he gave its ownership to the St. John the Baptist Archcathedral in Wrocław, which was later approved by duke Siemowit I, ruler of the Duchy of Masovia. In 1283, bishop Albertus gave the settlement to Mokołaj Ciołek, the castellan of Wizna, in exchange for Szawłowice near Gniezno. In 1398, Elżbieta Ciołkowska, widow after Andrzej Ciołek, castellan of Czersk, founded in Powsin the construction the St. Andrew the Apostle and St. Elizabeth. In 1410, it became a seat of a new parish. The wooden building most likely was burned down during the Northern War in the 1650s.

In the 15th century, in the area was also founded the village of Lisy, and in the 16th century, Latoszki.

The descendants of the Ciołek family adopted surname Powsiński, and owned the village intol 1677, when it was sold to king John III Sobieski, ruler of the Polish–Lithuanian Commonwealth, whom incorporated it into the Wilanów Estate. It was later bought by Elżbieta Helena Sieniawska in 1720s, whom in 1725, founded the construction of the St. Elizabeth Church. Between 1803 and 1815, its parson was Jan Paweł Woronicz, who would later become the primate of Poland. In 1720, nearby was also founded a cemetery.

In 1831, in the area was founded the village of Kępa Latoszkowa. By the 19th century, there was also present Zamość.

Following the abolition of serfdom in 1864, Powsin and surrounding it were incorporated into the municipality of Wilanów.

In 1896, in Powsiny was opened a narrow-gauge railway station of the Wilanów Railway, at the line connecting Mokotów and Piaseczno, and later extended to Klarysew. On 16 July 1939, a two trains collided with each other in Powsin, resulting in deaths of 10 people, and over 200 being injured.

In 1938, the Polski Country Club bought a 50-hectare-area to the east of Powsiny, from count Adam Branicki to build a golf course. In the 1940s, during the occupation of Poland in the Second World War, it was turned into farmland. In 1947, the land was donated to the city of Warsaw, to establish a recreational area, which became the Powsin Culture Park. Currently, it is part of the City Information System area of Skarpa Powsińska.

On 26 September 1943, during the Second World War, the Polish Underground State carried out in Kępa Latoszkowa a portion of the Operation Wilanów, targeting German settlers in the village. As a result, four building were burned down, and twelve people assassinated, including three officers of the Blue Police, as well as the family and coworkers of August Friedrich Boraun, the local leader of the Nazi Party.

In 1945, in Przyczółkowa Street was opened the Powsin Warsaw Insurgents Cemetery, the oldest necropolis dedicated to the veterans of the Warsaw Uprising.

On 15 May 1951, the Powsiny and surrounding it area were incorporated into Warsaw, becoming part of the district of Mokotów. In 1994, the area became part of new district of Wilanów, with a small portion to the west of Opieńki Street becoming part of Ursynów, now forming the neighbourhood of Skarpa Powsińska.

In 1974, to the east of Powsiny was established the Polish Academy of Sciences Botanical Garden and Powsin Centre for Biological Diversity Conservation, with an area of 40 ha. It was developed between 1978 and 1990. It also incorporated the Janówek Villa, and its gardens, dating to 1913. Currently, it is part of the City Information System area of Skarpa Powsińska.

In 2006, Wilanów was subdivided into eight areas of the City Information System, a municipal standardized system of street signage, with Powsin becoming one of them.

== Overview ==
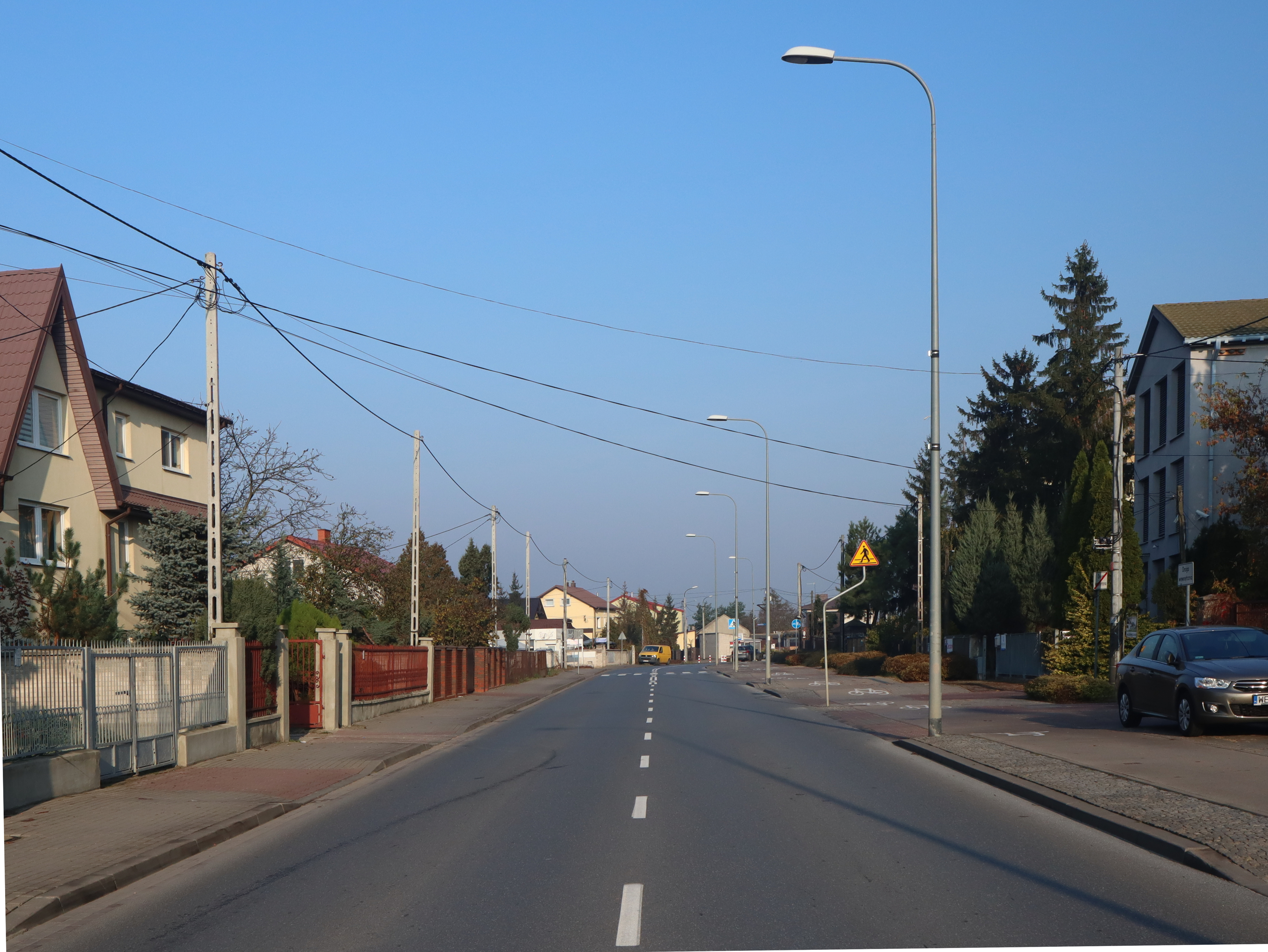
Single-family housing in Powsin at Przyczółkowa Street

The area features low-rise single-family housing and farmlands, with neighbourhoods of Powsin, Kępa Latoszkowa, Latoszki, Lisy, Stare Kabaty, and Zamość.

At 31 Przyczółkowa Street stands the Catholic St. Elizabeth Church, dating to the 18th century. Within the neighbourhood are also located two small necropoli. Nearby are also placed the Powsin Cemetery and the Warsaw Insurgents Cemetery.

The area includes lakes Lisy, Pod Morgami, Struga, and Torfowiska, as well as ditches Latoszka, Natolin, and Powsin.
