= Baszta Soldiers Memorial =

Monument in Warsaw, Poland

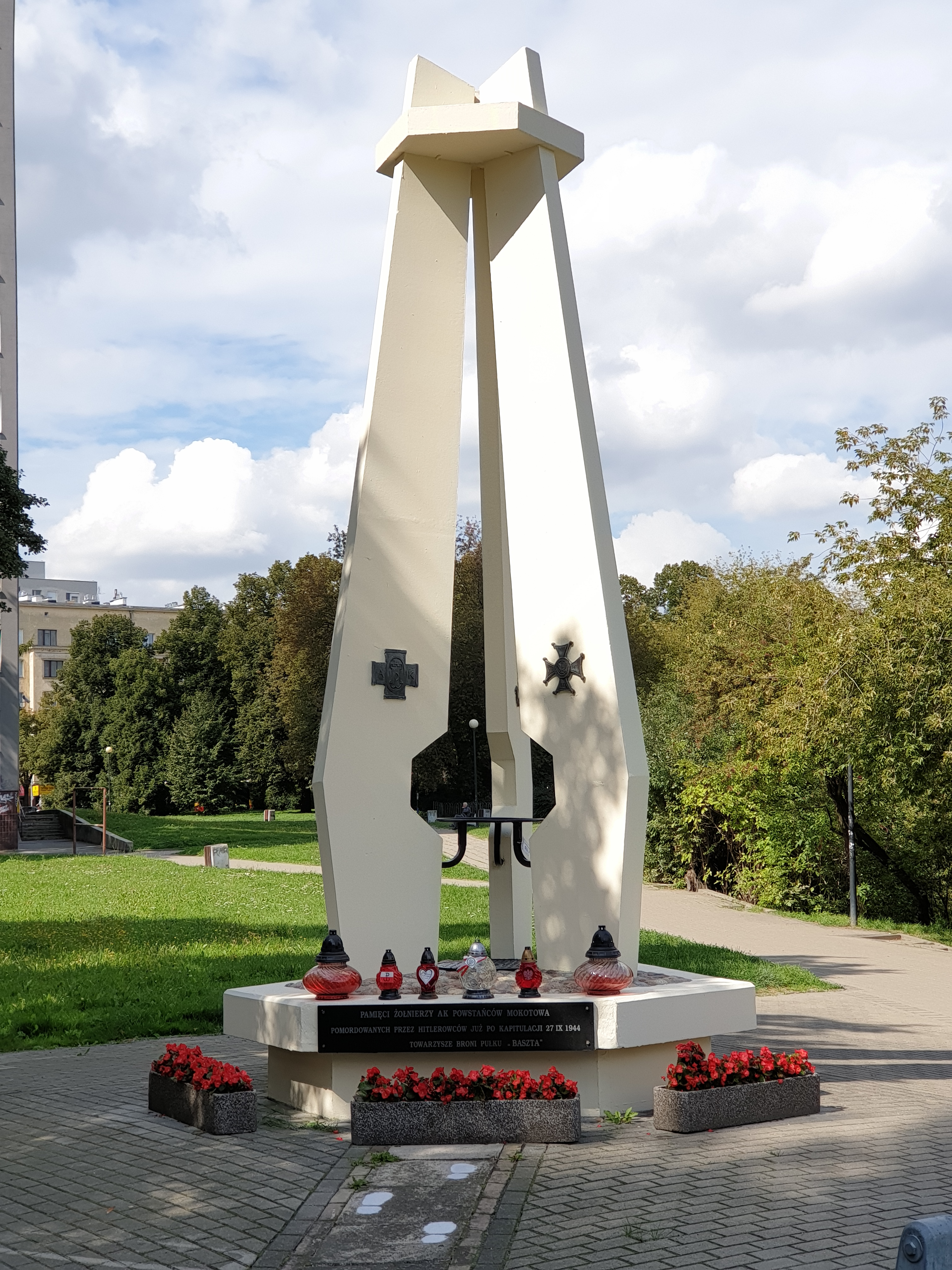
- The memorial in 2018.
- Interactive map of Baszta Soldiers Memorial
- Location: Dworkowa Street, Mokotów, Warsaw, Poland
- Coordinates: 52°12′20.6″N 21°01′30.0″E
- Designer: Eugeniusz Ajewski
- Type: Obelisk
- Material: Concrete
- Height: 6 m (19.69 ft)
- Opening date: 27 September 1984
- Dedicated to: Victims of the execution at Dworkowa Street of 1944

The Baszta Soldiers Memorial (Polish pronunciation: [ˈbaʂ.ta]; Polish: Pomnik żołnierzy „Baszty”) is a monument in Warsaw, Poland, located within the neighbourhood of Old Mokotów. It is placed in the Eye of the Sea Park near Dworkowa Street. The monument commemorates around 140 insurgents of the Warsaw Uprising, predominantly the soldiers of the Baszta Regiment Group of the Home Army, executed at the location on 27 September 1944 by the Order Police. It has a form of a concrete obelisk. It was designed by Eugeniusz Ajewski, and unveiled on 27 September 1984.

== History ==
The monument commemorates around 140 insurgents of the Warsaw Uprising, predominantly the soldiers of the Baszta Regiment Group of the Home Army, executed on 27 September 1944 at Dworkowa Street by the Order Police. The insurgents were captured as they attempted to retreat from Mokotów to Downtown through the city sewage network. They were discovered by German officers and forced to resurface on Dworkowa Street, near the headquarters of the Gendarmerie of the Order Police for the Warsaw District.

The memorial was unveiled on 27 September 1984 on the 40th anniversary of the execution, in the Eye of the Sea Park near Dworkowa Street. The sculpture was designed by Eugeniusz Ajewski, and manufactured by the Żerańska Fabryka Elementów Betoniarskich Faelbet (Faelbet Żerań Concrete Components Factory). The money for its construction was raised by the Society of Fighters for Freedom and Democracy. Aleksander Kowalewski, a soldier of the Baszta Regiment Group, and a survivor of the execution, was one of the main propagators of the memorial, and became the first person to light a grave candle near it during the unveiling ceremony.

== Characteristics ==
The memorial is placed in the Eye of the Sea Park near Dworkowa Street. It is located next to the manhole cover of the sewage entrance from which Polish soldiers were forced to resurface during their capture, and near their place of execution. The sculpture is made from concrete and measures 6 meters (19.69 ft). It has a form of an obelisk, with a hexagonal pedestal, topped with three irregularly-shaped pylons, joined at the top with a hexagonal plate. They are decorated with three bronze wall sculptures, depicting the War Order of Virtuti Militari, the badge of the Baszta Regiment Group, and the Anchor symbol. The top of the pedestal is paved with stones, featuring a symbolic sewage manhole cover in its centre. Additionally, a trail of footprints painted in white paint leads from a nearby sewer manhole cover to the monument. The pedestal also bears a brass plaque with an inscription in Polish, which reads:

Polish inscription

Pamięci żołnierzy AK – powstańców Mokotowa
pomordowanych przez hitlerowców już po kapitulacji 27 IX 1944
Towarzysze Broni Pułku „Baszta”

Translation:
English translation

In memory of the soldiers of the Home Army, the insurgents of Mokotów
murdered by the Nazis on 27 September 1944, after the capitulation
Comrades in arms of the Baszta Regiment

== Gallery ==
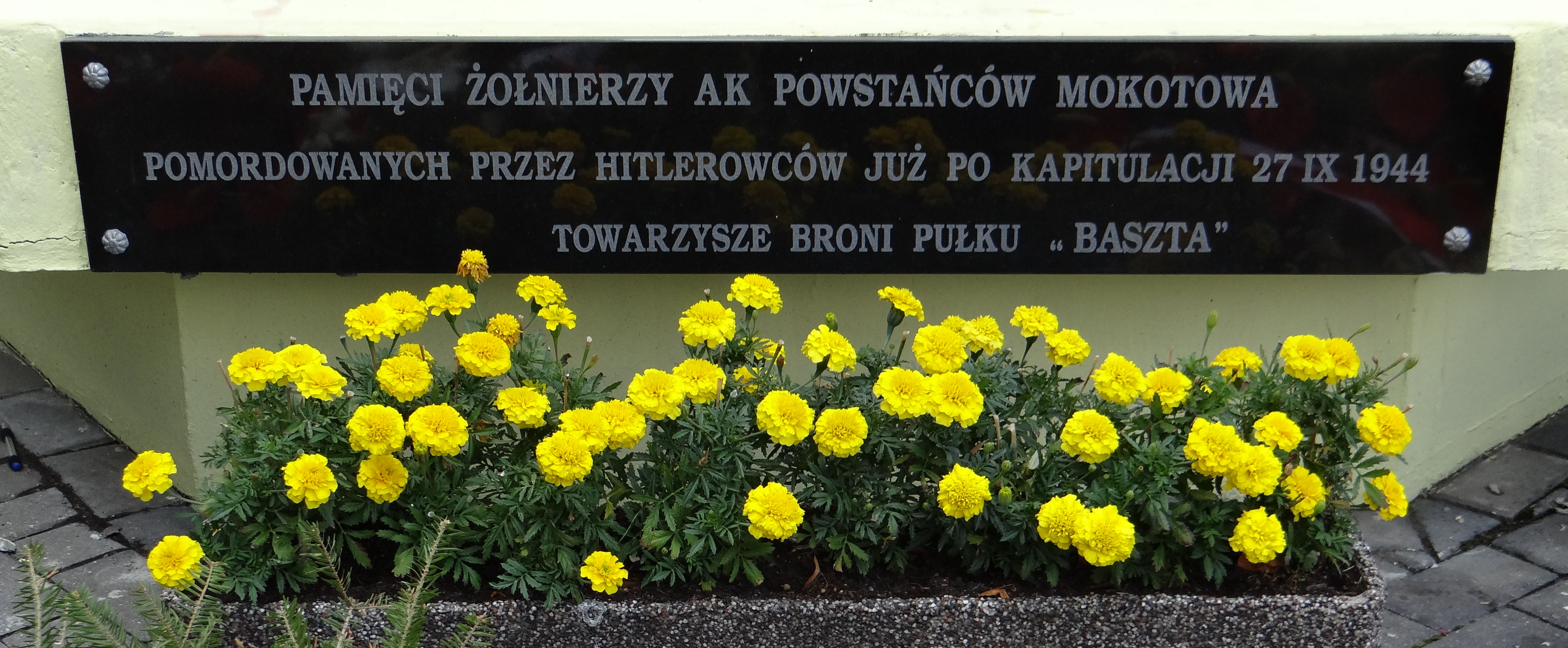
The plaque on the pedestal.

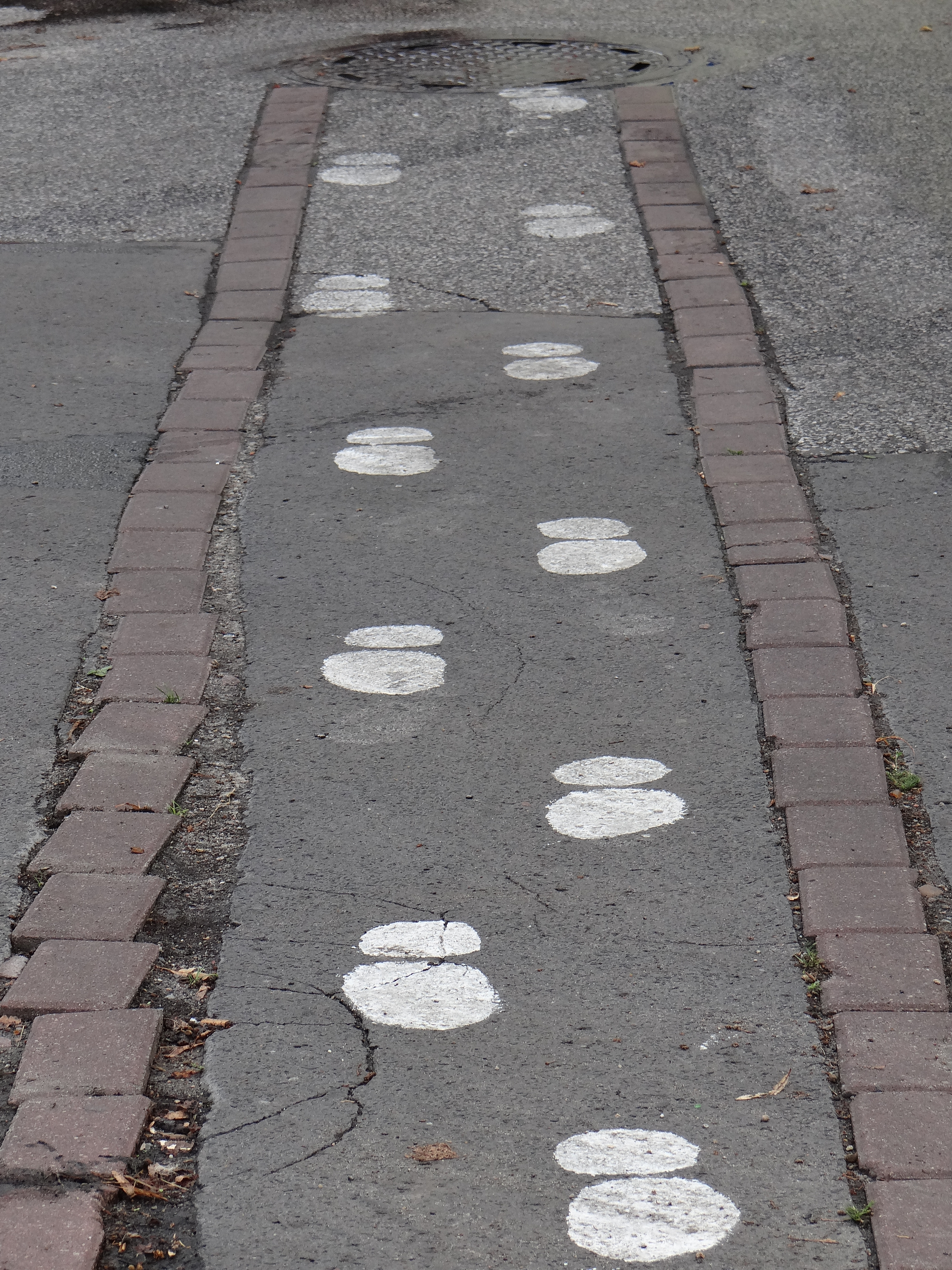
A trail of footstepts, leading from the monument to the nearby sewage manhole cover.

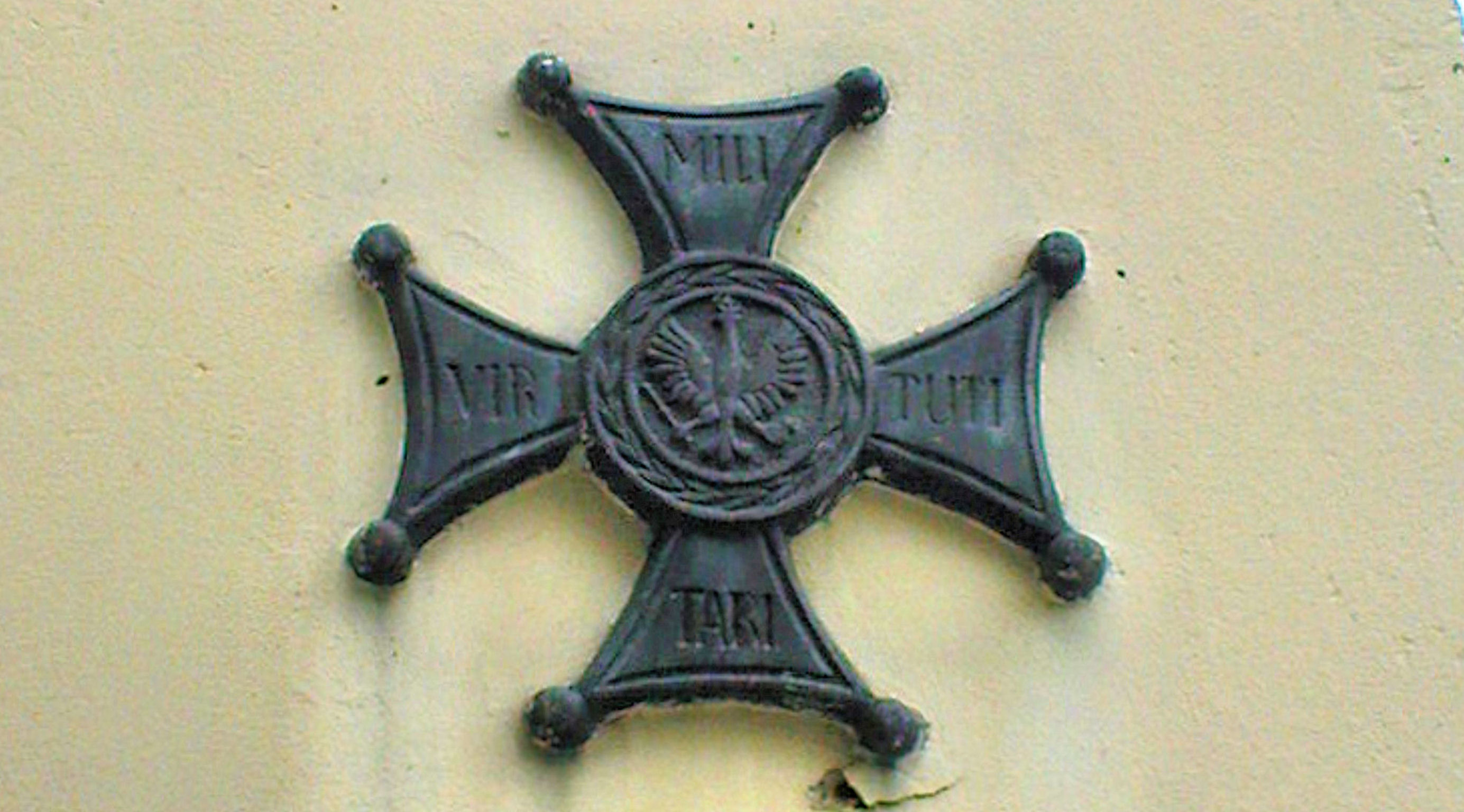
The War Order of Virtuti Militari.

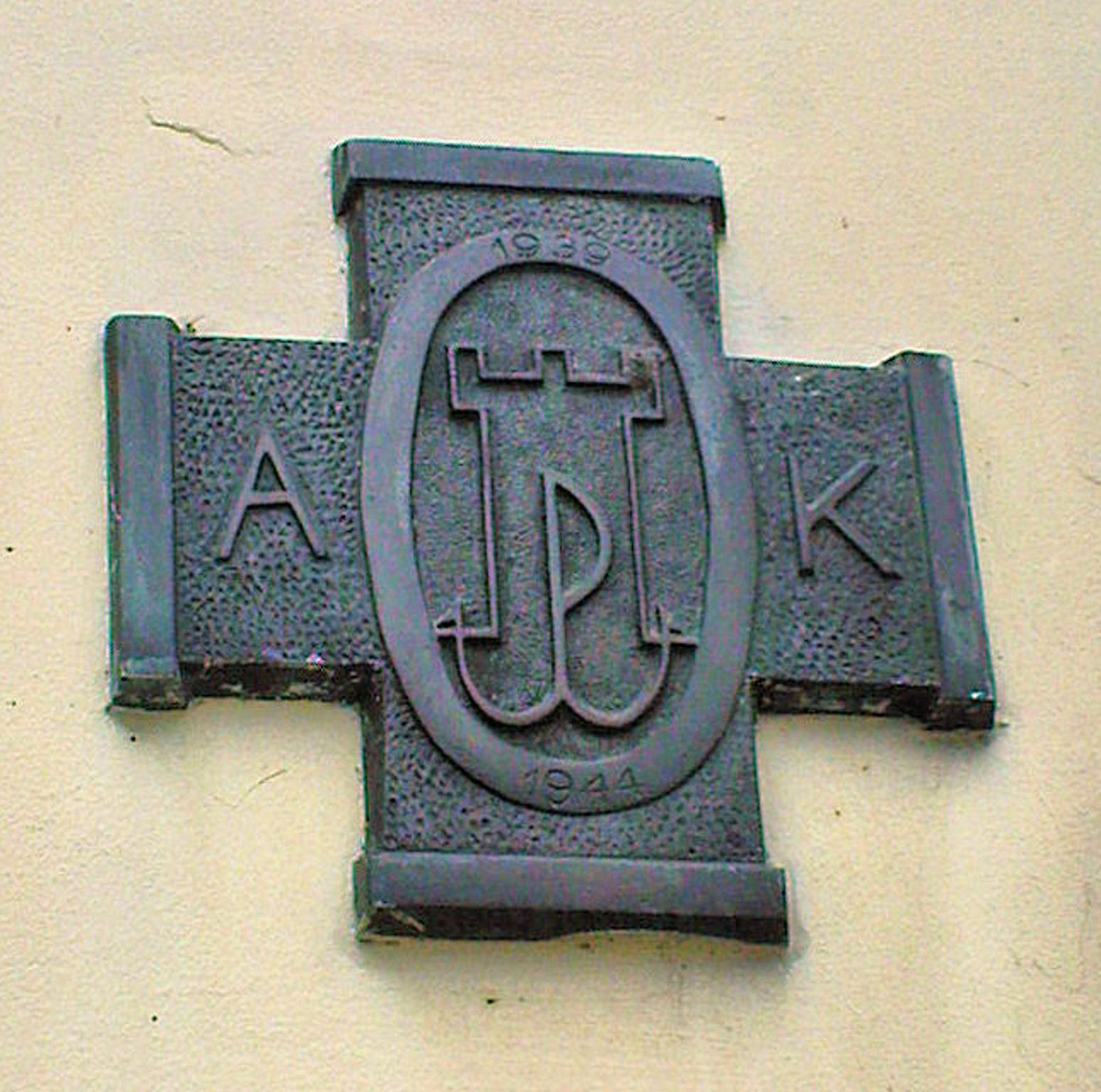
The badge of the Baszta Regiment Group.

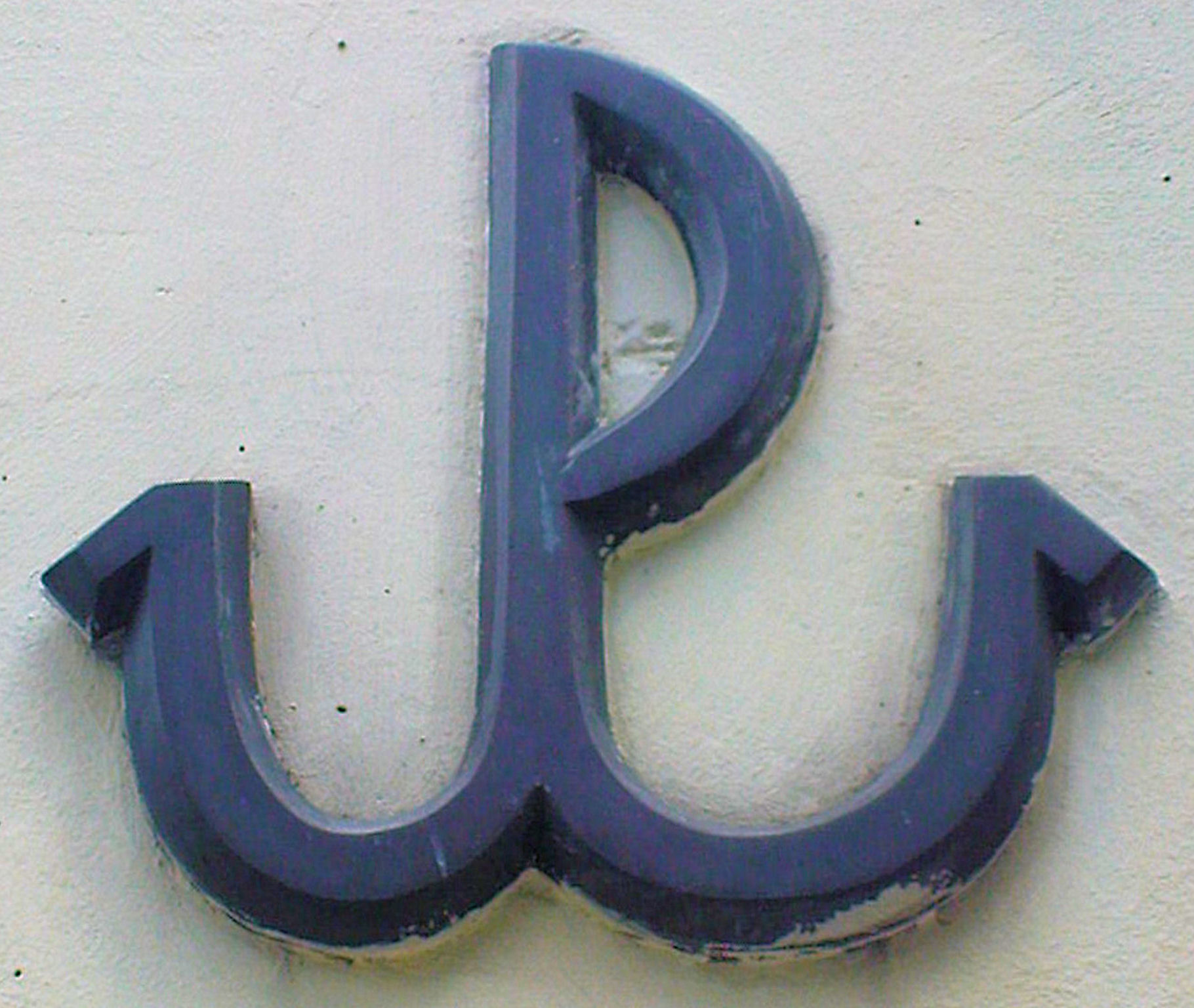
The Anchor symbol.
