= Old Mokotów =

Neighbourhood in Warsaw, Poland

Old Mokotow
- City Information System area (neighbourhood)
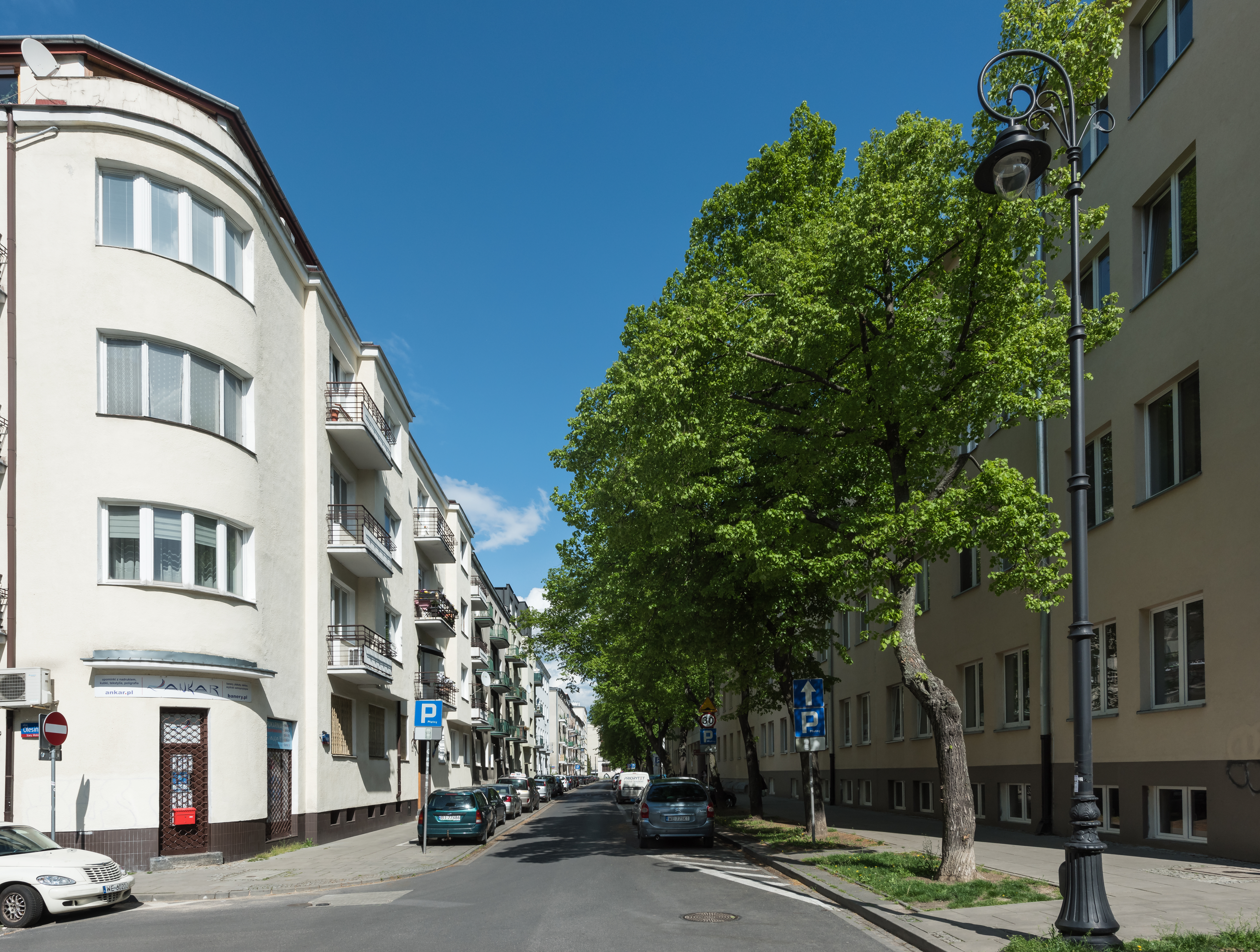
- The apartment buildings on Grażyny Street.

- The location of Old Mokotów within the Mokotów district.
- Coordinates: 52°12′27″N 21°03′04″E
- Country: Poland
- Voivodeship: Masovian
- City and county: Warsaw
- District: Mokotów
- Subdistrict: Upper Mokotów
- Time zone: UTC+1 (CET)
  - Summer (DST): UTC+2 (CEST)
- Area code: +48 22

Old Mokotow (Polish: Stary Mokotów, [ˈsta.rɘ̟ mɔˈkɔ.tuf]) is a neighbourhood, and a City Information System area, in Warsaw, Poland, located within the northwestern portion of the Mokotów district. The area is part of its western half, known as the Upper Mokotów. The neighbourhood is a residential area, predominantly consisting of mid- and high-rise apartment buildings. Old Mokotów also includes the campuses of the SGH Warsaw School of Economics and the Warsaw University of Technology. The neighbourhood has several historic buildings, including the Szuster Palace, a Gothic Revival palace residence from 1774, and the Mokotów Tollhouses, two neoclassical tollhouse pavilions from 1818. It also features the Church of the Ascension of the Lord from 1904, which belongs to the Lutheran denomination. The neighbourhood is also served by the M1 line of the Warsaw Metro underground rapid transit system, with the Racławicka and Pole Mokotowskie stations.

The oldest known records of the village of Mokotów, originally known as Mokotowo, date to 1367, when it was a small farming community. In the 14th century, Mokotów received the Kulm law privileges. It was raided and destroyed by the Swedish Imperial Army in 1656 during and following the siege of Warsaw in the Second Northern War. In the 18th century Mokotów came to prosperity with the development of numerous manor houses, villas, and palaces for wealthy landowners and townspeople. It was demolished and plundered by the soldiers of the Imperial Russian Army during the Kościuszko Uprising in 1794. It began to rebuild in the 1810s. In the 19th century, Mokotów became a popular holiday village, with numerous guesthouses, health and recreation facilities, restaurants and inns developing in the area. On 13 January 1867, the village became the seat of government of the rural municipality of Mokotów. The expansion of the village was halted in the 1880s, with the construction of sets of fortifications to its south in 1883 and 1892. In 1892, the Warsaw Mokotów narrow-gauge station was opened next to the Union of Lublin Square, where it operated until 1935.

At the turn of the 20th century, the land of Mokotów was partitioned and sold for housing development. In the 1910s, following the decommissioning of the nearby fortifications, the area began rapidly developing with the construction of tenement houses, especially alongside Independence Avenue and Puławska Street. The village of Mokotów, together with the rest of its municipality, was incorporated into Warsaw on 8 April 1916. In 1910, the Mokotów Aerodrome was established to the north of the village, featuring dirt runways. It became the city's first aerodrome and operated until 1947. During the Warsaw Uprising in the Second War War, the German officers conducted a series of executions on local population, and displaced thousands of residents from the area. A large portion of the building in the neighbourhood were destroyed during the fighting and in its aftermath, with the neighbourhood redeveloping after the war. Between 1947 and 1952, a housing estate with modernist apartment buildings was developed in its north. Another housing estate, known as Osiedle Batorego, was developed in the southeast in the 1960s. In 1995, the M1 line of the Warsaw Metro was opened crossing the neighbourhood, with the Racławicka and Pole Mokotowskie stations.

== Toponymy ==
The name Mokotów most likely comes from the name of its former owner Mokot or Mokoto, which with addition of the suffix -ów, translates to Mokot's place. A hypothesis proposes the person's name originates from a Middle High German word mocke, meaning "clumsy" and "uneducated". The modern neighbourhood is referred to as Old Mokotów (Polish: Stary Mokotów), as a historical location of the village with said name, within the larger city district of Mokotów.

== History ==
=== Until the 19th century ===
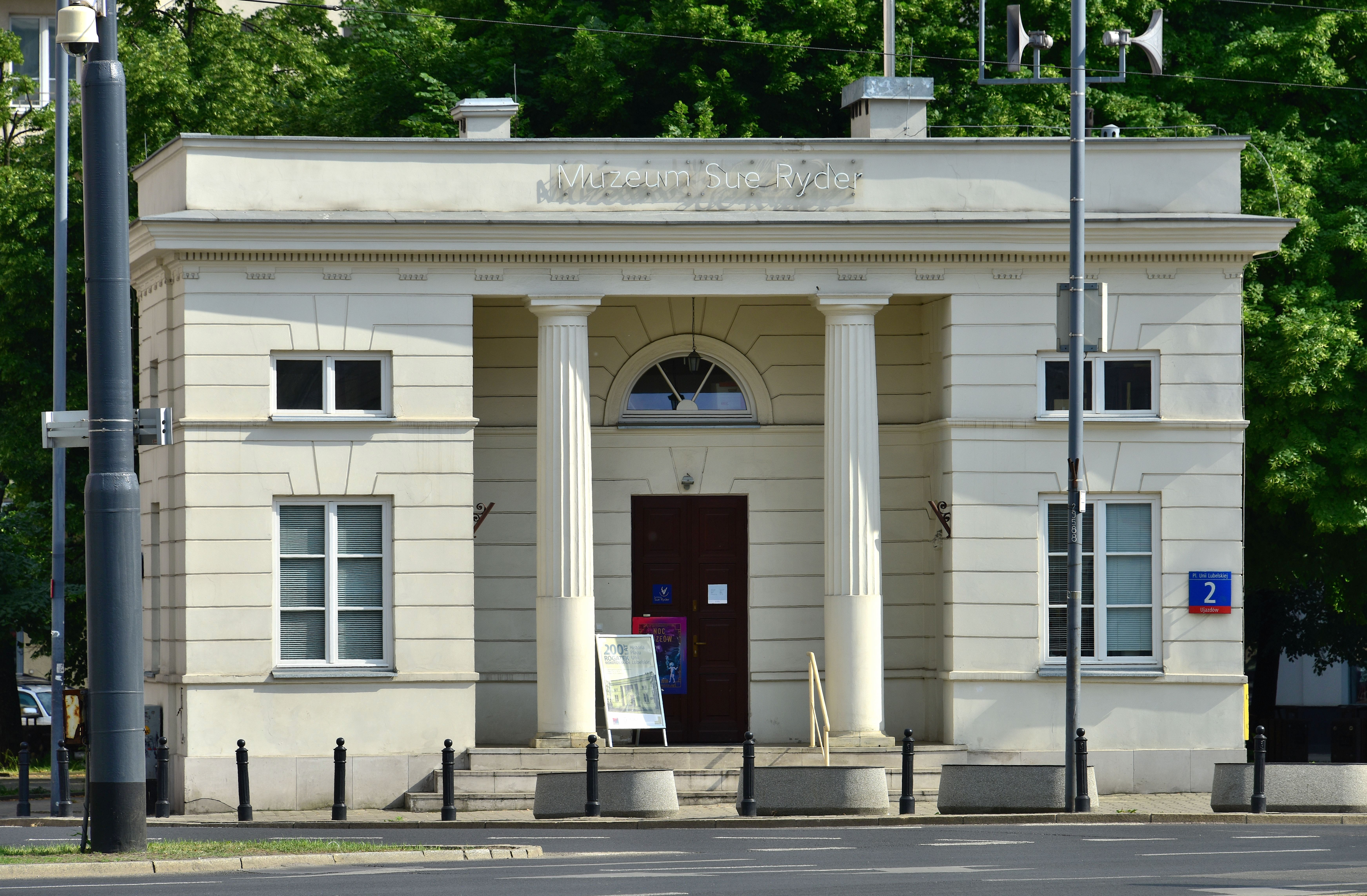
One of two pavilions of the Mokotów Tollhouses, built in 1818.

Several hoes made from animal horns from the Linear Pottery culture, dating to around 2500 BCE, were discovered near Sobieskiego Street, within the area of the modern Old Mokotów.

The oldest known records of Mokotów, originally known as Mokotowo, date to 1367, when it was a small farming community paying tithe to the town of Zegrze. It was placed near a road connecting Warsaw and Czersk, now known as Czerska Street. Its farmlands stretched approximately between current Mokotowska, Polna, Rakowiecka, Odyńca, Żwirki i Wigury, Piaseczyńska, Sobieskiego, and Belwederska Streets, while the village centre was probably originally placed in the area of Boryszewska and Dolna Streets and the Eye of the Sea pond. Some documents from 15th century suggest that a nearby settlement in modern Wierzbno might have been deserted and incorporated into Mokotów.

Probably after the agricultural reform in the 14th century, or even prior to that, Mokotów had been granted the Kulm law privileges and became property of the Duke of Masovia. Its farmlands were managed in the three-field system. The village sold its produce to Jazdów, and after it was destroyed in a 1262 raid by Lithuanians, it switched to serve Warsaw instead. It led to several farmers of Mokotów growing small fortunes, some even having residences on the outskirts of the city, at Senatorska and Długa Streets. In the 13th century, the farmlands of the village had an area of 25 Chełmno voloks, or 420 hectares. It paid a lease of 28 groschen, an equivalent of a bushel of wheat flour or a wheelcart of hay, similar to other villages belonging to the Duke of Masovia. Additionally, each volok of its farmland were taxed with 13 bushels of rye, and customary tributes in the form of 2 capons, one goose and 30 eggs. Three voloks, which, respectively, belonged to the advocate, the vicars of the St. John Archcathedral in Warsaw, and merchant Jerzy Baryczka. In 1611, the later briefly housed Vasili IV, the Tsar of all Russia, and his brother Dmitry Shuisky, while they remained imprisoned by the Polish–Lithuanian Commonwealth.

Mokotów's prosperity ended with the economic decline in the countryside in the early 17th century. Between 1619 and 1620, only its 13 voloks were inhabited, including the three still exempt from taxes. The burden on the remaining farmers in oats, poultry, and eggs was doubled, and in 1645, another volok was established, with payment in the form of military conscription. In 1652, the cultivated area of the village had further decreased to 11 voloks. Mokotów, together with the surrounding it settlements, was raided and destroyed by the Swedish Imperial Army in 1656 during and following the siege of Warsaw in the Second Northern War. In 1661, only five voloks were cultivated. In 1678, a portion Mokotów was acquired by the politician and nobleman Stanisław Herakliusz Lubomirski, together with the nearby Służew and Służewiec. He previously already owned a portion of one of the tax-exempt voloks in the village.

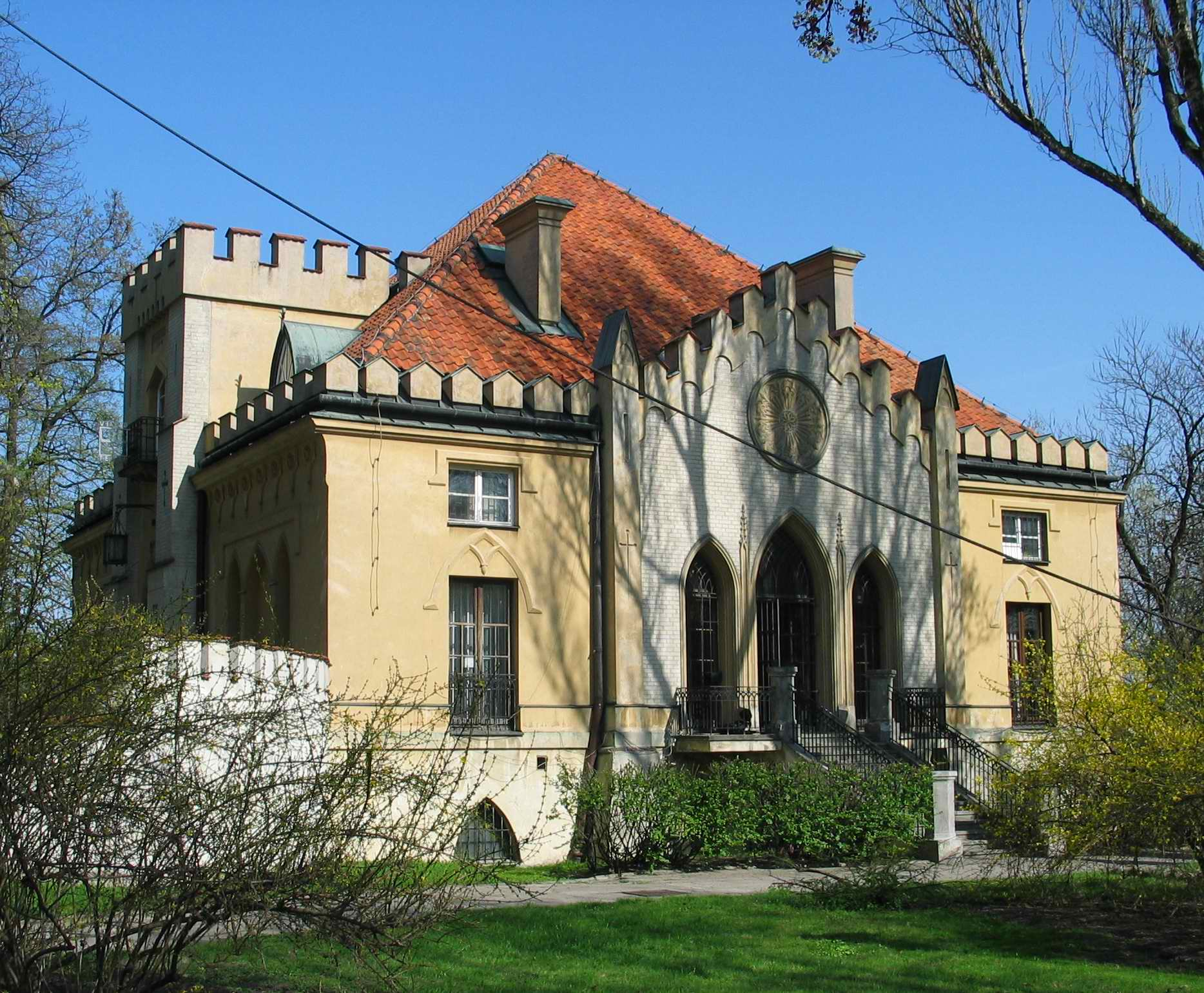
The Szuster Palace, built in 1774.

Between 1768 and 1770, an urban layout of streets, known as the Stanislavian Axis, was developed on the initiative of king Stanisław August Poniatowski. It connected Old Warsaw and its satellite towns, with the Ujazdów Castle. It involved five roundabouts, later developed into urban squares, one of which was the Union of Lublin Square, located to the north of the village of village of Mokotów. In 1770, the Lubomirski Ramparts, a series of dirt ramparts were erected around Warsaw and its satellite towns, to decrease the spread of the plague during its second pandemic. The tollhouses were established at the entrances and exits to the agglomeration, on the roads crossing the rampart lines. One of them was placed at on Union of Lublin Square, with two pavilions placed on both sides of the current Puławska Street. In 1818, the buildings at the square were replaced with two neoclassical pavilions, called the Mokotów Tollhouses. The plague, which was expected to reach the city in 1771, was instead halted by a harsh winter. In 1794, during the Kościuszko Uprising, the ramparts were enforced with cannons placed in front and behind them, forming parts of the city fortifications during the siege of Warsaw the same year. In 1825, the ramparts were renovated, to aid in enforcing duty collection at the city boundaries. The ramparts were removed in 1875, following the abolishment of the duty fees from entiring the city.

The village came back to prosperity again in the 18th century, with the development of numerous manor houses, villas, and palaces for wealthy landowners and townspeople. One of them was the Szuster Palace, built in 1774 for Elżbieta Izabela Lubomirska. In 1779, an extensive garden complex, now forming the Eye of the Sea Park, centred around the lake it was named after, was developed to the east of the residences. Several brickworks were also opened in the area, the largest being founded before 1779, at the Warsaw Escarpment, near the current Skolimowska Street.

=== 19th century and the early 20th century ===
Mokotów was demolished and plundered by the soldiers of the Imperial Russian Army during the Kościuszko Uprising in 1794. It began to rebuild in the 1810s. In the 19th century, Mokotów became a popular holiday village, with numerous guesthouses, health and recreation facilities, restaurants and inns developing in the area. By the end of the century, the garden next to the Szuster Palace was turned into the Promenade amusement park, with a luxury restaurant, circus, and open air there among other attractions. It operated until the outbreak of the First World War, and again, from its end until the beginning of the Second World War.

In 1818, the farmlands to the south of Warsaw were bought by the city, and turned into a military training area, later known as the Mokotów War Field. In around 1825, it became the cavalry drill site. In the first half of the 19th century, a horce racecourse was built at the Mokotów War Field, thanks to the efforts of Ivan Paskevich, the Viceroy of Poland. The first race officially organised by the Kingdom of Poland was held there in 1841. Various races and exhibitions were held at the venue in the following years, until were eventually outlawed in 1861. The ban was lifted in 1880. In 1887, a new venue, the Mokotów Field Racecourse, was built on Polna Street, and in 1895, it hosted the first annual Great Warsaw Race, the most prestigious horse race in Poland. The venue was closed down in 1938, and its events were moved to the Służewiec Racecourse, at Puławska Street.

On 13 January 1867, the village became the seat of government of the rural municipality of Mokotów, as part of the administrative reform in the Kingdom of Poland. It also included the nearby villages.

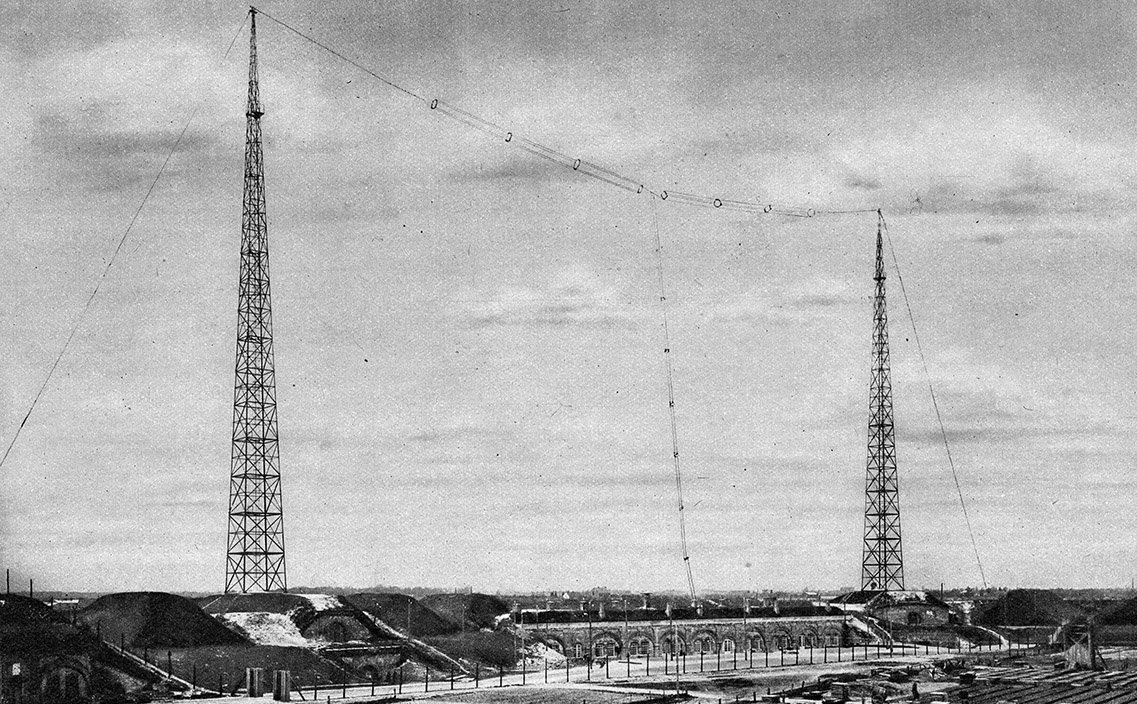
The radio broadcasting stations in Fort M in 1926.

The expansion of the village was halted in the 1880s, with the construction of sets of fortifications to its south, Fort M and Fort M-Che, by the Imperial Russian Army, as part of the Warsaw Fortress, in 1883 and 1892 respectively. They were decommissioned in 1909, and the latter was deconstructed in the 1920s, while Fort M was turned into a broadcasting station of the Polish Radio. The building is currently located within the neighbourhood of Wyględów.

Additionally, since 1875, the Kexholm Life Guard Regiment of the Imperial Russian Army had its barracks in Mokotów, next to the Union of Lublin Square. In 1904, an Eastern Orthodox temple, known as the Sts. Peter and Paul Church, was built nearby for the use by the garrison. Both were abandoned in 1915, with the evacuation of the Russian military from the city, following its capture by the Imperial German Army. In 1920, the temple was renamed to Church of the Ascension of the Lord, and adopted as a garrison church of the Evangelical Church of the Augsburg Confession. Until 1923, it was also used by a parish of the Evangelical Reformed Church. The building was destroyed in 1944 during the Warsaw Uprising in the Second World War. It was rebuilt in 1947, and in 1950, it became seat of a civilian parish of the Evangelical Church of the Augsburg Confession.

In 1881, a tramline connecting Mokotów and Wierzbno was opened with tracks built alongside Puławska Street. It was first operated by a horsecar, and since 1909, by an electric tram. The same year, the Puławska tram deport was opened on Goworka Street. It was closed down in 1955, with the trams being moved to the Mokotów tram depot in Służewiec. In 1892, the Warsaw narrow-gauge station was opened next to the Union of Lublin Square, between Puławska and Chocimska Streets. It was part of two lines operated by the Wilanów Railway. In 1898, a line of the Grójec Commuter Railway was also added. In 1930, the station was renamed to Warsaw Mokotów. It was closed in 1935, and moved further south, to the intersection of Puławska and Odyńca Streets in Wierzbno, where it operated until 1938. In 1935, the station was moved further south, to the intersection of Puławska and Odyńca Streets, where it operated until 1938. In 1897, the village of Mokotów had a population of 7,191 people.

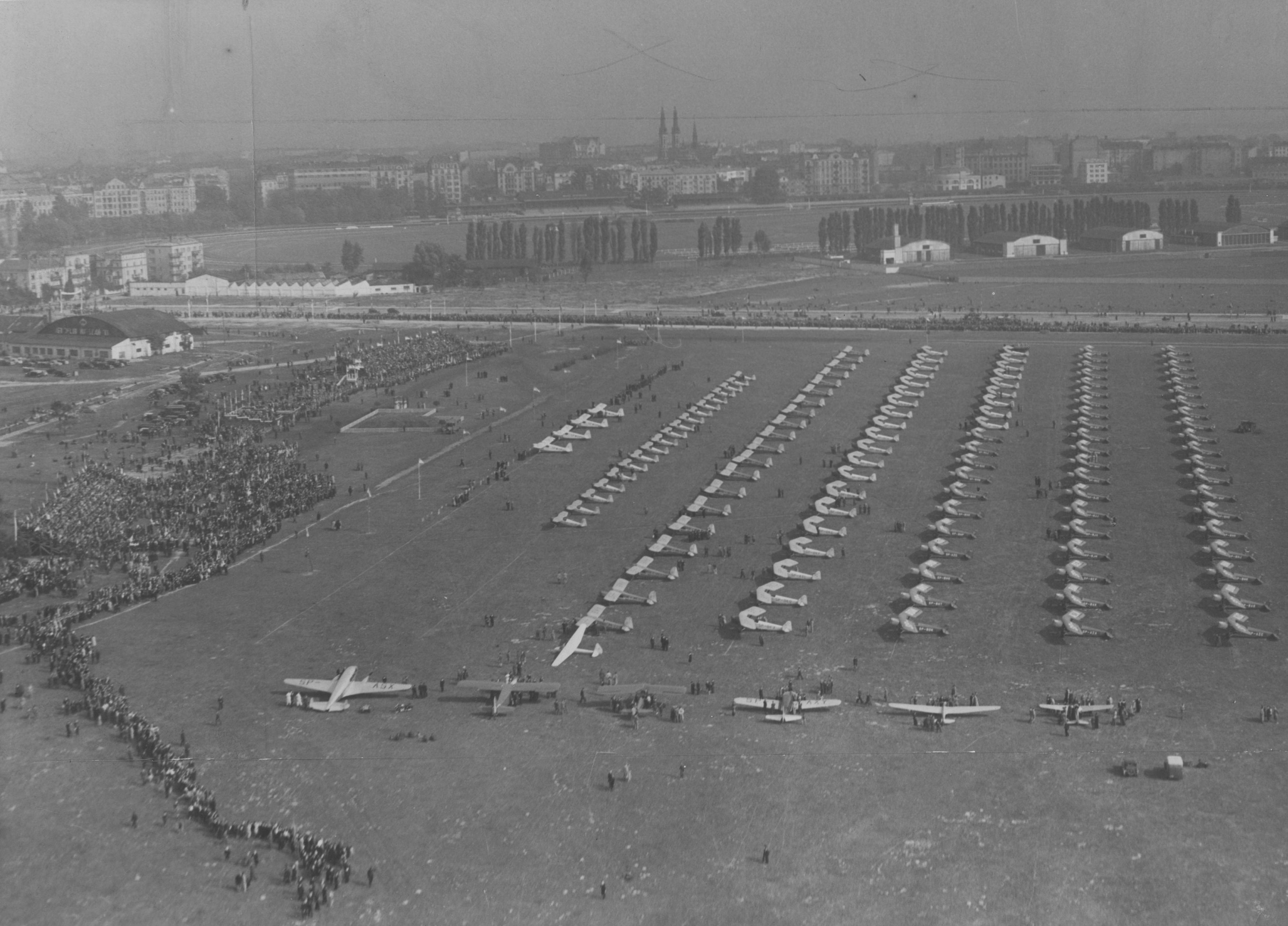
The Mokotów Aerodrome in 1937.

At the turn of the 20th century, the land of Mokotów was partitioned and sold for housing development, and numerous new streets were created. In the 1910s, following the decommissioning of the nearby fortifications, the area began rapidly developing with the construction of tenement houses, especially alongside Puławska Street and Topolowa Street (now Independence Avenue). The village of Mokotów, together with the rest of its municipality, was incorporated into Warsaw on 8 April 1916.

In 1910, the Mokotów Aerodrome was established at the Mokotów War Field, featuring dirt runways. It became the city's first aerodrome, and until the outbreak of the First World War, it was a popular civil and sports airfield. Following the beginning of the conflict in 1915, it began being used by the Imperial Russian Air Service, which stationed there six fighter planes. In August of the same year, the aerodrome was captured and used by the German Air Combat Forces. Its infrastructure was updated and expanded, and 21 new hangars were constructed, including those for the Parseval airships. Following the end of the war, and the establishment of the Second Polish Republic, in 1919, the aerodrome became a base for the growing military and civilian aviation industry. Since 1920, international passenger flights were chartered there. In 1929, it became the headquarters of the then-established national LOT Polish Airlines. It was also a venue for numerous air shows, parades, and international aviation tournaments. In 1934, the passenger traffic was moved to the Warsaw Chopin Airport in Okęcie. Following this, Independence Avenue was built between 1934 and 1938, crossing the cleared eastern side of the aerodrome. It formed a major arterial road connecting Mokotów with Downtown. It partially incorporated the former Topolowa Street in Mokotów. The aerodrome was closed down in 1947.

In 1918, the National Institute of Public Health was founded at 24 Chocimska Street, operating as a state research institute for hygiene, epidemiology, bacteriology, immunology, and parasitology.

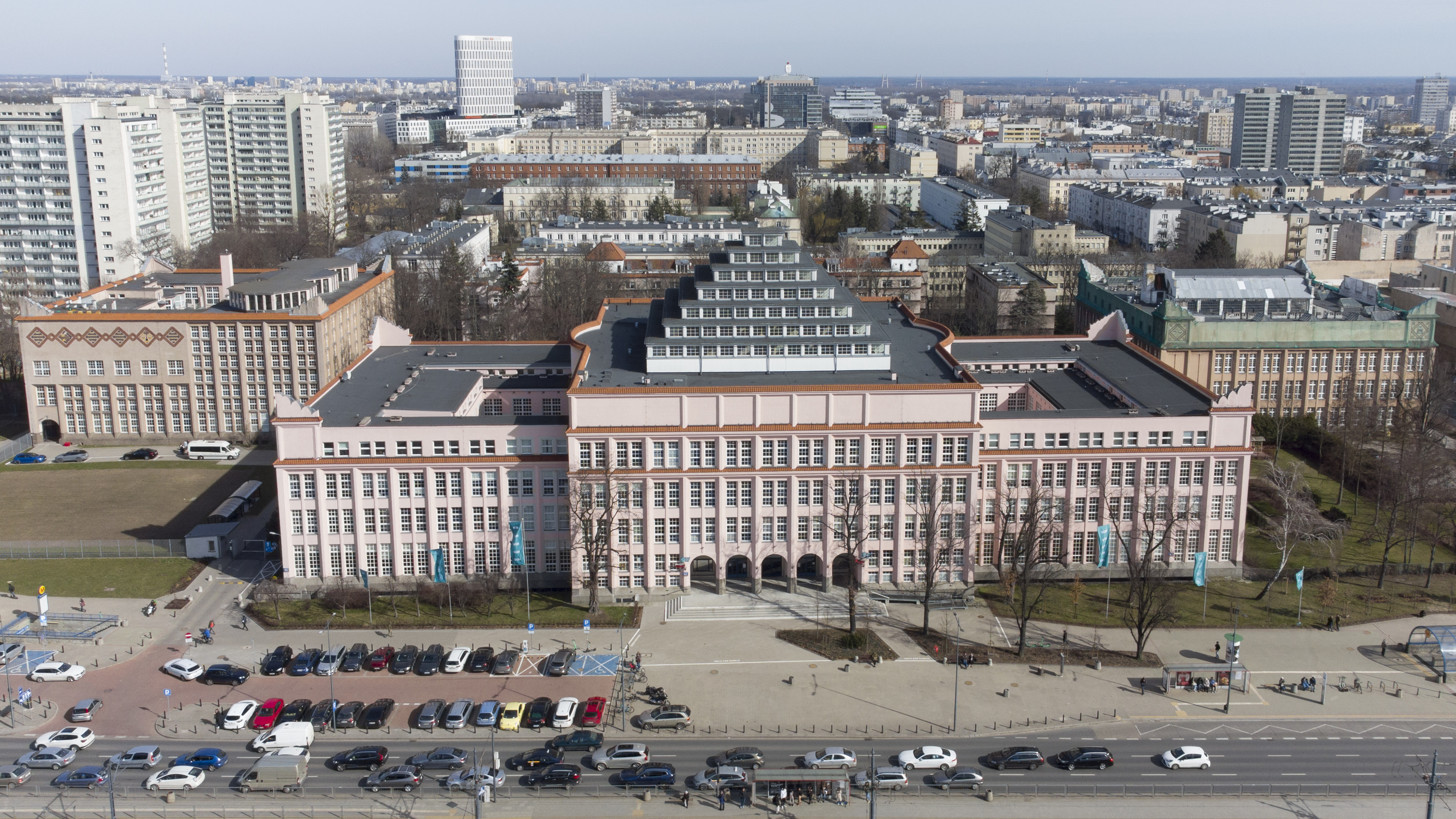
The campus of the SGH Warsaw School of Economics, opened in 1925.

In 1925, a new building of the SGH Warsaw School of Economics was opened at 24 Rakowiecka Street, and in 1931 it was joined with the library at 22 Rakowiecka Street. The campus was expanded in 1955 with another building at 162 Independence Avenue.

Around 1925, a campus of the Warsaw University of Life Sciences was opened at 26 and 30 Rakowiecka Street. It also included a small closed garden with an area of around 1.5 ha, which since 2003, has the status of a protected landscape park. During the Second World War, the school was officially closed, and continued teaching students in secret. It was reopened in 1945, after the end of the conflict. In the 1960s, the school begun developing a new campus on Nowoursynowska Street in Stary Służew. In 2003, all remaining faculties and institutions of the university were moved to the new campus.

In 1927, the tram tracks were built alongside Rakowiecka Street, connecting it with the network on Puławska Street. It ended with a turning loop at the intersection with Łowiecka Street.

In 1930, the new headquarters of the Polish Geological Institute were opened at 4 Rakowiecka Street. The building also begun housing its museum of geology.

In 1934, a new campus of two buildings of the Hipolit Wawelberg and Stanisław Rotwand State Higher School of Machine Construction and Electrical Engineering was opened at 85 Nurbutta Street. Its main building, located at 4 and 6 Mokotowska Street in Downtown was destroyed in 1944 during the Warsaw Uprising in the Second World War. The school reopened after the war in 1945 in the new campus, under the name Hipolit Wawelberg and Stanisław Rotwand School of Engineering. In 1951, it was merged with the Warsaw University of Technology, which uses its campus to the present day. In 1948, two new buildings were added to the campus, located at 84 and 86 Nurbutta Street, as the headquarters of the Faculty of Automotive and Construction Machinery Engineering, and the Faculty of Mechanical Engineering, respectively.

In 1936, the Wedel House, a International Style tenement house of businessperson Jan Wedel, was built at 28 Puławska Street.

In 1939, the new headquarters building of the General Staff of the Polish Armed Forces was opened at 4A Rakowiecka Street.

=== Second World War ===
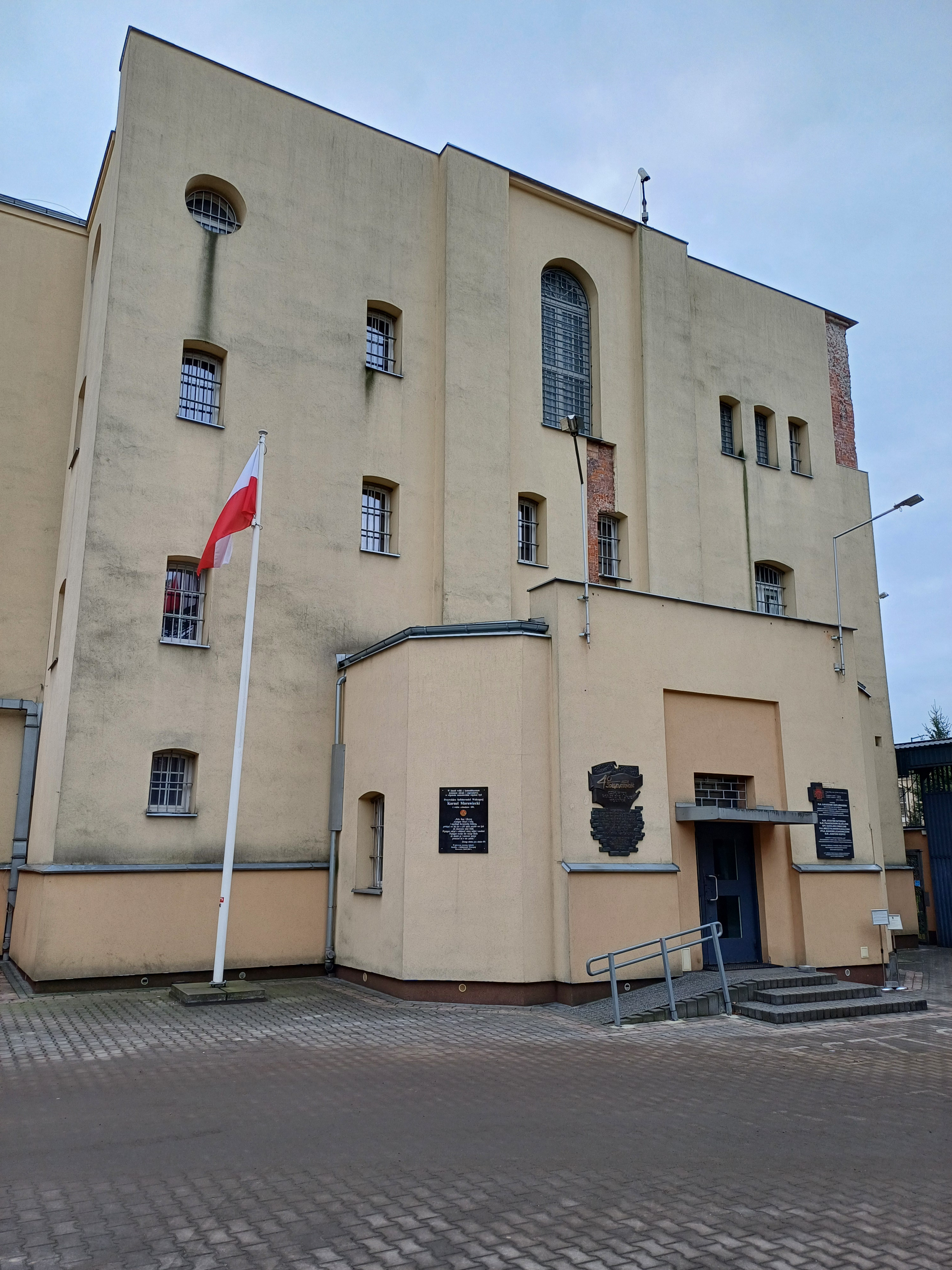
The former building of the Mokotów Prison, built in 1904. During the Second World War, it was used by the German regime to hold political prisoners, and was a location of a massacre in 1944.

On 1 September 1939, Nazi Germany began the invasion into Poland, starting the Second World War, with their forces arriving at the outskirts of Warsaw on 8 September, beginning the siege. Polish positions in Mokotów were mainly defended by the 4th battalion of the 21st Infantry Regiment, and one battery of 75 mm guns. On 9 September, the German forces began an attack on the city, supported by an aerial and artillery bombardment. The 2nd battalion of the 12th Motorised Rifle Regiment, and the 2nd Battalion of the 35th Tank Regiment, charged through the Mokotów Field, before being forced to retreat around the intersection of Independence Avenue and Wawelska Street, by the fire from the infantry and artillery in Mokotów and Ochota. On the next day, German forces launched a series of small diversion attacks on Mokotów, Ochota, and Wola. On 25 September, the Fort M, which housed a Polish radio station, was attacked by the 10th Infantry Division of the German Army, and was captured the next day. On 26 September, the German 10th Tank Division also attacked Mokotów from the south, with heavy fighting taking place at the intersections of Ursynowska Street with Independence Avenue, and with Puławska Street, before being pushed back to its positions at the Rabbit House palace, losing 3 tanks and several other vehicles and numerous soldiers. The next day, they repelled a Polish counteroffensive, suffering huge casualties. The city eventually capitulated on 28 September.

While under occupation, Mokotów housed strong garrison of German units, including a grenadier battalion of the Protection Squadron in barracks at 4A Rakowiecka Street, in the former building of the General Staff of the Polish Armed Forces, and barracks at Kazimierzowa and Woronicza Streets. The Fort M housed the headquarters of the Warsaw Airport Command of the German Air Force, with a staff of 500 people, and the barracks. The air force also stationed anti-aircraft artillery at the Mokotów Aerodrome, while the operations of the airport were limited to minimum, with barracks for its operators on Puławska Street. The neighbourhood also featured the headquarters of the local branch of the Gendarmerie of the Order Police on Dworkowa Street. Additionally, the Mokotów Prison, with its building dating to 1904, began being used to hold the political prisoners, as an auxiliary facility to the Pawiak prison. It was constantly overcrowded, with the peak number of inmates recorded at 2,505 in November 1941. Around 30% of the prisoners were released in July 1944.

On 6 February 1943, the alderman of Warsaw signed the law establishing the German Residencial District, with the area of the neighbourhood of Mokotów, to the east of Puławska Street, becoming its part. It was envisioned as an area exclusive to German residents, although it was not separated physically by walls and other boundaries from the rest of the city. While it had large population of German residents, including immigrants from Germany and people from Poland who were given the Volksdeutsche status, it also housed Russian and Ukrainian collaborators, and Poles who were given exemption from being relocated to other parts of the cities. In May 1944, some parts of the German Residencial District were separated by the authorities with barbed wire fences.

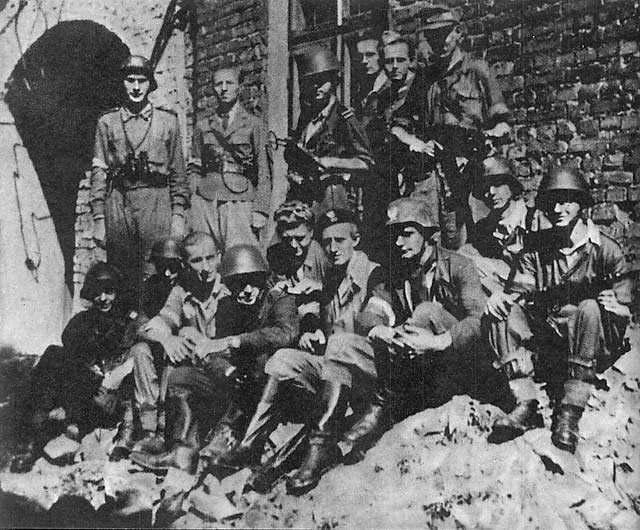
The Home Army soldiers of the Baszta Regiment Group, which fought in Old Mokotów during the Warsaw Uprising.

On 1 August 1944, at 17:00, with the beginning of the Warsaw Uprising, the soldiers of the Mokotów Subdistrict of the Home Army underground resistance attacked the German forces in targets across the neighbourhood. They suffered heavy casualties while attacking German defensive positions on Rakowiecka and Puławska Street. They also failed to capture German barracks on Kazimierzowa and Woronicza Streets, as well as the Fort M, which was subsequently used to organise counterattacks on the insurgents. As such, majority of the Polish units retreated from the area to the Kabaty Woods. Five companies of the Baszta Regiment Group, commanded by Stanisław Kamiński "Daniel", fortified themselves in the apartment buildings in a rectangular area marked by Odyńca Street, Goszczyńskiego Street, Puławska Street, and Independence Avenue. They captured more land in the following days, forming a strong resistance movement in the area of Upper Mokotów.

At the night from 1 to 2 August 1944, the German officers executed the captured Polish soldiers. This included all officers captured during the attack on Rakowiecka Street, and around 19 wounded soldiers from the Olza Battalion, captured in an attack on Fort M. A portion of the victims was buried alive in the ground, which was later confirmed during the exhumations of the bodies in 1945. The German officers refused to treat the captured insurgents with accordance to the international law about the prisoners of war, not granting them the status of protected persons. The German command also ordered the destruction of the city and mass killings and deportation of all its residents, which lead to the series of war crimes, committed on the civilians in the neighborhood, known as the suppression of Mokotów. At night, the German officers also committed first mass murders on the civilian population of Mokotów. After pushing back Polish attack, officers of the garrison of the Okęcie Airport forcibly gathered around 500 civilians at Fort M, sporadically executing people while removing them from their houses. This included numerous residents on Bochmacka, Baboszewska, and Syryńska Streets.

In the morning of 2 August, 20 soldiers of the Protection Patrol entered a Jesuit monastery at 61 Rakowiecka Street, which provided a shelter to several civilians, with accusation that the German soldiers were shot at from the building. The soldiers searched the monetary, not finding any proof to their claims. Afterwards, they forced all occupants to a small room in the basement, where they threw grenades at them. The soldiers spend the next several hours searching for and killing the survivors. Around 40 people, including 18 Jesuits, were killed. The bodies were doused with petrol and lighted up. Fourteen people survived, mostly with injuries, and managed to leave the building after the German officers left.

On 1 August, the Mokotów Prison held 794 inmates, of which 41 were under the age of 18. On that day, it was attacked by 80 soldiers of the Baszta Regiment Group, led by Antony Figura "Kot". The regiment managed to capture the administration building but could not gain control over the buildings with cells, and retreated the next day. During the fighting, the German officers interned Polish prison guards. On 3 August, a unit of the Protection Squadron arrived to the prison, with orders to execute all of its inmates and interned guards. A group of 60 inmates were ordered to dig two rows of graves at the courtyard, being executed by machine gun fire afterwards. In the following hours, the German officers executed over 600 prisoners. Having observed the courtyard massacre from their cells, some inmates decided to break out from the prison. They killed a few soldiers, set fire to the prison, freed other inmates and barricaded the second floor. The soldiers and guards retreated from the building to the front gate, assuming the prisoners would have to cross it to escape. Instead, the inmates climbed onto the roof at night, and descended the prison wall with ladders provided by nearby residents. Between 200 and 300 inmates escaped to the area controlled by the Home Army insurgents. The fate of the interned Polish guards remains unknown, with conflicting testimonials of witnesses whether they were executed or not.

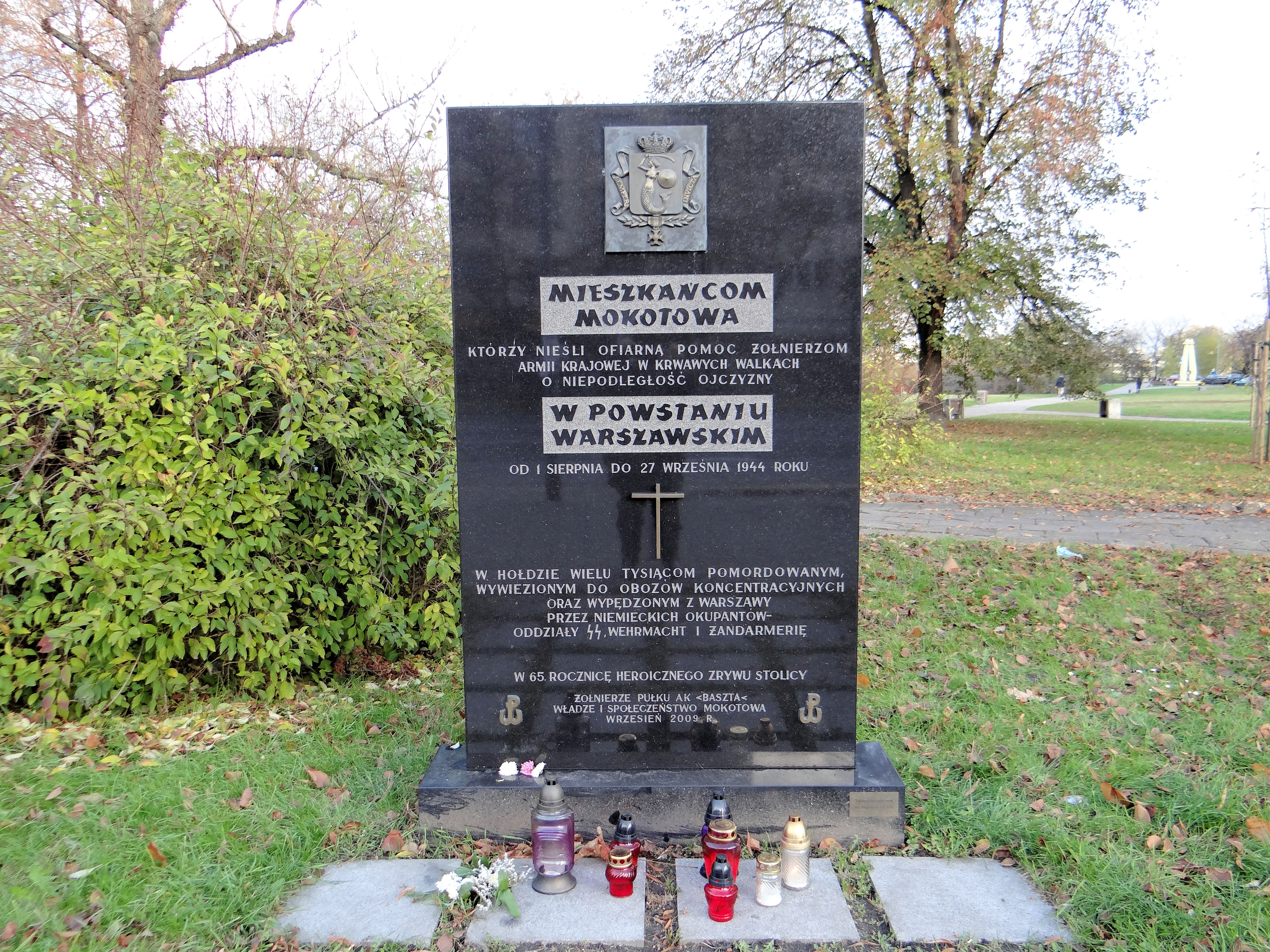
The memorial to the victims of the suppression of Mokotów during the Warsaw Uprising.

In the first days of the uprising, the German officers from the Protection Squadron, the Order Police, and the German Army repeatedly carried out raids aimed at terrorizing the Polish civilian population in Old Mokotów. During those actions, they committed summary execution, burned down houses, and raped women. On 2 August, several dozen civilians, including women and children, were executed on Madalińskiego and Kazimierzowska Streets. Among them, ten men were locked in a small room, and burned alive. On 3 August, officers of the Order Police, backed by several tanks and Ukrainian collaborators, committed series of summary executions alongside Puławska Street and adjusted cross streets, killing several hundreds civilians, including women and children. Over 150 residents of houses at 49 and 51 Puławska Street, mostly women and children, were rounded up and taken to the vicinity of the headquarters of the Gendarmerie of the Order Police on Dworkowa Street. When arriving at the nearby staircase leading down an escarpment to a park area, now known as the Eye of the Sea Park, the German officers lifted barbed wire, suggesting they were letting captured civilians escape to the area controlled by the Home Army. After a portion of the group descended down the staircase, the officers opened fire, killing around 80 people.

In the morning of 4 August, two companies of the Baszta Group Regiment conducted an unsuccessful attack on the headquarters of the Gendarmerie of the Order Police. In the retaliation, its officers, together with a group of Ukrainian collaborators, targeted residents of tenements at 5 and 7 Olesińska Street. They rounded up somewhere between 100 and 200 people were rounded up in the basement and murdered with grenades, with survivors being executed with machine guns. The event became one of the largest singular mass killings in Mokotów during the uprising. The next day, officers of the Protection Squadron and the Security Police rounded up and executed around 100 people at 3 and 5 Skolimowska Street, and around 80 people at 11 Puławska Street. Among the victims were several members of the Polish resistance, which were hiding in the area, including captain Leon Światopełk-Mirski, the commander of the 3rd region of the Mokotów Subdistrict of the Home Army. The German officers continued to sporadically enact another executions in the following days. They killed around 20 residents of a tenement at 132 and 136 Independence Avenue on 11 August, and around 30 residents of a tenement at 39 and 43 Madalińskiego Street. Some witnesses also recounted execution of around 60 people near Rakowiecka Street, sometime at turn of August and September 1944.

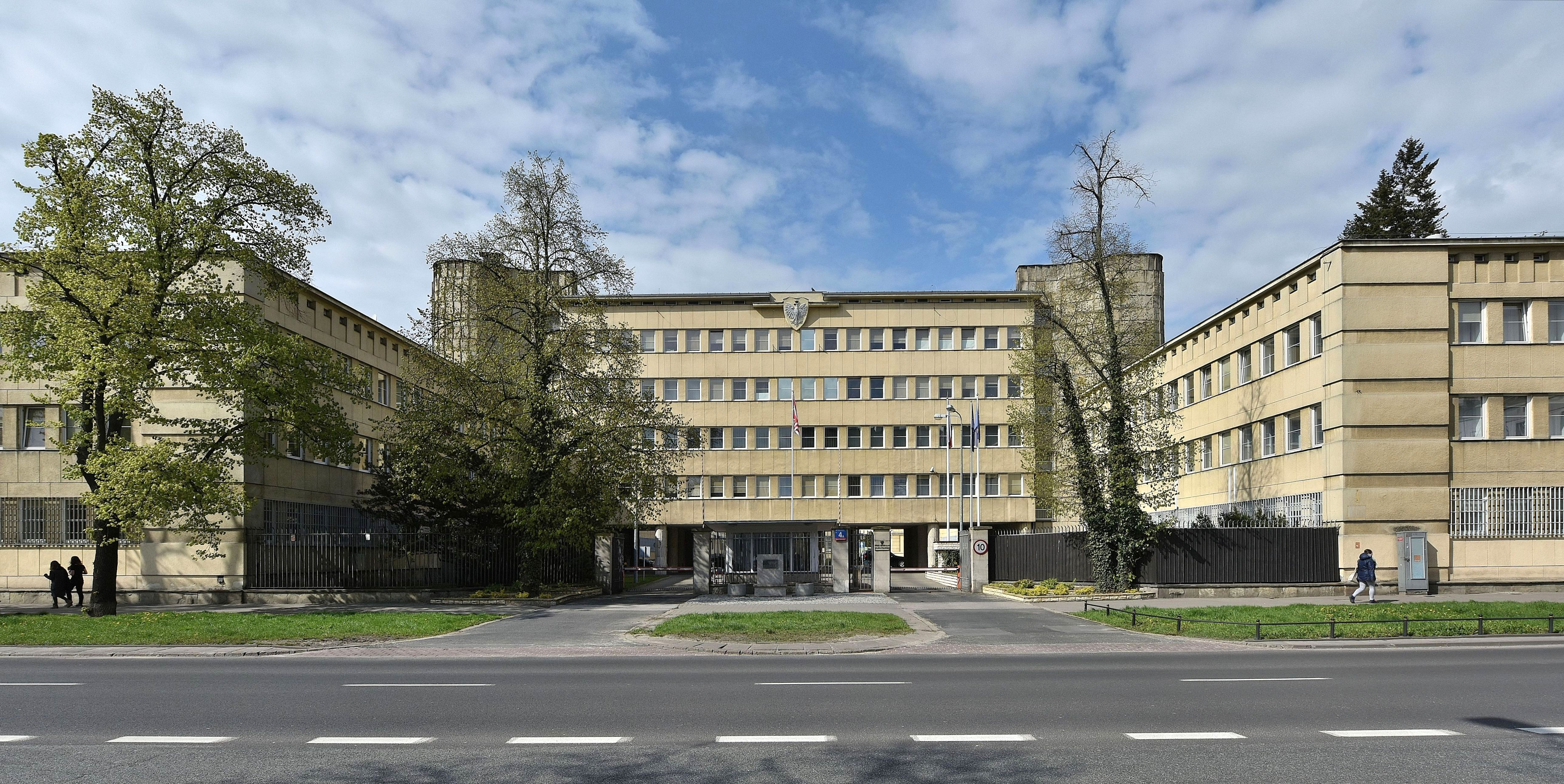
The building of the General Staff of the Polish Armed Forces, which during the Second World War served as the barracks of the Protection Squadron, and later an internment camp for Polish civilians during the Warsaw Uprising.

On 2 August, the officers of the Protection Squadron, forcibly removed residents of tenements at several streets in Mokotów, and gathered them at their barracks, located the former building of the General Staff of the Polish Armed Forces at 4A Rakowiecka Street. The building was turned into a provisionary prison, with inmates being held as hostages, with the threat of being executed if the insurgent would not capitulate within three days. A majority of women and children were freed the next day. In the following days, as the German officers began systematically and forcibly expelling Polish population from Mokotów, the facility was turned into a permanent internment camp for the displaced population. A majority of the inmates were adult men, who were forced to perform labour such as dismantling insurgent barricades, cleaning tanks, burying corpses, earthworks in the barracks, cleaning the streets and latrines, or carrying and loading goods stolen by the German officers onto lorries. Most of the labour was intended solely to exhaust and humiliate the detainees. The staff tormented and beat the prisoners at every opportunity. The inmates were also starved with dangerously low rations. The first group of prisoners received food only on the second day, while some were starved until the third day. The harsh conditions soon led to the complete exhaustion of the prisoners. An epidemic of dysentery also broke out among the inmates.

At least 100 people were executed in the facility. On 3 August, 45 men were picked at random, and executed by the officers. According to some sources, it took place the next day instead. Another group of 45 men were killed the next day. Individual executions also often took place within the barracks. Some of the male inmates were also transported by the Gestapo in the cars to an unknown destination, with their fate unknown. They were most likely executed in the Police District, in the former building of the General Inspector of the Armed Forces, or near the headquarters of the Secret Police on Szuch Avenue. This included between 20 and 40 men taken on 9 August, and a group of nearly 70 men, taken on a single day, at the turn of August and September. Women inmates were used as human shields, being forced to walk in front of the tanks, while charging insurgent barricades. After some time, prisoners would be transferred to the transit camp no. 121 in Pruszków, and other gathering points. The prison operated until the second half of September, though many inmates were held there until the beginning of October.

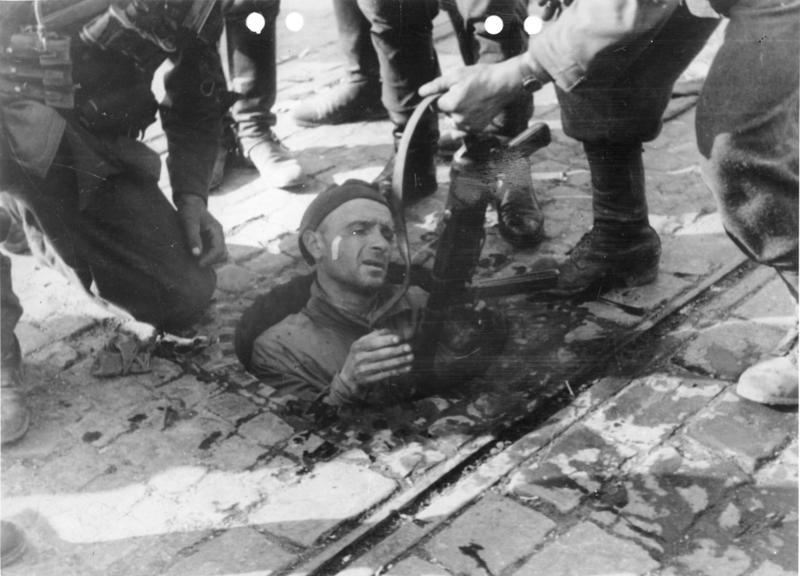
One of the Home Army soldiers being pulled out from the sewage canals by the German officers on Dworkowa Street on 26 September 1944, prior to the massacre of the captured insurgents.

On 24 September, the German soldiers attacked the insurgent positions in Upper Mokotów, leading to heavy fighting in the following days. As the attackers gained overwhelming advantage, the commander of insurgents forces in district, lieutenant colonel Józef Rokicki "Karol", ordered a retreat on 26 September. The troops had to travel via the sewerage network to Downtown. Several hours later, brigadier general Antoni Chruściel "Monter", the commander of all insurgents forces, gave orders to return to Mokotów and continue fighting. By that point, around 800 already arrived at their destination, and around 400 were still in the canals. German officers barricaded some of the entrances to the canals, and through granades and pumped the calcium carbide gas, causing casualties among the insurgents. Amit the chaos, a group of soldiers got lost in the canals, and mistakenly went to the entrance near the headquarters of the Gendarmerie of the Order Police on Dworkowa Street. After being discovered, they were forced to resurface by its officers and taken captive around 10:00 on 27 September. The German officers separated civilians and a portion of women nurses and runners from the rest of the group. The soldiers were then forced to kneel on an edge of an escarpment of the Eye of the Sea Park. After one of the soldiers made an unsuccessful attempt to take a weapon from a guard, the entire group of around 140 captives was executed. Another group of 98 soldiers captured in the canals, was executed the same day near Chocimska Street. During the fighting, the German officers conducted series of summary executions of wounded soldiers and medical stuff in the field hospitals across the city, including in Mokotów. On 26 September, several patients were killed on field hospitals at 17 and 19 Czeczota Street, and at 117 and 119 Independence Avenue.

In the evening of 27 September, the last insurgent troops in Mokotów agreed to capitulate, in exchange of having their rights as combatants recognised, including having the statues of the protected persons. Around 1,000 soldiers were taken captive. Despite this, on that day, the German officers executed an unknown number of wounded soldiers on Szustra Street, and set a field hospital on fire at 91 Puławska Street, killing over 20 people. The civilian population was systematically expelled from captured territory, with soldiers plundering and setting the buildings on fire. Over 70 men, suspected of participating in the uprising, were executed on Kazimierzowska Street. The expelled civilians were rounded up at the Służewiec Racecourse at 266 Puławska Street, from where they were transported to the transit camp no. 121 in Pruszków. The neighbourhood suffered large destruction throughout the conflict, with majority of its buildings being destroyed. The area, together with the rest of Warsaw, was captured by the Red Army of the Soviet Union on 17 January 1945.

=== Communist period ===
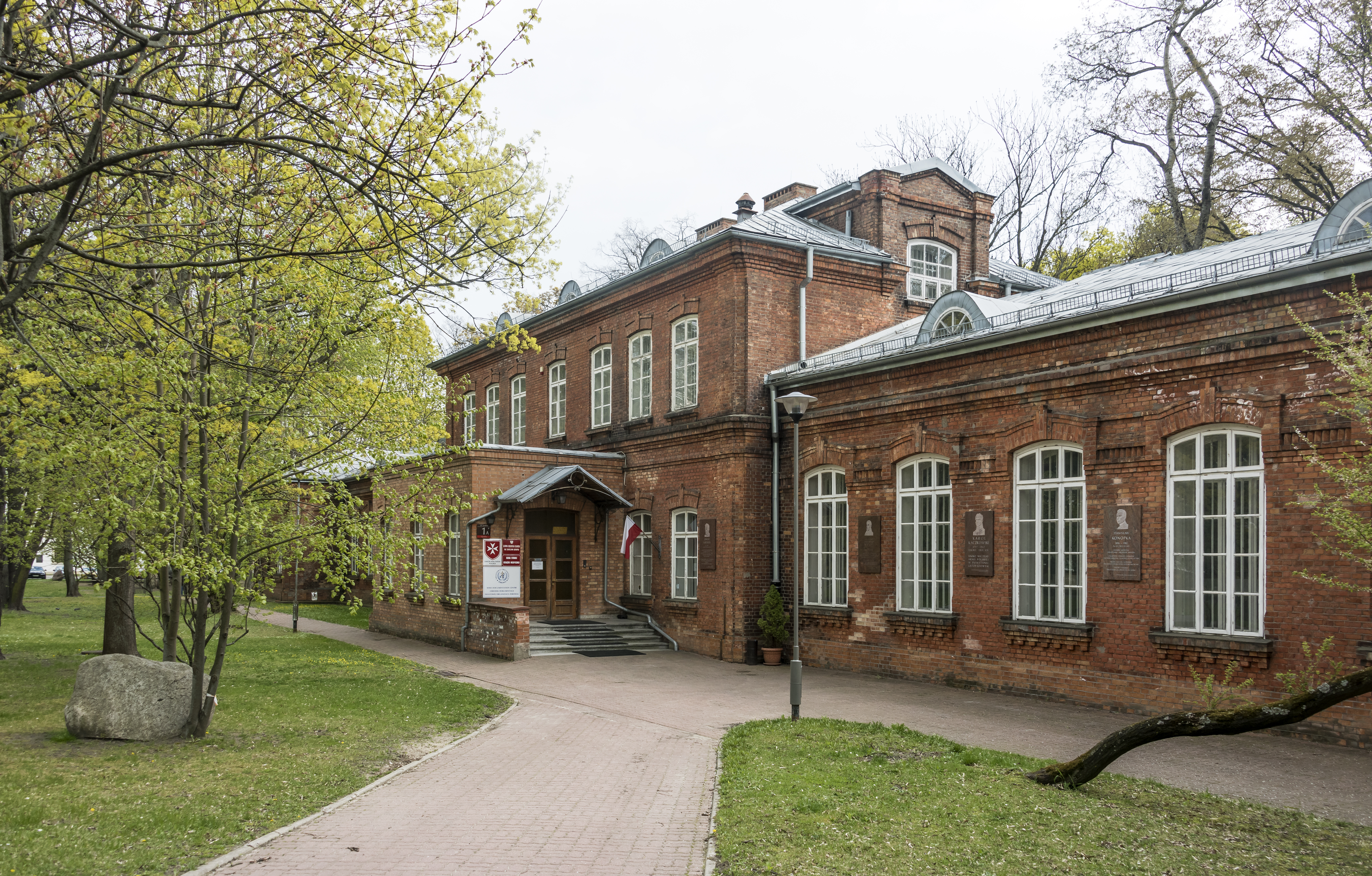
The Stanisław Konopka Central Medical Library, founded in 1945.

In 1945, the People's Commissariat for Internal Affairs of the Soviet Union begun using the Mokotów Prison to held political prisoners. In 1948, its administration was given to the Ministry of Public Security of Poland. The inmates were tortured and executed. The number of the victims remains unknown. Their bodies were disposed across the city, including being buried in mass unmarked graves at the Służew New Cemetery and the Powązki Military Cemetery. In 1956, the facility begun operating as a regular criminal prison. It was closed in 2017. Since then, it houses the Museum of the Cursed Soldiers and the Political Prisoners of the Polish People's Republic.

In 1945, the Stanisław Konopka Central Medical Library was founded at 22 Chocimska Street, as a cultural institution of the Ministry of Health. It operates as a reassert library aiming to collect all Polish literature in the field of medicine and related sciences, as well as the most important works of world medical literature.

In 1947, the New Theatre was founded in a venue at 39 Puławska Street, later renamed to the State New Theatre in 1949, introducing musical and comedy acts. In 1954, it was transformed into the Warsaw State Operetta, a comedy theatre group, was founded at 39 Puławska Street. In 1966, it moved to 49 Nowogrodzka Street in Downtown, and was reorganised into the Roma Musical Theatre in 1994. From 1966 to 1974, the building was used as one of two venues of the People's Theatre. In 1974, the New Theatre was reestablished at the venue, operating until 2005.

Between 1947 and 1952, a housing estate was developed as part of the Warsaw Housing Cooperative, between Madalińskiego Street, Wołoska Street, Wiktorska Street, and Independence Avenue. It consisted of modernist mid-rise apartment buildings, and housed around 10,000 people.

In 1950, the Moskwa cinema was opened at 19 Puławska Street, becoming the largest of its kind in the city. It was closed down and demolished in 1996.

In 1951, as Warsaw was divided into 11 city districts, the neighbourhood became the namesake of the Mokotów district, which encompassed the Upper Mokotów and the western part of the modern Ursynów, mostly to the west of Puławska Street. On 1 January 1960, it was combined with the Wilanów district, keeping the former name. On 2 April 1990, the district was transformed into the municipality of Warsaw-Mokotów. On 19 June 1994, it was disestablished, with its northern portion being incorporated into the municipality of Warsaw-Centre, becoming its subdivision as the Mokotów district. The municipality was disestablished on 27 October 2002, with Mokotów becoming again a city district of Warsaw.

In 1952, the Institute of Haematology and Transfusion Medicine (known until 1992 as the Institute of Haematology), a state research facility of haematology and transfusion medicine was founded at 5 Chocimska Street. In 2006, its headquarters were moved to 14 Indiry Gandhi Street in Ursynów, with its old building still remaining operational. In 1953, the Holy Family Specialist Hospital was also opened at 25 Madalińskiego Street. In 1955, the Central Laboratory of Agricultural Industry was opened at 36 Rakowiecka Street, as a subsidiary of the Institute of Distilling Technology and Renewable Energy Sources in Bydgoszcz, Poland. In 1983, the laboratory was incorporated into the structures of the Institute of the Fermentation Industry, which in 1988 was transformed into the Institute of Biotechnology and the Agricultural and Food Industry. In 2009, it was combined with the Institute of Meat and Fat Industry and the Institute of Sugar Industry, forming the Institute of Agricultural and Food Biotechnological Industry.

In 1955, the National Film Archive was founded as the organisation of the Ministry of Culture and National Heritage, with the headquarters at 61 Puławska Street. In 2017, it was joined with the National Film Archive, forming the National Film Archive and Audiovisual Institute, which is one of the largest archives of film and audio in Europe. The new organisation moved to the headquarters at 3 and 5 Wałbrzyska Street in Służew.

In 1956, the tram tracks were opened alongside Independence Avenue, connecting with network on Rakowiecka Street. In 1961, the tracks were also built alongside Wołoska Street. In 1969, the tracks were removed from Rakowiecka Street, between the intersections with Independence Avenue and Puławska Street.

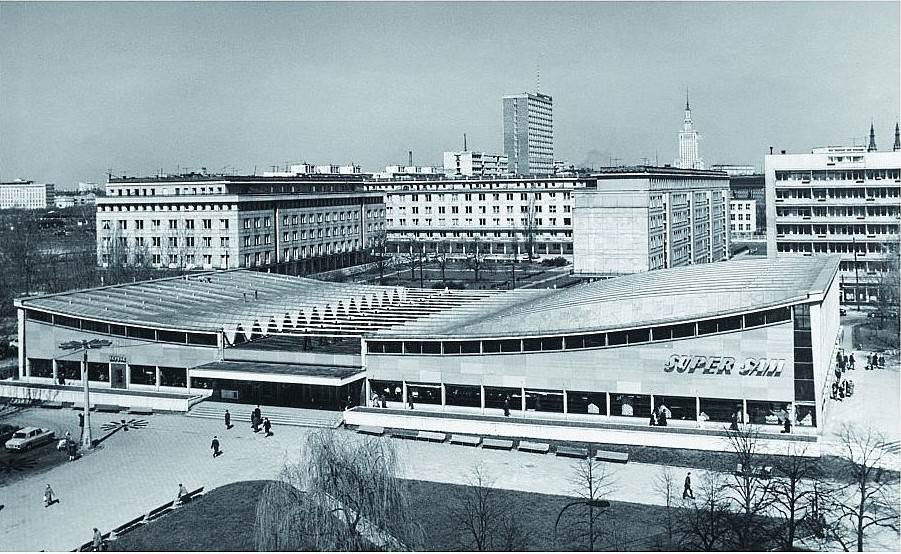
Supersam, the first supermarket store in Poland, opened in 1962, and demolished in 2006.

In 1962, Supersam, the first supermarket store in Poland, was opened at 2 Puławska Street, next to the Union of Lublin Square. It was considered a notable example of the modernist architecture in Poland. The building was demolished in 2006.

Between 1962 and 1968, the housing estate known as Osiedle Batorego, was developed between Stefana Batorego Street, Wiśniową Street, Rakowiecka Street, and Św. Andrzeja Boboli Street, with an area of 8.8 m^{2}. Its centered on Independence Avenue, and consists of high-rise apartment buildings, constructed in the large-panel-system technique. It was designed for around 6,500 residents.

Throughout the 1970s and 1980s, the area of the former Mokotów Aerodrome, which was closed in 1947, was developed into a large urban park, known as the Mokotów Field. Its construction begun in 1977, and it was opened in sections, that were finished in 1983, 1986, and 1991. Currently, it is part of the City Information System areas of Filtry, South Downtown, and Wyględów.

Between 1980 and 1989, the St. Andrew Bobola Sanctuary was constructed at 61 Rakowiecka Street, as the seat of Roman Catholic parish, operated by the Jesuit Order. It was built in a former location of a Jesuit chapel built there in 1935, and destroyed in 1944 during the Second World War. The building also begun housing one of two campuses of the Catholic Academy of Warsaw, a university of theology.

In 1970, the Guliwer Puppet Theatre moved in to the building at 16 Różana Street.

=== Democratic period ===
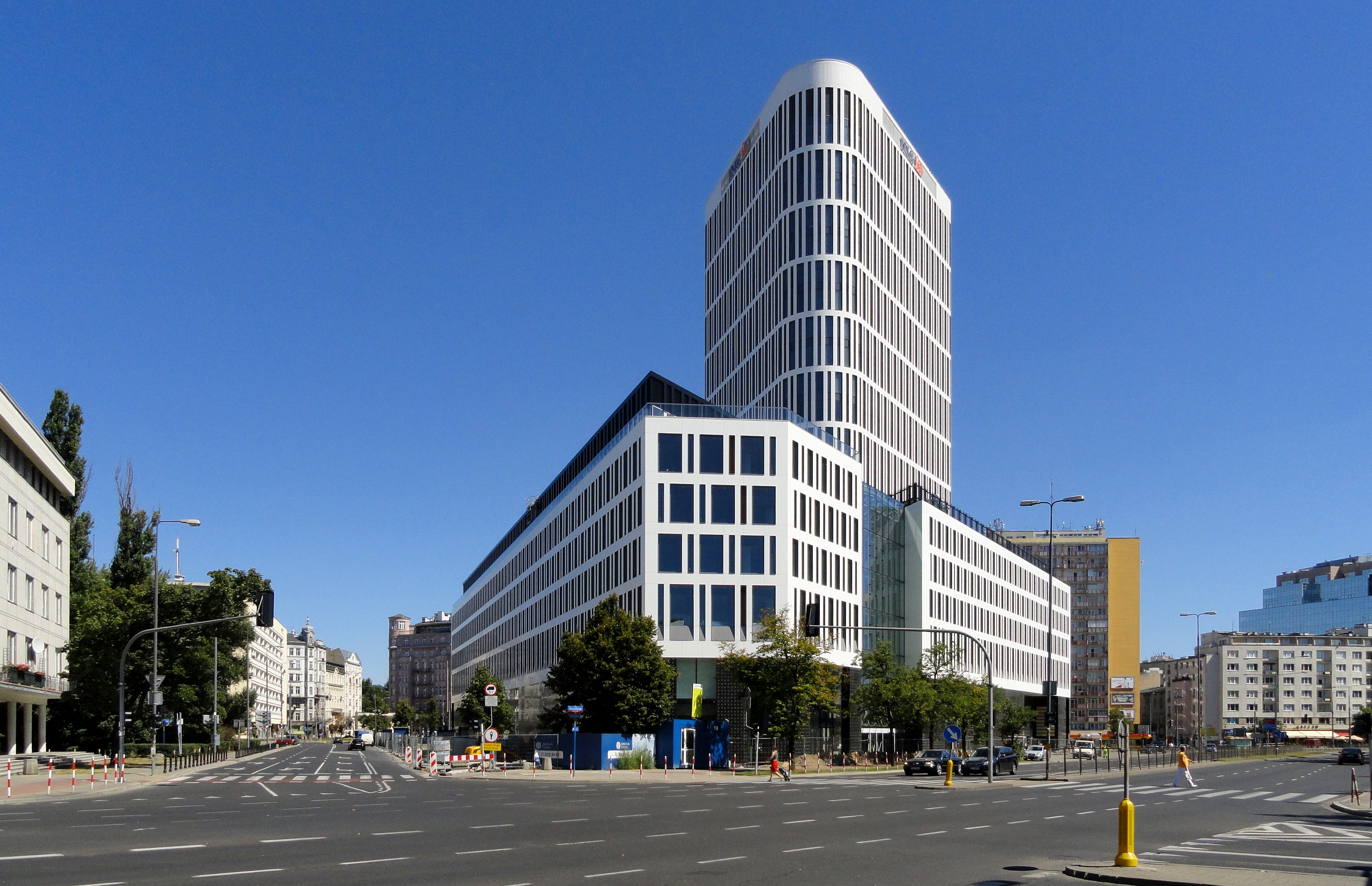
The Plac Unii office building and shopping mall, opened in 2013.

On 7 April 1995, two stations of the M1 line of the Warsaw Metro underground rapid transit system, were opened in Old Mokotów. They were the Racławicka station located at the intersection of Independence Avenue, Racławicka Street, Wiktorska Street, and the Pole Mokotowskie station located at the intersection of Independence Avenue and Racławicka Street.

The same year, the University of Technology and Arts in Applied Sciences, until 2024 known as the University of Ecology and Management, was opened at 12 Olszewska Street, as a private university.

On 4 October 1996, the Mokotów district was subdivided into twelve City Information System areas, with Old Mokotów becoming one of them.

The St. Stephen Church was built between 1998 and 2003 at 1 Św. Szczepana Street. Its parish was founded in 1949, and previously was based in chapel in the Lubomirski Palace in Downtown.

In 1997, the Iluzjon arthouse cinema, which was operated since the 1950s by the National Film Archive (now National Film Archive and Audiovisual Institute), adopted new headquarters at 50A Narbutta Street. The building was opened in 1949, originally housing the Stolica cinema.

In 2008, the New Theatre was founded at 10 and 16 Madalińskiego Street, in a former machine workshop building dating to 1927.

In 2013, the skyscraper Plac Unii was opened at 2 Puławska Street near the Union of Lublin Square. It has 22 stories, with the total height of 90 m, and houses offices and a shopping mall. It was built in place of the former Supersam supermarket.

In 2018, the Academy of Justice, originally known as the Higher School of Justice, was founded 50 Wiśniowa Street, as a division of the Prison Service.

In October 2024, a tram line was opened alongside Spacerowa Street, connecting the network between Puławska Street and Wilanów Town. In December 2025, the tram tracks were rebuilt alongside Rackowiecka Street, between the intersections of Independence Avenue and Puławska Street.

== Housing and economy ==
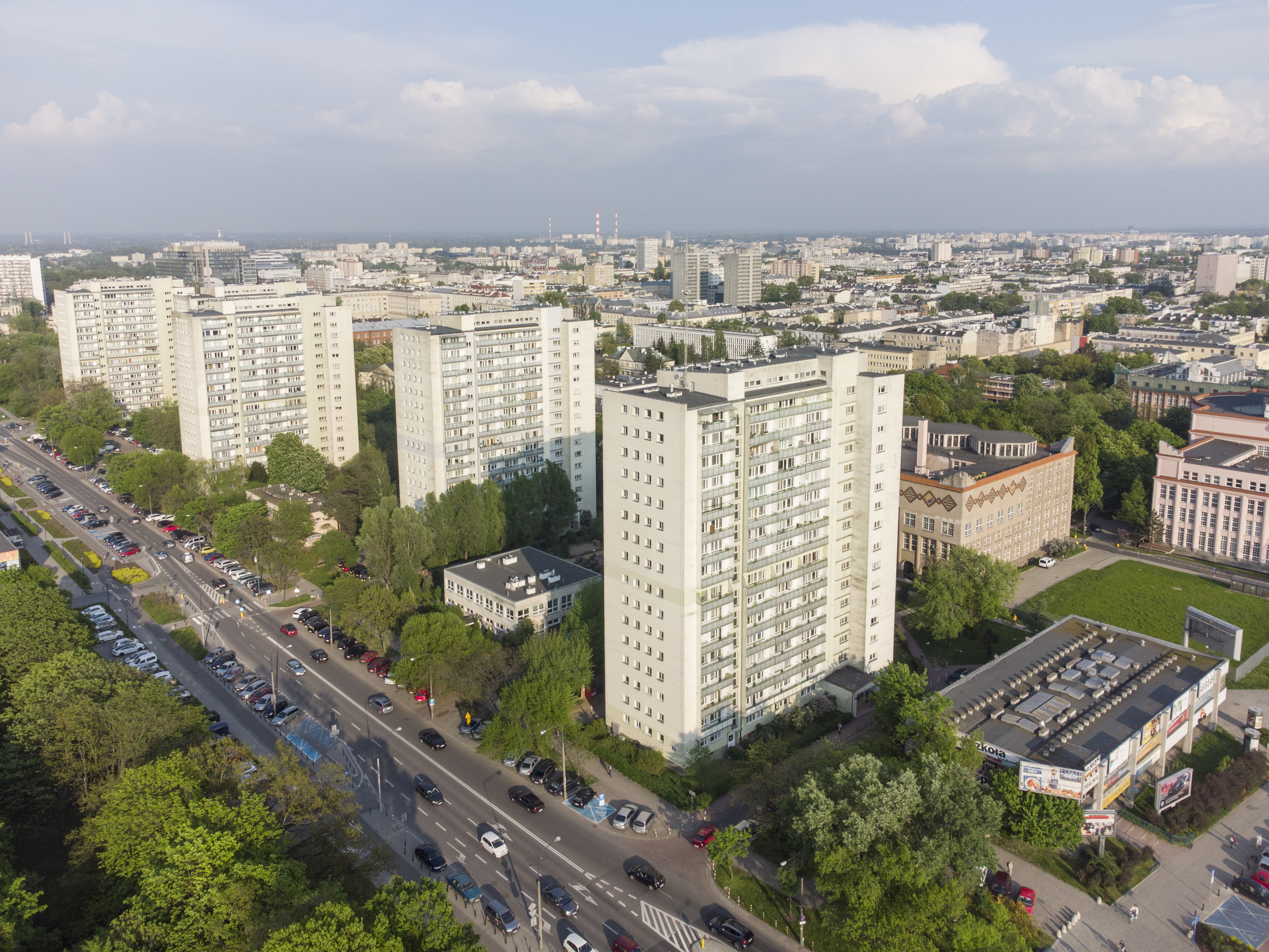
The apartment buildings of housing estate of Osiedle Batorego, at the intersection of Independence Avenue and Stefana Batorego Street.

Old Mokotów is a residential neighbourhood, predominantly consisting of mid- and high-rise apartment buildings. It includes the housing estate of Osiedle Batorego, located in an area of 8.8 m^{2}, between Stefana Batorego Street, Wiśniową Street, Rakowiecka Street, and Św. Andrzeja Boboli Street, consisting of the high-rise apartment buildings, constructed in the large-panel-system technique in the 1960s. It also includes the housing estate of modernist mid-rise apartment buildings, constructed between 1947 and 1952, between Madalińskiego Street, Wołoska Street, Wiktorska Street, and Independence Avenue. The neighbourhood also features the skyscraper Plac Unii, located at 2 Puławska Street near the Union of Lublin Square. It has 22 stories, with a total height of 90 m, and houses offices and a shopping mall.

== Science and higher education ==
Old Mokotów housed the campus of the SGH Warsaw School of Economics, with its headquarters located at 162 Independence Avenue. The neighbourhood also includes a campus of the Warsaw University of Technology, located at 84, 85, and 86 Nurbutta Street, housing the Faculty of Automotive and Construction Machinery Engineering, and the Faculty of Mechanical Engineering. The University of Technology and Arts in Applied Sciences, a private university, is also housed at 12 Olszewska Street.

The neighbourhood also includes state research institutions. Among them are the National Institute of Public Health at 24 Chocimska Street, for the research on hygiene, epidemiology, bacteriology, immunology, and parasitology, and the Institute of Haematology and Transfusion Medicine at 5 Chocimska Street. It also includes the Institute of Agricultural and Food Biotechnological Industry at 36 Rakowiecka Street, and the Polish Geological Institute at 4 Rakowiecka Street. Old Mokotów also has the Stanisław Konopka Central Medical Library, located at 22 Chocimska Street, which operates as a research library of the Ministry of Health, aiming to collect all Polish literature in the field of medicine and related sciences, as well as the most important works of world medical literature. Additionally, the Holy Family Specialist Hospital is located at 25 Madalińskiego Street.

== Culture ==
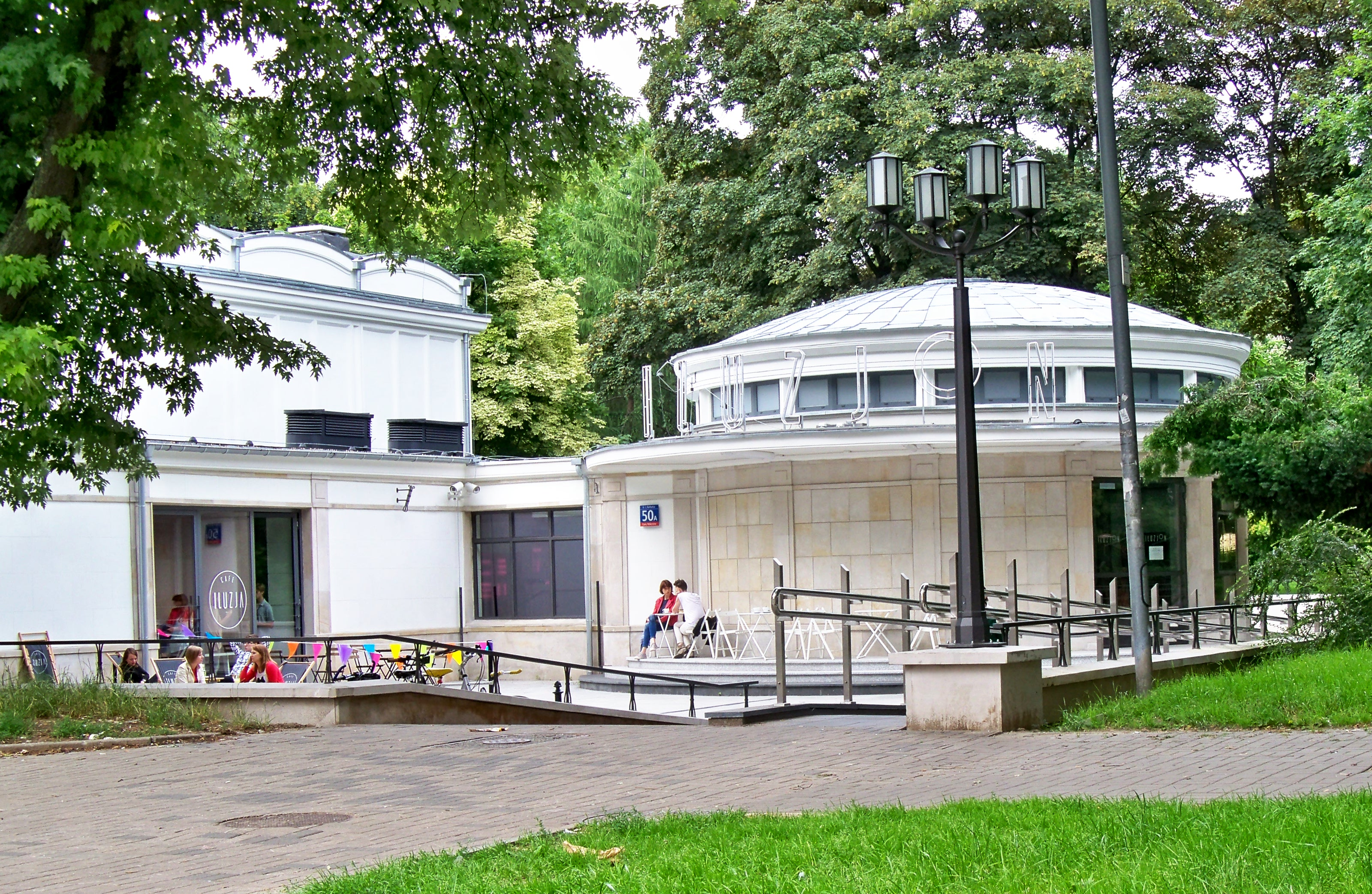
The Iluzjon arthouse cinema.

The neighbourhood includes museums such as the Geological Museum of the State Institute of Geology at 4 Rakowiecka Street, and the Museum of the Cursed Soldiers and the Political Prisoners of the Polish People's Republic at 37 Rakowiecka Street. The latter is operated in the former building of the Mokotów Prison, and is dedicated to the history of the Polish anti-communist resistance fighters and the members and organisations of the dissident movement opposing the People's Republic of Poland and the Soviet control of the country. The neighbourhood also features the Władysław Broniewski Museum, forming a division of the Adam Mickiewicz Museum of Literature. It is housed in a villa at 51 Dąbrowskiego 51 Street, and is dedicated to Władysław Broniewski (1987–1962), a 20th-century poet, writer, translator and soldier, known for his revolutionary and patriotic writings. Old Mokotów features performing arts institutions, including the New Theatre at 10 and 16 Madalińskiego Street, the Guliwer Puppet Theatre at 16 Różana Street, and the Iluzjon arthouse cinema of the National Film Archive and Audiovisual Institute, housed at 50A Narbutta Street. The neighbourhood also includes the Stanisław Moniuszko Warsaw Musical Association, housed in the Szuster Palace at 2 Morskie Oko Street, and dedicated to the propagation of the musical culture.

Old Mokotów has several historic buildings, among others, the Szuster Palace, a Gothic Revival palace residence from 1774, the Church of the Ascension of the Lord from 1904, and the Wedel House, an International Style tenement house from 1936. The neighbourhood also features the Mokotów Tollhouses, two neoclassical tollhouse pavilions from 1818. Their western pavilion houses a museum dedicated to Sue Ryder, a British volunteer with Special Operations Executive in the Second World War, and a member of the First Aid Nursing Yeomanry, who afterwards established charitable organisations, notably the Sue Ryder Foundation (now known simply as Sue Ryder).

The hymn "Marsz Mokotowa" (lit. 'The Mokotów March') is widely considered as an unofficial anthem of the neighbourhood and the entire city district of Mokotów. It was created in 1944, with lyrics written by Mirosław Jezierski and music composed by Jan Markowski, both of whom served in the Home Army at the time. The song is performed on bells every day on 17:00 from the 18th-century clock tower known as the Gothic House, located at 59 Puławska Street in the Eye of the Sea Park.

== Parks and recreation ==
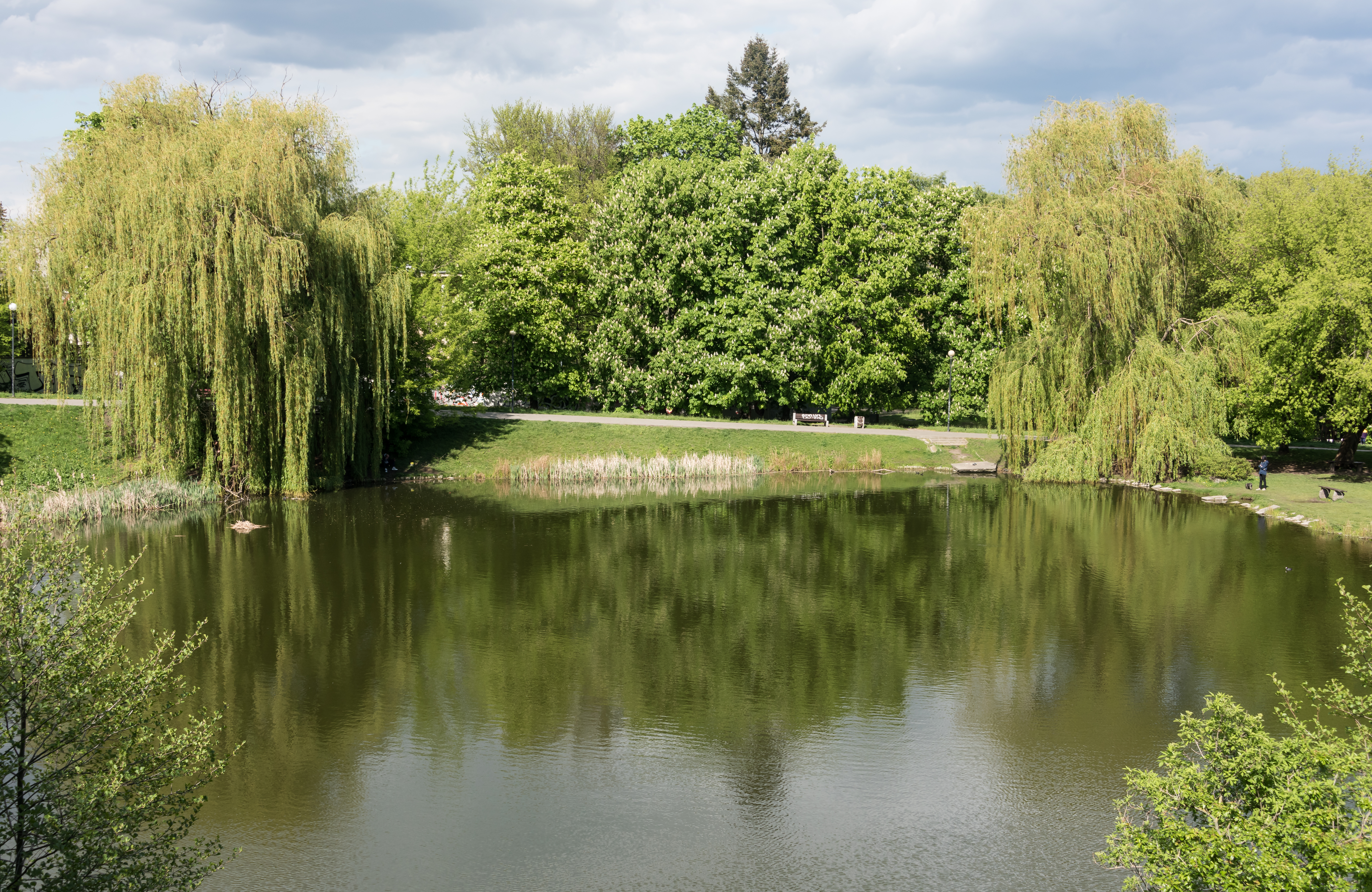
The pond Eye of the Sea in the Eye of the Sea Park.

The neighbourhood includes the western portion of the Eye of the Sea Park, placed alongside Puławska Street. It features the pond Eye of the Sea, which has an area of 0.4358 ha. It also includes the Szuster Palace, a Gothic Revival palace residence from 1774, an 18th-century clock tower known as the Gothic House, and a mausoleum of the Szuster family from 1899. The majority of the park is located within the neighbourhood of Sielce.

Old Mokotów also features the Union of Lublin Square, located in its northeastern portion, at the intersection of Polna, Marshal, Bagatela, Puławska, Klonowa, and Boya-Żeleńskiego Streets, and Szuch Avenue. The neighborhood also features garden squares, including the Stanisław Broniewski "Orsza" Square, located between Różana, Puławska, and Dąbrowskiego Streets, and the Antoni Słonimski Square, encircled by Nurbutta Street. Additionally, Old Mokotów includes the Warsaw University of Life Sciences Park, an enclosed and restricted to the public urban green space, located between Independence Avenue, Rakowiecka Street, and Bruna Street. It has a status of a protected landscape park with an area of around 1.59 ha. The neighbourhood also features a few natural monuments in form of trees and Glacial erratic stones. Among them is the Second Standard-Bearers Rock, a glacial erratic made from biotite gneiss, with the height of 2.9 m (9.51 ft.), the circumference of 8.5 m (27,89 ft.), and the weight of around 30 t. It is placed on Wiśniowa Street in front of the Polish Geological Institute on 4 Rakowiecka Street. Discovered in 1938, it was the largest glacial erratic rock excavated in Warsaw until 2011.

== Transport ==
Old Mokotów includes two stations of the M1 line of the Warsaw Metro underground rapid transit system. They are the Racławicka station located at the intersection of Independence Avenue, Racławicka Street, Wiktorska Street, and the Pole Mokotowskie station located at the intersection of Independence Avenue and Racławicka Street. The neighbourhood also features tracks of the tram network. They are placed alongside Wołoska Street in the west, Puławska and Spacerowa Streets in the east, and Rakowiecka Street and Independence Avenue in the north.

== Government ==
Old Mokotów houses the headquarters of the Border Guard, the Internal Security Agency, the Ministry of the Interior and Administration, the National Council of the Judiciary, the National Health Fund, and the General Staff of the Polish Armed Forces. (Note: Attributed to multiple references:) The area also houses the town hall of the Mokotów district, located at 25 and 27 Rakowiecka Street.

== Religion ==
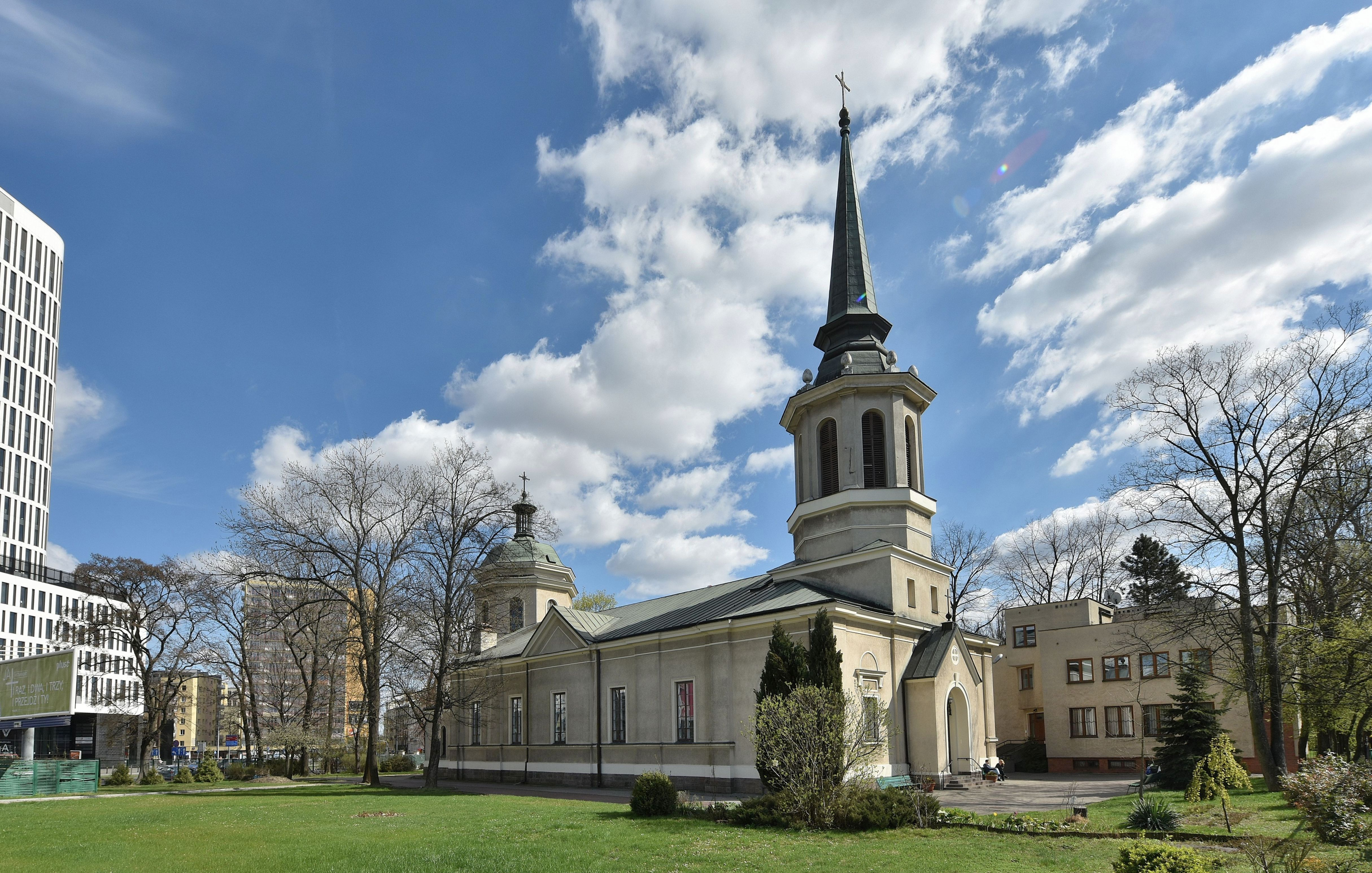
The Church of the Ascension of the Lord, which belongs to the Lutheran denomination and dates to 1904.

Old Mokotów has several parish churches of various denominations. It features two Roman Catholic parish churches, including the St. Andrew Bobola Sanctuary at 61 Rakowiecka Street, operated by the Jesuit Order, and the St. Stephen Church at 1 Św. Szczepana Street. The neighbourhood also includes the Church of the Ascension of the Lord, a historic building from 1904, which belongs to the Evangelical Church of the Augsburg Confession. Additionally, the Second Commune of the Church of Jesus Christ of Latter-day Saints in Warsaw has its seat and chapel at 69 Wiktorska Street.

== Location and boundaries ==
Old Mokotów is a City Information System area in Warsaw, located in the northwestern portion of the Mokotów district, within the subregion of Upper Mokotów. Its boundaries are approximately determined to the north by Stefana Batorego Street, Boya-Żeleńskiego Street, and Union of Lublin Square; to the east by Klonowa Street, Spacerowa Street, and Warsaw Escarpment; to the south by Dolna Street, and Racławicka Street; and to the west by Wołoska Street, and Św. Andrzeja Boboli Street. The neighbourhood borders Filtry, and South Downtown to the south, Sielce, and Ujazdów to the east, Wierzbno to the south, and Wyględów to the west.
