= Statue of Jan Matejko (Warsaw) =

Monument in Warsaw, Poland

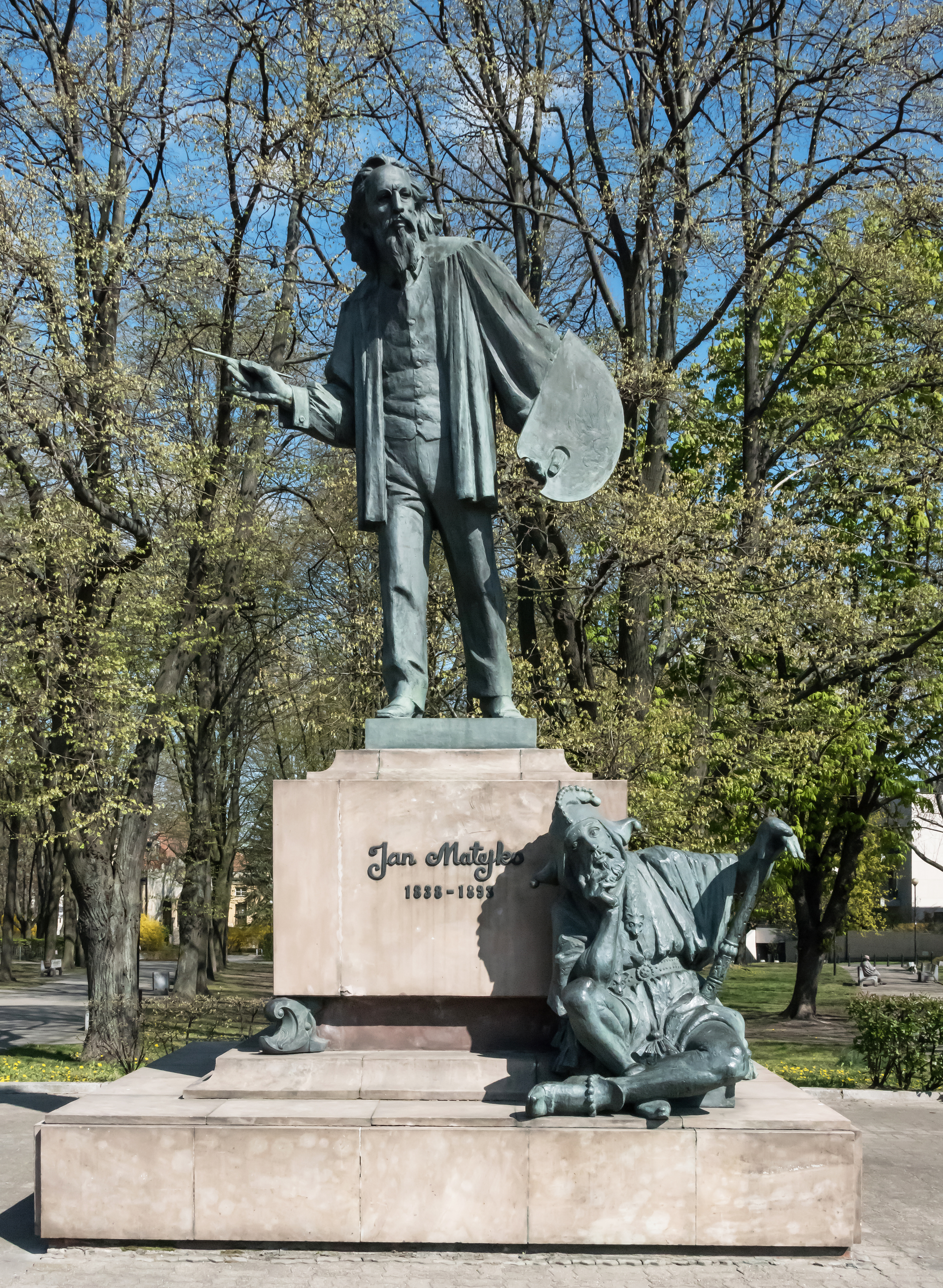
- The Monument of Jan Matejko in 2020.
- Interactive map of Statue of Jan Matejko
- Location: Eye of the Sea Park, Warsaw, Poland
- Coordinates: 52°12′13.26″N 21°01′24.86″E
- Designer: Marian Konieczny
- Type: Statue
- Completion date: 3 May 1994
- Dedicated to: Jan Matejko

The statue of Jan Matejko (Polish: Pomnik Jana Matejki) is a monument in Warsaw, Poland, located in the Eye of the Sea Park within the district of Mokotów. It depicts Jan Matejko, a 19th-century painter. The work was designed by Marian Konieczny and unveiled in 1994.

== History ==
The monument was designed in 1989 by sculptor Marian Konieczny, and manufactured by the Gliwickie Zakłady Urządzeń Technicznych (Gliwice Technical Devices Factory) in Gliwice, Poland. It was proposed by the Cultural Property Protection Society. It was unveiled in the Eye of the Sea Park in Warsaw on 3 May 1994.

== Characteristics ==
The monument is located in Warsaw, Poland, in the Eye of the Sea Park, near Puławska Street. It consists of the sculpture of Jan Matejko, a prominent 19th-century painter, placed on a pedestal. He holds a palete in his left hand, and a brush in his right hand. Next to the pedestal is a sculpture of a sitting Stańczyk, a famous 16th-century court jester, and a subject of Matejko's 1862 painting of the same name.
