= Eye of the Sea Park =

Urban park in Warsaw, Poland

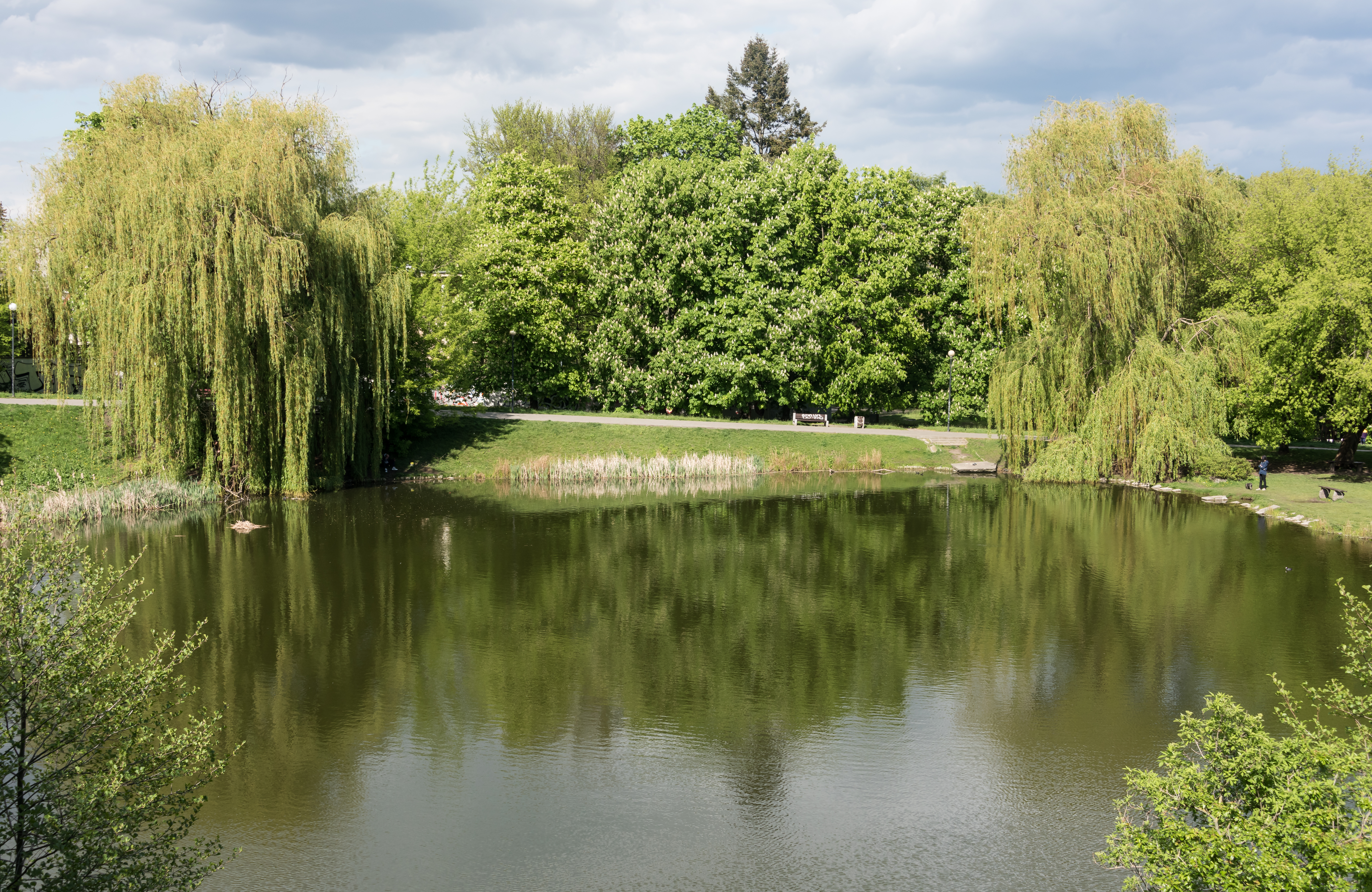
- The Eye of the Sea pond in the park.
- Interactive map of Eye of the Sea Park
- Type: Urban park
- Location: Mokotów, Warsaw, Poland
- Coordinates: 52°12′22″N 21°01′29″E
- Area: 17.9 hectares (44 acres)
- Created: 1774 (original development); 1958 (current form)
- Designer: Szymon Bogumił Zug (1774); Jerzy Brabander, Elżbieta Jankowska, Z. Gnos (1958)

The Eye of the Sea Park (Polish: Park Morskie Oko) is an urban park in Warsaw, Poland. It is located in the neighbourhoods of Old Mokotów and Sielce, within the district of Mokotów, between Puławska Street, Dworkowa Street, Morskie Oko Street, Promenada Street, Belwederska Street, Zajączkowska Street, and Spacerowa Street. It has the total area of 17.9 ha. It was originally developed in 1774, and its current form, in 1958.

== History ==
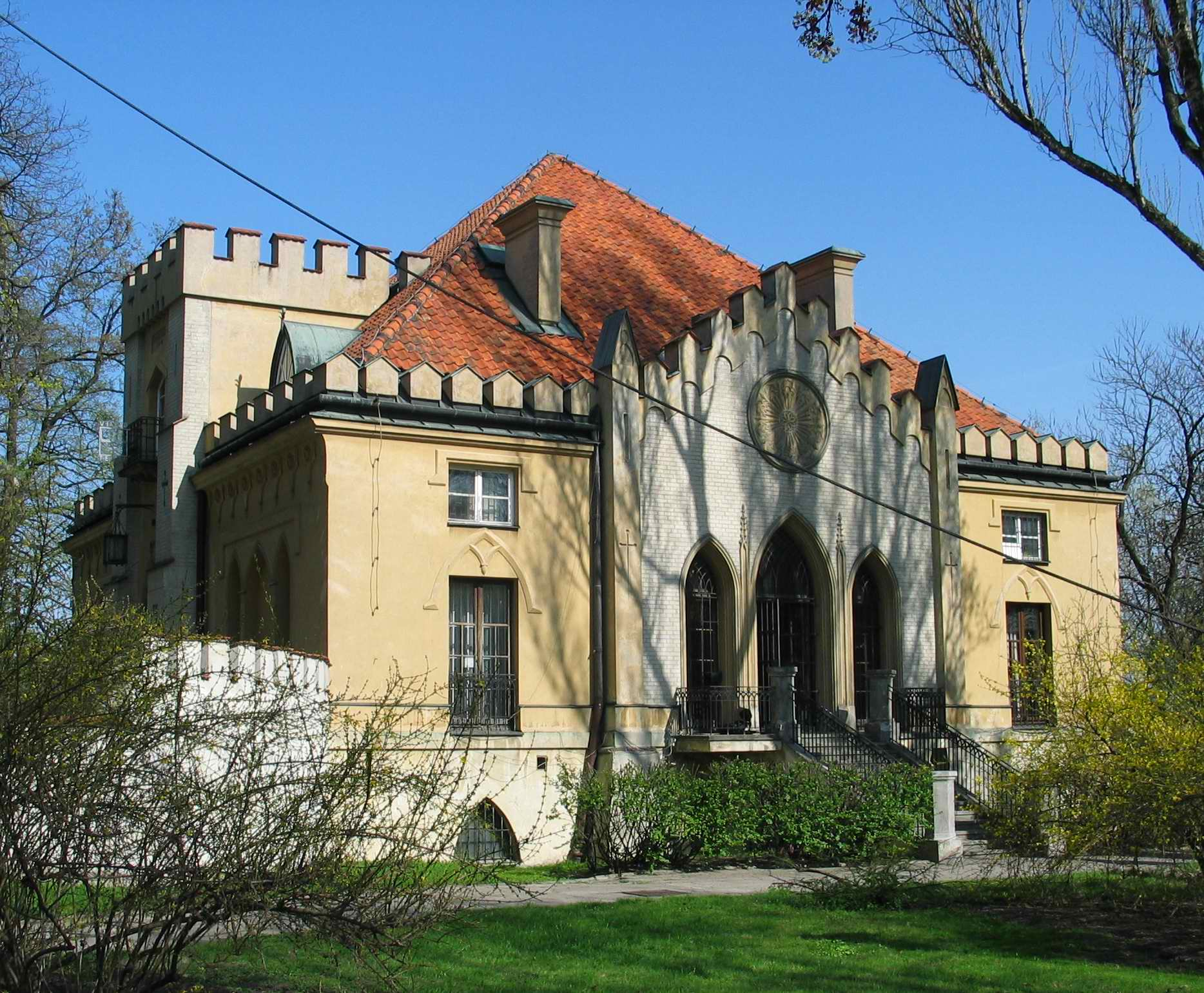
The Szuster Palace in the Eye of the Sea Park.

The southern portion of the current park was developed between 1772 and 1774, as a garden complex of the Szuster Palace, built at the same time, as a residence of princess Elżbieta Izabela Lubomirska. The palace was designed by Ephraim Schröger, while the gardens by Szymon Bogumił Zug. The estate became known as Mon Coteau (my hill in French).

In 1820, the estate became property of nobleperson Anna Tyszkiewicz, and in 1845, it was bought by Franciszek Szuster, who then opened a popular holiday village in the area, named the Promenade (Polish: Promenada), with the gardens becoming its recreational green area. In 1899, in the park, at the top of the Warsaw Escarpment, was placed the grave chapel of the Szuster family, designed by W. Raczkiewicz. The park also included the Promenade Ponds, which were two artificial lakes formed from flooded clay pits. At the end of the 19th century, there was opened the Promenade amusement park, with a luxury restaurant, circus, and open air there among other attractions. It operated until the outbreak of the First World War, and again, from its end until the begging the Second World War.

During the Second World War, almost all of the trees in the park were cut down, and in 1944, the Szuster Palace was destroyed.

After the war, the park was reconstructed by a team led by Jerzy Brabander. It was also expanded with the nearby garden square around the Eye of the Sea pond, which was originally formed from a flooded clay pit. Works on its part begun in 1958, and were led by Elżbieta Jankowska and Z. Gnos. It was reforested with poplar trees in 1968, and further works lasted from 1976 to 1979. The Szuster Palace was rebuilt between 1962 and 1965. The park was named the Eye of the Sea Park.

On 3 May 1994, in the park near Puławska Street was placed the Jan Matejko Monument, dedicated to the prominent 19th-century painter. It was designed by Marian Konieczny.

== Characteristics ==
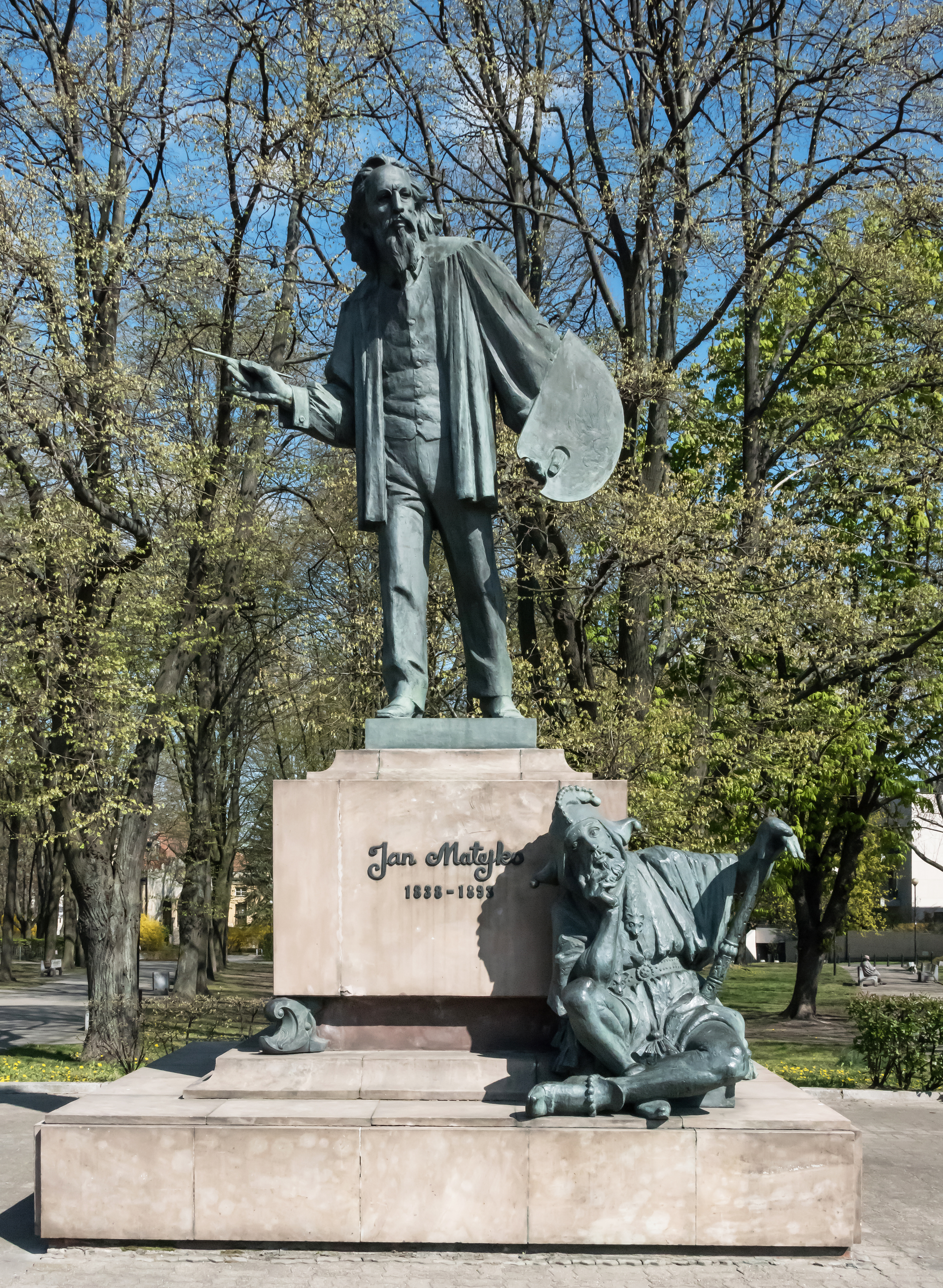
The Jan Matejko Monument.

The park is located in the bourhoods of Old Mokotów and Sielce, within the district of Mokotów, between Puławska Street, Dworkowa Street, Morskie Oko Street, Promenada Street, Belwederska Street, Zajączkowska Street, and Spacerowa Street. It has the total area of 17.9 ha.

The park is divided into two portions, with the upper northern portion known as the Eye of the Sea (Polish: Morskie Oko), and the lower southern portion, Promenade (Polish: Promenada). They are separated by the elevation shift of the Warsaw Escarpment. In the park are located three artificial ponds, the Eye of the Sea to the west, and the Promenade Ponds to the east.

Within park is located the Szuster Palace, and a grave chapel of the Szuster family, as well as the Jan Matejko Monument by Marian Konieczny, and the Monument in Memory of the Home Army Mokotów Insurgents. There is also a rock with a commemorative plaque to the Magnet Baszta Waligóra redoubt, and three plaques commemorating victims of the Nazi occupation regieme executed there in 1944.
