= Eye of the Sea (Warsaw) =

Artificial lake in Warsaw, Poland

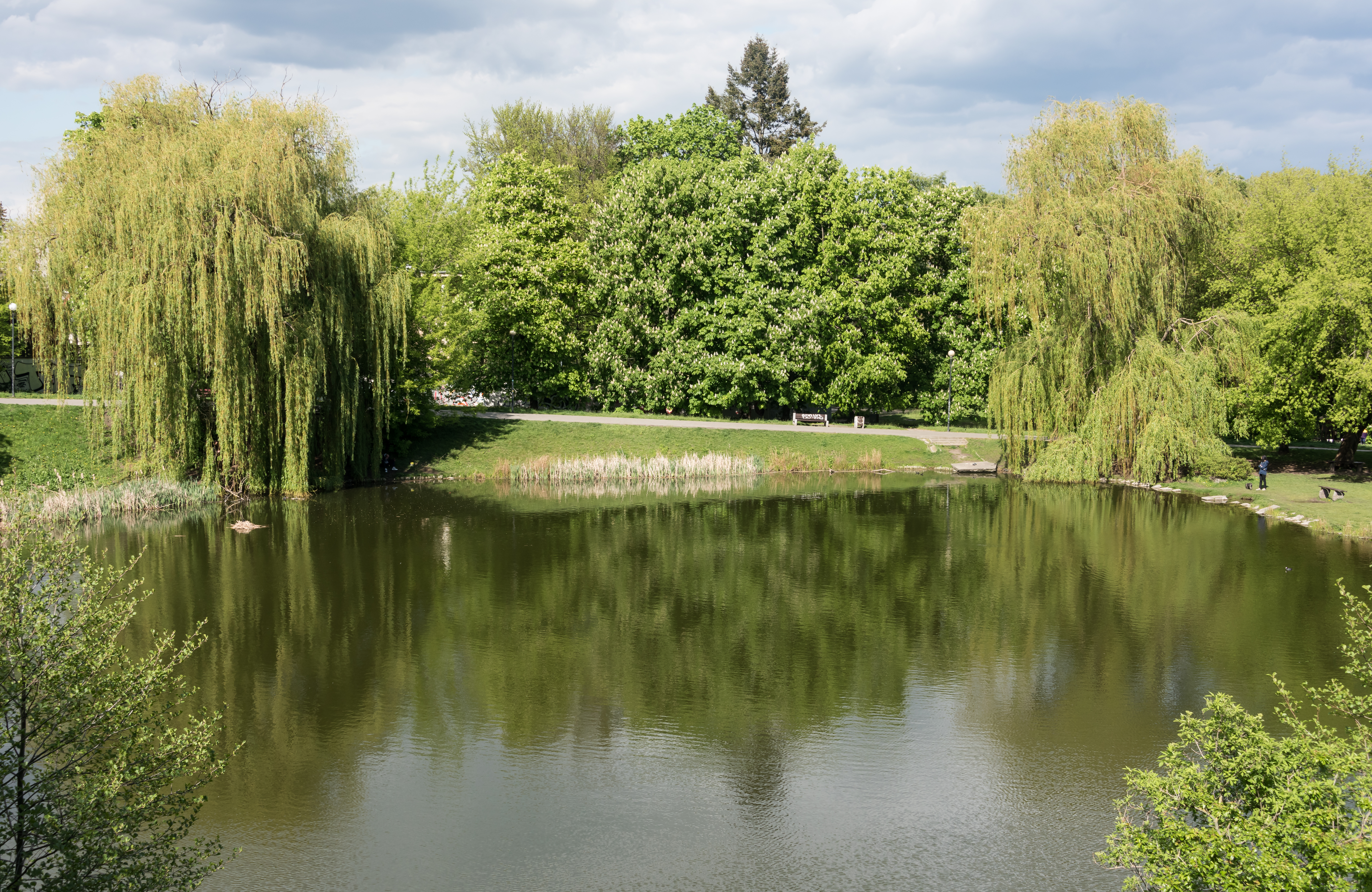
- The Eye of the Sea as seen from its southern coast, in 2020.

- Location within Poland
- Location: Eye of the Sea Park, Warsaw, Poland
- Coordinates: 52°12′23″N 21°01′30″E
- Lake type: Artificial pond
- Basin countries: Poland
- Surface area: 0.4358 hectares (1.077 acres)
- Average depth: 2 metres (6 ft 7 in)
- Surface elevation: 99.5 metres (326 ft)

The Eye of the Sea (Polish: Morskie Oko) is an artificial pond in Warsaw, Poland, located within the district of Mokotów in the Eye of the Sea Park.

== Characteristics ==
The Eye of the Sea is an artificial pond, located within the Eye of the Sea Park in the city of Warsaw, Poland. It was formed in a flooded man-made clay pit. It is fed by the groundwater. It has the total area of 0.4358 ha, and its between 1 and 2 m deep. The lake is part of the drainage basin of the Czerniaków Cannal. Its number in the catalogue of the Map of the Hydrographic Subdivision of Poland is 83337.
