= Wyględów =

Neighbourhood in Warsaw, Poland

- City Information System area (neighbourhood)
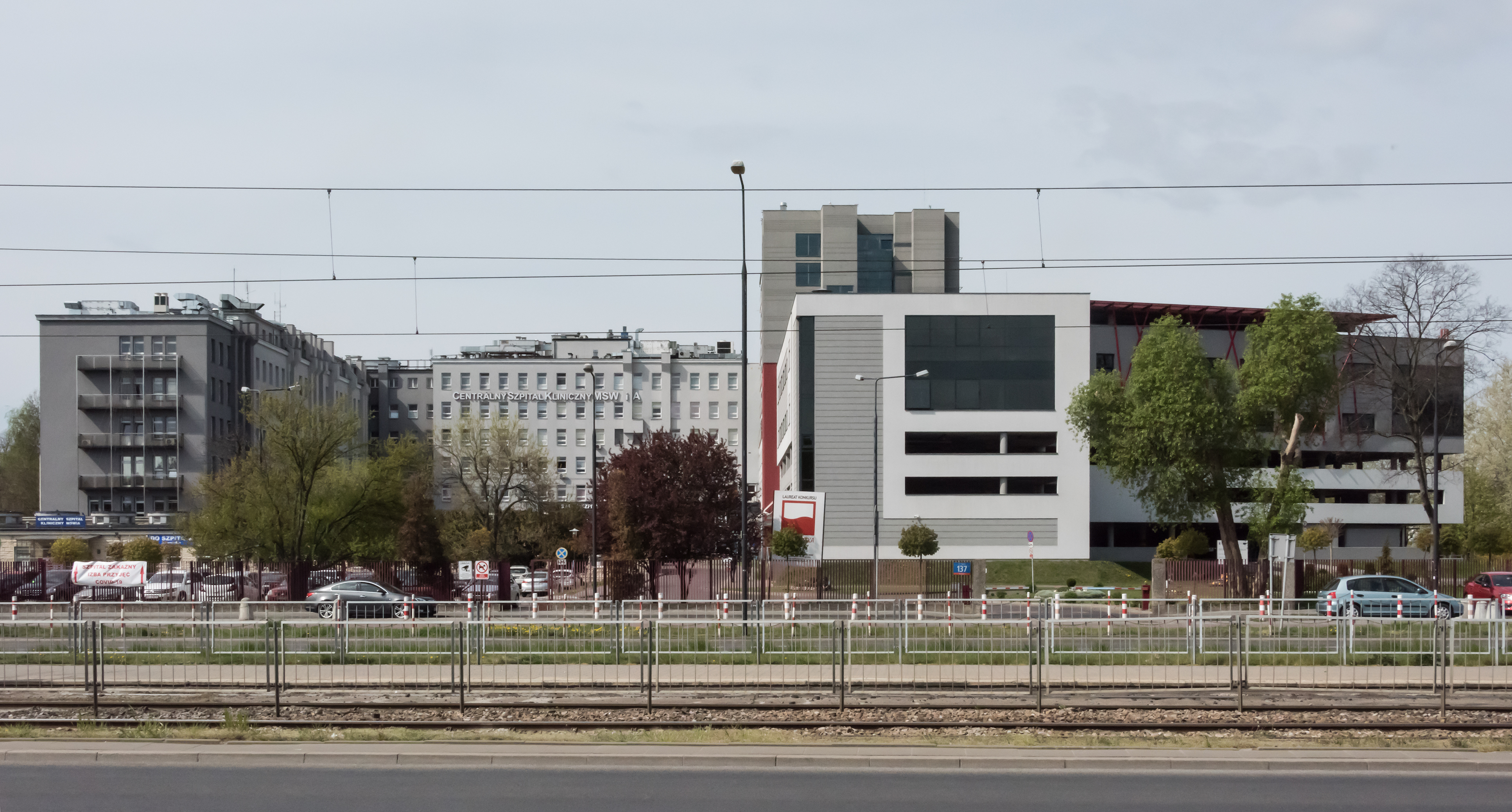
- The State Medical Institute of the Ministry of Interior and Administration.

- Wyględów within the Mokotów district.
- Coordinates: 52°11′48″N 20°59′35″E
- Country: Poland
- Voivodeship: Masovian
- City county: Warsaw
- District: Mokotów
- Subdistrict: Upper Mokotów
- Time zone: UTC+1 (CET)
  - Summer (DST): UTC+2 (CEST)
- Area code: +48 22

Wyględów (Polish: [vɘ̟ˈɡlɛn.duf]) is a neighbourhood, and the City Information System area, in Warsaw, Poland, within the Mokotów district. It is a residential area dominated by mid- and high-rise apartment buildings, with lesser presence of low-rise houses. The neighbourhood also includes the State Medical Institute of the Ministry of Interior and Administration which forms a hospital and research institution, the Fort M, decommissioned fortifications, now operating as recreational and retail space, and the Mausoleum Cemetery of the Soviet Soldiers, dedicated to soldiers who died in the Second World War. Wyględów forms a part of the western half of the district, known as the Upper Mokotów.

The oldest known records of localities in the area of modern neighbourhood come from the 16th century, referring to the settlement of Wyględowo-Kościesze. It was originally formed from two settlements, Wyględowo and Kościesze, with the latter being originally part of the nearby Rakowiec. In the late 19th century to the north the Imperial Russian Army has built the Fort M as part of the city fortifications. The area was incorporated into the city of Warsaw in 1916. In the late 1930s, a neighbourhood of detached houses was built around the Fort M. In 1950, the State Medical Institute of the Ministry of Interior and Administration was founded in Wyględów. In the late 1960s and early 1970s, a neighbourhood of apartment buildings was developed in southeastern Wyględów. In the 2000s and 2010s, several modernist housing estates of apartment buildings were developed in central and northern Wyględów.

== History ==
The oldest known records of the village of Wyględowo-Kościesze come from the early 16th century. It was a small farming community, owned and inhabited by petty nobility. It was formed from two settlements, Kościesze, which originally was a part of the village of Rakowiec, and Wyględowo, which was located in the area of the current Bełska Street.

On 13 January 1867, villages of Janków and Wyględów became part of the rural municipality of Pruszków, established as part of the administrative reform in the Kingdom of Poland.

In 1883, the Fort M was built at Racławicka Street near Wyględów. It was a part of the series of fortifications of the Warsaw Fortress, built around the city by the Imperial Russian Army. From 1889 to 1892, it was used as a warehouse. In 1909, it was decided to phase out the fortifications due to the high maintenance costs. As such, Fort M was decommissioned and partially demolished, leaving only barracks and bunkers.

On 1 April 1916, Janków and Wyględów were incorporated into the city of Warsaw. By that time, the area also featured the hamlet of Janków, lacated near the current intersection of Woronicza and Żwirki i Wigury Street.

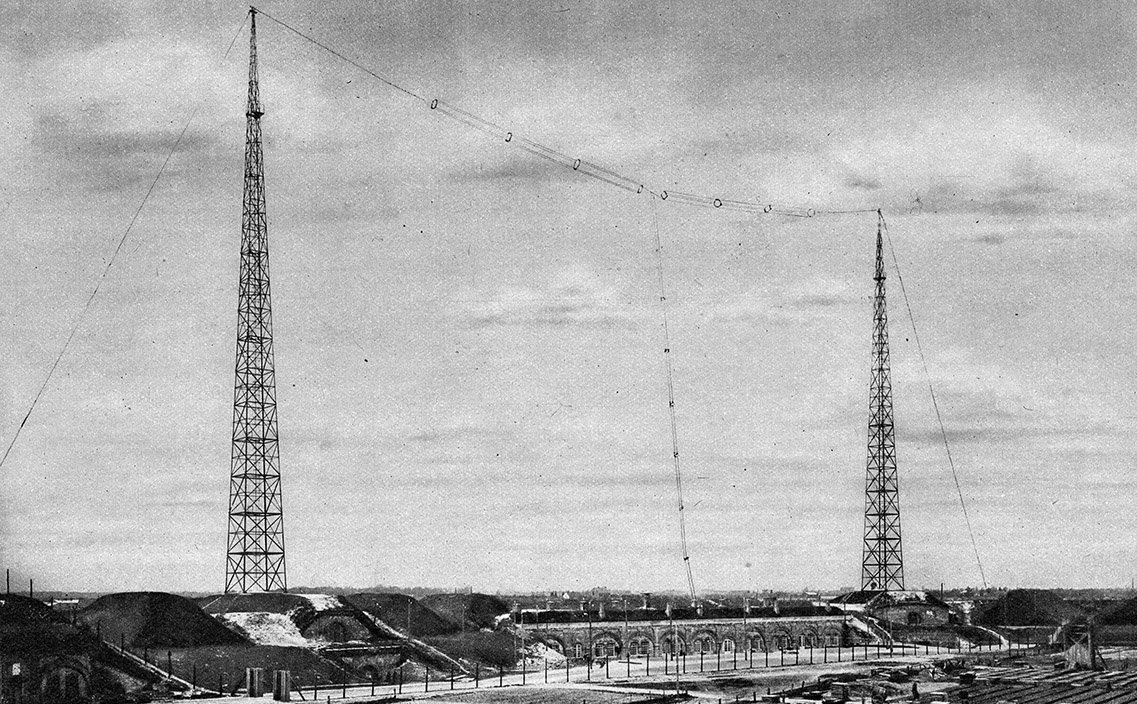
The broadcasting stations in Fort M in 1926.

In 1925, the broadcasting stations of Polish Radio was installed in the Fort M. In the late 1930s, a neighbourhood of single-family detached homes for the officers of the Polish Armed Forces, was developed around the fortification by the Dom Officer Housing Association.

In 1929, a palm house and greenhouses were opened at 11 Chodkiewicza Street for Zakład Hodowli Roślin (Plant Cultivation Works), making it the first complex of its kind in Warsaw. The buildings were destroyed in 1944 during the Warsaw Uprising, and the palm house was rebuilt nearby, at 4 Biały Kamień Street. It was rebuilt and modernized in 2009.

The Fort M was heavily bombarded during the siege of Warsaw on September 1939. It was attacked on 25 September by the 10th Infantry Division of Wehrmacht, and was captured the next day. During the occupation, it housed the headquarters of the Warsaw Airport Command, with a staff of 500 people. During the Warsaw Uprising in 1944, German units were able to hold the fort and subsequently used it for offensive attacks against the insurgents based in Mokotów.

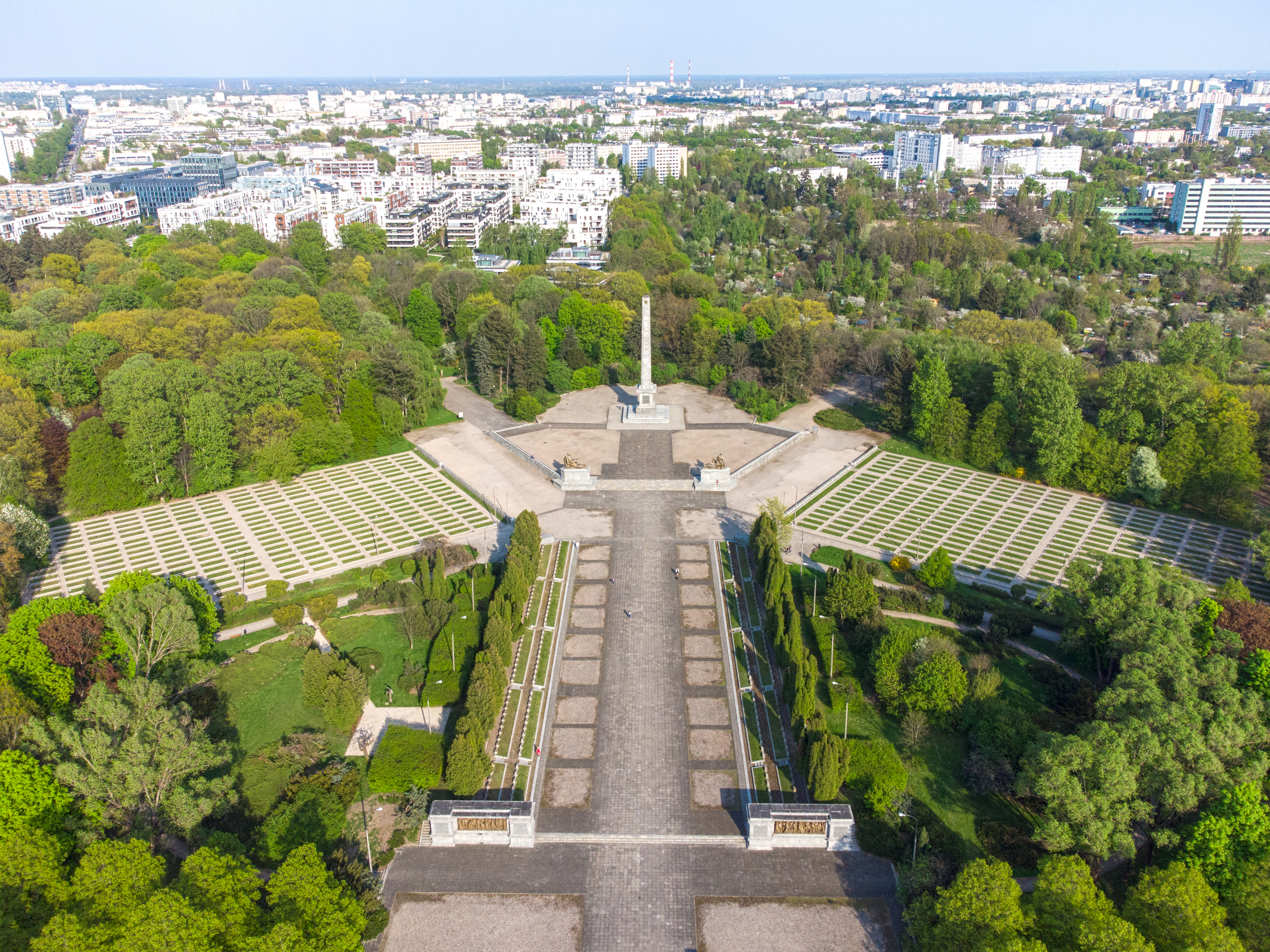
The Mausoleum Cemetery of the Soviet Soldiers opened in 1950.

In 1950, the Mausoleum Cemetery of the Soviet Soldiers was opened at 51 Żwirki i Wigury Street, as a burial place for over 21,000 soldiers of the Red Army, who died during the Second World War. It became the first monument in Warsaw dedicated to soldiers who died in the conflict, and the largest cemetery dedicated to the Soviet soldiers in Poland.

In 1951, the Central Clinical Hospital of the Ministry of Interior (now known as the State Medical Institute of the Ministry of Interior and Administration), was opened at 137 Wołoska Street. In 1962, the National Institute of Geriatrics, Rheumatology and Rehabilitation was also opened at 1 Spartańska Street.

In 1967, the Gwardia Warsaw multi-sport club began using a sports complex at 132 Racławicka Street as its headquarters. It included an association football field, which became its station. From 1972 to 1985, the complex also included a public swimming pool. From 1993 to 1996, and from 1999 to 2003, it also served a motorcycle speedway venue. The sports complex was closed down in 2012, with the club moving to a different venue. Currently, it is planned to build in its place the new headquarters building for Frontex, an agency of the European Union, which exercises the border control of the Schengen Area.

Between 1968 and 1973, the Politechnika Construction and Housing Association (Polish: Spółdzielnia Budowlano-Mieszkaniowa „Politechnika”) built a neighbourhood of apartment buildings, located at Bełska, Etiudy Rewolucyjnej, Malawskiego, Maklakiewicza, and Miączyńska Streets. Between 1998 and 2001, the order of Salvatorians built the Church of the Holy Virgin Mary the Mother of Saviour at 82 and 84 Olimpijska Street.

In 1999, the building of the Faculty of Materials Science and Engineering of the Warsaw University of Technology was opened at 141 Wołoska Street. Between 2003 and 2006, a gated community known as Marina Mokotów, was developed in the southwestern portion of Wyględów, between Żwirki i Wigury, Racławicka, Miłobędzka, Etiudy Rewolucyjnej, and Woronicza Streets. It consisted of modernist apartment buildings, which could house around 5,000 people. An artificial pond was also created in the neighbourhood. Between 2002 and 2013, a collection of five housing estates, known as Eko Park was developed in the northeastern portion of Wyględów. It consisted of modernist apartment buildings.

In March 2020, as part of the measures taken during the COVID-19 pandemic, the Central Clinical Hospital of the Ministry of Interior and Administration was converted to specialise in treating the disease. In December 2020, the hospital staff became first people in Poland to receive the COVID-19 vaccine. In January 2023, the hospital was transformed into the State Medical Institute of the Ministry of Interior and Administration. Aside from providing healthcare, it also became a research institute. Additionally, it was designated to provide healthcare to the most important people in the government, including the president and the prime minister, as well as international delegates.

== Characteristics ==
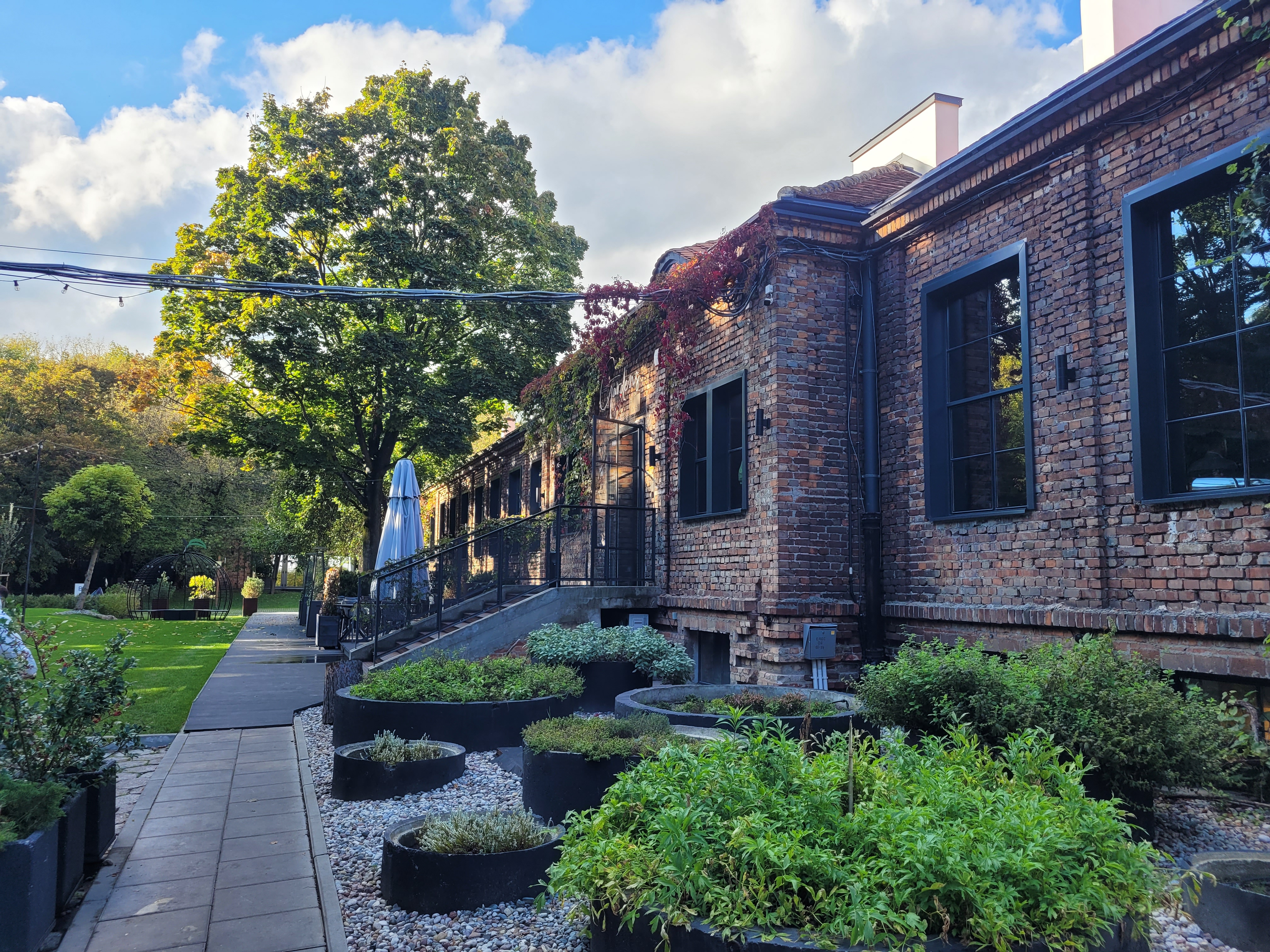
A restaurant in the historical Fort M.

Wyględów is predominantly a residential area. Its southeaatern portion consists of apartment buildings, most of which are owned by the Politechnika Construction and Housing Association (Polish: Spółdzielnia Budowlano-Mieszkaniowa „Politechnika”). Its central eastern portion forms a low-rise neighbourhood of semi-detached and detached housess, concentrated in the area of Racławicka Street. Its southeastern area portion between Racławiscka, Etiudy Rewolucyjnej, Woronicza, and Żwirki i Wigury Streets, forms a gated community of modernist apartment buildings, known as Mariana Mokotów. It also includes a large artificial pond. The northeastern portion of Wyględów consists of five housing estates of modernist apartment buildings, known as Eko Park.

Wyględów features the Fort M, decommissioned 19th-century fortifications, located in its centre, at 99 Racławicka Street. Currently, it forms a park and recreational complex, with restaurants and event venues. The neighbourhood also includes a small portion of the Mokotów Field park complex, located in its north, near Rostafińskich Street, as well as the Mokotów Palm House at 4 Biały Kamień Street, which contains numerous exotic plants, including over-century-old palm trees and figs.

Moreover, Wyględów also features the Mausoleum Cemetery of the Soviet Soldiers, located at 51 Żwirki i Wigury Street, which is burial ground for over 21,000 soldiers of the Red Army, who died during the Second World War. It is the largest cemetery dedicated to the Soviet soldiers in Poland. It also includes a 21-metre-tall (68.89 ft.) granite obelisk, and two sculptures of soldiers, Heroism by Jerzy Jarnuszkiewicz, and Sacrifice by Władysław Niemirski. Additionally, the neighbourhood also has the Holy Virgin Mary the Mother of Saviour Church at 82 and 84 Olimpijska Street, which belongs to the Catholic denomination, operated by the order of Salvatorians.

Wygledów also includes the State Medical Institute of the Ministry of Interior and Administration, located at 137 Wołoska Street, which operates as the hospital and medical research institute. It is also designated to provide healthcare to the most important people in the national government, including the president and the prime minister, as well as international delegates. Additionally, the neighbourhood also has the National Institute of Geriatrics, Rheumatology and Rehabilitation at 1 Spartańska Street.

Furthermore, the building of the Faculty of Materials Science and Engineering of the Warsaw University of Technology, is located at 141 Wołoska Street within the neighbourhood.

== Location and boundaries ==
Wygledów is a City Information System area in Warsaw, located within the north-western portion of the Mokotów district. To the north, its border is determined by a line stretched between the intersection of Banacha Street and Żwirki i Wigury Street, and the intersection of the Batorego Street and Boboli Street; the east, by Boboli Street, and Wołoska Street; to the south, by Woronicza Street, and in the straight line between Miś Roundabout to the tracks of the railway line no. 8, and following the it to the western boundary; and to the west, by Żwirki and Wigury Street.

The neighbourhood borders Filtry to the north, Old Mokotów, and Wierzbno to the east, Ksawerów to the south-east, Okęcie, and Służewiec to the south, and Rakowiec to the west. Its northern and western boundaries form the border of Mokotów district with Ochota to the north, and Włochy to the west.
