= Pole Mokotowskie metro station =

Warsaw metro station

Pole Mokotowskie
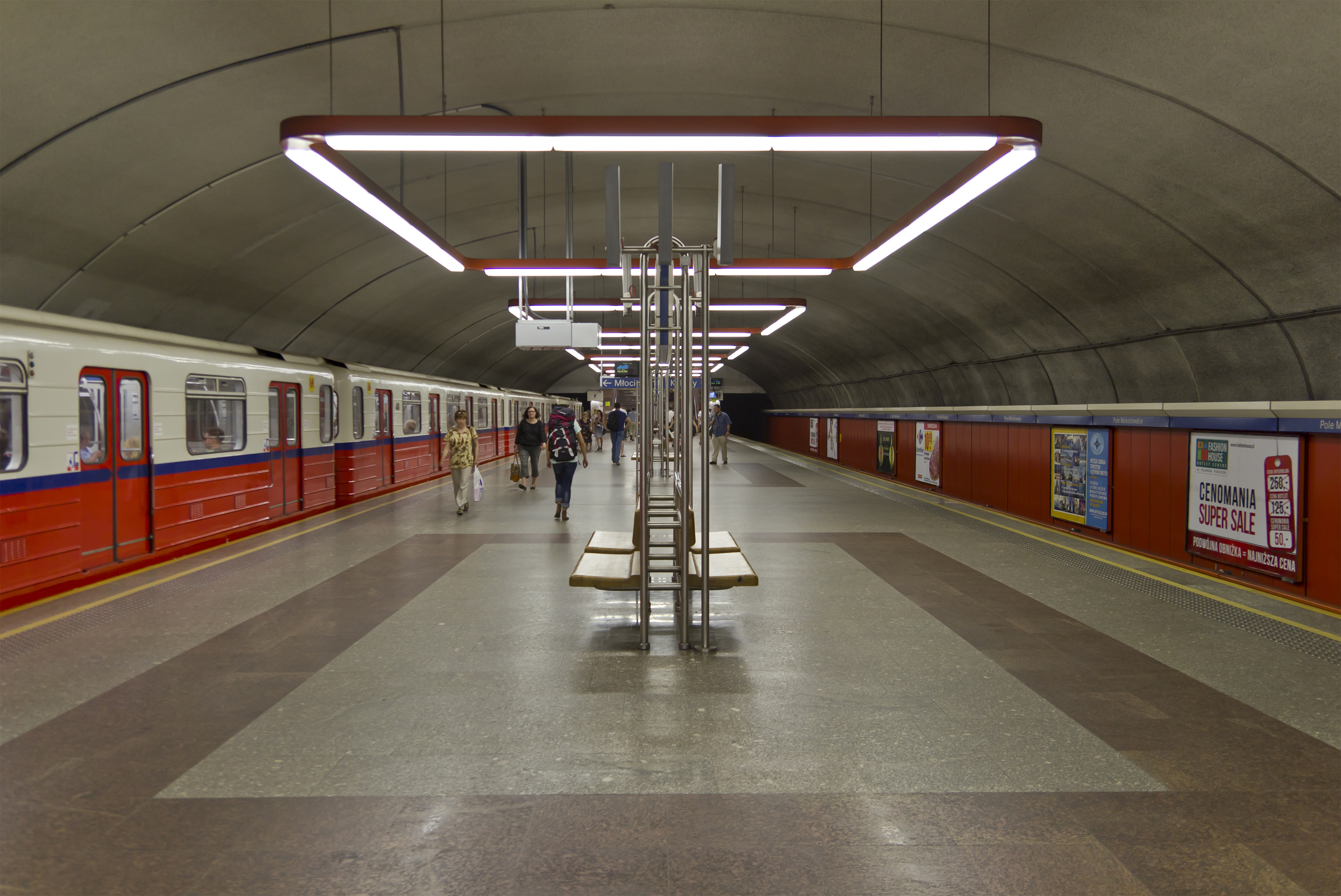

General information
- Coordinates: 52°12′31″N 21°0′28″E
- Owner: Public Transport Authority
- Platforms: 1 island platform
- Tracks: 2
- Connections: 168, 174; N34, N36; 17, 33

Construction
- Structure type: Underground
- Platform levels: 1
- Accessible: Yes

Other information
- Station code: A-10
- Fare zone: 1

History
- Opened: 7 April 1995; 31 years ago

Services
Preceding station	Warsaw Metro	Following station
Politechnika towards Młociny	M1 line	Racławicka towards Kabaty
Location
- Location within Warsaw

Metro Pole Mokotowskie is a station on Line M1 of the Warsaw Metro, located in the Mokotów district of Warsaw. It is named after the Pole Mokotowskie park nearby. It is located very close to the Warsaw School of Economics.

The station was opened on 7 April 1995 as part of the inaugural stretch of the Warsaw Metro, between Kabaty and Politechnika.

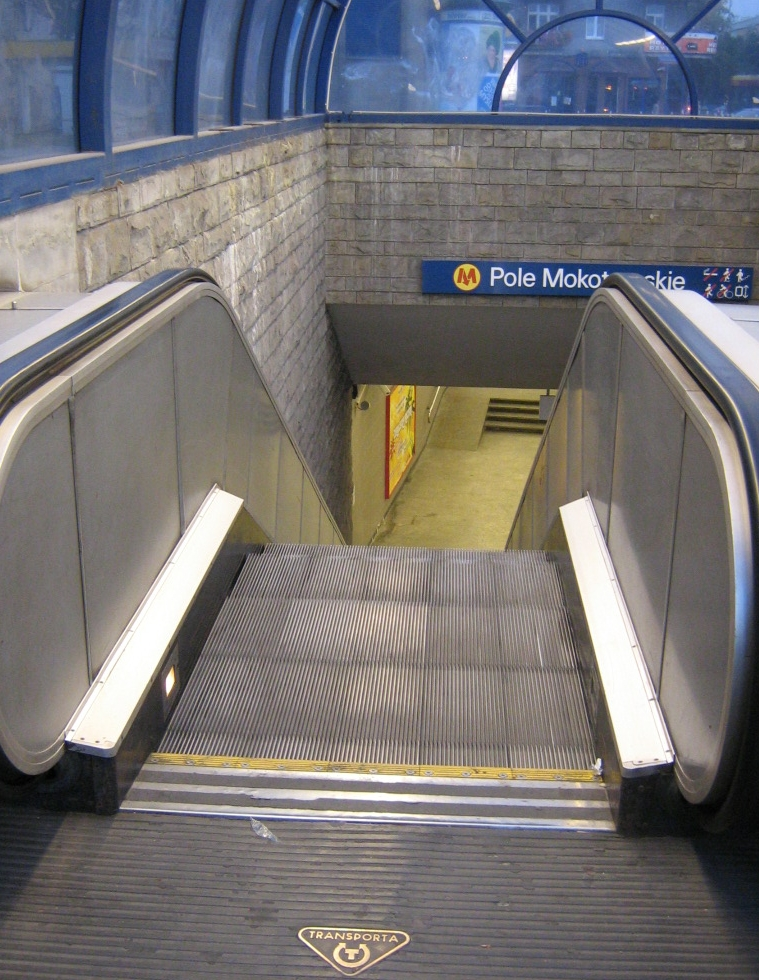
An escalator at the station entrance
