= Blacksmithing Museum =

Museum in Warsaw, Poland

The Blacksmithing Museum in Warsaw
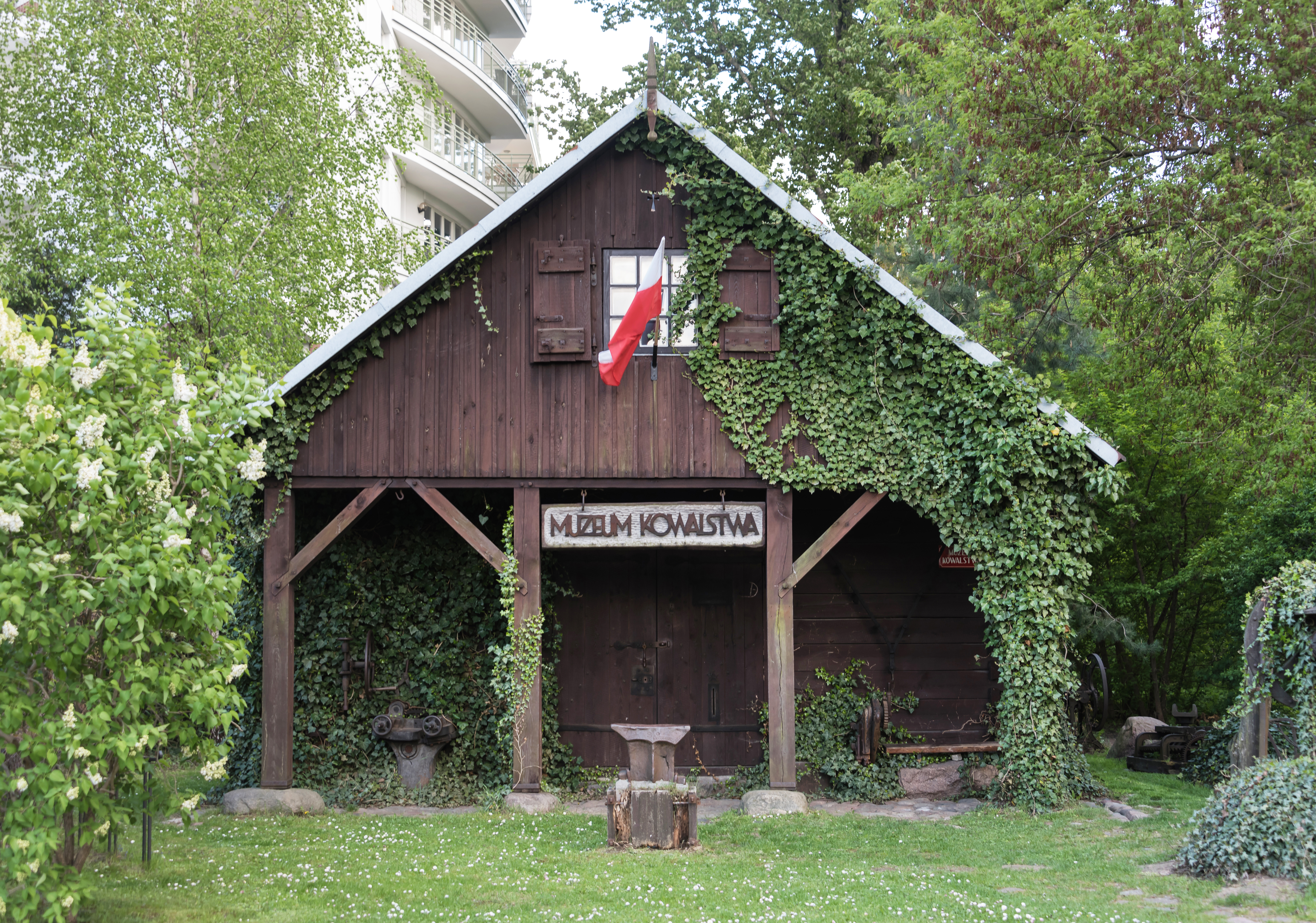
- Location: Przy Grobli 84, Warsaw, Poland

The Blacksmithing Museum (Muzeum Kowalstwa) operates as a private museum in Warsaw, founded by Eleonora and Zdzisław Gałecki in the early 1990s. Master blacksmith Kamil Gałecki runs the museum as its current operator. The museum features a 30 m² wooden oak-frame smithy, constructed using dovetail joints. The interior space of the museum showcases equipment which was commonly found in early 20th-century suburban Mazovian smithies. The institution stands as the sole Polish museum with a statute approved by the Minister of Culture and National Heritage. The museum is located at 84 Przy Grobli Street, on the border of Dolinka Służewiecka in Warsaw's Mokotów district.

== History ==
The smithy at Dolinka Służewiecka was established by Zdzisław Benedykt Gałecki, a blacksmith master, graduate of the Academy of Fine Arts in Toruń, Master of Arts, and a member of the Polish Association of Visual Artists. Master carpenter Władysław Pyza built the structure during the 1980s.

The smithy transformed during the late 1990s, transitioning from a traditional artistic workshop to a public facility. Eleonora and Zdzisław Gałecki initiated the conversion of this space into Poland's first private museum of its kind. The museum operates under a statute which the Minister of Culture and National Heritage approved to preserve the historical legacy of the former Służew smithy, which stands as one of the oldest in Mazovia.

== The Night of Museums in Warsaw ==
The smithy participates annually in Warsaw’s Night of Museums.

== Living history lessons ==
The museum regularly organises live history lessons for schools, organised groups and school trips. During the lessons, the comprehensive process of iron processing is presented live.

== Activity ==
The museum operates as a professional creative workshop, producing iron and metal applied art pieces, as well as designs and finishes for loft and industrial spaces. The facility operates independently, requiring no electricity. The workshop contains all the required equipment and tools (which serve as exhibits) necessary for artistic blacksmithing operations. The smithy produces a variety of items, including:

- Candlesticks
- Floor and hanging lamps
- Bookcases
- Shelves
- Stairs
- Mezzanines
- Railings
- Grilles
- Gates and fences
- Chairs
- Tables and coffee tables
- Loft furniture
- Industrial furniture
- Loft finishes
- Industrial finishes
- Emblems
- Sacred art:
  - Crosses
  - Tabernacles
  - Pulpits and lecterns
  - Offering boxes and alms boxes
  - Chandeliers and lighting fixtures
  - Railings and handrails
  - Liturgical tables
  - Presbytery elements and finishes
- Small architectural forms:
  - Flower stands
  - Benches
  - Railings
  - Garden pavilions

== Blacksmith Tools and Exhibits ==
The museum displays traditional blacksmith workshop tools and objects collected from various parts of Poland. Among the exhibits are.

- a blacksmith’s forge,
- a double-chamber blacksmith furnace,
- an air compression bellows from 1900,
- anvils – including a hornless anvil over 200 years old,
- a hand drill for making holes in metal,
- a blacksmith’s punch,
- vices,
- mallets,
- backfills,
- set of hammers,
- a workbench,
- blacksmith tongs,
- a tool cabinet,
- a sharpening stone mounted on a wooden stand for axes, hatchets, and swords,
- augers,
- carpenter’s axes,
- swords,
- emblems,
- agricultural devices and machinery,
- horse-powered mill,
- chaff cutter,
- plows,
- harrows,
- a wooden post for threading wagon axles,
- an upsetting press,
- a dovecote dove pale,
- a windlass,
- and a shrine dedicated to St. Joseph.

The museum also boasts a permanent exhibit showcasing blacksmithing tools, including temporary art exhibitions that draw inspiration from blacksmithing traditions.
