= Cyryl the Independent Cat =

Sculpture in Warsaw, Poland

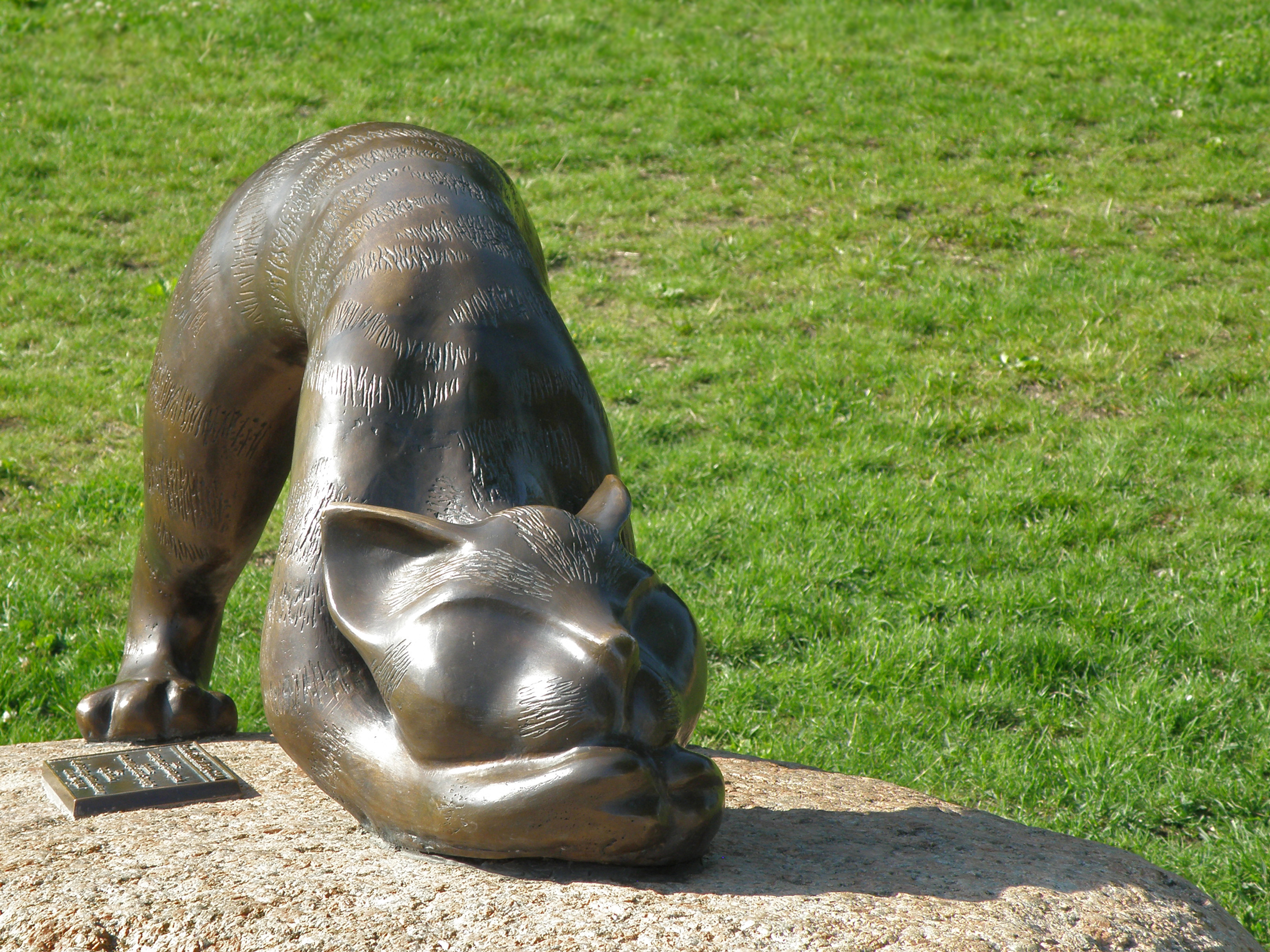
- The sculpture in 2012..
- Interactive map of Cyryl the Independent Cat
- Location: Balaton Park, Praga-South, Warsaw, Masovian Voivodeship, Poland
- Coordinates: 52°13′45.920″N 21°05′13.146″E
- Designer: Bogna Czechowska
- Type: Statue
- Material: Bronze
- Opening date: 29 May 2011

Cyryl the Independent Cat (Polish pronunciation: [ˈt͡sɘ̟.rɘ̟l]; Polish: Niezależny Kot Cyryl), also known as the Independent Cat Monument (Polish: Pomnik Niezależnego Kota), is a bronze statue of a cat in the city of Warsaw in Masovian Voivodeship, Poland. It is displayed in the Balaton Park, in the neighbourhood of Gocław within the Praga-South district. It was designed by Bogna Czechowska, and unveiled on 29 May 2011.

== History ==
The sculpture was proposed by the pet magazine Cztery Łapy, and financed by several pet food producers. It was designed by sculptor Bogna Czechowska, who previously also made the Happy Dog Monument, also proposed by the magazine. The name was chosen in an online vote. The sculpture was unveiled on 29 May 2011. Every year, in the anniversary of the event, the magazine Cztery Łapy gives "Cyryl" awards to people who help stray cats.

== Characteristics ==
The bronze sculpture depicts a stretching cat, with its head placed low, resting on its front paws, and its bottom risen up, and with a curled tail. It is placed on a boulder. The sculpture is meant to symbolise stray cats, as well as the human love and respect to animals. It is placed in the Balaton Park.

== Gallery ==
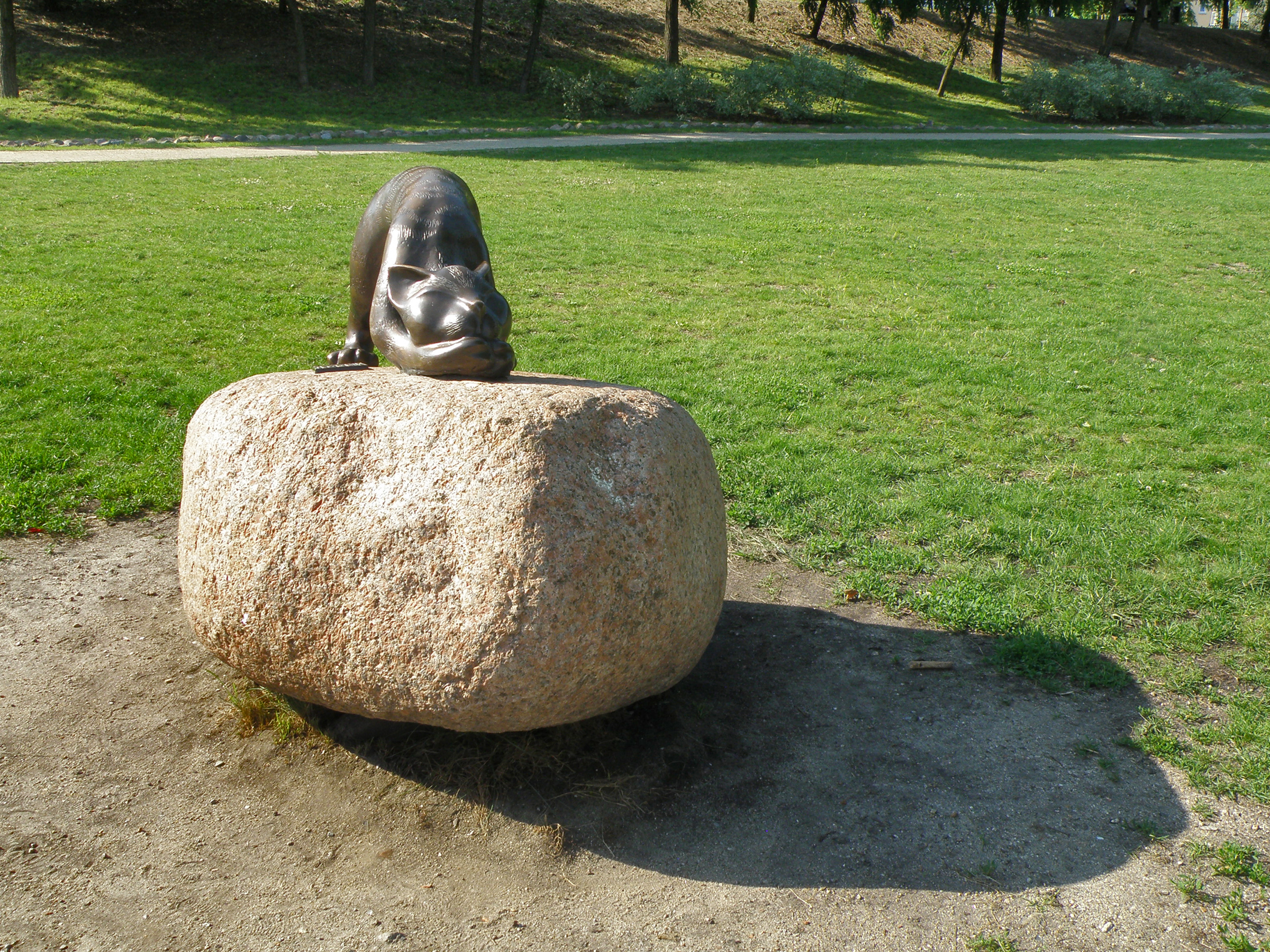
The sculpture on a rock pedestal in 2012.
