= State Medical Institute of the Ministry of Interior and Administration =

National Medical Institute of the Ministry of the Interior and Administration
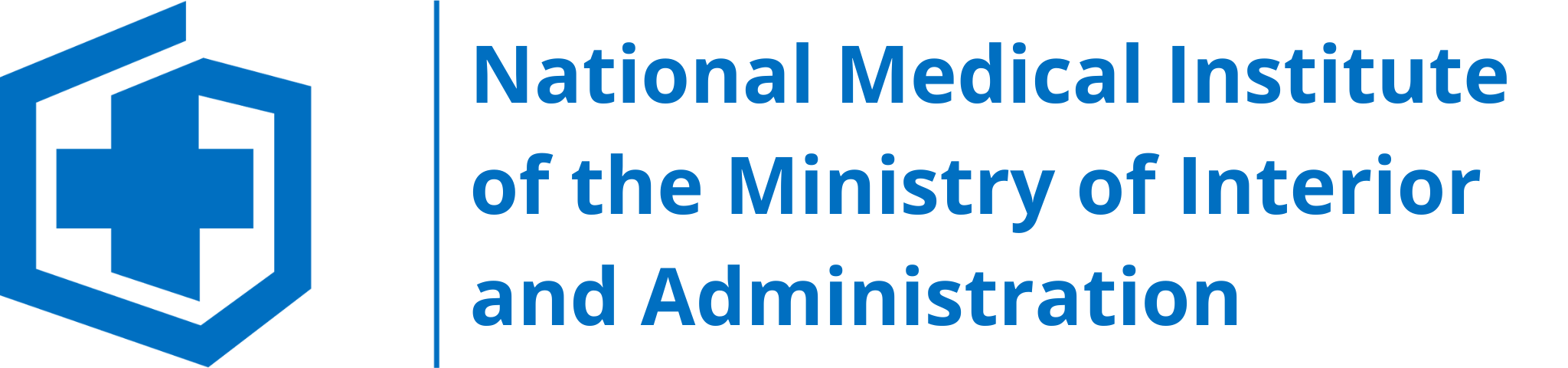

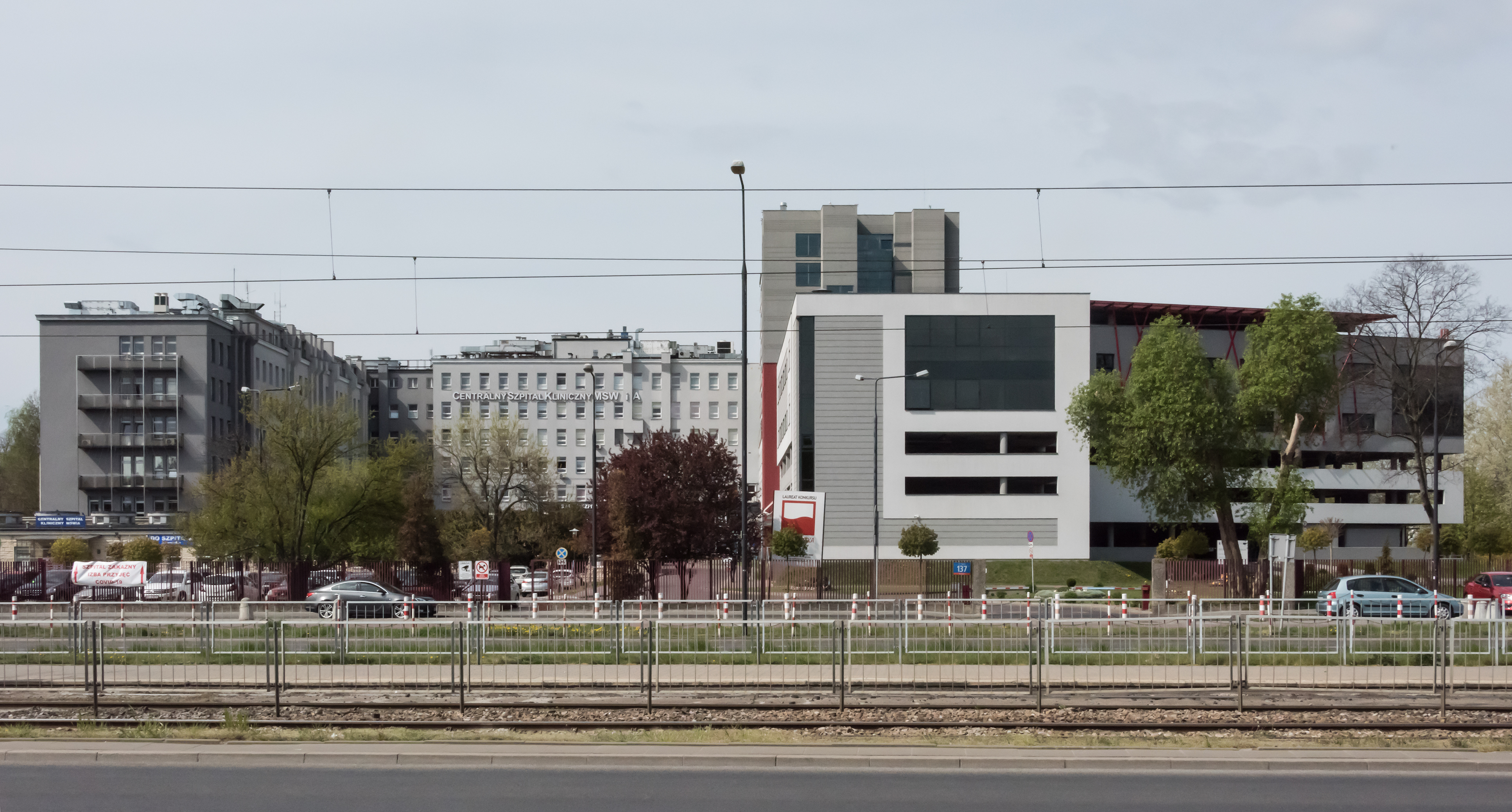

Geography
- Location: ul. Wołoska 137; 02-507 Warsaw, Poland
- Coordinates: 52°11′55″N 20°59′53″E

Organisation
- Type: public research institute

Services
- Beds: 1000

History
- Founded: October 8, 1951

Links
- Website: https://www.gov.pl/web/cskmswia
- Lists: Hospitals in Poland

The National Medical Institute of the Ministry of the Interior and Administration (Polish: Państwowy Instytut Medyczny Ministerstwa Spraw Wewnętrznych i Administracji; 1951–2022 known as Central Clinical Hospital of the Ministry of Interior and Administration in Warsaw; CSK) is a public research institute located in the Mokotów district of Warsaw, Poland.

== History ==
The building was designed by Julian Sadłowski, and organizational supervision was provided by Leon Gangel. The hospital's equipment was purchased from various Western European countries – surgical equipment from France, X-ray equipment from the UK and Germany. The hospital was opened on October 8, 1951. At that time, it had 7 departments (surgical, internal medicine, gynecological-obstetric, neonatal, dermatological, laryngological, and ophthalmological) and 3 laboratories (pathological anatomy, radiology, and physiotherapy).

From 1977 to 1979, 2 additional wings were added, allowing for the expansion of existing departments and the creation of 2 new internal medicine departments.

In 1998, it became part of the Independent Health Care Facilities Unit of the Capital City Health Service Board of the Ministry of Interior and Administration.

The Ministry of Health selected the hospital as the facility providing healthcare to the highest state authorities and the diplomatic corps.

The Institute manages the CSK MSWiA-Wołoska heliport, located on one of the buildings in the complex.

During the COVID-19 pandemic, the hospital was transformed by the Ministry of Health into an infectious disease hospital. Within the CSK structure, the National Hospital for COVID-19 treatment was established at the National Stadium.

On January 1, 2023, the Act of December 15, 2022 on the National Medical Institute of the Ministry of Interior and Administration came into force, transforming the hospital into the National Medical Institute of the Ministry of Interior and Administration. In addition to healthcare activities, the institute became a research entity conducting research and development work related to the healthcare services provided in the area of internal security of the state, with particular emphasis on the health needs and specifics of the uniformed services personnel under the jurisdiction of the minister competent for internal affairs
