= Happy Dog Monument =

Statue in Warsaw, Poland

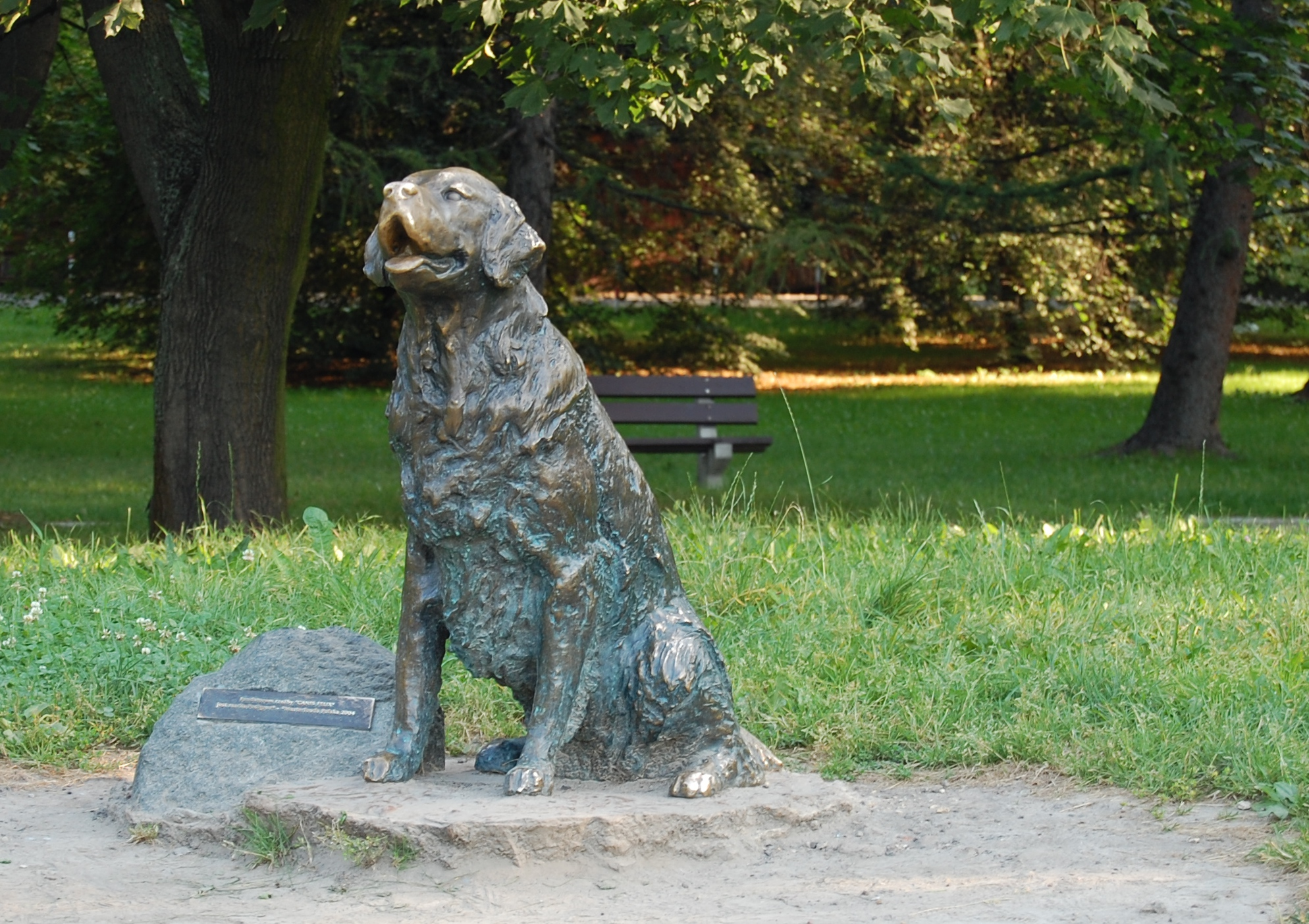
- The statue in 2009
- Interactive map of Happy Dog Monument
- Location: Mokotów Field, Ochota, Warsaw, Poland
- Coordinates: 52°12′40″N 20°59′34″E
- Designer: Bogna Czechowska
- Type: Statue
- Opening date: 2 October 2004

The Happy Dog Monument (Polish: Pomnik Szczęśliwego Psa) is a statue of a Golden Retriever dog in Warsaw, Poland, placed in the Mokotów Field park complex, within the district of Ochota. It was designed by Bogna Czechowska, and unveiled on 2 October 2004.

== History ==
The monument was designed by Bogna Czechowska, and proposed by Cztery Łapy ("Four Paws") pet magazine. It was unveiled on 2 October 2004, during the Warsaw Dog Parade organised by the magazine on the occasion of the World Animal Day celebrations.

The statue is placed in the Mokotów Field park complex. It depicts a sitting Golden Retriever dog, based on an individual therapy dog named Lokat. The idea behind the monument was to depict a loved, happy animal. Czechowska explained the choice of the dog breed: "the main character trait of this breed is the desire to please its owner. It is gentle and learns quickly. If its energy and willingness to work are properly harnessed, it truly feels happy."
