= Memorial to the Polish Aviators Fallen Between 1939 and 1945 =

Monument in Warsaw, Poland

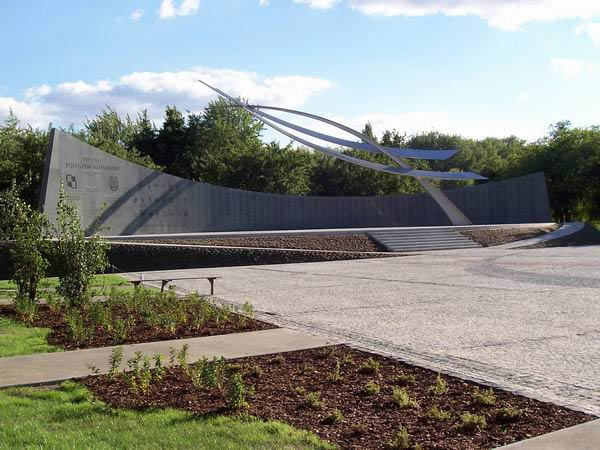
- The monument in 2007
- Interactive map of Memorial to the Polish Aviators Fallen Between 1939 and 1945
- Location: Mokotów Field, Downtown, Warsaw, Poland
- Coordinates: 52°12′58.26″N 21°00′33.30″E
- Designer: Marek Roger Dziewulski; Tadeusz Antoni Dziewulski
- Type: Statue
- Material: granite, stainless steel
- Opening date: 27 August 2003

The Memorial to the Polish Aviators Fallen Between 1939 and 1945 (Polish: Pomnik ku czci Lotników Polskich Poległych w latach 1939–1945) is a monument in Warsaw, Poland, located in the Mokotów Field park complex, near People's Army Avenue, within the South Downtown neighbourhood. It is dedicated to the 2118 aviators of the Polish Air Force, who were killed during the Second World War. The monument was designed by Marek Roger Dziewulski and Tadeusz Antoni Dziewulski, and unveiled on 27 August 2003. It consists of a granite wall with memorial inscriptions, and a modernist sculpture from stainless steel, depicting three intertwining contrails, as seen during an aerial combat between fighter planes.

== History ==
The monument was proposed by the Polish Airmen's Association of the United Kingdom, and designed by Marek Roger Dziewulski and Tadeusz Antoni Dziewulski. The latter was a pilot of the No. 315 Polish Fighter Squadron.

It was unveiled on 27 August 2003 by President of Poland Aleksander Kwaśniewski, on the eve of the Polish Aviation Day. The monument is dedicated to 2118 aviators of the Polish Air Force, who were killed during the Second World War, including in the Invasion of Poland, Battle of France, and Battle of Britain. Its placement in the Mokotów Field park complex was chosen, as it was a location of the former Mokotów Aerodrome in the 20th century.

== Design ==
The monument consists of a long curved and granite wall, with an rounded concave towards its centre. It bears inscriptions of 2118 aviators of the Polish Air Force, fallen in the Second World War, as well as names of their units, and a quote in Polish, which reads "Wolność należy do tych, którzy mają odwagę jej bronić", and translates to "The freedom belongs to those, brave enough to protect it". In front of its stands a modernist sculpture from stainless steel, depicting three intertwining contrails, as seen during an aerial combat between fighter planes. One of the contrails rises upward, symbolizing the victory of a Polish pilot in an aerial battle.
