= Mausoleum Cemetery of the Soviet Soldiers =

War cemetery in Poland

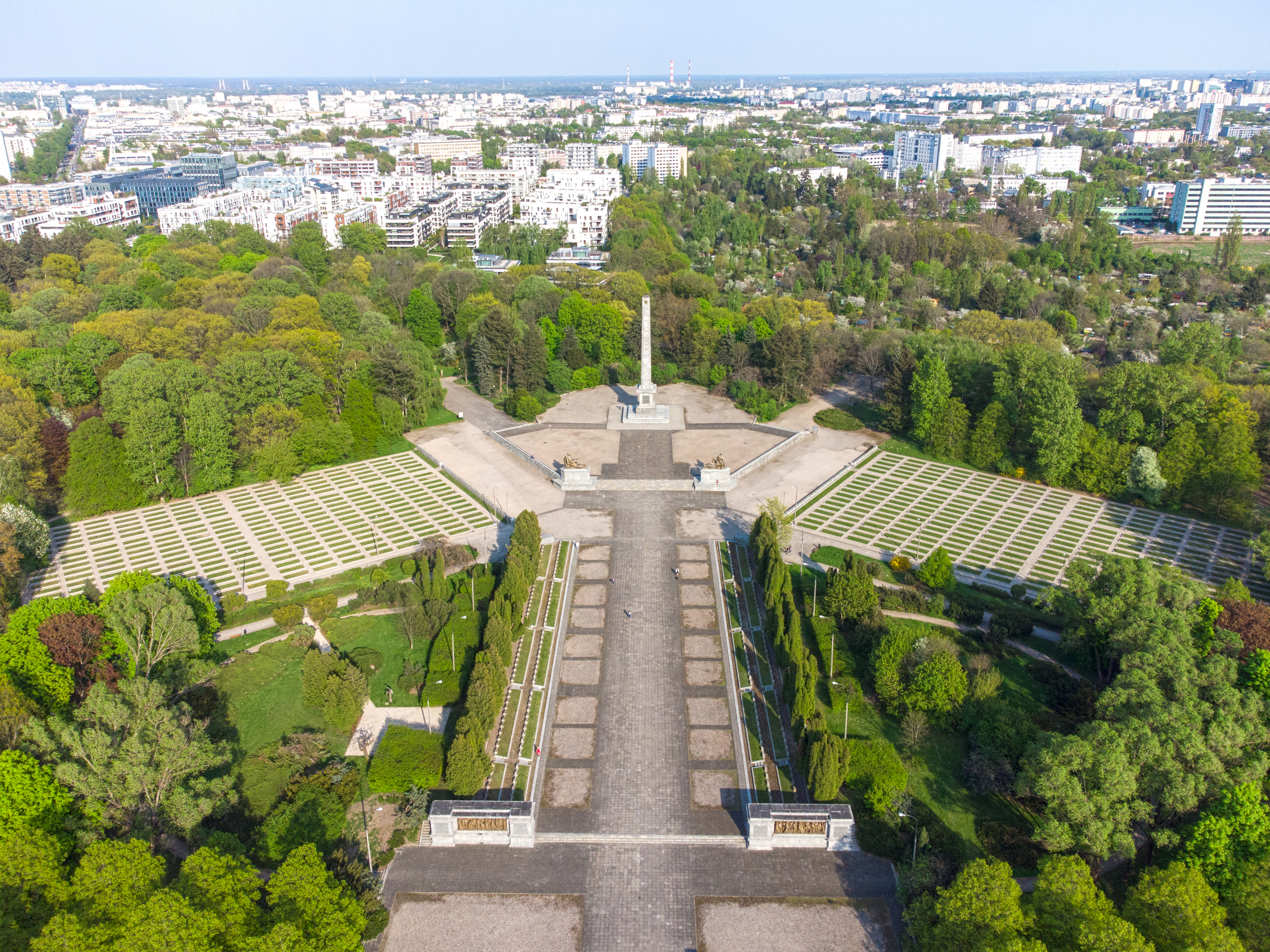
- Aerial view of cemetery main passage from the west. Soldiers' mass graves lie to the sides of the obelisk.

Details
- Established: 9 May 1950
- Location: ul. Żwirki i Wigury 51; Mokotów, Warsaw, Mazovian Voivodeship
- Country: Poland
- Coordinates: 52.2025°N 20.9867°E
- Type: Military
- Style: Socialist realism
- Size: 19.2 hectares (47 acres)
- No. of graves: 834; 294 individual and 540 mass graves
- No. of interments: 21,668

The Mausoleum Cemetery of the Soviet Soldiers (Polish: Cmentarz Mauzoleum Żołnierzy Radzieckich) in Warsaw, Poland, is the burial place of over 21,000 Soviet soldiers who died fighting against Nazi Germany. It is the largest Soviet war cemetery in Poland and contains one of the first major monuments to be built in Warsaw to those who fought in the Second World War. It is an example of socialist realist architecture.

== Inception ==
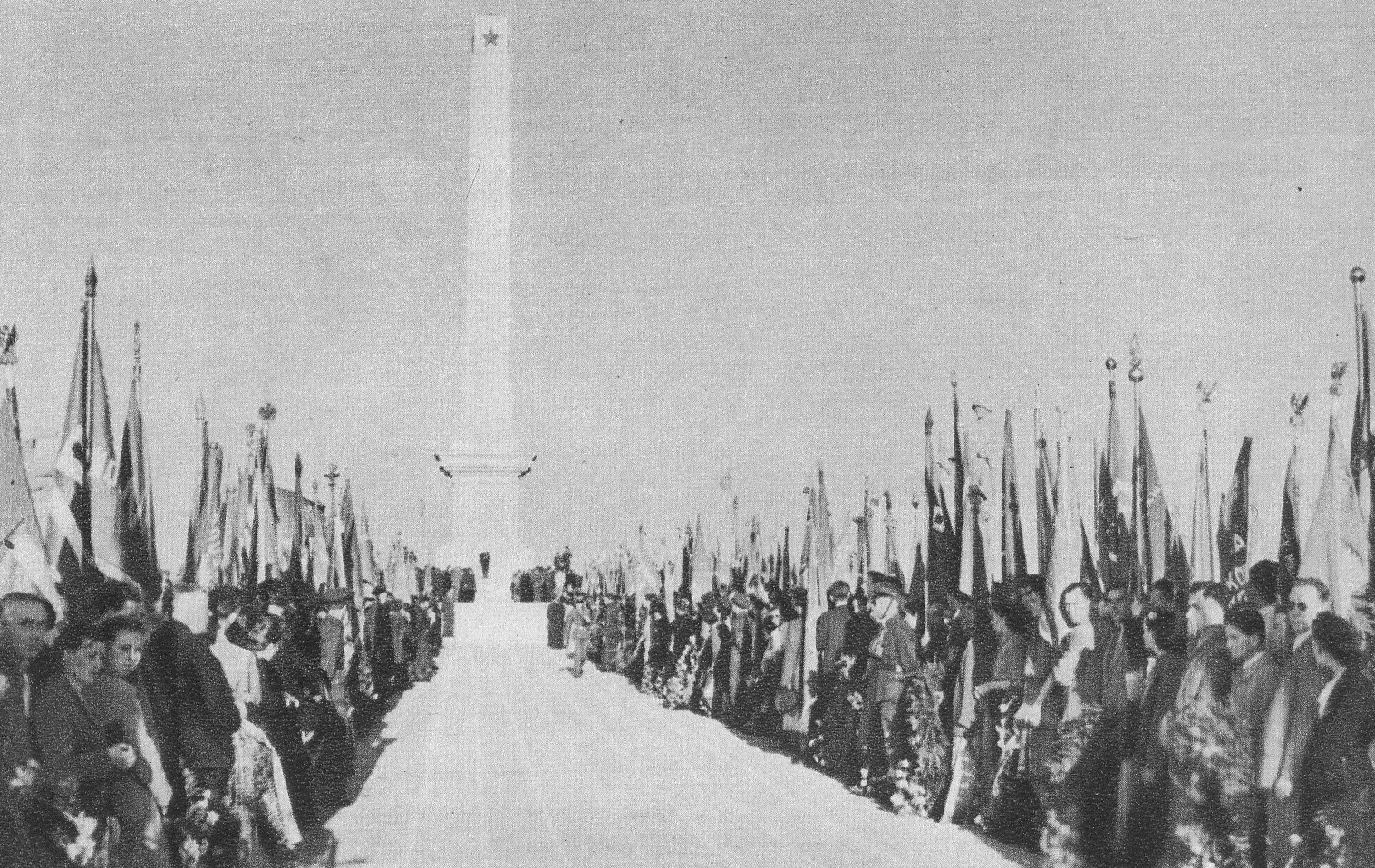
Ceremonial opening of the mausoleum on 9 May, 1950

The cemetery was built in 1949–1950, located in Warsaw's Mokotów district. It contains the ashes of 21,668 soldiers of the 1st Belarusian Front who died either in battle or as a result of injury and/or disease sustained during battles for Warsaw against armies of the Third Reich in 1944–1945. Their ashes were exhumed from local cemeteries and transferred to the mausoleum in 1949. The necropolis was designed by architects Bohdan Lachert (who planned the general layout) and Władysław Niemirski (who worked on the greenery), whereas its monumental sculptures were made by Jerzy Jarnuszkiewicz and Stanisław Lisowski.

The mausoleum was opened on the 5th Victory Day (9 May 1950), which since 2015 is celebrated in Poland on 8 May instead of the previously used date of 9 May. Troops from the following formations of the 1st Belarusian Front are buried here:

- 8th Guards Army
- 28th, 47th, 48th, 65th, 69th, 70th Armies
- 2nd Guards Tank Army
- 6th and 16th Air Army
- 46th Marksmen Corps
- 2nd and 7th Cavalry Corps
- 1st Guards Tank Army

== Architecture ==
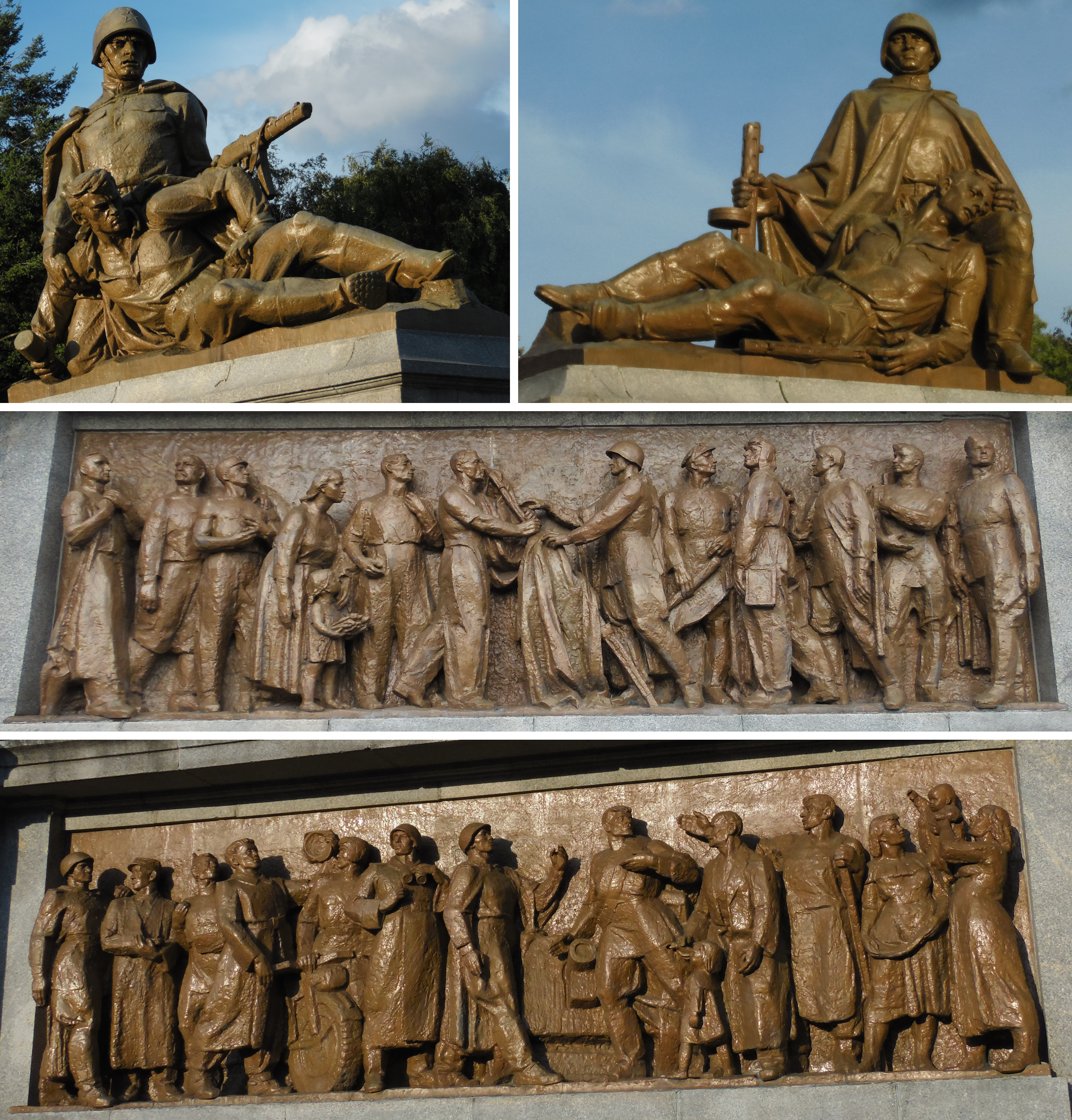
Details of sculptures

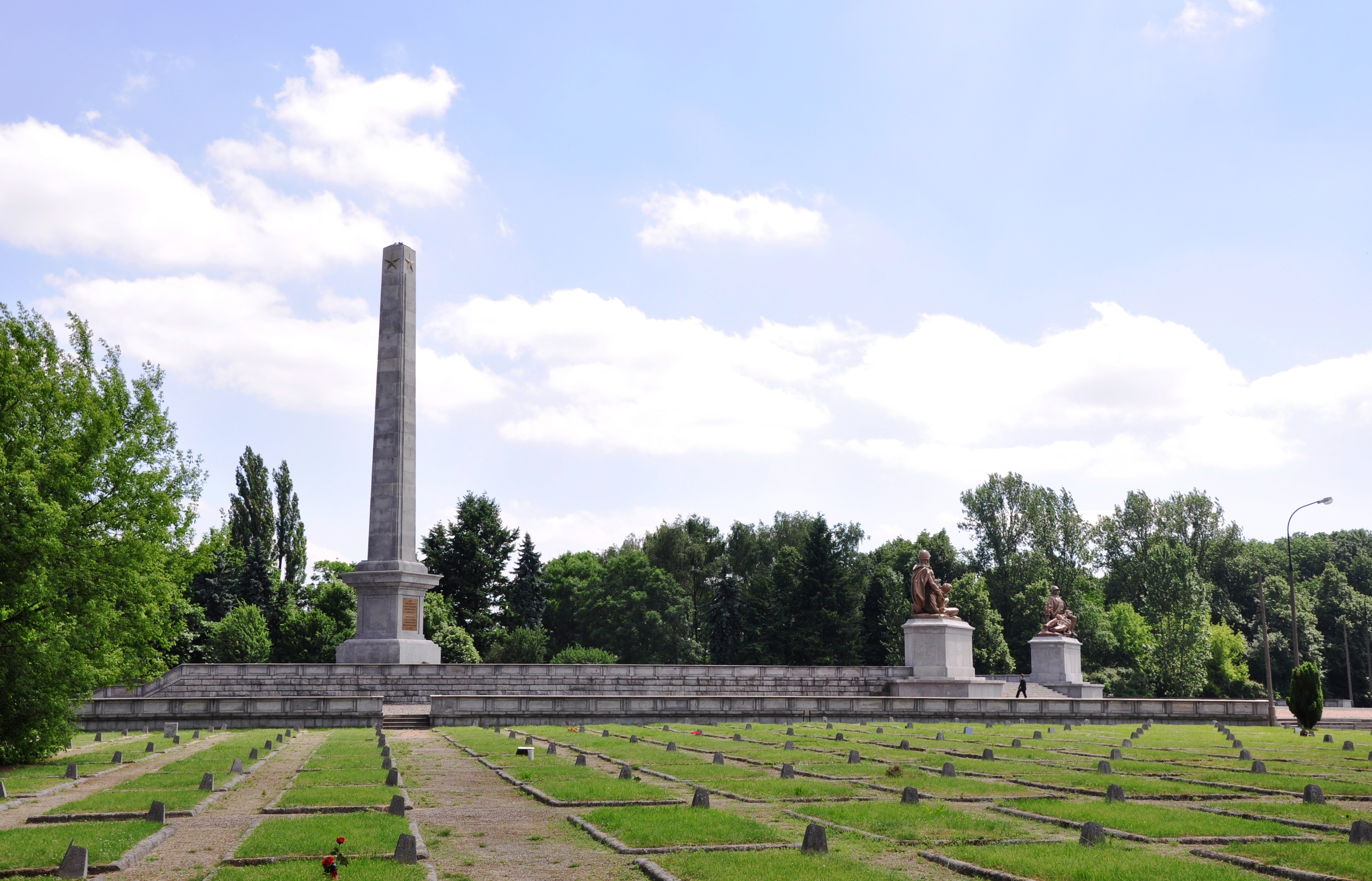
View from the side

=== Design ===
The Soviet Military Cemetery was constructed in a socialist realist style, which was common in countries of the Warsaw Pact at the time. This can be seen in Jarnuszkiewicz and Lisowski's sculptures of Red Army soldiers as well as reliefs showing workers with tools and other civilians greeting victorious soldiers near the main entrance to the complex. Ashes of the soldiers were buried in 834 graves, 294 of which are individual graves while the other 540 are mass graves. The central part of the cemetery is a wide avenue that leads through three terraces to a 35-metre-tall (115 ft) granite obelisk. The obelisk inscription, changed in 2015 (see Further developments section), originally read:

"Ku wiecznej chwale bohaterskich żołnierzy niezwyciężonej Armii Radzieckiej, poległych w bojach z hitlerowskim najeźdźcą o wyzwolenie Polski i naszej stolicy Warszawy." (Polish)
"To the eternal glory of heroic soldiers of the invincible Soviet Army, fallen in battles with the Hitlerite invader for the liberation of Poland and our capital Warsaw."

The cemetery dedication on the right side lists (in Polish) the units to which the dead belonged. The same dedication appears on the left, in Russian, along with another relief. The cemetery is surrounded by artistically composed greenery, the work of Władysław Niemirski, as well as a park.

=== Further developments ===
In 2015, the obelisk inscription was changed to

"Pamięci żołnierzy Armii Radzieckiej poległych o wyzwolenie Polski spod okupacji niemieckiej w latach 1944–1945." (Polish)
"To the memory of Soviet Army soldiers fallen in liberating Poland from German occupation in the years 1944–1945."

In 2023, there were controversial plans to build tower blocks in the green area on the edge of the complex, plans that were being opposed by the Miasto Jest Nasze association. The greenery, which constitutes an important area in the natural system of Warsaw, was finally protected in September of the same year. This move effectively blocked the construction of the planned residential estate, thus preserving the gardens and natural environment around the mausoleum.

== Activism and vandalism in the 21st century ==
=== Remembrance and Reconciliation initiative ===
In the aftermath of the Smolensk air disaster of 2010, as part of a Polish initiative called 9 maja. Pamięć i Pojednanie ("9th May. Remembrance and Reconciliation"), personalities from the world of Polish culture, politics, science, and journalism appealed "against the relativising of history" and "for reconciliation between Poland and Russia to be born in the name of the memory of all those who died tragically"; signatories of the appeal included Agata Bielik-Robson, Włodzimierz Cimoszewicz, Rafał Dutkiewicz, Adam Michnik, Daniel Olbrychski, Wisława Szymborska, Józef Życiński, and many others. The initiative urged people to light grave candles on the graves of Red Army soldiers who had died while fighting against Nazi Germany in occupied Poland. The Varsovian mausoleum was one of the many cemeteries where this took place, with many Poles of various ages attending to pay their respects. Flowers were left and at least one candle was lit at every grave during this event, which was one of the largest visits to the mausoleum in years.

=== Vandalism and protests ===
Also in 2010, the cemetery was vandalised with graffiti sprayed on the base of some of the sculptures that in Polish said: "Tusk we want the truth about Smolensk"; the text addressed then Prime Minister of Poland Donald Tusk, referring to conspiracy theories surrounding the Smolensk air disaster that claimed the crash was an assassination of Polish government officials by the Russian authorities and that Tusk was apparently involved in covering it up. In the wake of Russian aggression against Ukraine that began with the War in Donbas, the mausoleum has been vandalised several times in the following years. However, official commemorations at the cemetery in 2014 proceeded without any disturbance.

In March 2017, the necropolis was vandalised again, this time by three unidentified people who left 15 instances of stencil graffiti around the complex; the graffiti showed a swastika on top of an Israeli flag with two red footprints on each side. The Russian Embassy as well as Poland's Ministry of Foreign Affairs and Ministry of Culture and National Heritage commented on the matter. Police began to guard the Soviet Military Cemetery as a result. In September of the same year, bases of the sculptures were yet again vandalised, this time sprayed with political slogans in Polish: "Death to traitors of the nation", "Paszoł won (Note: Paszoł won is a borrowing that is essentially a Polish phonetic spelling of the Russian phrase "пошёл вон", which means "begone" or "go away".) from our country", and "Stalin's flunkeys". Police stated that it was likely that the perpetrators committed the acts of vandalism on the 78th anniversary of the Soviet invasion of Poland.

In 2022, leading up to that year's Varsovian Victory Day celebrations, the mausoleum was vandalised with anti-Russian slogans (including the words "Kill Putin" sprayed in the colours of the Ukrainian flag). This was likely in connection with the Russian invasion of Ukraine, which had started less than three months prior, as the cemetery is attended annually by political representatives of the Russian Federation to commemorate the fallen Soviet soldiers. The graffiti was promptly removed by local authorities. 9th May celebrations at the cemetery were also disrupted by anti-war protests in 2023 and 2024.
