= Kino Iluzjon =

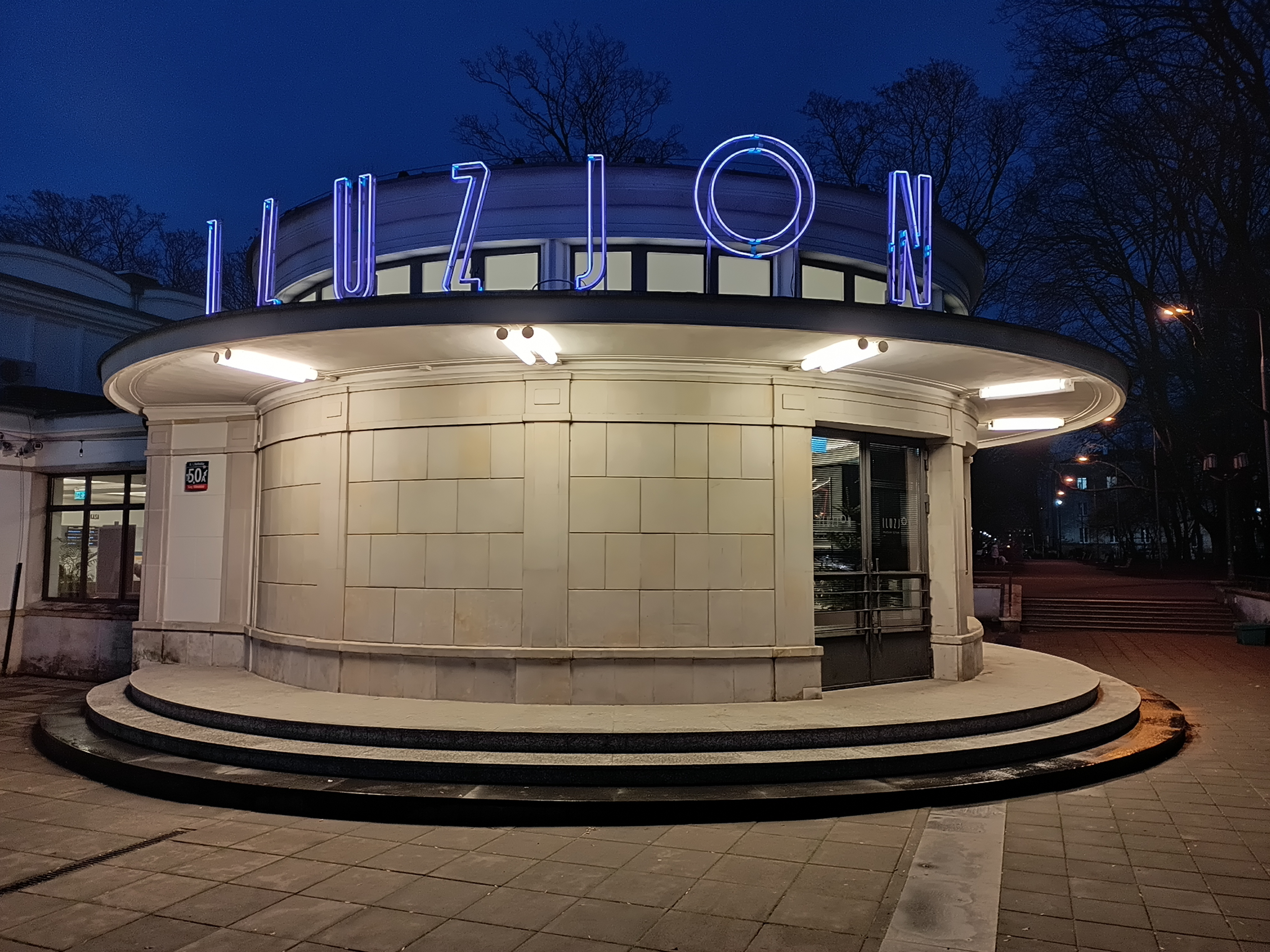
- Cinema frontage
- Interactive map of Kino Iluzjon
- Former names: Kino Stolica
- Coordinates: 52°12′20″N 21°00′38″E
- Type: Indoor movie theater

Construction
- Built: 1961-1962
- Architect: Mieczysław Piprek

Website
- www.iluzjon.fn.org.pl

Iluzjon – Museum of Film Art is an art-house cinema located at 50a Narbutta Street in Warsaw, Poland. It belongs to the National Film Archive - Audiovisual Institute. The repertoire includes classic films, film festivals, retrospectives, and special screenings.

== History ==
The beginnings of Iluzjon's activity date back to the second half of the 1950s. Iluzjon changed its location Iluzjon several times. Screenings took place at the Kultura cinema, the Aurora cinema, in the "Pod Kopułą" hall in the building of the State Planning Commission, at the Polonia cinema, and at the Śląsk cinema. Since February 1997, Cinema Iluzjon has been located in the building of the former Stolica cinema at 50a Narbutta Street. The building was designed in 1948 by Mieczysław Piprek, and constructed between 1949 and 1950.

Due to it being necessary to conduct a comprehensive renovation of the building, starting from January 2009, Cinema Iluzjon temporarily resumed its operations in the Stefan Demby Auditorium at the Polish National Library. It signed a 3-year contract with the National Library. The National Film Archive commenced the renovation of the cinema in May 2011. The investment aimed to transform the single-screen cinema into a multifunctional facility. In November 2012, Iluzjon cinema resumed its operations at 50a Narbutta Street in the newly renovated building.

The tumultuous history of Warsaw's art-house cinemas has often been accompanied by support from the community. During the summer of 2008, a petition was posted online to defend the cinema (then based in Kino Luna) against the threat of closure. Within a month of its launch, over 11,000 signatures were collected in support of maintaining the existence of the institution.
