= Mokotów Field =

Park in Warsaw, Poland

- Pole Mokotowskie
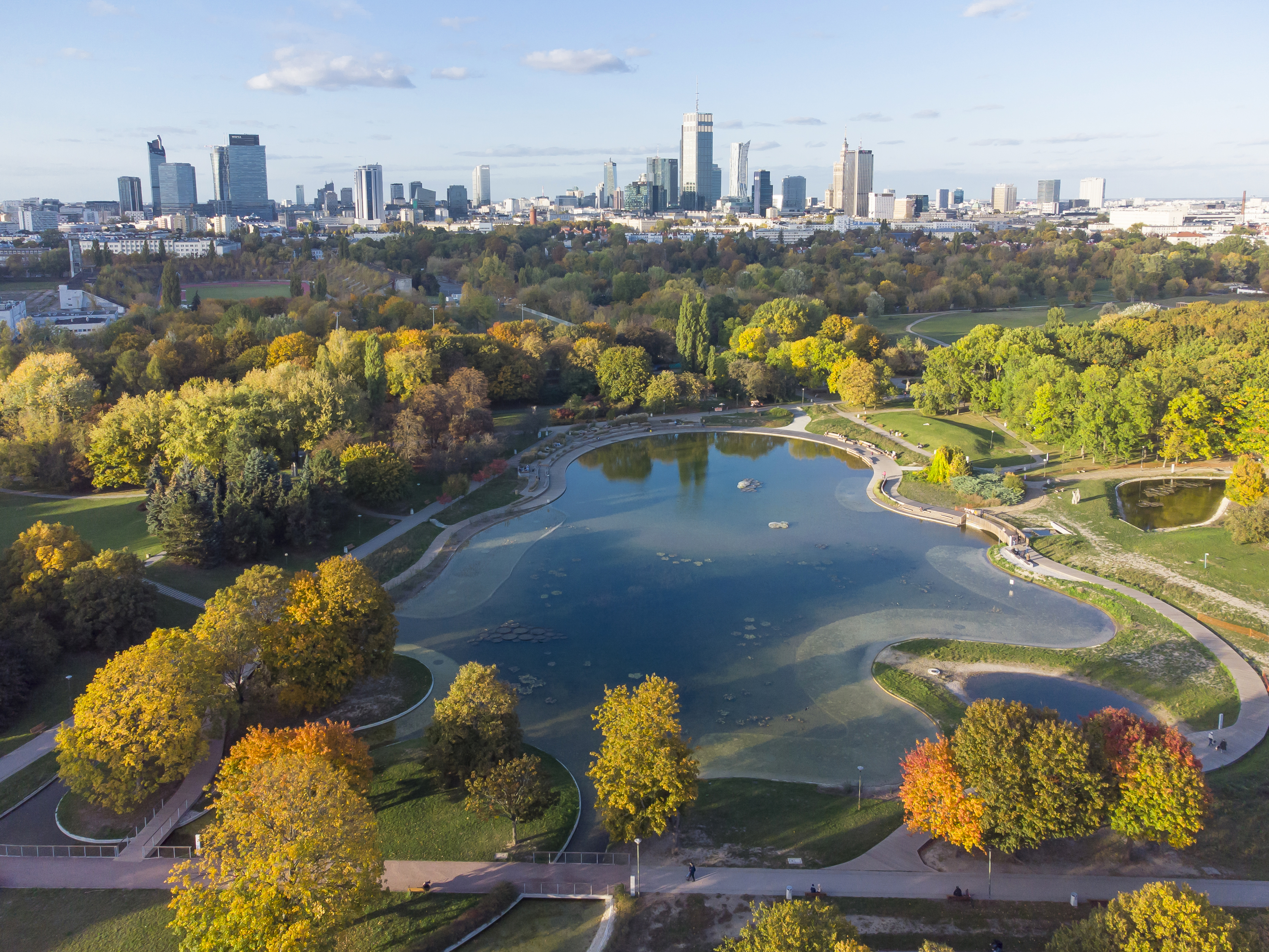
- Pond in the Mokotów Field in 2024
- Interactive map of Mokotów Field
- Type: Municipal
- Location: Warsaw
- Coordinates: 52°12′39″N 21°00′00″E
- Area: 73 hectares (180 acres)
- Designer: Stanisław Bolek
- Status: Open all year
- Public transit: Pole Mokotowskie

Mokotów Field (Polish: Pole Mokotowskie) is a large park in Warsaw, Poland.

Located between Warsaw's Mokotów district and the city center, the park is one of the largest in Warsaw. Only a small part of the modern Pole Mokotowskie is located in the Mokotów district. Most of the field (48.61 ha, almost 71%) is located in Ochota and Śródmieście.

Landmarks within the park include the Polish National Library and the Monument in Memory of the Fallen Polish Pilots in World War II. The park is also famous for its bars. To the south is a Warsaw Metro station, the Pole Mokotowskie station.

== History ==
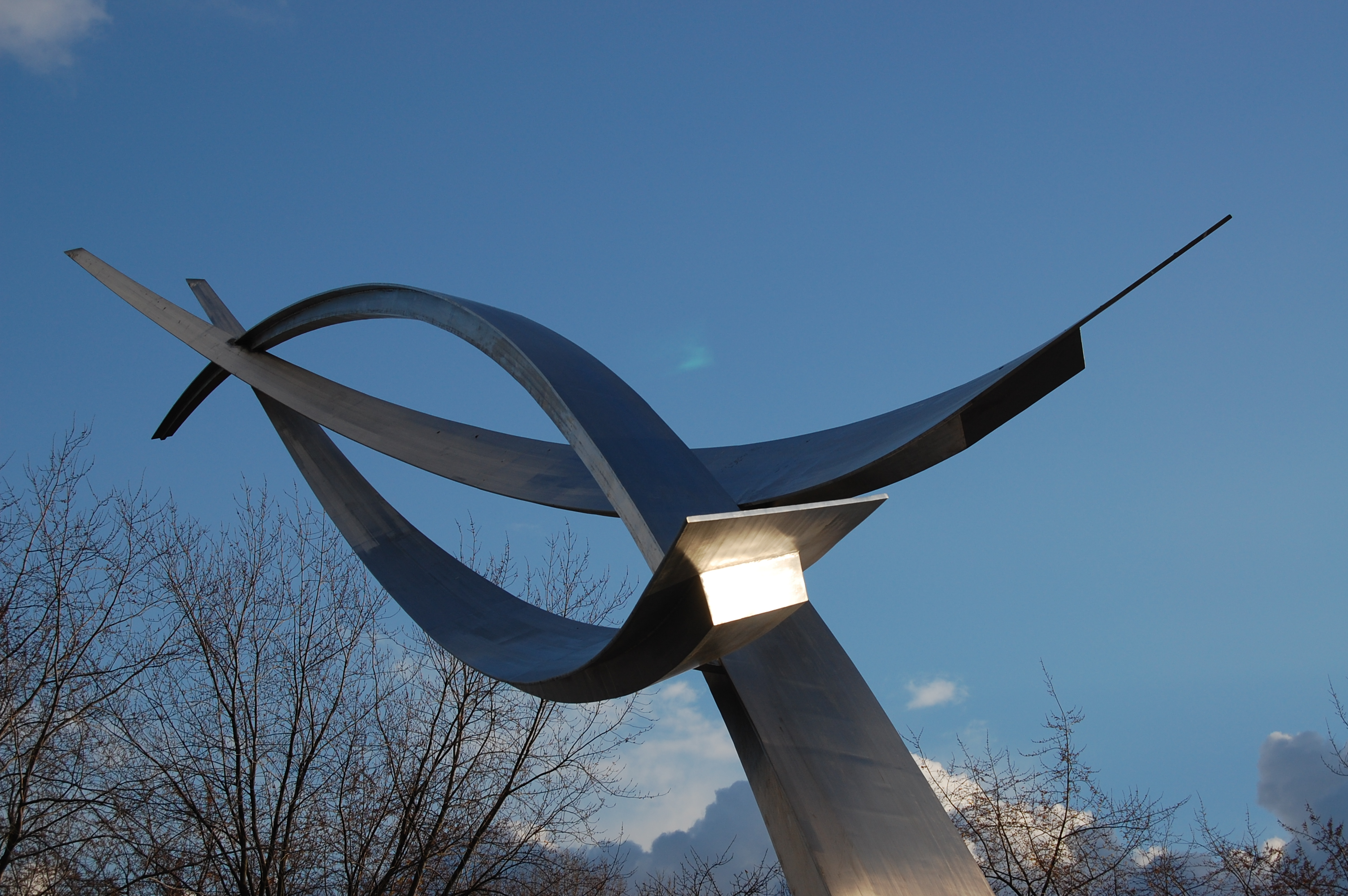
Monument in Memory of the Fallen Polish Pilots in World War II in the Pole Mokotowskie

From 1818 until World War II, on what was originally a 200 ha area, a major part was occupied by an airfield and the Warsaw Polytechnic aircraft works. The Pole Mokotowskie was also, until 1934, the site of Warsaw Airport and, in the years 1884-1939, of the Warsaw Horse Racing Track. On May 17, 1935, the funeral of Józef Piłsudski took place on the Pole Mokotowskie.

The current park was designed by Stanisław Bolek and created in the 1970s and 1980s. In 2010, a two-kilometer educational trail was opened named after Ryszard Kapuściński. In 2018, near the intersection of al. Niepodległości and ul. Wawelska Street, 45 apple trees were planted to commemorate prominent Polish women.

Greater modernization was initiated in 2021-2024. Concreted surfaces were reduced, a new water system with reed vegetation was created, and wooden platforms and bridges and wooden seats were added. New trees and flowerbeds were also planted.

== Fauna ==
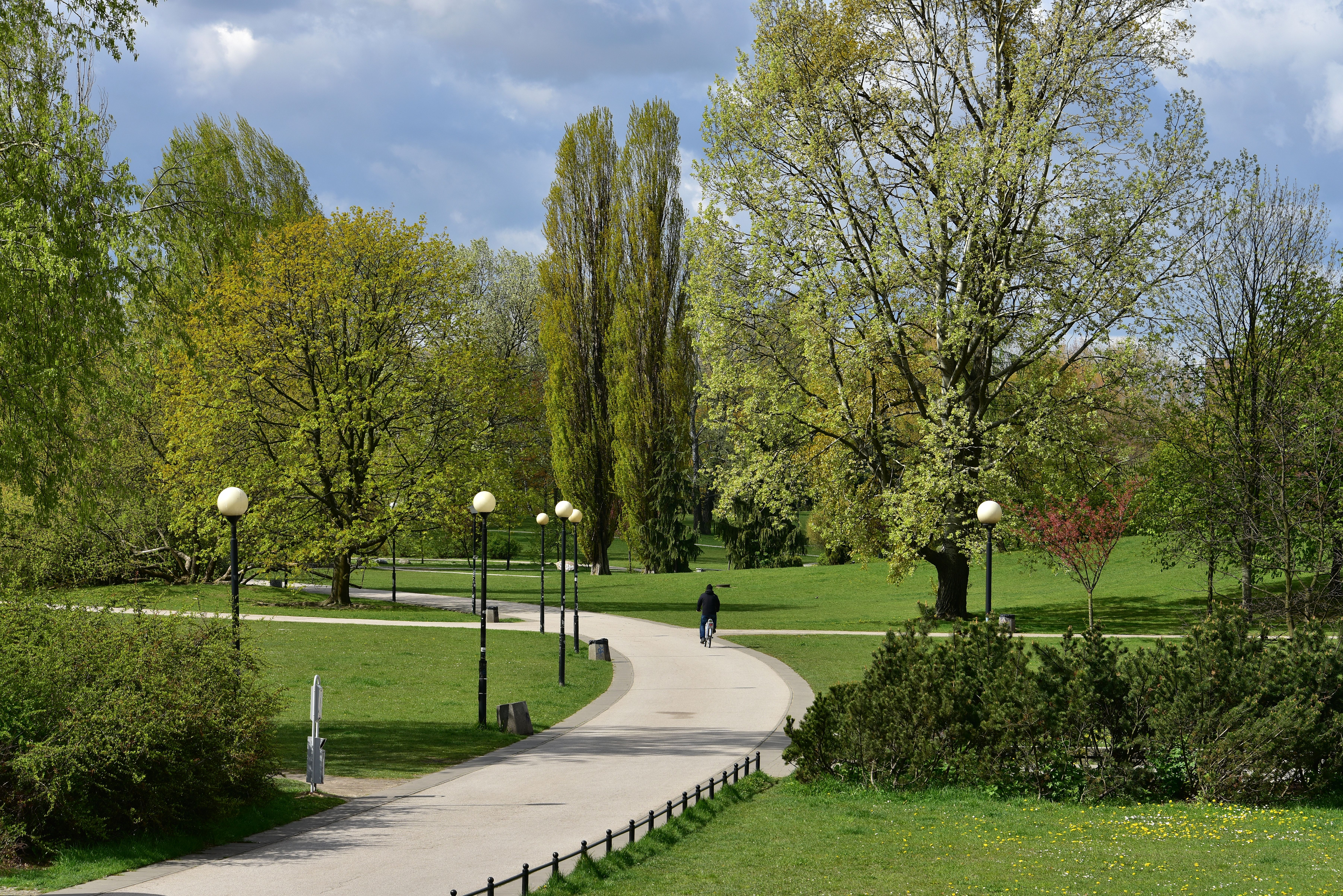
Pole Mokotowskie near the Jazdy Polskiej roundabout

Twenty-one families of beetles are found in the park. Most of them are species from the ladybug family, of which the Asian ladybug is the most numerous, accounting for almost two-thirds of the individuals found. The next species, Aphidecta obliterata, accounted for 9.3%.

Due to the periodic lack of water in the ponds, there are no stable fish populations in the Pole Mokotowskie, although some freshwater fish can be observed, such as individuals of the genus Xiphophorus.

== See also ==
- Mokotów
