= Mokotów =

- Warsaw district
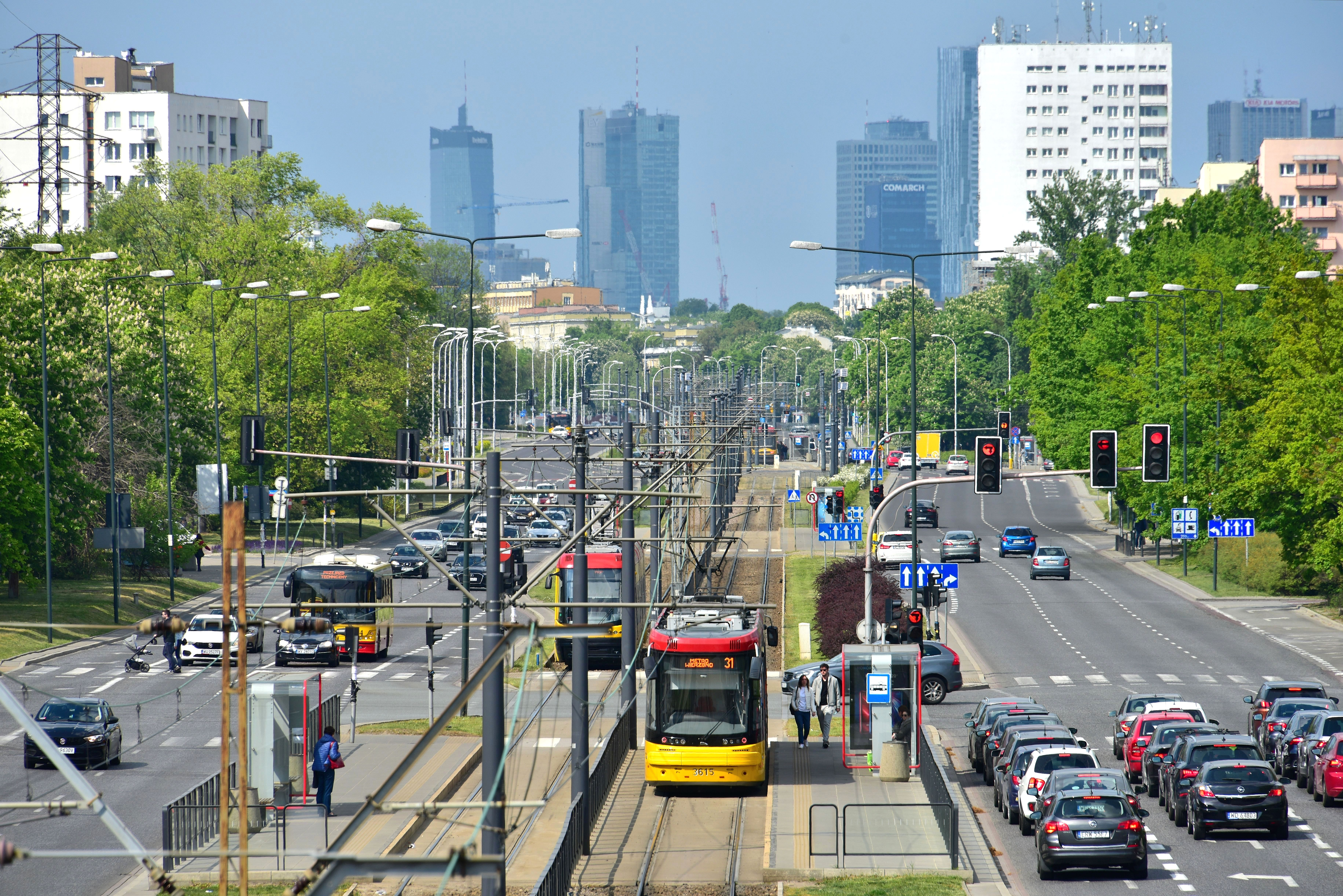
- Wołoska Street

- Coat of arms

- Location of Mokotów within Warsaw

- Neighbourhoods of Mokotów
- Coordinates: 52°12′0″N 21°1′1″E
- Country: Poland
- Voivodeship: Masovian
- City county: Warsaw
- Notable landmarks: National Library of Poland, Polish Radio and Television, Pole Mokotowskie, School of Economics, Warsaw University of Life Science, Mokotów Prison

Government
  - Mayor: Rafał Miastowski

Area
  - Total: 35.42 km^{2} (13.68 sq mi)

Population (2019)
  - Total: 217,683
  - Density: 6,146/km^{2} (15,920/sq mi)
- Time zone: UTC+1 (CET)
  - Summer (DST): UTC+2 (CEST)
- Area code: +48 22
- Website: https://mokotow.um.warszawa.pl/

Mokotów (Polish pronunciation: [mɔˈkɔtuf]) is a district of Warsaw, the capital city of Poland. It is densely populated, and hosts many companies and foreign embassies. Only a small part of the district is lightly industrialised (Służewiec Przemysłowy), while the majority is full of parks and green areas (Mokotów Field).

Although the area has been populated at least since the early Middle Ages, Mokotów was not incorporated into Warsaw until 1916. The origins of the area's name are unclear, first appearing as the village of Mokotowo in documents from the year 1367. It is hypothesised to have come from the name of a German owner of the village, who called himself Mokoto or Mokot, although no exact reference to such an individual has been found in historical records. In the 18th century, Moktów developed as a place where mansions, villas and palaces of the magnates and wealthy bourgeoisie were built. However, most of the area was urbanised and redeveloped throughout the 1930s in the style of modernism. The majority of buildings survived World War II, making it one of the few well-preserved pre-war areas of Warsaw. Mokotów Prison is located within the borough. Residential real estate in Mokotów, particularly in the neighbourhoods of Stary Mokotów and Wyględów, ranks among the most expensive in Warsaw.

== Subdivisions ==
=== Administrative units ===
The following lower-level administrative units (osiedle) are established within Mokotow (they do not cover the whole district).

- Sadyba
- Służewiec Południowy (Southern Sluzewiec)
- Wierzbno

=== Subdivisions ===
==== City Information System ====
Administratively defined in 1996, this district is divided into following areas:

- Stary Mokotów
- Sielce
- Czerniaków
- Siekierki
- Augustówka
- Sadyba
- Stegny
- Wierzbno
- Ksawerów
- Służew
- Służewiec
- Wyględów

==== Historical ====
While the following subdivisions have no formal, administrative status, they are recognised in everyday life.

- Górny Mokotów (Upper Mokotow)
  - Stary Mokotów
  - Wierzbno
  - Ksawerów
  - Wyględów
  - Królikarnia
  - Służew
  - Służewiec
  - Służewiec Przemysłowy
- Dolny Mokotów (Lower Mokotow)
  - Sielce
  - Czerniaków
  - Siekierki
  - Augustówka
  - Stegny
  - Sadyba

== Architecture ==
- Church of St. Anthony of Padua - designed by Tylman van Gameren, built 1690–1693 in Baroque style
- Królikarnia Palace - designed by Domenico Merlini, built 1782–1786 in Neoclassical style
- Szuster Palace - initially designed by Efraim Szreger and built 1772-1774 in Neoclassical style, rebuilt 1845 and 1853 by Enrico Marconi and Adam Idźkowski in Gothic Revival style
- SGH Warsaw School of Economics - designed by Jan Koszczyc Witkiewicz and built 1926–1955 in Expressionist style
- Wedel tenement house - designed by Juliusz Żórawski and built in 1936 in modernist style
- National Geological Institute - designed by Marian Lalewicz and built 1925–1930, extended by Marek Leykam in 1949–1955
- Iluzjon Cinema - designed by Mieczysław Piprek and built 1949–1950 in modernist style
- Mausoleum of the Soviet Soldiers Cemetery - designed by Bohdan Lachert and Władysław Niemirski and built 1949–1950
- Polish Television headquarters - designed by Czesław Bielecki and Atelier d'Architecture – Karczewski & Bernier and built 2001–2008 in Postmodern style

== Gallery ==
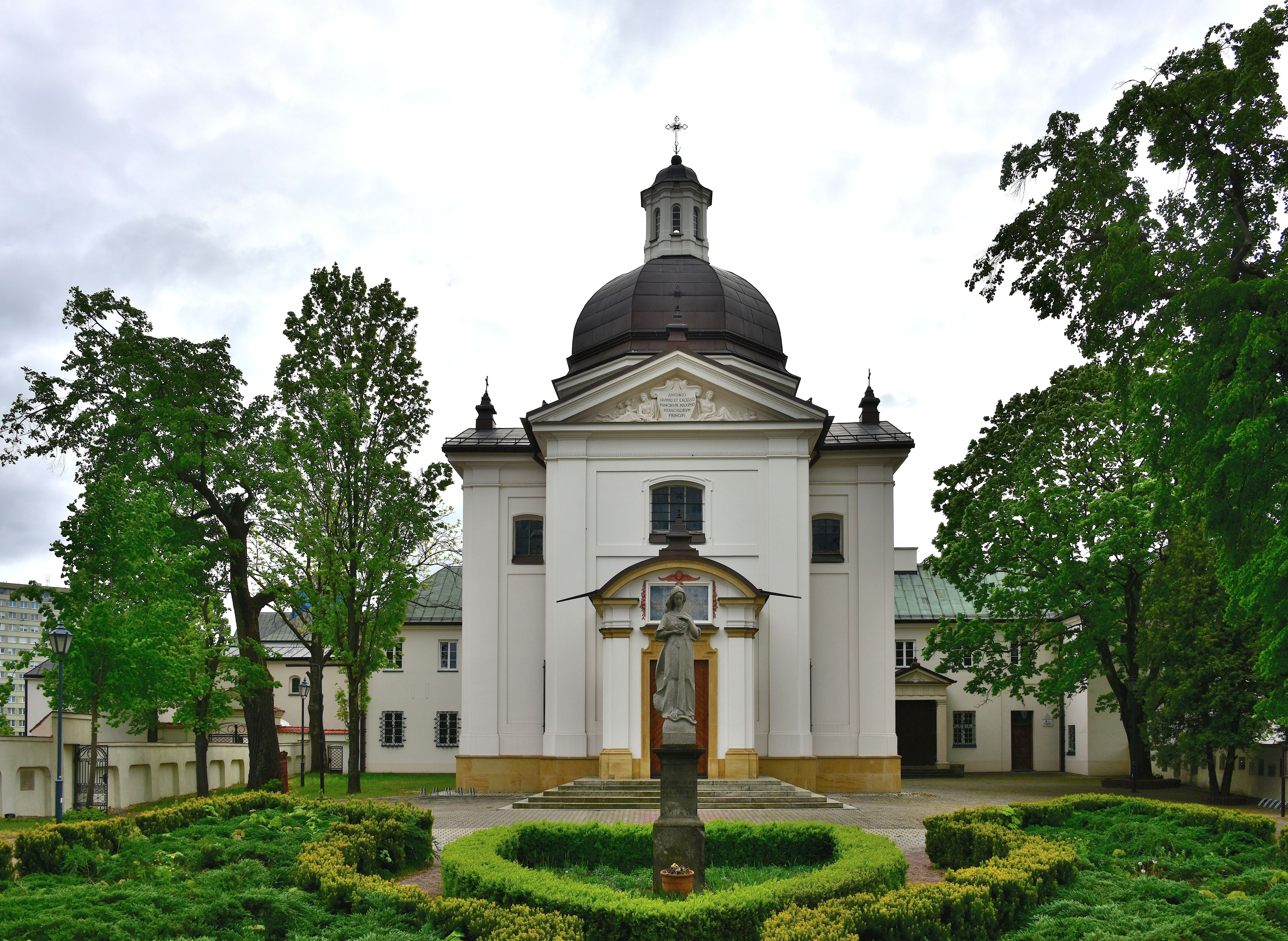
Church of St. Anthony of Padua

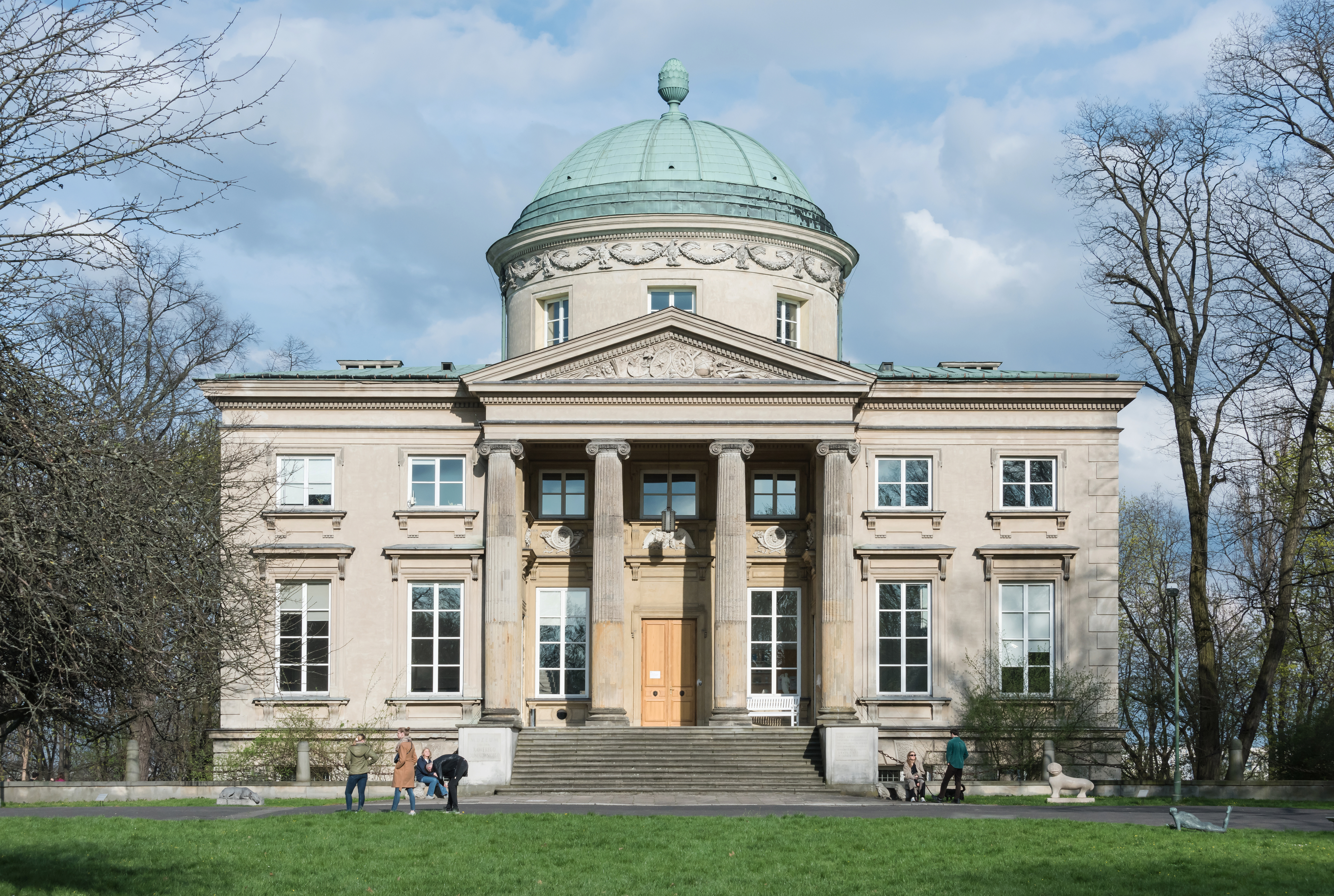
Królikarnia Palace

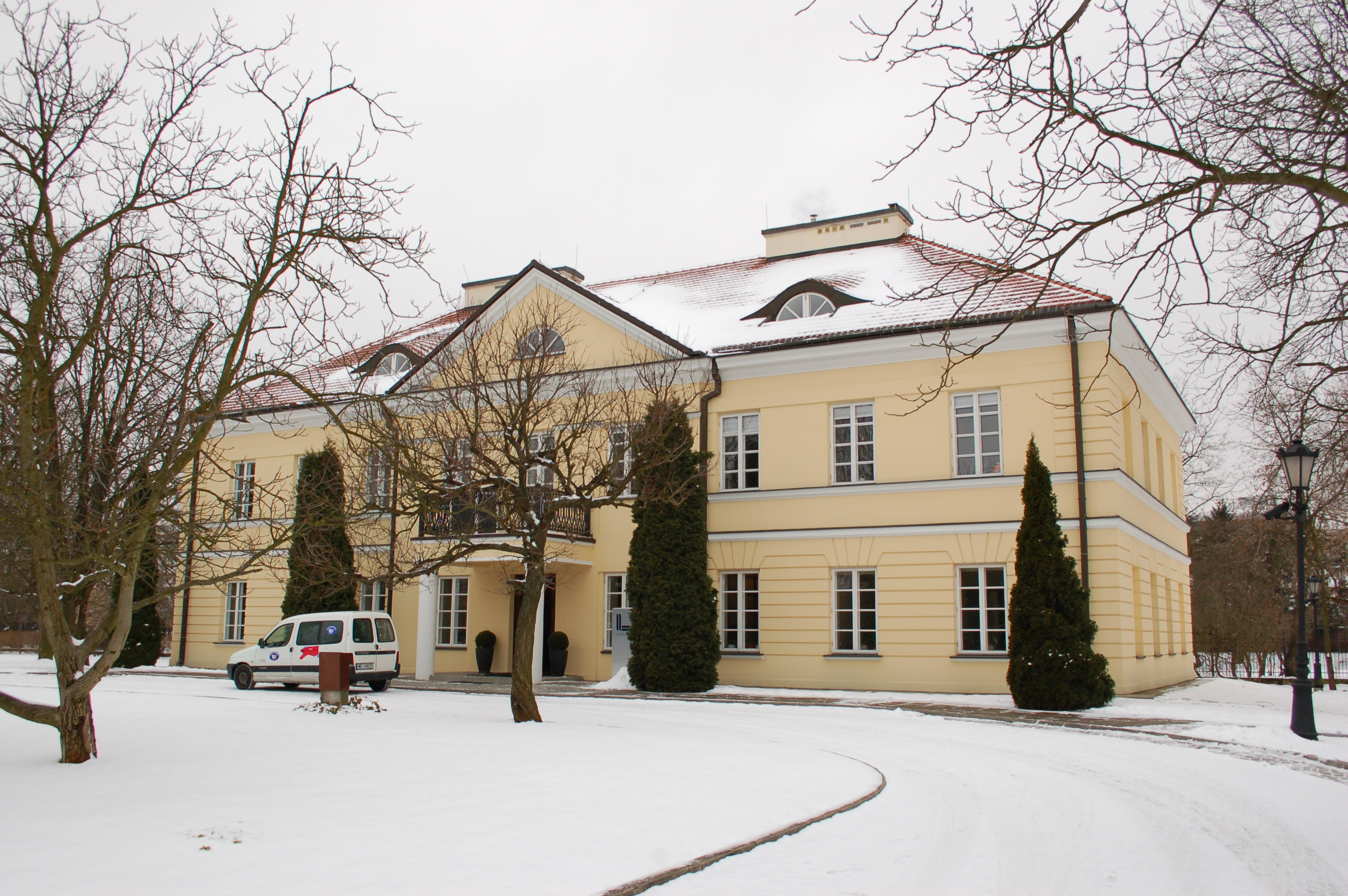
Sielce Mansion on Cybulskiego Street

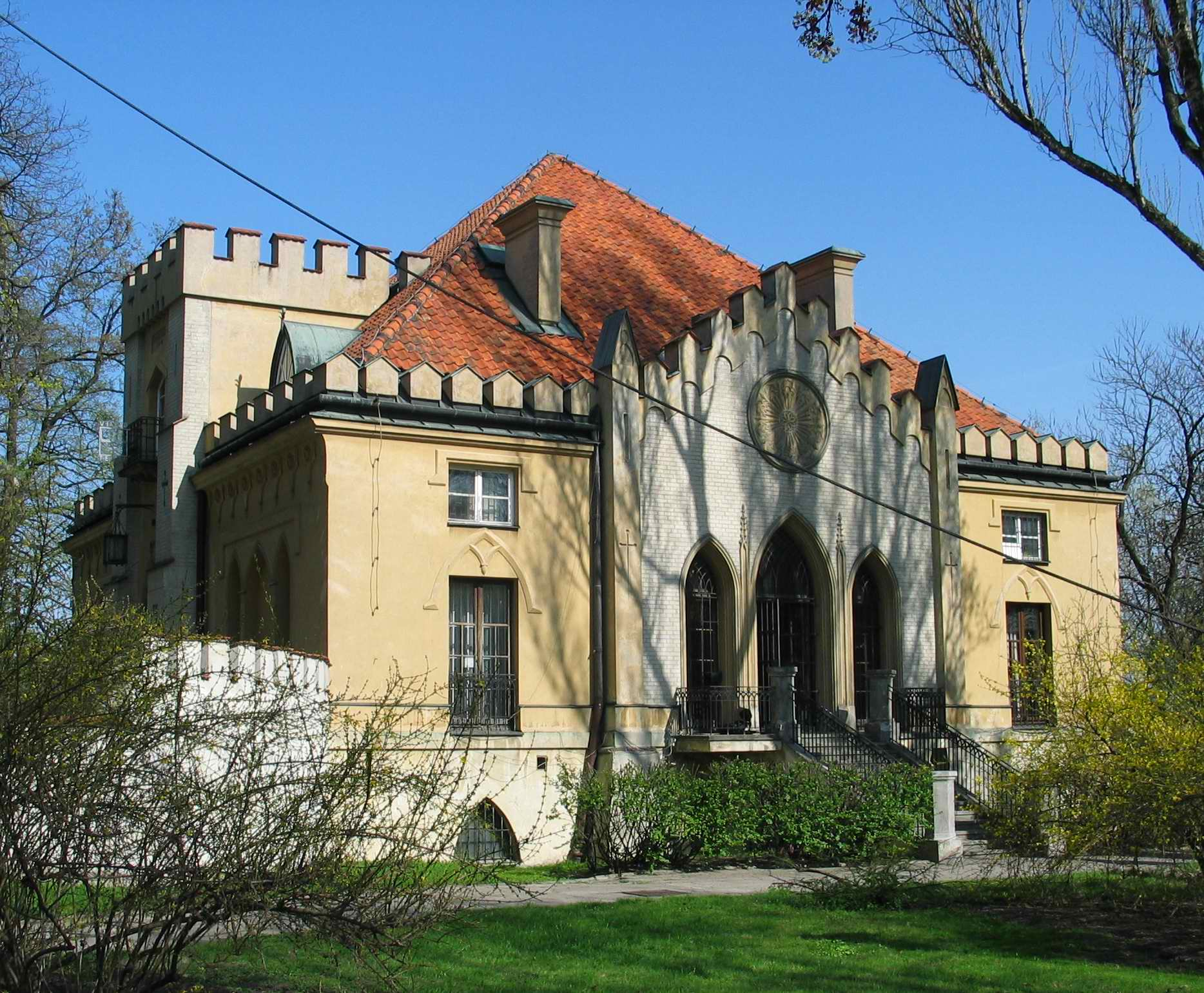
Sztuster Palace

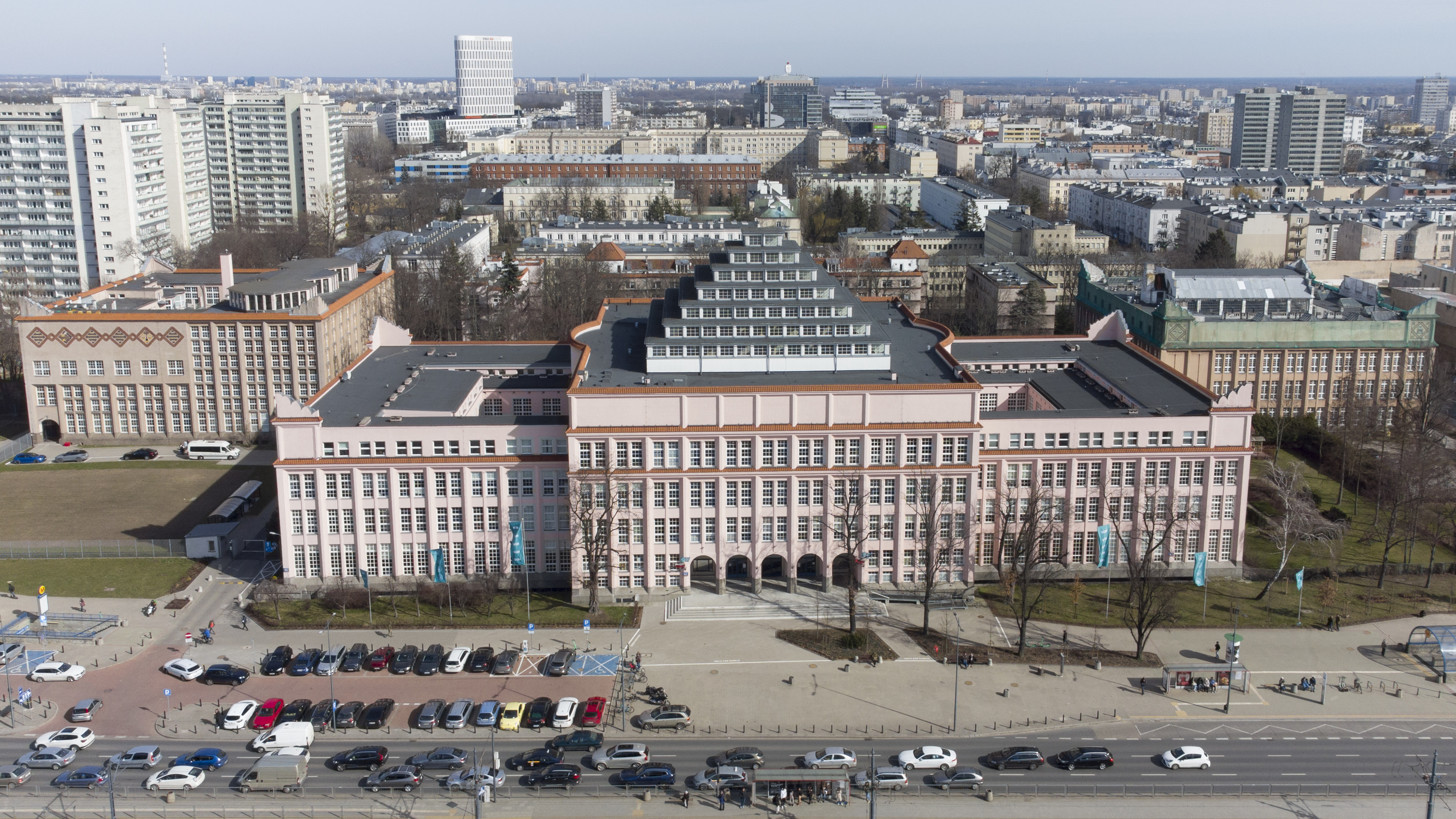
SGH Warsaw School of Economics

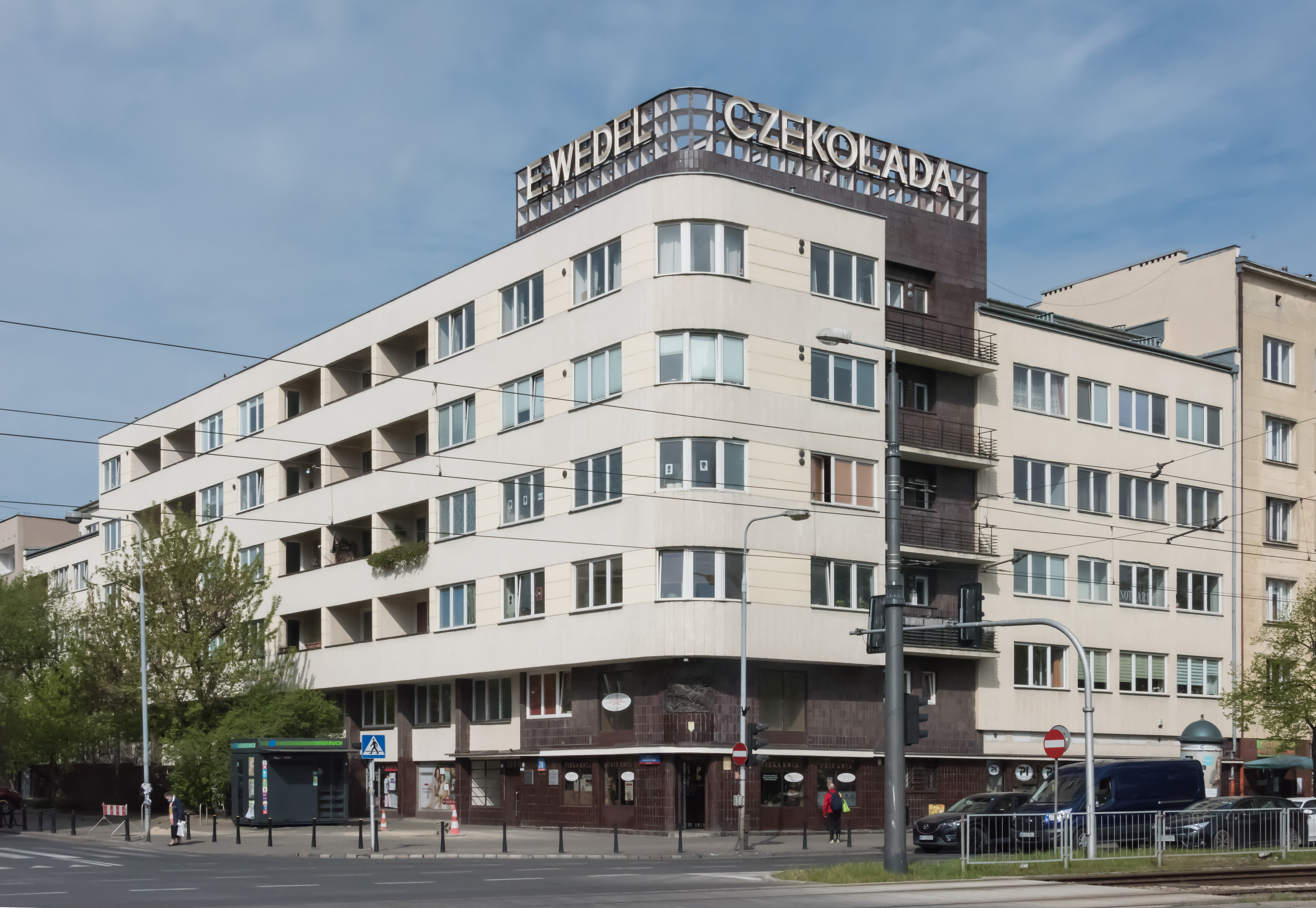
Wedel tenement house

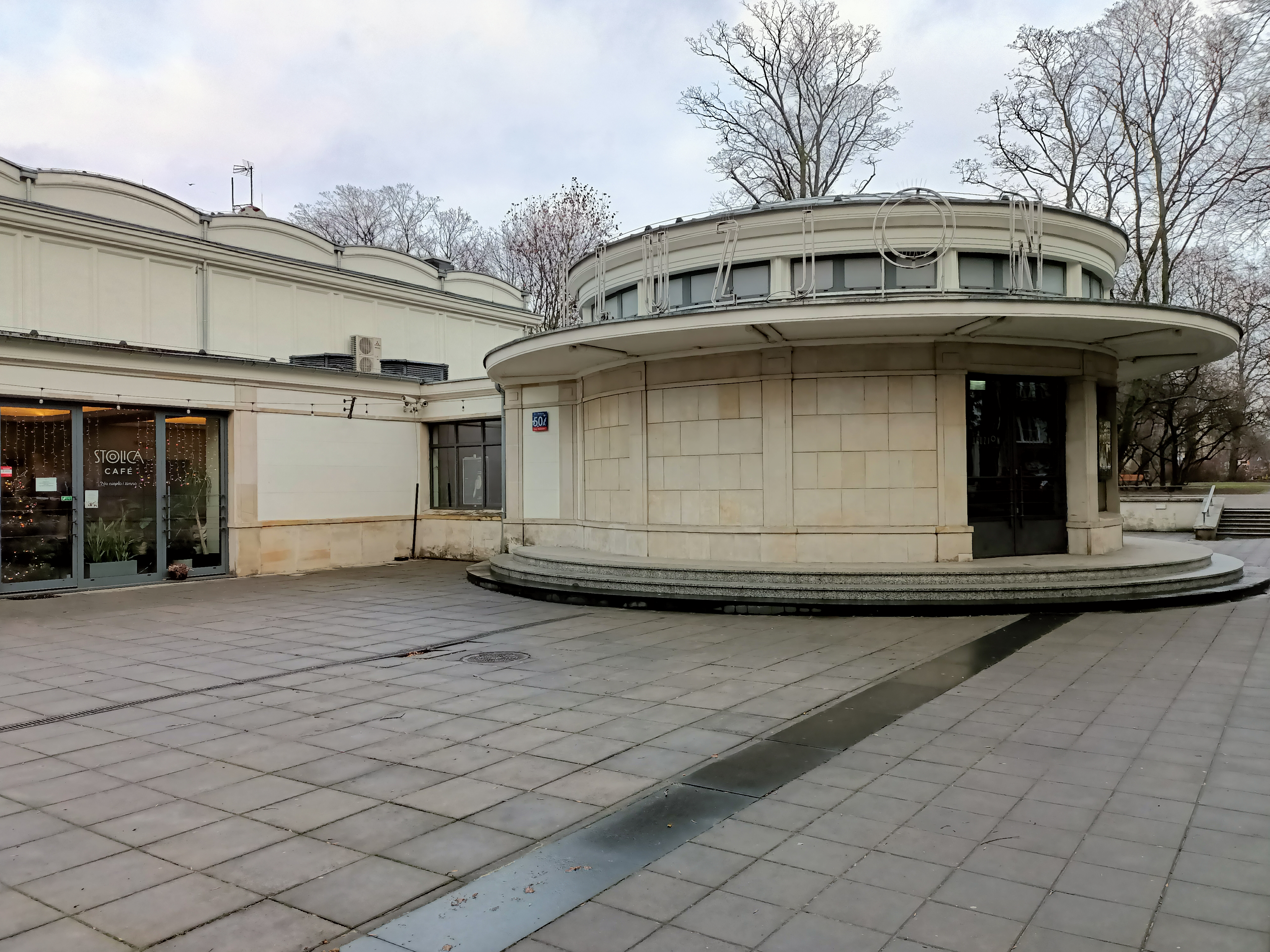
Iluzjon Cinema

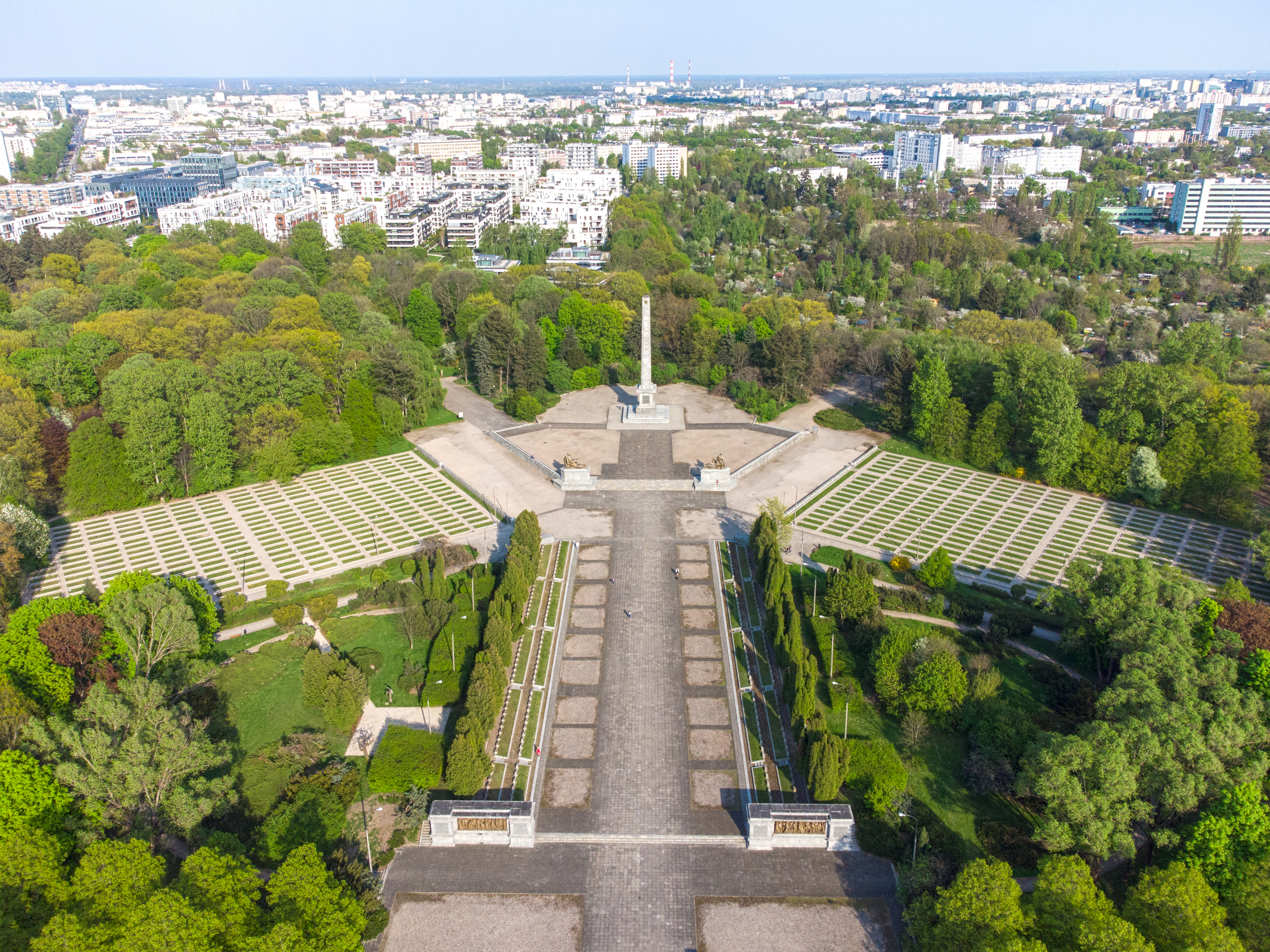
Mausoleum of the Soviet Soldiers Cemetery

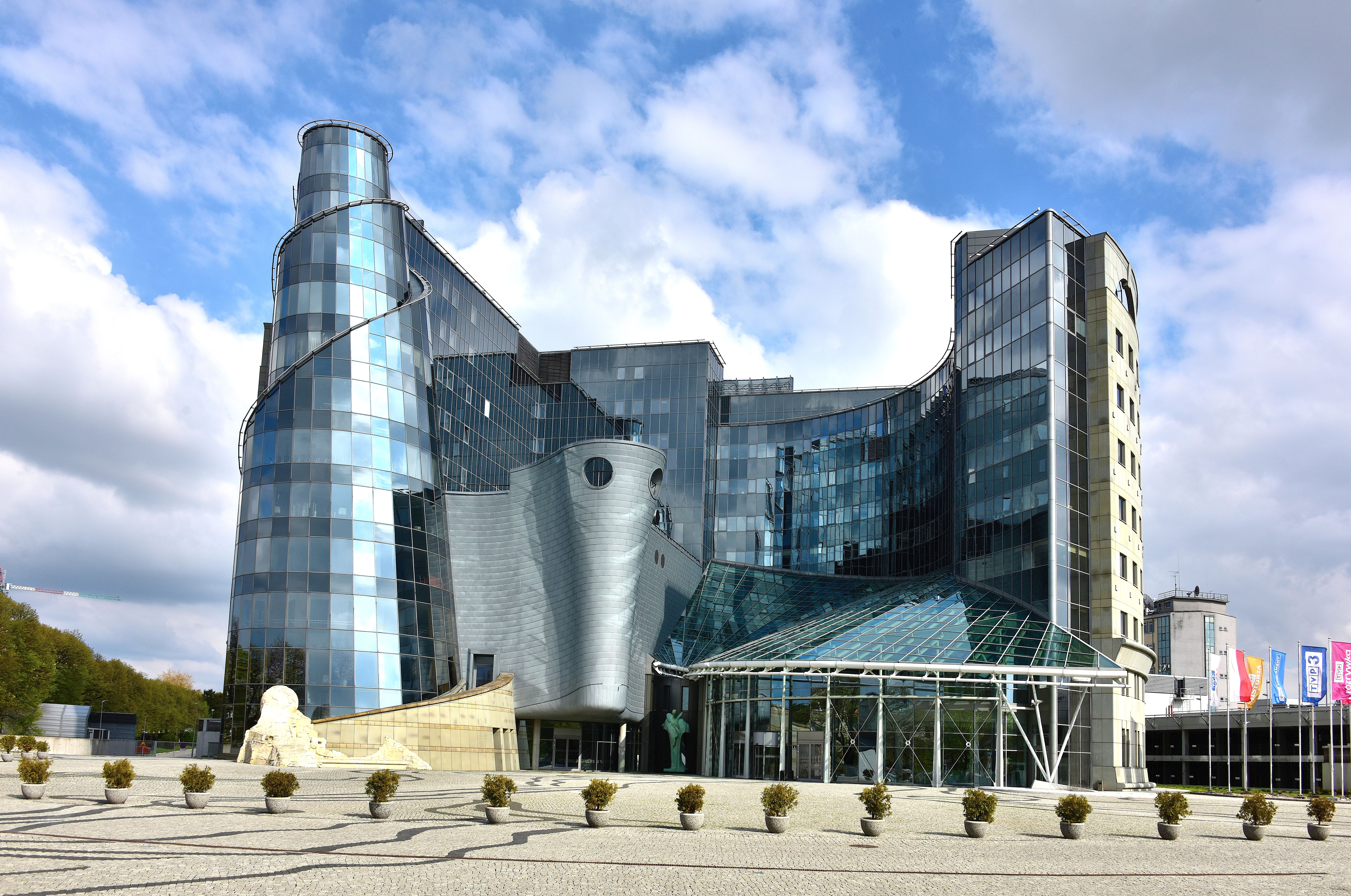
Polish Television headquarters

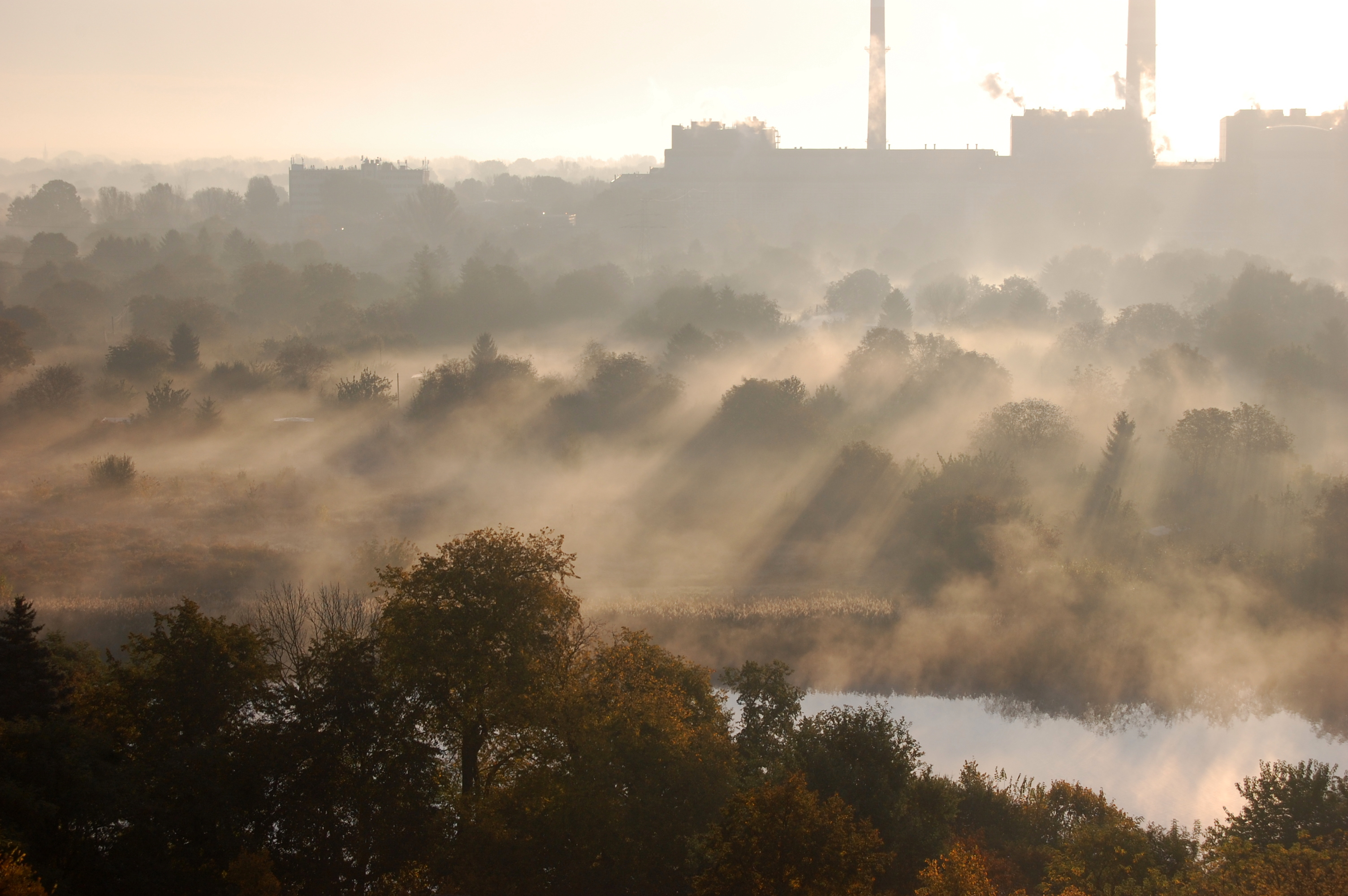
Allotment plots on Augustówka and part of Czerniakowskie Lake
