= Expulsion of the population of Warsaw =

Mass displacement event in 1944

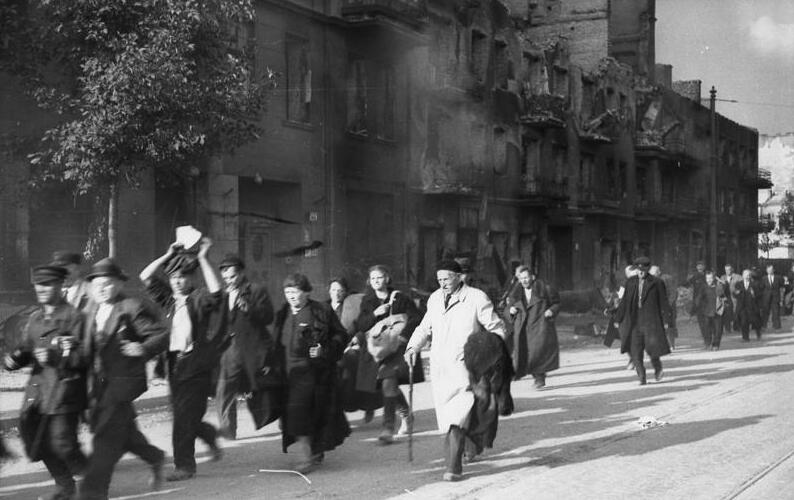
Civilians expelled from Warsaw during the Wola massacre

Between August and October 1944, during and immediately after the Warsaw Uprising, German military and police units expelled almost 550,000 Warsaw residents and approximately 100,000 residents of the surrounding towns from their homes. The large majority of those expelled were sent to transit camps on the outskirts of Warsaw, mainly to Dulag 121 in Pruszków. From there, nearly 150,000 people were transported to forced labor camps deep within the Third Reich or to German concentration camps. The remaining displaced persons – mostly elderly people, women, and children – were resettled to the western districts of the General Government and left there without any means of subsistence.

== Hitler's extermination order and its revocation ==
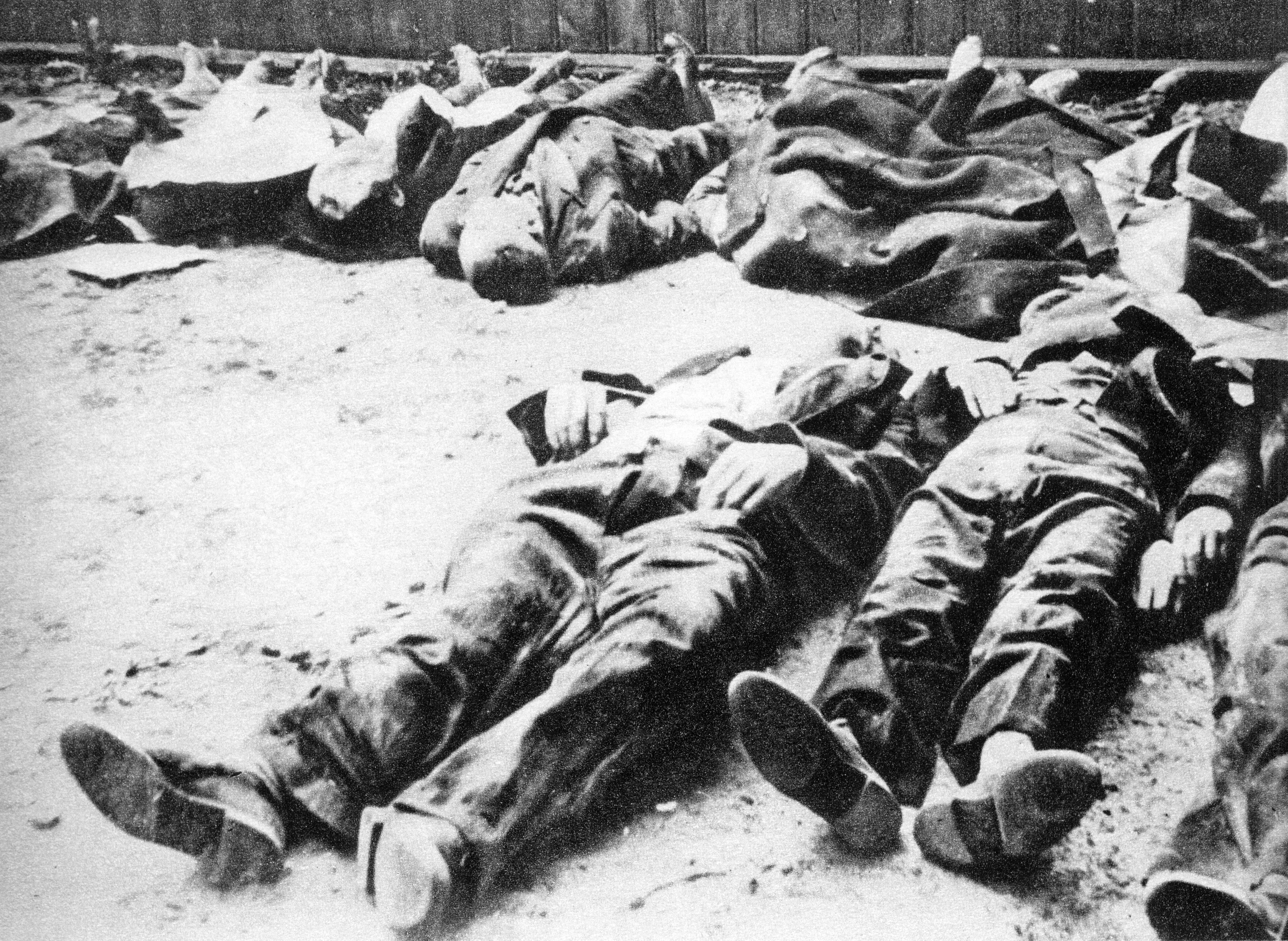
Victims of the Wola massacre

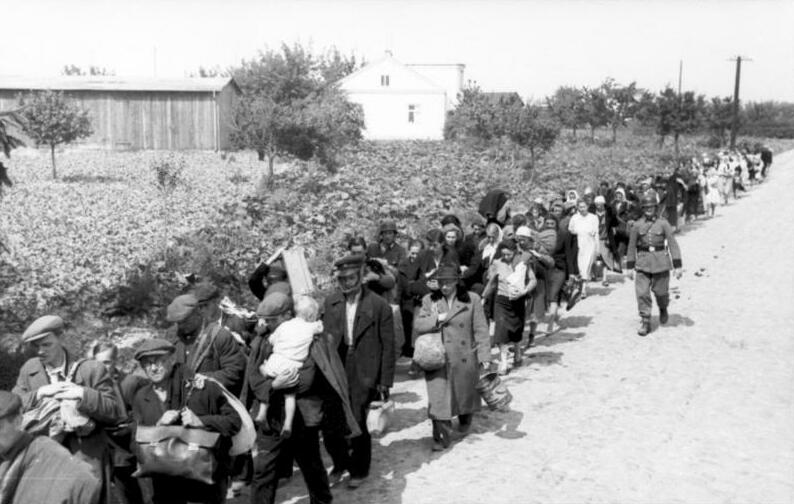
Displaced people marched on foot to the camp in Pruszków

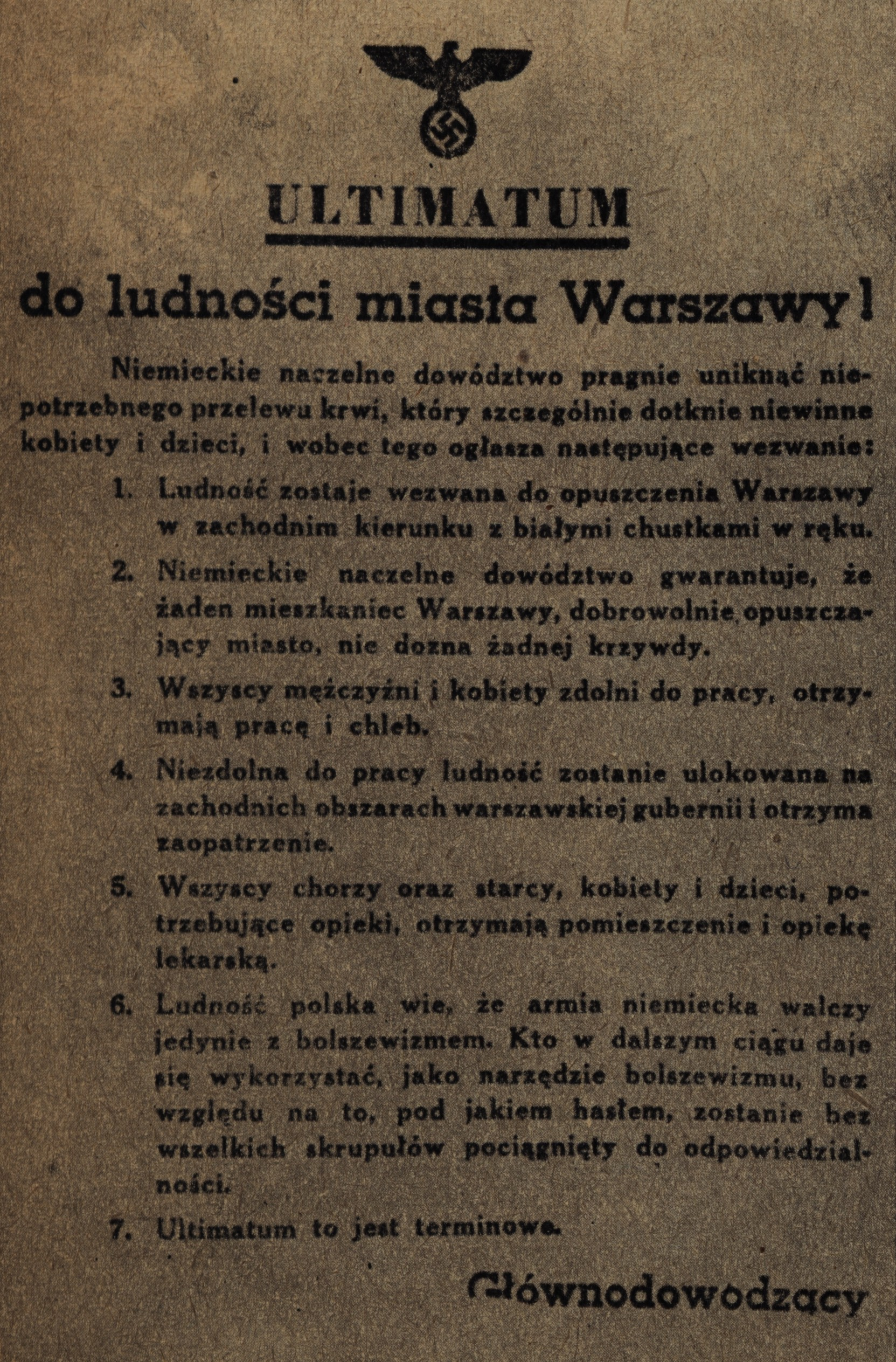
A leaflet signed by SS-Obergruppenführer Erich von dem Bach, calling on Warsaw's residents to leave the city. September 1944

Warsaw was considered by the German occupiers as the center of Polish resistance against the Nazi "new order." Although the capital of Poland was demoted to the status of a provincial town in the General Government, Warsaw remained the center of Polish political, intellectual, and cultural life. It was also the seat of the Polish Underground State and the location of particularly strong and well-organized resistance structures. In this situation, the outbreak of the Warsaw Uprising on 1 August 1944 was treated by Nazi leaders as an ideal opportunity to solve the "Polish problem." Upon learning of the uprising, Hitler gave Reichsführer-SS Heinrich Himmler and the Chief of the General Staff of the Oberkommando des Heeres, General Heinz Guderian, a verbal order to raze Warsaw to the ground and murder all its inhabitants. According to the account of SS-Obergruppenführer Erich von dem Bach-Zelewski, who was appointed commander of the forces assigned to suppress the uprising, the order was: "every inhabitant is to be killed, no prisoners are to be taken. Warsaw is to be razed to the ground, thus setting a terrifying example for the whole of Europe".

From the first days of August 1944, Hitler's order was consistently carried out. In the Wola district, SS and German police units committed the massacre of the Polish population, killing approximately 65,000 men, women, and children in a matter of days.

On the afternoon of 5 August, SS-Obergruppenführer Erich von dem Bach arrived in Wola and took command of the forces assigned to suppress the uprising. On the same day, Bach – presumably with the knowledge and consent of Nazi leadership – revoked Hitler's extermination order. He prohibited the killing of women and children, but upheld the order to liquidate all Polish men – both insurgents taken prisoner and civilians. This decision was based not so much on humanitarian motives as on pragmatic calculations. Bach quickly realized that mass murders only strengthened the Poles' will to resist, and that German soldiers, busy with murder, rape, and looting, were unable to conduct offensive operations against the insurgents. Moreover, from the very beginning, he intended to suppress the uprising through a combination of political and military means, as he feared that the use of purely forceful solutions would prevent him from achieving his main goal – the quick elimination of the dangerous flashpoint on the rear of the Eastern Front, which Warsaw, engulfed in the uprising, had become. On 12 August, Bach further softened Hitler's order by issuing a ban on the killing of Polish civilian men. In addition to the reasons mentioned above, economic considerations were also taken into account at that time. At this stage of the war, the Third Reich could not afford to waste such a large reservoir of potential labor. SS-Oberführer Paul Otto Geibel, the SS and Police Leader (SS- und Polizeiführer) for the Warsaw District, testified after the war that in the first days of August 1944, Bach quoted Hitler's words to him: "500,000 workers in the Reich equals a battle won".

Under the new guidelines, the civilian population of Warsaw was to be gathered in a transit camp (Durchgangslager 121), which was established on the premises of the disused Railway Rolling Stock Repair Works in Pruszków near Warsaw. After a short stay in the Pruszków camp, those fit for work were to be sent to farms, industrial plants, and camps within the Reich. Himmler's order of 8 September 1944 specified that "only those men who actively fought, or those who should be classified as such, should be sent to concentration camps. All those who surrendered voluntarily with their wives and children should be sent to Germany for normal employment". In practice, however, these rules were often interpreted to the detriment of the displaced people. Among other things, at the end of August 1944, the head of the Reich Security Main Office, SS-Obergruppenführer Ernst Kaltenbrunner, recommended to the command of Army Group Centre that, due to "serious considerations of police security", the bulk of able-bodied men and women from Warsaw be sent to work in concentration camps. Only women with small children could be treated as Polish civilian workers and placed at the disposal of the General Plenipotentiary for Labour Deployment. Under this order, many residents of the Old Town, which was being captured at that time, were sent to concentration camps.

== Expulsion of the capital's inhabitants ==
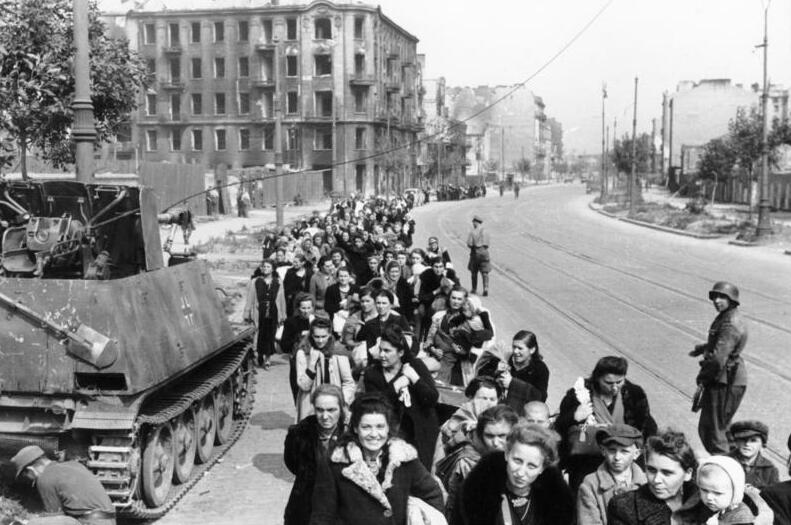
Expelled population of Wola

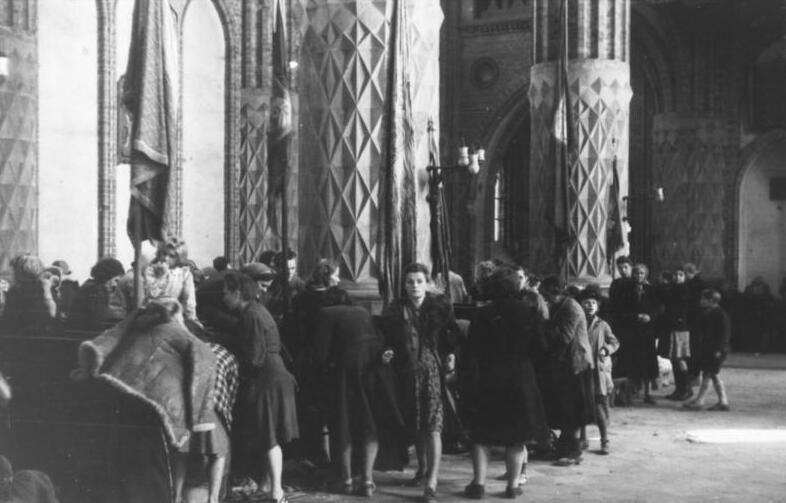
Wola civilians in the Church of St. Adalbert

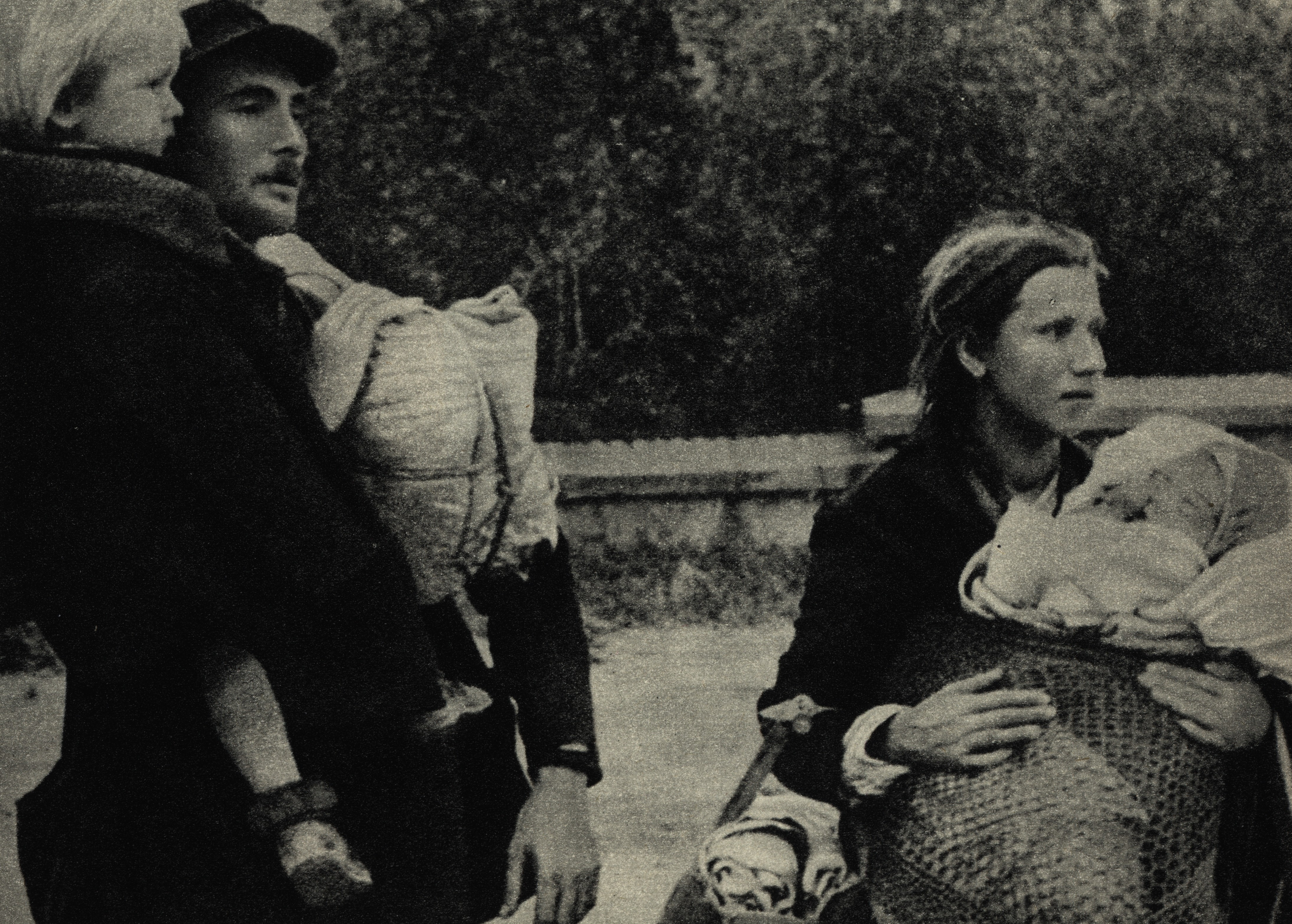
Refugees leaving Warsaw during a temporary ceasefire on 7 September 1944

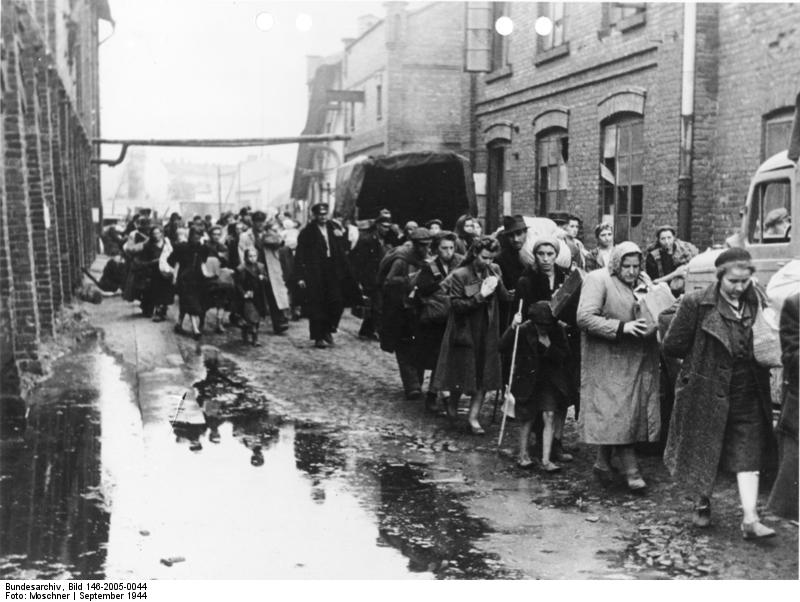
Column of displaced people, first half of September 1944

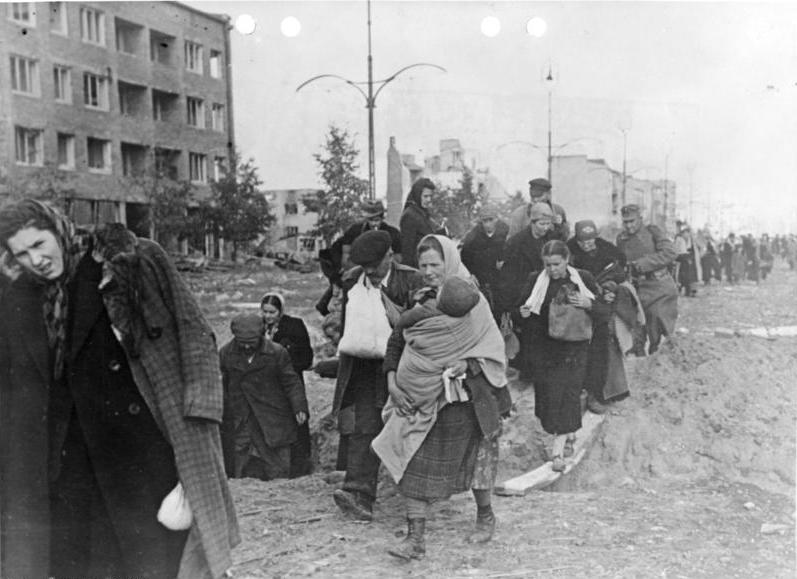
Civilians leaving Mokotów

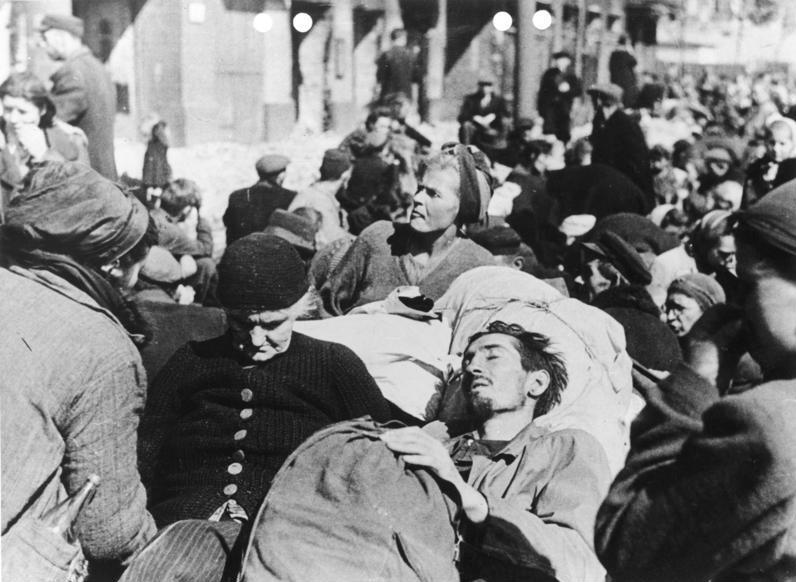
"Evacuation" of civilians after the capitulation of the uprising

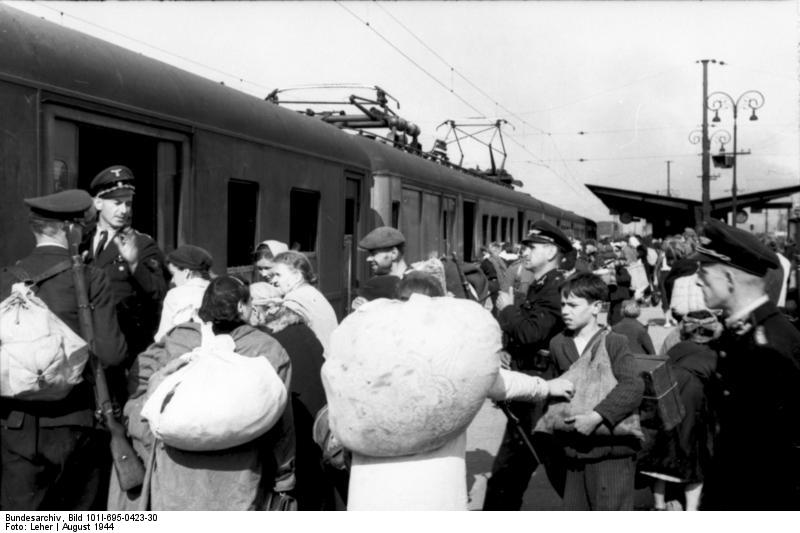
Deportation of Warsaw residents from Warszawa Zachodnia station to the camp in Pruszków

The exodus of Warsaw's population began essentially from the first days of the uprising. Warsaw residents living in German-controlled districts of the city were forced to leave their homes. Contrary to official assurances that the purpose of the displacement was solely to ensure the safety of civilians by removing them from the front line, the Germans were only interested in using the displaced people as slave labor and in looting and destroying the city itself. At the same time, as long as the German cordon surrounding the city was not too tight, thousands of Warsaw residents tried to leave the battle-engulfed city on their own. Among others, many residents of Koło, Żoliborz, and Powązki managed to take refuge in the Kampinos Forest. It also happened that the capital's population, driven to the brink of exhaustion by constant bombing and the harsh living conditions in insurgent Warsaw, voluntarily crossed over to the enemy lines. Between 7 and 10 September 1944, for instance, between 10,000 (Polish sources) and 30,000 (German sources) residents of Śródmieście crossed over to the German side. On 26 September, almost 9,000 civilians left Mokotów in a similar manner.

The expulsion of Warsaw's residents took place in stages and depended on the situation on the insurgent fronts. The course of the displacement can be traced, among other things, on the basis of the chronology of transports to the transit camp in Pruszków:

- 7–8 August: from Wola;
- 9–14 August: from Ochota;
- 22 August: from Sielce and Mokotów;
- 24 August: from the area of Krakowskie Przedmieście;
- 31 August–5 September: from the Old Town;
- 2–3 September: from Sadyba;
- 5–9 September: from Powiśle;
- 12–17 September: from Bielany and Marymont;
- 14–23 September: from Powiśle Czerniakowskie;
- 25–28 September: from Upper Mokotów;
- 28 September–1 October: from Żoliborz;
- 2–10 October: from Śródmieście.

When fighting on the Eastern Front temporarily ceased, the Germans also began the systematic deportation of the population from the right-bank districts of Praga not affected by the uprising, starting with Gocławek and Grochów. The deportations began before 15 August 1944, intensified from 20 August, and lasted until 9 September. Initially, they affected men between the ages of 16 and 60, and in the final phase, also women under 45 without small children. It is difficult to discern any pattern in the transport of people from Praga – in general, they were sent to the Reich for forced labor, although there were also deportations to concentration camps, especially in the case of transports from the so-called Old Praga.

The population of the areas closest to Warsaw was also subject to expulsion – Anin, Babice, Bemowo, Boernerowo, Jelonki, Kobyłka, Łomianki, Młociny, Tłuszcz, Ursus, Wawer, Wawrzyszew, Włochy, and Zielonka – which was related to the implementation of a plan to reduce the Polish population within a 35-kilometer radius of Warsaw. The main aim of this operation was to capture the inhabitants of the capital who, after fleeing the city, sought refuge in the surrounding towns. German plans envisaged dividing the Warsaw District into three zones:

- the first, encompassing Warsaw, was to be completely evacuated;
- the second, encompassing the towns around Warsaw, was to be partially evacuated (the intention was to displace all residents of the Warsaw suburbs who had arrived there after 1 August 1944);
- the third, encompassing the entire territory of the district, was subject to a plan to reduce the immigrant population by gradually sending men and women capable of work to Germany for labor.

During the uprising, the expulsion of Warsaw's residents usually followed the same pattern. In the districts that had been taken over, the Germans and their Eastern collaborators drove civilians out of shelters or residential buildings, usually accompanied by beatings, shouting, and the looting of all valuable personal belongings. Residents were given no more than a few minutes to leave the building, allowing them to take only enough luggage that would not hinder their march to the camp in Pruszków. Those who resisted, slowed the march (due to age or health), or simply offended the escort soldiers in some way were killed on the spot. There were also numerous cases of rape of women. Those residents of the capital who, trusting German promises, voluntarily crossed the front line were treated in the same manner.

Captured civilians were first taken to makeshift transit camps and assembly points still located within Warsaw. There, an initial "selection" of the displaced was carried out and transports to Pruszków or other transit camps were organized. The people gathered at the assembly points were held in extremely harsh conditions and treated with great brutality. There was a lack of food, water, and medical assistance, and the displaced were constantly exposed to harassment and looting by the guards. Numerous murders, deaths from wounds, illness, and exhaustion, as well as rapes, occurred. There were also frequent cases of detained civilians being used as "human shields" or being forced to work on dismantling barricades, building fortifications, or cleaning streets. Detainees were sometimes treated as hostages and murdered in retaliation for the deaths of German soldiers killed in battle against the insurgents. The fate of the people held in the Church of St. Stanislaus (commonly known at the time as the Church of St. Adalbert) in Wola and at the Zieleniak vegetable market in Ochota became particularly symbolic. During the uprising, almost 90,000 people passed through the Church of St. Adalbert, and approximately 60,000 through Zieleniak.

The following locations also became assembly points for the expelled residents of the capital:

- the Stauferkaserne and Flakkaserne barracks in Mokotów;
- the horse racing track in Służewiec;
- the Gestapo headquarters on Szuch Avenue, the National Museum, and the complex of the University of Warsaw (Śródmieście);
- the Central Institute of Physical Education in Bielany;
- the area near Moczydło (between Natolin and Pyry);
- a "sawmill/carpentry workshop" in Okęcie;
- the barracks on 11 Listopada Street in Praga.

Both during the expulsion of the population from their homes and at assembly points, officers of a special Security Police unit – the so-called Einsatzkommando der Sicherheitspolizei bei der Kampfgruppe Reinefarth (also known as Sonderkommando "Spilker") – carried out "selections", which consisted of identifying and murdering people deemed "undesirable" by the Germans. This category mostly included people suspected of participating in the uprising or of Jewish origin, as well as those who were wounded, sick, or infirm (and therefore incapable of work and unable to reach the camp in Pruszków on their own) or members of certain social groups (mainly the intelligentsia and clergy). The "selection" criteria were so fluid that, in practice, anyone who for some reason did not appeal to the SS men could be pulled out of the crowd. The execution of "undesirable people" took place mainly in the vicinity of the Pfeiffer tannery on Okopowa Street in Wola.

The expulsion of Warsaw's inhabitants was finally sealed by the capitulation of the Warsaw Uprising on 2 October 1944. At that time, there were about 200,000 civilians in the capital, mainly in the area of Śródmieście, which was still in Polish hands. Under the "Agreement on the Cessation of Hostilities in Warsaw", all of them had to leave the capital together with the army. Only hospital staff, parsons of Warsaw parishes, members of the Civil Air Defense, fire brigade officers, and building caretakers were to remain in the city temporarily. During the capitulation negotiations, Bach agreed to respect the principle of not separating families and to raise the minimum age for deportation to labor in Germany to 16, while lowering the maximum age to 45 for women and 50 for men. The surrender agreement clearly stated that "no measures of collective responsibility shall be taken against the civilian population that remained in the city during the fighting [...] The evacuation of the civilian population from Warsaw, demanded by the German leadership, will be arranged in such a way as to spare the evacuees various hardships". However, the Germans had no intention of complying with these conditions.

Most of the surviving residents left Warsaw in the first ten days of October 1944. Thanks to the joint efforts of the Polish Red Cross and the medical services of the Home Army, almost 14,000 patients and employees of local hospitals were successfully evacuated from Śródmieście. After the capitulation of the uprising, the Wola Hospital at 26 Płocka Street and, for the longest time, the St. Stanislaus Infectious Diseases Hospital at Wolska Street continued to operate temporarily in Warsaw. On 24 October 1944, the staff and patients of the latter hospital were evacuated to makeshift hospitals in Podkowa Leśna, Olszanka, Puszcza Mariańska, and Pszczelin near Brwinów. On the same day, the Central and District Boards of the Polish Red Cross, which had remained in Warsaw until then, also evacuated to Radom. The next day, an order prohibiting civilians from staying in the city came into force. On 15 November, another transport from Warsaw arrived at the camp in Pruszków, carrying people who did not want to leave the city but had been tracked down and captured by the Germans. In this case, their lives were spared as an exception.

== Transit camp in Pruszków ==
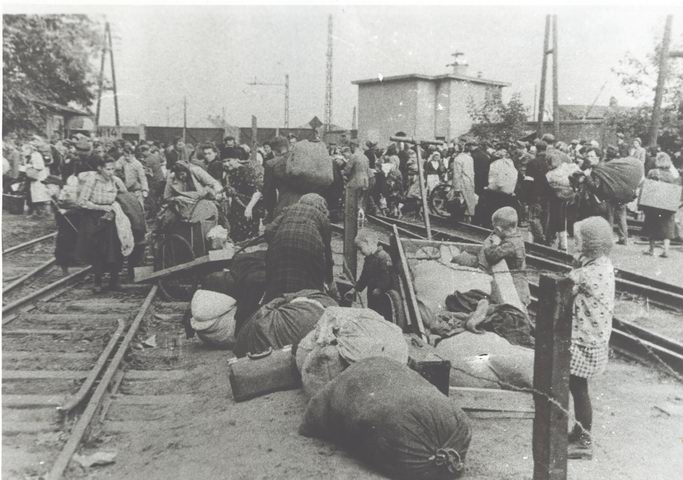
Displaced people upon arrival in Pruszków

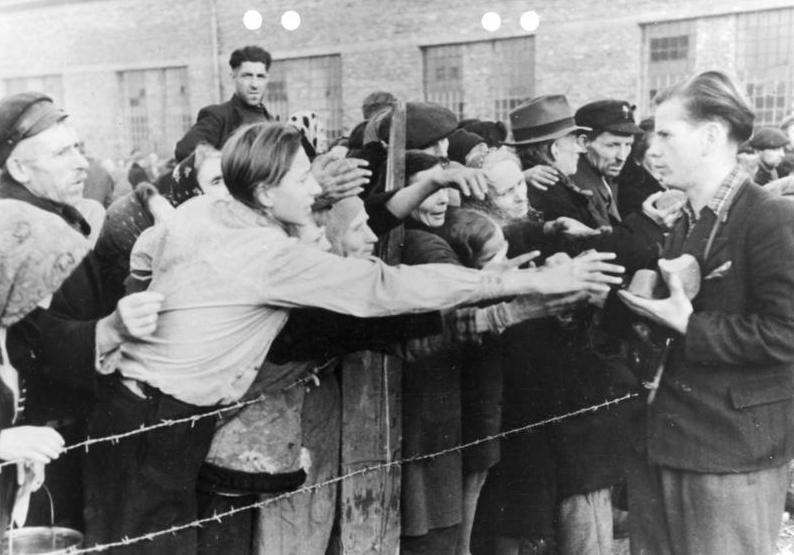
Pruszków – distribution of food by Polish Red Cross workers

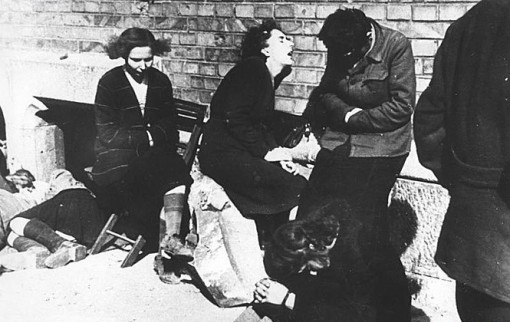
Women from Warsaw's Wola district at the Pruszków camp

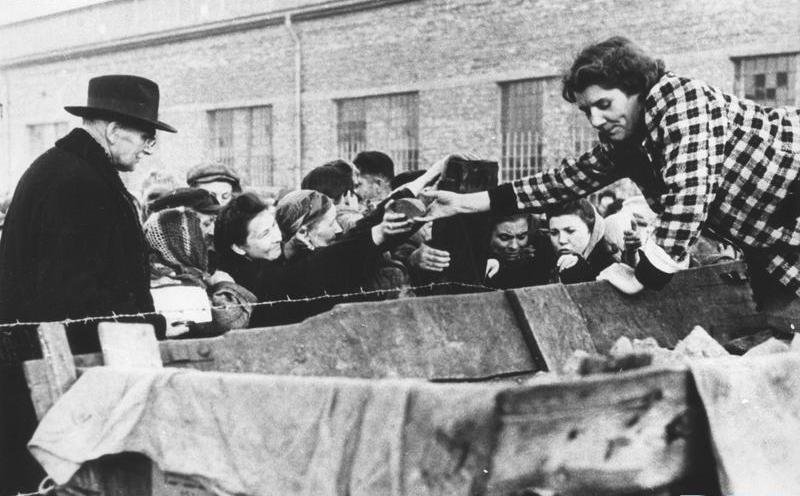
Bishop Antoni Szlagowski among prisoners of Dulag 121 camp

After a short stay at the assembly points, the gathered population was sent to transit camps outside Warsaw. The largest and most well-known of these was Dulag 121 in Pruszków. It was established on 6 August 1944 on the basis of von dem Bach's order, agreed two days earlier with the administrative authorities of the General Government. Dulag 121 was organized on the premises of the disused Railway Rolling Stock Repair Works, located in the Żbików district of Pruszków. Several factors contributed to the choice of this location. In the fall of 1939, the plant housed a transit camp for Polish prisoners of war, which at that time had a capacity of 2,000 people. Later (from 20 January 1941), it temporarily housed a labor camp for Jews. As a result, in 1944, elements of the security infrastructure (bunkers, watchtowers) still existed on the premises of the plant, which could be adapted for the needs of the new camp. Pruszków was also chosen because of its favorable location – a short distance from the capital and conveniently located on the railway from Warsaw to Skierniewice, which enabled efficient "unloading" of the camp. Dulag 121 was organized and supplied by the civilian administration of the General Government, but it was controlled by von dem Bach.

The first transport of displaced Warsaw residents arrived at the camp on 7 August. These were mainly survivors of the massacre in Wola, who were first gathered in the Church of St. Adalbert and then sent on foot to Pruszków. In the following weeks, the displaced were brought to the camp by train, usually from Warszawa Zachodnia station. At the end of August and in September 1944, several dozen passenger trains (3 to 6 carriages) and freight trains arrived at the camp daily. At any one time, there were usually between 5,000 and 40,000 people in Pruszków. The camp became extremely overcrowded after the fall of the Old Town, when there were around 75,000 displaced there. However, the largest number of refugees arrived at the camp after the capitulation of the Warsaw Uprising. At that time, almost 150,000 people passed through Dulag 121.

The conditions in the camp were very harsh. The displaced were housed in nine huge production halls located there. They were stuffy and extremely crowded. Each hall had inspection ditches filled with rotting waste and vermin. There were no beds, so the expelled population had to huddle on muddy concrete floors, among puddles of water, piles of rags, rubbish, debris, and the randomly scattered planks, rails, metal sheets, and parts of carriages undergoing repair. In the engine shed, where the Germans placed people considered particularly "dangerous", the floors were also covered with grease and slag. Some straw was scattered in the halls, but it quickly rotted, becoming a breeding ground for lice and other vermin. Although the nights were getting colder every day, the halls were unheated. Due to the lack of basic sanitary facilities, it was impossible to wash one's hands, let alone maintain cleanliness. The few taps provided industrial water that was unfit for drinking. Due to the small number of latrines, the population had to relieve themselves in inspection ditches. Up to 480 workers were employed in the camp kitchen, but even when there was no shortage of food, the kitchen staff could not keep up with its distribution because there were not enough plates and spoons. There was also an insufficient supply of medicines and sanitary products. As a result, there was hunger in the camp, and the displaced persons suffered from dysentery en masse.

The mortality rate was high, as the population – especially the elderly, children, and the sick – exhausted by hunger and the harsh conditions prevailing in insurgent Warsaw, was often unable to cope with the conditions in the camp. At Dulag 121, there were cases – especially in the early days of its operation – of young men suspected of participating in the uprising being murdered. Summary executions were also carried out in cases of attempted escape from the camp or transport. Between 3 September and 27 October 1944 alone, the camp chaplain, Father Marian Sikora, issued 43 death certificates (including 2 for those shot while attempting to escape). After the war, 82 unidentified Warsaw insurgents and 50 civilians (including 23 women and 8 children) were exhumed from graves on the camp grounds. In Tworki and Milanówek, where the largest hospitals serving the camp in Pruszków were located, (Note: Sick expelled people, officially released from the camp in Pruszków, were placed in the hospital in Tworki, which previously could accommodate 800 patients at a time but had to accommodate as many as 4,000 in the post-uprising period. A second hospital was organized in Milanówek. No further information about its operation is available (Exodus Warszawy (1992, p. 52, vol. I)).) 807 deceased refugees were buried. The Polish Red Cross compiled a list of the names of deceased refugees buried in cemeteries near Warsaw, which contained 1,559 names. However, it did not include all the burial sites of Warsaw residents expelled in 1944, so the number of camp prisoners who died of disease or exhaustion may be as high as several thousand.

Unlike other German camps, Dulag 121 allowed Polish medical and kitchen staff from outside the camp to work there. (Note: The kitchen of the Pruszków camp had between 200 and 400 workers. At its peak, the camp's sanitary services employed about 500 people, including 102 doctors and 122 nurses. (Exodus Warszawy (1992, p. 52, vol. I)).) The German authorities also permitted three Catholic priests to perform pastoral duties as camp chaplains. The camp in Pruszków was also visited by the Warsaw suffragan bishop, Antoni Szlagowski (20 August 1944), and representatives of the International Red Cross (18 September 1944). With the consent of the Germans, the Central Welfare Council and the Polish Red Cross took care of the displaced population, which alleviated the difficult situation of the prisoners to some extent. Polish personnel – most of whom had been sent to the camp by the Polish Underground State – tried to protect the population from being sent to concentration camps or forced labor. To this end, efforts were made to classify as many displaced people as possible as "wounded" or "sick" (the "diagnosis" of tuberculosis and other infectious diseases was particularly effective), and therefore unfit for work. In this way, many people distinguished in science, culture, or social life, and even some members of the resistance movement, were saved from deportation.

It is difficult to estimate how many residents of Warsaw and its surroundings passed through the camp in Pruszków. Even during the uprising, the Central Welfare Council estimated that about 650,000 displaced people had been sent to Dulag 121. This was an approximate number, not based on lists of names of those who had been expelled. In the following years, Polish and German historiography could not agree on the actual number of prisoners in the Pruszków camp. According to German sources, it was 350,000 people, while according to Polish sources – 550,000. In Poland, the latter figure in particular became ingrained in the public consciousness for a long time. A breakthrough came only with the publication in 2006 of the memoirs of Anna Danuta Sławińska (née Leśniewska), a Polish camp interpreter from Pruszków. Based on her own observations and German statistics, she calculated that between 390,000 and 410,000 Warsaw residents passed through the Pruszków camp.

Dulag 121 was unable to accommodate all the displaced people. In order to at least partially relieve the main camp, the Germans were forced to temporarily set up several subcamps in neighboring towns. These were organized, among others, in: Ursus (at the National Engineering Works), Piastów (at the Tudor i Piastów rubber factory), Ożarów Mazowiecki (at the cable factory and glassworks), Włochy (at the Era factory), Skierniewice (Dulag 142), and Grodzisk Mazowiecki. These camps were supervised by the command of Dulag 121 in Pruszków. The camps in Ursus and Piastów operated in the first weeks of October 1944. After the capitulation of the uprising, they accepted nearly 50,000 civilian residents of Warsaw. The camps in Ożarów and Skierniewice, on the other hand, were intended mainly for captured insurgents. A total of 38 transit camps were identified, to which the inhabitants of the capital, expelled from their homes during the Warsaw Uprising, were sent. Some of them were organized relatively close to Warsaw, including in Groty near Babice, Jelonki, Laski, Łomianki, Niepokalanów, Pomiechówek, Rembertów (liberated on 12 September 1944), Zakroczym, and Żabieniec. The expelled people were also placed in camps organized at a considerable distance from the capital, for example in Brzeg, Działdowo, Głogów, Legnica, Łambinowice, Namysłów, Oleśnica, Opole, Piła, Prądnik, Stargard, Szczakowa, and Sołtysowice.

== Subsequent fate of the expelled ==
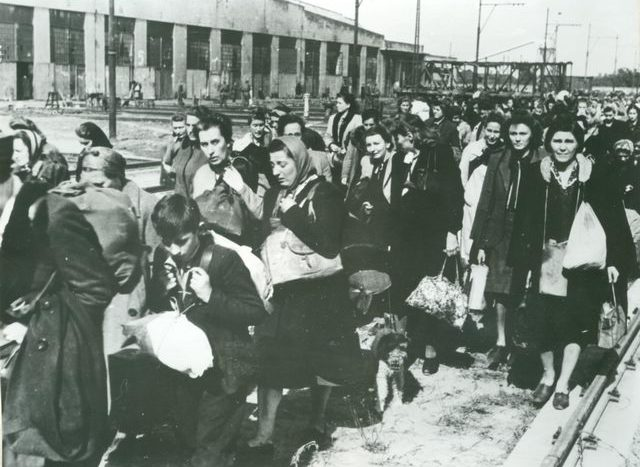
Pruszków – women and children being resettled to the territory of the General Government

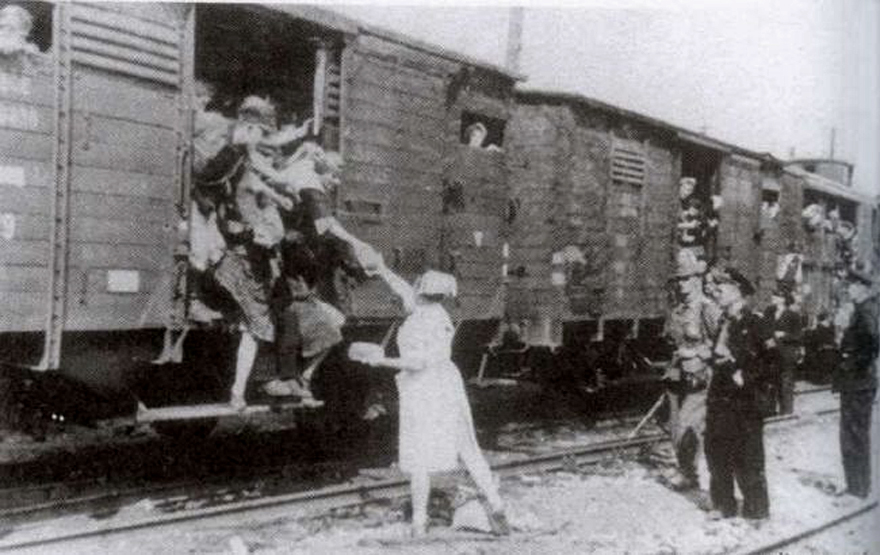
Pruszków – a transport departing the camp

As a result of the Warsaw Uprising, between 500,000 and 550,000 residents of the capital (Note: Before the outbreak of the uprising, left-bank Warsaw had a population of 720,000, while Praga was inhabited by approximately 200,000 people. The number of civilian casualties of the Warsaw Uprising is estimated at around 150,000–200,000 (Getter (2004, pp. 63, 67)).) and approximately 100,000 people from towns near Warsaw were forced to leave their homes. Of this group, at least 520,000 people fell into German hands and passed through transit camps around Warsaw. The number of people who were released or removed from the transit camps under various pretexts, or who managed to escape from transports or leave the city on their own, is estimated at around 100,000. The authors of the monograph Exodus Warszawy. Ludzie i miasto po Powstaniu 1944 estimated that at least 50,000 residents managed to leave Warsaw on their own, another 30,000 – considered sick and unfit for work – were released from the camp in Pruszków or left it by other means, and around 1,000 people escaped from transports with the help of the Warsaw Commuter Railway workers.

In Pruszków and other transit camps, the expelled usually stayed for two to seven days, and sometimes only a few hours. Their fate was decided by the selection carried out by the Gestapo, and the length of their stay in the camp was determined by the date of transport. Selections in transit camps were carried out in a very brutal, hasty, and superficial manner. The principle of not separating families was not respected. Men aged 15 to 60 and women aged 15 to 50 were usually transported deep into the Third Reich. The German authorities maintained that all women were sent to normal employment in agriculture or industry, and men, depending on the results of the investigation, were sent to forced labor or concentration camps. In reality, the destination of the transport often depended on chance, and women with children, like men, were sent to German concentration camps. The conditions of transport were inhumane. The deportees from Warsaw were crammed into wagons so tightly that there were cases of suffocation or crushing. In the first days of August 1944, the wagons were also sealed. Usually, during the several-day journey, the deportees received no water or food.

Nearly 60,000 people, including at least 17,882 women and children, were sent by the Germans to concentration camps. According to calculations by Krzysztof Dunin-Wąsowicz, they were sent mainly to the following camps:

- women and children: Ravensbrück – 12,000; Auschwitz – 5,200; Stutthof – 680.
- men: Mauthausen-Gusen – 8,800; Auschwitz – 7,900; Buchenwald – 4,560; Stutthof – 3,500 (including two transports from Praga on 25 and 31 August); Dachau – 3,040; Sachsenhausen – 3,000; Gross-Rosen – 3,000; Flossenbürg – 2,500.

90,000 Poles of both sexes, deemed fit for work, were sent to forced labor camps deep within the Reich. Warsaw residents deported to work in German industry or agriculture were mainly sent to Nuremberg, Wrocław, Gröningen, and the areas around Hamburg, Stuttgart, as well as to Bavaria, Austria, Thuringia, the Brandenburg province, and Pomerania. The deportees faced discrimination and mistreatment there. The Nazi authorities tried to incite hostility towards forced laborers among the German population. The worst fate befell Warsaw residents who were sent to labor camps, where conditions were no better than in concentration camps.

It is difficult to estimate how many residents of Warsaw, sent to forced labor or concentration camps as a result of the uprising, did not survive until liberation. Between 1939 and 1945, approximately 100,000 Warsaw residents died in concentration camps or during forced labor. A large portion of this number were likely people deported as a result of the Warsaw Uprising. Many exiles – exhausted by their experiences during the uprising, their stay in the Pruszków camp, and the inhumane conditions of transport – arrived at their destination in a state of extreme exhaustion and were unable to cope with the conditions in the concentration camps or labor camps.

Unfit for work – pregnant women, mothers with children under the age of 15, men over 60, women over 50, and the wounded, sick, or disabled – were transported by the Germans (by rail, in open wagons) throughout the General Government and left there without any means of subsistence. The number of Warsaw residents displaced to central and southern Poland is estimated at around 300,000–350,000. (Note: According to estimates by Bogdan Kroll, almost 350,000 Warsaw residents were to be resettled to the western counties of the Warsaw District, 200,000 to the Radom District, and 100,000 to the Kraków District. These estimates, much higher than the actual number of Warsaw residents resettled to the General Government, resulted from the high mobility of the expelled, who moved en masse between different regions of occupied Poland (Exodus Warszawy (1992, p. 18, vol. I)).) Most of the displaced were transported to the western counties of the Warsaw District, and then to the Radom and Kraków districts. The Germans usually directed transports with displaced Warsaw residents to those regions of the General Government that were most convenient for them from a logistical point of view. In principle, however, the German authorities tried to settle the displaced mainly in rural areas. The settlement of large numbers of refugees (sometimes 6–7 people in a single peasant room) was often treated as a form of punishment for the "disobedient" countryside. Transports with displaced Warsaw residents also went to large cities. Among others, on 5 October 1944, almost 37,000 displaced people from Warsaw were brought to Kraków and settled in the districts of Grzegórzki, Dąbie, and Czyżyny.

The plan to settle expelled Warsaw residents in the rural areas of the General Government mostly ended in failure, mainly due to the spontaneous migration of the displaced population. The number of refugees staying in cities or rural areas therefore changed over time. Usually, only the weakest members of society – the children and the elderly – remained permanently in the villages. Refugees generally tried to move to towns and villages located close to Warsaw, as they hoped for the imminent liberation of the capital by the Red Army. The displaced residents of Warsaw concentrated mainly in Milanówek, where the civil authorities of the Polish Underground State – the Home Council of Ministers and the Council of National Unity – as well as the Warsaw Metropolitan Curia had their headquarters. In addition, many representatives of the Polish scientific and cultural world moved there. For this reason, Milanówek was sometimes called the "substitute capital of Poland".

The population of Warsaw, which moved or was displaced to the General Government after the end of the uprising, found itself in a very difficult financial situation; after the uprising, nearly 400,000 residents of the capital had to rely on various forms of social assistance. Refugees were also harassed by the German administration. They were often denied food and clothing rations or received them irregularly. They were also selected on the basis of their ability to work, which often resulted in them being sent to labor in the Reich or assigned to fortification work behind the front lines. Many forced laborers from Warsaw were compelled, among other things, to work on the construction of the so-called Barthold Line in Silesia (along the former Polish-German border). Among the Polish population of the General Government, attitudes of sympathy and a willingness to help the expelled Warsaw residents were widespread. In the fifth year of the war and occupation, however, hosting refugees often placed a huge burden on the impoverished population, especially in rural areas. The situation was exacerbated by the fact that peasants who took in displaced persons were not entitled to any concessions (such as exemption from the obligation to deliver quotas). In this situation, conflicts were inevitable. In extreme cases, the Polish underground had to use flogging to force peasants to take in refugees (including in Miechów County). There were also sporadic cases of intervention by the German police. However, local Catholic priests or Central Welfare Council employees usually tried to ease tensions.

A group of between 400 and 1,000 people – the so-called Robinson Crusoes of Warsaw – remained in Warsaw after the capitulation of the uprising. Some of those in hiding survived the mass killings carried out by German troops in the first days of the uprising. Hiding in the ruins, they were often unaware that the fighting had ended. These included a relatively large number of Jews, insurgents who did not trust German guarantees of safety, as well as the sick and elderly who did not have the courage to set out on a journey. Some of the "Robinsons" eventually managed to escape from the city, others were found and murdered by the Germans, and some survived in the ruins until the liberation of Warsaw in January 1945.

=== Aid operation for the displaced ===
The unprecedented displacement of the population of a city of over a million people caused a huge stir in Poland and throughout Europe. The aid campaign for those displaced from Warsaw lasted essentially from the first days of the uprising. It was conducted through two parallel channels – official and underground. The burden of caring for the displaced population fell primarily on the Central Welfare Council and its local branches, the Polish Welfare Committees. The population of the General Government also spontaneously provided aid to refugees from Warsaw.

It was not until 11 August 1944 that the president of the Central Welfare Council, Konstanty Tchórznicki, was informed of the German authorities' decision to deport all residents of Warsaw. At the same time, the Germans expressed their expectation that the Central Welfare Council would provide all necessary care for the deportees. Tchórznicki then demanded material assistance from the German authorities and requested that inspectors from the council's headquarters be allowed to work in the Warsaw area. The Germans responded by breaking off talks and cutting off contact between the Kraków-based council and its local delegations. As a result, it was not until late August 1944 that the council's headquarters was able to participate in the effort to help the displaced residents of Warsaw. Until then, the entire burden of providing assistance had fallen on the shoulders of local welfare committees. It was only on 3 December 1944 that the Germans allowed the Central Welfare Council to appeal to the population of the General Government with the following message: "Compatriots! You know what disaster has been added to our previous misfortunes in the sixth year of the war. You know the condition of our brothers in Warsaw. Only the united forces of Polish society can cope with the enormity of this misery".

The support provided by the Central Welfare Council to the displaced population of Warsaw took many forms. Significant assistance to the prisoners of Dulag 121 was provided by the Pruszków branch of the council, headed by Father Edward Tyszka. At many railway stations where transports with expelled people stopped – including in Piotrków Trybunalski, Koluszki, Częstochowa, Łowicz, Kraków, Skierniewice, Radomsko, and Żyrardów – so-called care points were organized. Water, coffee, food, medicines, soap, and cigarettes were delivered to the wagons (which were often locked and sealed). Meanwhile, in towns where Warsaw refugees were settled, the council's agencies, together with the provisional municipal authorities and Polish Red Cross employees, organized accommodation, free meals, medical assistance, and registration. Displaced people in need of special care were provided with places in hospitals, shelters, orphanages, or other closed care facilities. Those without means of subsistence received financial assistance. Documents were issued to the displaced, their registration was arranged, and those threatened by the Gestapo were allowed to "legalize" their status. With the consent of the General Government's "government", the Central Welfare Council also opened a Tracing Bureau, which by October 1944 had a file of 20,000 names and addresses of several dozen centers in Germany where displaced Warsaw residents were being held. President Tchórznicki tried to intervene in defense of the refugees, demanding, among other things, that they be granted the right to move freely and settle throughout the General Government (especially in Kraków) and that they be given clothing and food ration cards. He also tried to obtain German consent for the Central Welfare Council and private individuals to send food or clothing parcels to people deported deep into the Reich. The total expenditure incurred by the Central Welfare Council and its agencies to help the displaced inhabitants of Warsaw amounted to nearly 45 million occupation złotys (the so-called Młynarki).

The Polish Red Cross (focusing mainly on caring for the wounded and sick) and the cooperative movement provided assistance to the displaced population of Warsaw. The Catholic Church and the affiliated Caritas also worked closely with the aid organizations. The church's assistance consisted mainly in providing premises for shelters and hospitals, organizing collections, and appealing to the population from the pulpit to provide support to the displaced. Religious congregations played a particularly important role in the aid operation, especially the Jasna Góra Monastery and the entire Archdiocese of Częstochowa (led by Bishop Teodor Kubina). The Polish Underground State and underground political organizations also appealed for help for the displaced people. On 24 August 1944, the insurgent Błyskawica radiostation broadcast a message in four languages and a "letter from Pruszków", which contained an appeal to the International Red Cross for immediate assistance for "100,000 elderly people and children" held in Dulag 121. The appeals were repeated in the following days. On 25 August, the insurgent broadcast was retransmitted by Polish Radio in London, followed by the Anglo-Saxon press. The Government Delegation for Poland sent subsidies to the Central Welfare Council for the purpose of helping refugees from Warsaw. These subsidies amounted to several million occupation złotys per month. Among others, the Pruszków branch of the Central Welfare Council received between 100,000 and 150,000 złotys a week through the district Government Delegate to help prisoners of Dulag 121. The commander of the Pruszków VI Home Army district donated food reserves for this purpose and also directed all medical personnel under his command and the auxiliary personnel of the Women's Military Service to help the displaced. On 3 October 1944, the Lublin-based Polish Committee of National Liberation established the Central Committee for Aid to War Victims in Warsaw, with the participation of, among others, Father Protonotary Kruszyński. Soldiers of the First Polish Army also organized collections for refugees.

Help also came from abroad. The Polish government-in-exile, informed by the Polish Underground State about the situation in which the population of Warsaw found itself, initiated a large-scale diplomatic campaign to launch deliveries of food, clothing, and medicine for the displaced residents of the capital. Financial resources and gifts from local Red Cross committees (Note: Including, among others, 500,000 Swiss francs from the Polish Red Cross headquarters in London, 15,000 Swedish kronor from the Swedish Red Cross, and 10,000 Irish pounds from the Irish Red Cross (currencies given according to the exchange rates at the time) (Zaborski (2010, pp. 118–119); Exodus Warszawy (1992, p. 356, vol. III)).) and Polish diaspora organizations flowed to the headquarters of the International Red Cross in Geneva. Fundraising for refugees was also carried out by soldiers of the 2nd Polish Corps in Italy and charitable organizations associated with the Polish government-in-exile. On 22 November 1944, the "Committee for Aid to the Population of Warsaw" was established in Geneva, headed by former Polish President Ignacy Mościcki. American workers collected 300,000 dollars to help the displaced, while the British government donated 450,000 pounds sterling to the International Red Cross. The Polen Hjalpen committee from Malmö donated 5 tonnes of porridge, 2 tonnes of clothing, and 2,000 Swedish kronor to Warsaw refugees, and the "Committee for Aid to Poland" from Gothenburg donated 150 kg of clothing and 3,000 Swedish kronor. The Swiss pharmaceutical company La Roche donated medical supplies worth 47,000 Swiss francs (currencies given according to the exchange rates at the time). In addition, many international organizations declared their support for the people of Warsaw, both in cash and in the form of food, medicine, bandages, and blood products. Among them were the YMCA, the Swedish Association for Aid to War Victims, the American Committee for Aid to War Victims (operating under the patronage of President Roosevelt), and even a Committee for Aid to Warsaw established in Rhodesia. As a result, two wagons of medicines, food, and children's clothing sent by the International Red Cross from Geneva arrived at the Pruszków camp in September 1944. On 15 October 1944, the Kraków headquarters of the Central Welfare Council received 26 wagons of food and medicine for refugees from Warsaw from Geneva. However, a large part of the donations sent to the expelled Warsaw residents was embezzled by the German Red Cross, which the International Red Cross had entrusted with their distribution.

== Bibliography ==
- Datner, Szymon; Leszczyński, Kazimierz (1962). Zbrodnie okupanta w czasie powstania warszawskiego w 1944 roku (w dokumentach) [Crimes of the Occupier During the Warsaw Uprising of 1944 (in Documents)] (in Polish). Warsaw: MON.
- Dunin-Wąsowicz, Krzysztof (1984). Warszawa w latach 1939–1945 [Warsaw in the Years 1939–1945] (in Polish). Warsaw: Polish Scientific Publishers PWN. ISBN 83-01-04207-9.
- Getter, Marek (August–September 2004). "Straty ludzkie i materialne w Powstaniu Warszawskim" [Human and Material Losses in the Warsaw Uprising]. Biuletyn IPN (in Polish). 8–9 (43–44).
- Hanson, Joanna K. M. (2004). Nadludzkiej poddani próbie. Ludność cywilna Warszawy w powstaniu 1944 r [The Civilian Population of Warsaw in the 1944 Uprising] (in Polish). Warsaw: Czytelnik Publishing House. ISBN 83-07-02987-2.
- Kopf, Stanisław (2001). Wyrok na miasto. Warszawskie Termopile 1944–1945 [Sentence on a City: The Warsaw Thermopylae 1944–1945] (in Polish). Warsaw: Askon. ISBN 83-87545-54-6.
- Kroll, Bogdan (1985). Rada Główna Opiekuńcza 1939–1945 [The Central Welfare Council 1939–1945] (in Polish). Warsaw: Książka i Wiedza. ISBN 83-05-11404-X.
- Przygoński, Antoni (1980). Powstanie warszawskie w sierpniu 1944 r. [The Warsaw Uprising in August 1944] (in Polish). Vol. I–II. Warsaw: PWN. ISBN 83-01-00293-X.
- Sawicki, Jerzy (1949). Zburzenie Warszawy. Zeznania generałów niemieckich przed polskim prokuratorem członkiem polskiej delegacji przy Międzynarodowym Trybunale Wojennym w Norymberdze [The Destruction of Warsaw: Testimonies of German Generals Before a Polish Prosecutor, Member of the Polish Delegation to the International Military Tribunal at Nuremberg] (in Polish). Warsaw: Kolumna.
- Sawicki, Tadeusz (2010). Rozkaz zdławić powstanie. Niemcy i ich sojusznicy w walce z powstaniem warszawskim [Order to Crush the Uprising: The Germans and Their Allies in the Fight Against the Warsaw Uprising] (in Polish). Warsaw: Bellona. ISBN 978-83-11-11892-8.
- Ujazdowska, Lidia (2005). Zagłada Ochoty [The Destruction of Ochota] (in Polish). Warsaw: Fronda. ISBN 83-922344-1-3.
- Wawrzyński, Mirosław (January–February 2006). "Solidarność ludzka w czasach pogardy" [Human Solidarity in Times of Contempt]. Biuletyn IPN (in Polish). 1–2 (60–61).
- Zaborski, Zdzisław (2010). Durchgangslager 121. Niemiecka zbrodnia specjalna [Durchgangslager 121: A Special German Crime] (in Polish). Pruszków: County and Municipal Public Library in Pruszków. ISBN 978-83-62144-04-4.
- Zaborski, Zdzisław (2004). Tędy przeszła Warszawa. Epilog Powstania Warszawskiego [Warsaw Passed This Way: An Epilogue to the Warsaw Uprising] (in Polish). Warsaw: ASKON. ISBN 83-87545-86-4.
- Exodus Warszawy. Ludzie i miasto po Powstaniu 1944 [The Exodus of Warsaw: People and the City After the 1944 Uprising] (in Polish). Vol. I–III, V. Warsaw: State Publishing Institute PIW. 1992. ISBN 83-06-01589-4.
- Ludność cywilna w powstaniu warszawskim [The Civilian Population in the Warsaw Uprising] (in Polish). Vol. I. Warsaw: State Publishing Institute PIW. 1974.
