= Dulag 121 camp in Pruszków =

Nazi transit camp

- Durchgangslager
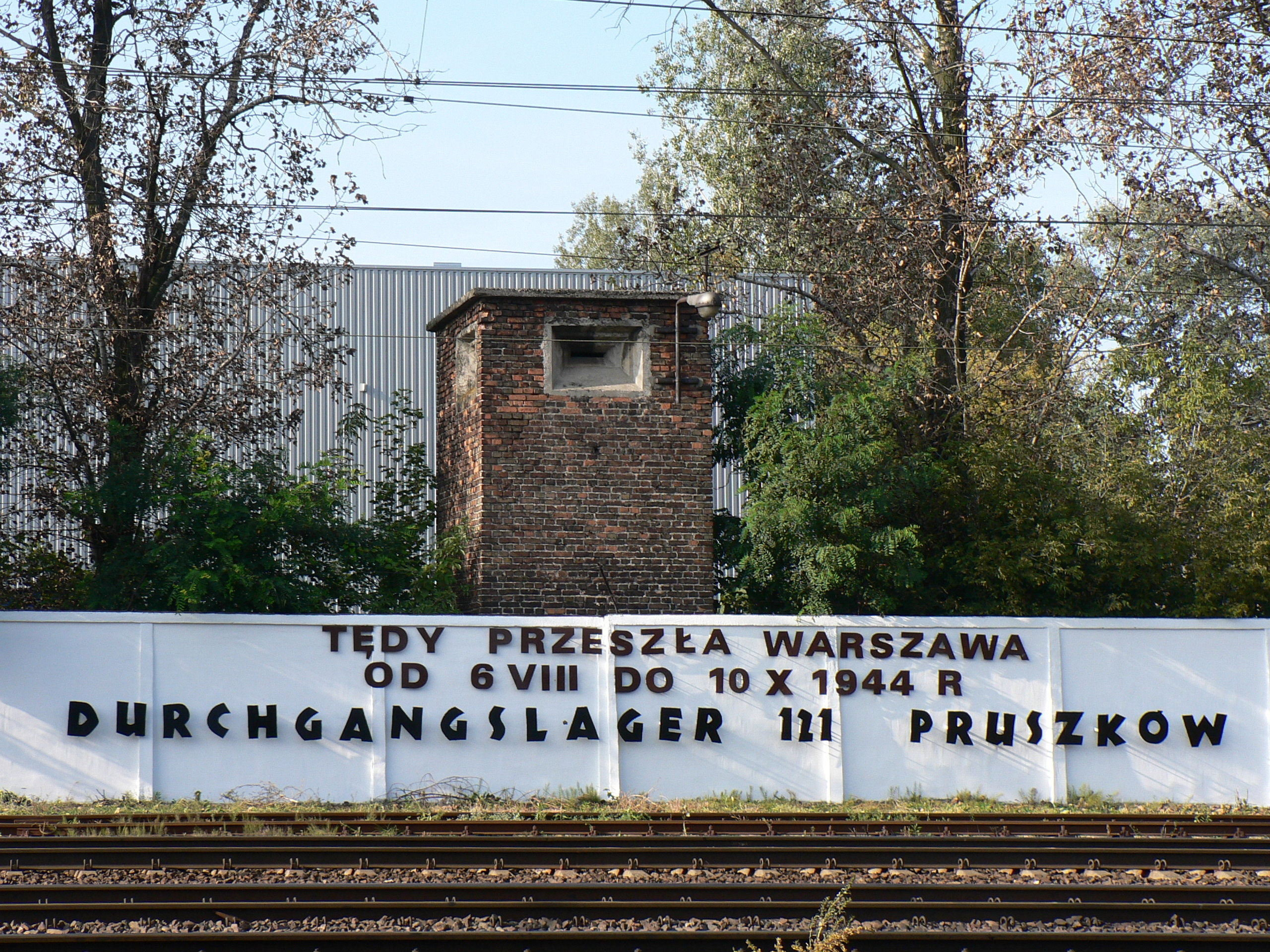
- Where Warsaw passed through inscription on the wall of the former Railway Rolling Stock Repair Works in Pruszkow

- Location within Poland
- Coordinates: 52°10′22.85″N 20°48′26.98″E
- Other names: Durchgangslager 121
- Location: Poland under German occupation (General Government), Pruszków
- Built by: Nazi Germany
- Operated by: around 100 Wehrmacht soldiers several dozen Soviet prisoners of war
- Commandant: Kurt Sieber; August 1944–December 1944
- Original use: Railway Rolling Stock Repair Works
- Operational: 6 August 1944–16 January 1945
- Inmates: Poles
- Number of inmates: 390–550 thousand
- Killed: several thousand people
- Website: http://www.dulag121.pl

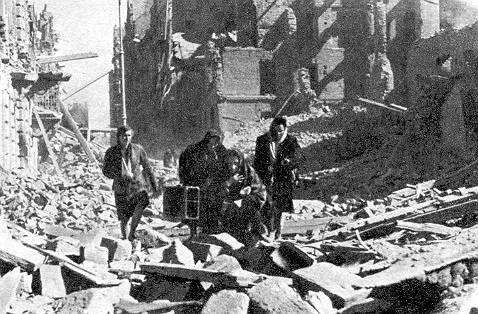
Refugees escaping the city during the Warsaw Uprising

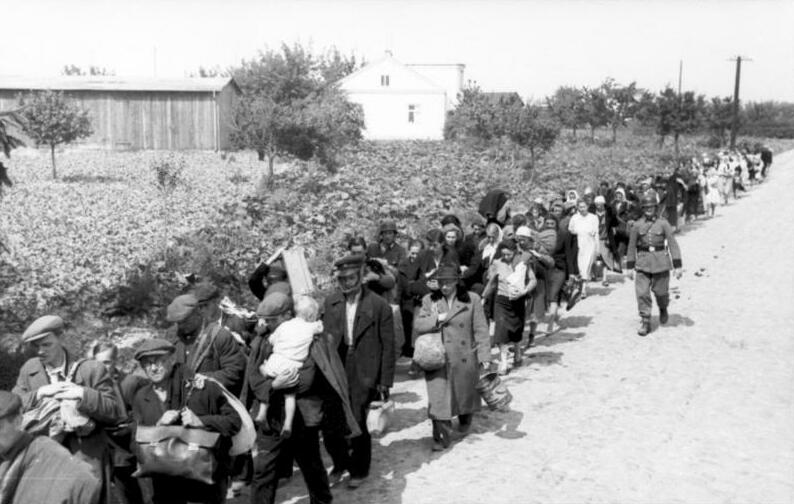
Refugees on their way to Pruszków

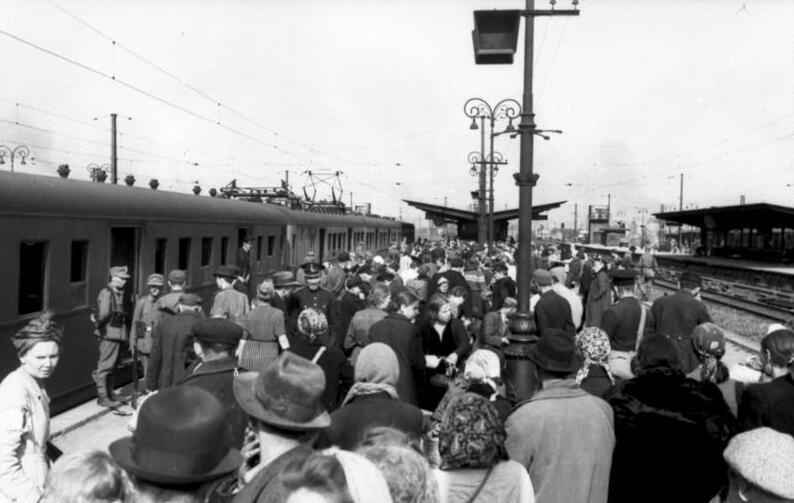
Warszawa Zachodnia station in Warsaw. Waiting for transport to Pruszków

Arrival of transport on the railroad siding in Pruszków

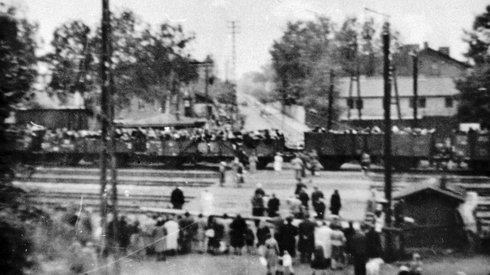
Arrival of transport on the railroad siding in Pruszków

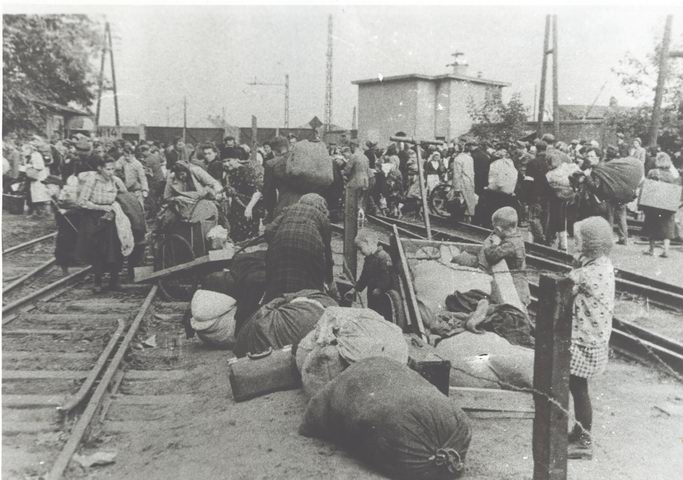
Refugees upon arrival in Pruszków

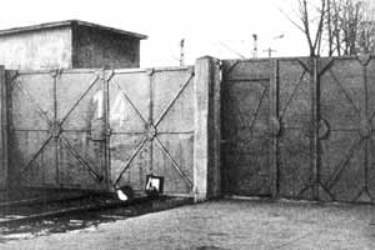
Pruszków – gate No. 14

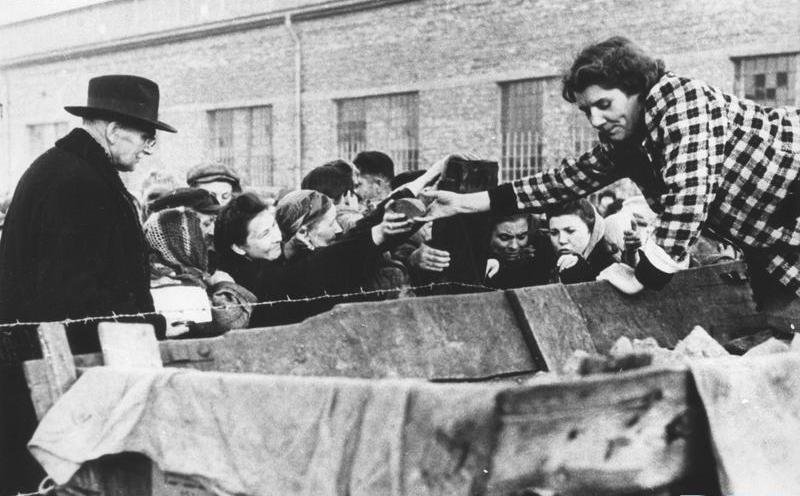
Bishop Antoni Szlagowski among the prisoners of Dulag 121

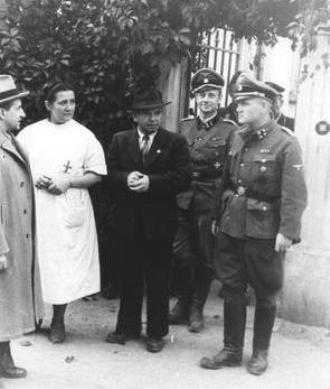
International Red Cross and Red Crescent Movement delegate Dr. Paul Wyss (center) in conversation with SS-Sturmbannführer Gustav Diehl (right)

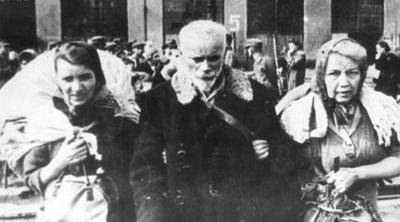
Photo purportedly showing President Stanisław Wojciechowski while in the camp

Dulag 121 camp in Pruszków (Durchgangslager 121 Pruszków) was a Nazi transit camp where civilian population from Warsaw and surrounding areas, expelled from their homes during and after the Warsaw Uprising, was gathered.

The camp was established on 6 August 1944, on the premises of the former Railway Rolling Stock Repair Works in Pruszków. It operated until mid-December 1944, and in a residual form, until 16 January 1945. During this period, between 390,000 and 410,000 people passed through Dulag 121, among whom tens of thousands were deported to forced labor in the depths of the Reich or sent to concentration camps after a short stay in the camp. Due to diseases, exhaustion, or at the hands of guards, hundreds to several thousand prisoners of Dulag 121 perished. However, over 30,000 people managed to leave the camp thanks to the assistance of the Polish personnel employed there.

== Origins ==
The transit camp in Pruszków was established on the sixth day of the Warsaw Uprising (6 August 1944). It was created based on the order of SS-Obergruppenführer Erich von dem Bach-Zelewski (the commander of German forces designated to suppress the uprising), which was agreed upon two days earlier with the administrative authorities of the General Government. The first transport of expelled Warsaw residents arrived at the camp on 7 August. It included about 5,000 survivors of the Wola massacre who were first gathered in the church of St. Adalbert and then driven on foot to Pruszków.

The establishment of the Pruszków camp was associated with a change in German plans regarding the fate of the inhabitants of the rebellious Warsaw. On the evening of 5 August 1944, Bach partially revoked Hitler's order from 1 August, which commanded the total extermination of the city's inhabitants regardless of age or sex. Bach prohibited his units from killing women and children but maintained the order to eliminate all Polish men, both captured insurgents and civilians. This decision was not so much motivated by humanitarian concerns as by pragmatic calculation. Bach quickly realized that mass murders only increased the Poles' will to resist, and German soldiers engaged in killings, rape, and looting were unable to conduct offensive actions against the insurgents. Moreover, from the very beginning, he intended to suppress the uprising through a combination of political and military factors, fearing that the use of purely coercive measures would prevent him from achieving the main goal – namely, the rapid elimination of the dangerous hotspot behind the Eastern Front, which Warsaw engulfed in rebellion. On 12 August Bach further softened Hitler's order by issuing a prohibition on the killing of Polish civilian men. In addition to the aforementioned reasons, the economic aspect was also taken into account at that time. At this stage of the war, the Third Reich could not afford to waste such a large reservoir of potential labor. Therefore, extermination was replaced by the complete displacement of Warsaw's population. Contrary to official assurances that the aim of the displacement action was solely to ensure the safety of civilians by removing them from the front zone, the Germans were only interested in exploiting refugees as slave labor and plundering and destroying the city itself. According to the new guidelines, Dulag 121 camp in Pruszków was to serve as a transit camp for the displaced population of Warsaw. After a short stay in the camp, people fit for work were to be sent to farms, industrial plants, and camps in the Reich.

Dulag 121 was organized on the premises of the Railway Rolling Stock Repair Works located in the Żbików district of Pruszków. Several factors spoke in favor of choosing this location. In autumn 1939 a transit camp for Polish prisoners of war was operational on the premises of the works, with a capacity of 2,000 people at that time. Later (from 20 January 1941), a labor camp for Jews was located there for a while. Thanks to this, in 1944, there were still elements of protective infrastructure (bunkers, guard towers) on the premises that could be adapted for the needs of the new camp. This place was also chosen due to its favorable location – a short distance from the capital and a convenient position on the railway line from Warsaw to Skierniewice, which allowed for efficient "unloading" of the camp. Dulag 121 was organized and supplied by the civilian administration of the General Government, but Bach exercised control over it.

Initially, Dulag 121 operated in conditions of complete improvisation and chaos. The leadership rested in the hands of SA Oberführer Stephan and SA Sturmbannführer August Polland, who proved to be completely incapable of managing the camp and receiving the incoming transports. According to the testimony of a worker from the Main Welfare Council, Władysław Mazurek, Stephan, unable to efficiently lead the camp, after 2 or 3 days got drunk, beat people, quarreled with Germans, left the camp, and never returned. He was then replaced by Polland, who being almost constantly drunk, walked around the camp with a revolver in his hand, shooting and beating at every opportunity. The situation normalized somewhat only around 10 August, with the arrival of a new crew consisting of Wehrmacht and SS soldiers.

== Dulag 121 and its staff ==
The area of the Pruszków camp was 48 hectares. Its infrastructure consisted of nine large production halls and several smaller buildings. The camp was surrounded by a concrete wall with four gates. The German staff were quartered in the "Palace" office building and the former railway school building. The production halls served the following functions:

- Hall No. 5 (wagon repair shop) served as a transitional space for the initial selection of the displaced. Additionally, according to some accounts, men considered fit for work were also gathered there.
- Hall No. 1 (wagon repair shop) – this is where people deemed unfit for work, destined for dispatch to the General Government territories, were placed.
- Hall No. 2 (technical services unit) – it housed the camp infirmary, sick bay, and a small infectious diseases hospital. A German medical commission also conducted "selection" of the displaced there, assessing their ability to work.
- Hall No. 3 (blacksmith shop) – railway and tram workers with their families were accommodated there, and later on, men deemed fit for work.
- Hall No. 4 (machine tool repair shop) – women deemed fit for work were placed there.
- Hall No. 6 (locomotive shed) – men deemed fit for work were placed there, including individuals considered particularly dangerous by the Germans. Because of this, the hall was heavily guarded. Many people detained in Hall No. 6 were deported to concentration camps, including Mauthausen-Gusen. In September 1944, Hall No. 6 was dismantled, and fit-for-work individuals were subsequently directed to Halls No. 3 and 4.
- Hall No. 7 (carpentry shop) initially served as a transitional space, and after the capitulation of Mokotów and Żoliborz, captured soldiers of the Home Army were placed there.
- Hall No. 8 (ventilation unit) – from September 1944, it operated as a hospital where individuals suspected of infectious diseases were placed. Later, the hall served as accommodation for prisoners of war.
- Hall No. 9 (construction warehouse) – it housed kitchens and warehouses.

The camp commander in Pruszków was Colonel Kurt Sieber, who oversaw a staff of about 100 soldiers from the Wehrmacht. In addition to Germans, the staff also included several dozen Soviet prisoners of war, who were used for cleanup work. Sieber, an "old-fashioned" officer, was characterized by a humane attitude towards the interned Poles in Pruszków. One of his first orders was to prohibit shooting within the camp.

Sieber – formally the commander of Dulag 121 – was practically responsible only for maintaining order in the camp and logistical matters. The fate of the prisoners, however, was decided by his deputies from the SS, namely SS-Sturmbannführer Gustaw Diehl and SS-Untersturmführer Wetke. Both resided in the so-called "green wagon", near which stood two freight cars serving as the camp's prison. Diehl was responsible for the functioning of the camp's counterintelligence, as well as for the selection of newcomers and organizing deportations. It was probably he who decided on the size and destination of each outgoing transport from the camp. In organizing selections and deportations, Diehl was supported by several officials from the Pruszków Labor Office, led by the notorious SA Sturmbannführer August Polland, known for his brutality. Władysław Mazurek recalled that Polland:

With special animal satisfaction, tore families apart, and woe to those who, wanting to stay together, betrayed themselves with some imprudent word or behavior in his presence – they had to be torn apart, even if both had the same qualifications, and thus, for example, were suitable for work in the Reich, they did not leave together. For the joy of this executioner was the sight of inflicted pain, harm, tears, and despair. If he couldn't do anything else to a solitary person, he took away their beloved dog, the only companion after the loss of loved ones, a canary, or meager belongings.

The chief medical officer of the camp was Stabsarzt Adolf König (from 12 August 1944), while his deputies were Stabsarzt Peter Klenner and – for a short time – Unterarzt Tössman. In November 1944, König left Dulag 121, and he was replaced as chief medical officer by Dr. Herbert Weigel, who held this position until the end of the camp's existence. Transiently, during the period of the greatest influx of people, several German military doctors also worked in the camp. Soviet prisoner-of-war medical personnel cared for individuals diagnosed with tuberculosis or infectious diseases. A small infectious diseases hospital was organized in Hall No. 2, with Dr. Aleksander Anikiejev as its head physician. Additionally, female Polish translators were assigned to assist the German medical personnel. German doctors generally displayed a fairly friendly attitude towards Poles, manifested in "turning a blind eye" to attempts to protect the displaced from deportation to the Reich (under the pretext of illness or disability). However, while German doctors prepared lists of individuals deemed unfit for work, the final decisions regarding release from the camp were always made by SS men from the "green wagon".

=== Polish staff ===
Dulag 121, unlike other German camps, allowed external Polish medical and kitchen staff to work, who also enjoyed relative freedom. Polish services, distinguished from the crowd by white aprons with red cross bands, operated in the camp and took care of the wounded and sick, who were placed in both local hospitals and private apartments. Many members of the Polish staff were directed to Pruszków by the Polish Underground State. Others were transported to the camp as prisoners but found work, such as Halina Chmielewska, who had been arrested for her role in the Warsaw Uprising but ended up running an outpatient clinic in camp block 1.

The camp kitchen typically employed between 200 and 400 people, with nearly 480 workers at its peak. The kitchen staff was led by Ewa Maria Bogucka. The camp kitchen operated almost continuously, preparing daily between 20,000 and 25,000, occasionally even up to 35,000, half-liter portions of soup. Additionally, in the morning and evening, the kitchen staff tried to distribute food rations to the refugees, consisting of half a liter of grain coffee and 200–250 grams of rye bread. Mobile canteens were also organized on the camp premises (led by engineer Stanisław Zabielski), which provided the refugees with cigarettes, essential items, and additional food rations for purchase. The usefulness of these canteens is evidenced by the fact that during the period from 25 September to 13 October 1944, the canteen turnovers amounted to nearly 500,000 młynarkis.

The camp's medical services were staffed by dozens of volunteer doctors and nearly 300 nurses. Lieutenant Doctor Kazimierz "Bożymir I" Szupryczyński – a railway doctor and head of the medical services of the VI District of the Home Army – directed all his medical staff and auxiliary staff of the Women's Military Service to help the displaced. Additionally, he engaged volunteers such as doctors and nurses from Pruszków. According to some sources, at the peak of its operations, the medical services of Dulag 121 employed about 500 people – including 102 doctors, 122 nurses, and numerous Daughters of Charity. The German authorities appointed Jadwiga Kiełbasińska, a midwife from Milanówek who spoke German fluently and enjoyed the full trust of the occupation authorities, as the head of the Polish medical staff. Kiełbasińska, illegally using the title of medical doctor, was not well-liked by the Polish staff. However, she tried to help the refugees without losing the trust of the Germans. Among other things, Kiełbasińska organized a hospital in the Perełka villa in Milanówek, where many insurgents were hidden with her knowledge.

There was also a group of men among the Polish staff who, under various pretexts, obtained the right to enter the camp premises. They usually worked as porters or carters (the camp stable had three horses and four carts). Additionally, each hall had its manager – a Hallenleiter – appointed to this position by the Pruszków delegation of the Main Welfare Council. The hall chief's function was associated with numerous privileges and allowed effective assistance to the refugees.

There were also the so-called "golden sisters" or "white hyenas" operating within the camp. These were women who, impersonating members of the Polish medical staff, extorted money and valuables from the refugees in exchange for alleged assistance in getting released from the camp. Some of them also worked as Gestapo informants. The remaining Polish camp staff tried to counteract the activities of the "golden sisters".

The Polish staff tried to protect the population from deportation to concentration camps or forced labor. For this purpose, efforts were made to classify as many displaced people as possible as "wounded" or "sick" (the "diagnoses" of tuberculosis and other infectious diseases were especially effective) – therefore unfit for work. Employment in the camp kitchen also protected against deportation (this is how literati Stanisław Dygat and Stefan Otwinowski were saved, among others). Displaced people were also removed from the camp in other, sometimes very risky ways – for example, by dressing them in uniforms of the Polish medical staff (this was possible until the Germans introduced the obligation for staff members to have passes with photos) or hiding them in wagons leaving the camp. Some refugees left Dulag under the pretext of employment in work teams carrying out cleaning work outside the camp or at night – through a small gate in the wall on Warsztatowa Street, to which Polish railwaymen had the key. In total, about 30,000 detainees were evacuated from the Pruszków camp. Additionally, as part of the "Raków" operation, railwaymen from Electric Commuter Rail facilitated the escape of nearly 1,000 people from transport.

Among the refugees liberated from the camp in this manner were many individuals who had made significant contributions to science, culture, or society, and even members of the resistance movement. Through the efforts of the Polish staff, the following were freed: former President of the Republic of Poland Stanisław Wojciechowski; government delegate for the Warsaw Voivodeship Józef "Niemira" Kwasiborski; eleven professors from the Warsaw University of Technology; writers Tadeusz Breza, Stanisław Dygat, Wilam Horzyca, Stefan Otwinowski, Maria Rodziewiczówna, and Jerzy Zawieyski; columnist Stefan "Wiecha" Wiechecki; graphic artist Eryk Lipiński; Professor Walery Goetel (rector of the AGH University of Krakow); figures from the film industry such as Antoni Bohdziewicz (director and screenwriter) and Marian Wyrzykowski (actor and director), and many others. Due to their advanced age, individuals like Wincenty Tomaszewicz were released. However, assisting prisoners was associated with significant risk. Many members of the Polish staff were punished with the revocation of passes and arrest. Several people were deported to concentration camps. Additionally, there are records of four cases where Germans murdered people who were aiding the refugees.

While the Polish staff had many means to provide temporary assistance to the refugees, they had little influence on the overall situation in the camp. In particular, they were strictly prohibited from participating in "selections" and forming transports destined for the depths of the Third Reich.

== Camp operation ==
The influx of people to Dulag 121 was highly irregular and depended on the situation on the insurgent fronts. Transportations with displaced Varsovians usually arrived at the camp parallel to the Germans' conquest of individual districts of the capital:

- 7–8 August: from Wola;
- 9–14 August: from Ochota;
- 19 August – 13 September: from Praga;
- 22 August: from Sielce and Lower Mokotów;
- 24 August: from the vicinity of Krakowskie Przedmieście;
- 31 August – 5 September: from the Old Town;
- 2–3 September: from Sadyba;
- 5–9 September: from Powiśle;
- 12–17 September: from Bielany and Marymont;
- 14–23 September: from Solec;
- 25–28 September: from Old Mokotów;
- 28 September – 1 October: from Żoliborz;
- 2–10 October: from Śródmieście.

The inhabitants from the nearest areas of Warsaw were also evacuated to the camp in Pruszków: Anin, Babice, Bemowo, Boernerowo, Jelonki, Kobyłka, Łomianki, Młociny, Tłuszcz, Ursus, Wawer, Wawrzyszew, Włochy, and Zielonka, as part of the German plan to thin out the Polish population within a 35-kilometer radius from the capital.

In the early days of Dulag 121's existence, the refugees were moved on foot to Pruszków. In the following weeks, they were brought by train, usually from Warszawa Zachodnia station. Varsovians were brought to Pruszków by both the Skiernewice Railway trains and EKD trains. The latter stopped in Pruszków, from where their passengers (usually brought from the Zieleniak market in Ochota) were driven to the camp through the city by foot along a three-kilometer route. The Skiernewice Railway trains, on the other hand, were unloaded on the premises of Dulag 121 – near gate no. 14. By the end of August and in September 1944, several dozen passenger (from 3 to 6 carriages) and freight trains arrived at the camp daily. Typically, there were between 5,000 and 40,000 refugees in Pruszków at one time. (Note: At the time, Pruszków had a population of several thousand.) A massive influx occurred after the fall of the Old Town, when around 75,000 refugees ended up in Dulag 121. However, the largest number of refugees arrived at the camp after the capitulation of the Warsaw Uprising. During this time, nearly 150,000 people passed through Dulag 121.

Dulag 121 was unable to accommodate all the refugees. To partially relieve the overcrowded Pruszków camp, the Germans were forced to temporarily create several sub-camps in neighboring towns. These included Ursus (on the premises of the National Engineering Works), Piastów (in the rubber factory Tudor and Piastów), Ożarów Mazowiecki (in the cable factory and glassworks), Włochy (in the Era factory), Skierniewice (Dulag 142), and Grodzisk Mazowiecki. (Note: A total of 38 transit camps were identified, to which Warsaw residents expelled after the uprising were sent. They were located, among others, in Groty near Babice, Jelonki, Laski, Łomianki, Niepokalanów, Pomiechówek, Rembertów (liberated on September 12), Zakroczym, Żabieniec, which were close to the capital. The exiles were also placed in camps organized at a considerable distance from Warsaw, i.e. in Brzeg, Działdowo, Głogów, Legnica, Łambinowice, Namysłów, Oleśnica, Opole, Piła, Prądnik, Stargard, Szczakowa, Sołtysowice.(Exodus Warszawy (1992, pp. 50–51))) The supervision over these camps was exercised by the command of Dulag 121 in Pruszków, specifically SS-Sturmbannführer Diehl. The camps in Ursus and Piastów operated in the first weeks of October 1944. After the capitulation of the uprising, they accommodated nearly 50,000 civilian residents of Warsaw. Meanwhile, POWs of the Home Army were taken to transit camps in Ożarów (operating from 4-15 October 1944) and Skierniewice. Approximately 11,668 and 3,000 POWs passed through these camps respectively.

On 20 August 1944, Dulag 121 was visited by Auxiliary Bishop of Warsaw, Bishop Antoni Szlagowski. He intervened in the camp's command demanding the release of imprisoned clergymen and respecting the principle of not separating families. Despite the promises made by the Germans, the situation of the refugees did not change. The camp authorities only agreed to release the imprisoned clergymen and allowed three priests (Note: They were Father Marian Sikora and Father Victor Bartkowiak (Pallottines) and Father Orest Emilian Jaworski (Basilian). They performed baptisms and even weddings. In addition, according to some accounts, the pastor of the Żbik parish, Father Franciszek Dyżewski, was said to have celebrated Mass at the camp (Zaborski (2010, p. 97)).) to serve as camp chaplains.

On 5 September 1944, the camp was visited by SS-Obergruppenführer von dem Bach. Nurse Kazimiera Drescher, accompanying him as an interpreter, did not allow the camp's SS officers to interrupt her and described the actual situation to Bach. He assured her that the irregularities had occurred without his consent and gave his word that they would be rectified. However, no changes were made at Dulag 121, and Sister Drescher, along with two other staff members, was "punished" by being sent to Auschwitz. By the end of the day, the Polish Central Welfare Council delegation was forced to sign a declaration prepared by the Germans, stating that the "liberated" population of Warsaw residing in the transit camp in Pruszków was living under conditions allowed by local resources, had sufficient food, medical and spiritual care, and no abuses were taking place. The Germans threatened to remove the Polish personnel from the camp if the Central Welfare Council staff refused to sign the declaration. This threat prompted the Polish delegation to sign the statement. Later, in a modified form, it was published in the daily newspaper Nowy Kurier Warszawski.

On 18 September 1944, a two-person delegation from the International Red Cross, led by Dr. Paul Wyss (a Swiss citizen), arrived at the camp. The Germans then improvised a comfortable transport for the refugees. Passenger cars were waiting on the platforms, some halls were cleaned up (with part of the population removed in advance), and the prisoners were given better meals. Dr. Jadwiga Oszkielowa, who despite threats from the Germans presented the Red Cross delegates with the true situation of the refugees, was punished by having her access card to the camp revoked. She was also threatened with arrest. After the departure of the Red Cross representatives, the situation in the camp returned to its previous state.

After the capitulation of the insurgent forces in Mokotów, the first transport of prisoners of war arrived at the Pruszków camp, including around 1,200 officers and soldiers of the Home Army. They were accommodated in Hall No. 7. A few days later, around 1,000 Home Army soldiers captured on Żoliborz were brought to Dulag 121. Civilian refugees were strictly prohibited from maintaining contact with the prisoners. On the same day when the transport from Mokotów arrived, the SS officers severely beat a few prisoners. The Home Army soldiers were then rescued by the intervention of Wehrmacht officers. However, all prisoners were ordered to remove the eagles from their insurgent berets and uniforms. Those who resisted had the eagles forcibly removed with knives.

In mid-October 1944, the Germans essentially ceased the expulsion of the left-bank Warsaw population. On 5 November 1944, the Pruszków camp was officially closed, and from that moment, its gradual liquidation began. The activity of the outpatient clinic was limited, and on 12 December, the former Wehrmacht crew left Dulag 121. Control over the camp was then taken over by the local gendarmerie and the labor inspectorate. In reality, the camp continued to function, albeit to a limited extent. Primarily, it imprisoned victims of roundups conducted at railway stations or in suburban towns. On 15 November, a transport of so-called "Robinson Crusoes of Warsaw" (people hiding in the ruins of the city despite the end of fighting) arrived at the camp after being caught during a large roundup. Additionally, around 400 Polish men were held in Barrack No. 13, transported by cars to Warsaw, where they were forced to work on dismantling and transporting equipment, raw materials, tools, cultural goods, furniture, furs, clothing, and bedding looted by the Germans. The camp also served as a warehouse for looted goods. As a result, around 700 prisoners were still in Dulag 121 on 10 January 1945. The transit camp in Pruszków finally ceased to exist on 16 January 1945, when the German crew fled from the approaching Red Army, and the last prisoners left the unguarded camp.

== Conditions in the camp ==
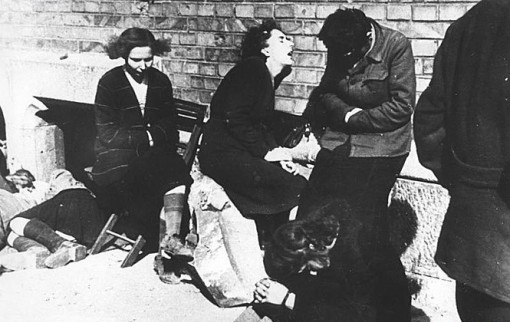
Women from Warsaw's Wola at the Pruszków camp

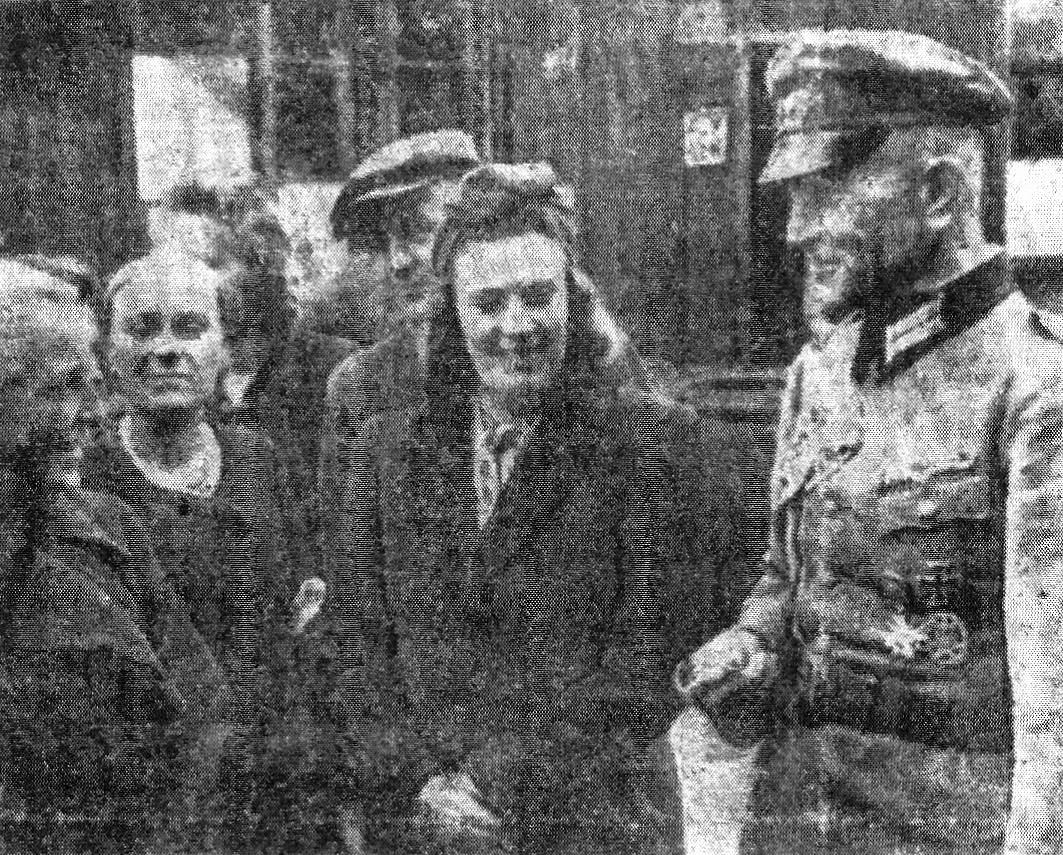
Camp commandant Colonel Kurt Sieber during a visit to the camp kitchen

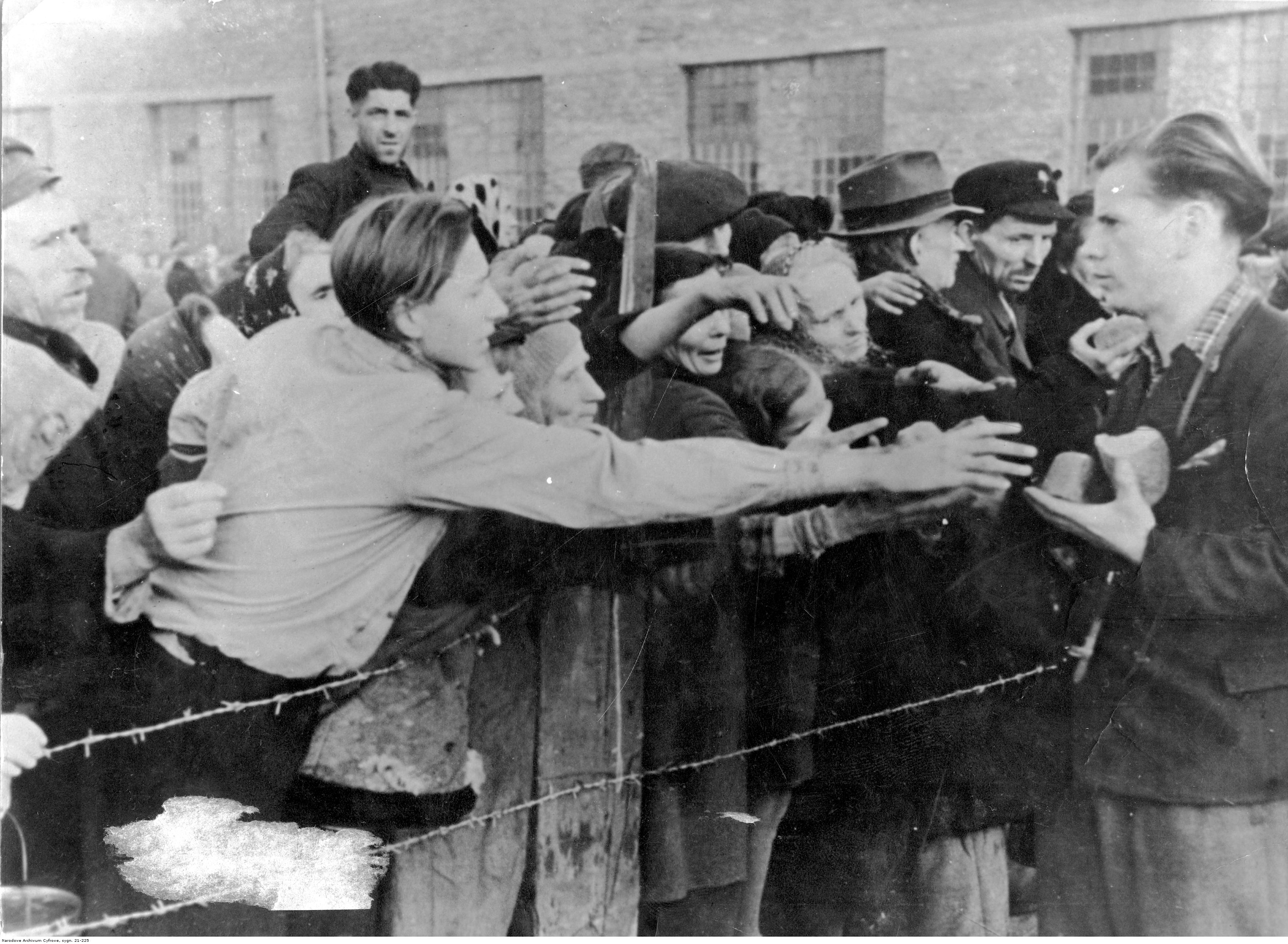
Distribution of food by Red Cross workers

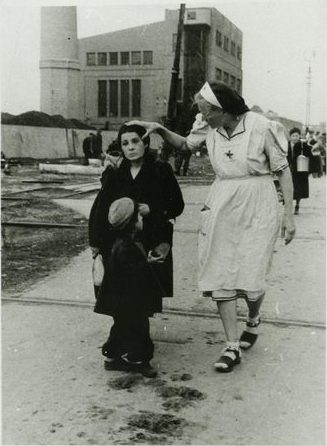
Woman with child photographed with her Red Cross nurse

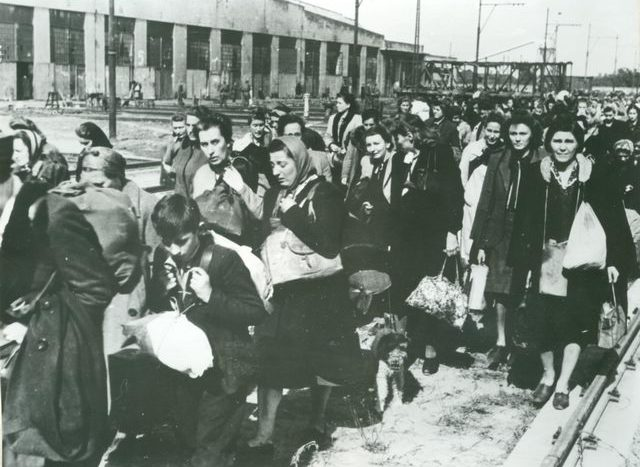
Pruszkow – women and children displaced to General Government areas

The refugees brought to the camp had to jump off the wagons amidst shouts and pushes, as there were no platforms at the Pruszków siding. Then, amidst a corridor of Germans, they were driven into one of the nine production halls. Guards were unallowed to assist the sick, injured, or elderly when disembarking from the wagons or carrying loads. Only Polish personnel recruited by the Central Welfare Council could do this, but their numbers were too few considering the size of the transports. The halls where the refugees were placed were surrounded by barbed wire and supervised by German posts. Leaving the halls was prohibited, so only Polish personnel could move relatively freely within the camp. There were incidents where people standing too close to the fence were harassed by dogs. German agents and military patrols searched the crowd of refugees for hidden Home Army soldiers.

The conditions in the camp were very harsh. (Note: One expelled Varsovian was said to have stated in a conversation with Central Welfare Council workers that of the entire uprising, the two days spent in Pruszków were the hardest (Zaborski (2010, p. 9)).) The individual halls, each of which had to accommodate from 2,000 to 5,000 refugees, were completely unsuitable for habitation. There was a constant stench and such overcrowding that it was often difficult to even find a place to sit. Each hall had inspection trenches filled with rotting waste and vermin, which were not cleaned or even lime-washed for two months. There were shortages of bunks, so the refugees had to nestle on muddy concrete floors, among puddles of water; piles of rags, garbage, and debris; scattered in disorder planks, rails, sheet metal, or parts of repaired wagons. The worst conditions prevailed in the locomotive shed (Hall No. 6), where the Germans placed individuals deemed particularly dangerous. The floors there were covered with oil, grease, and slag. Some straw was scattered in the halls, but it quickly rotted, becoming a breeding ground for lice and other pests. During the peak overcrowding of the camp, the conditions were so harsh that some of the population preferred to camp outdoors, especially in Hall No. 1, regardless of the cold, and often rain.

Standard rations consisted of half a liter of coffee plus 200–250 grams of rye bread for breakfast and supper, and half a liter of soup for lunch. The Polish staff tried to increase and diversify these meager rations as much as possible (organizing, for example, milk soup for children). Up to 480 workers were employed in the camp kitchen, but despite this, hunger prevailed because even when there was no shortage of food, kitchen workers could not keep up with its distribution due to a lack of plates and spoons. Although the nights became colder with each passing day, the halls were not heated. Due to the lack of basic sanitary facilities, it was impossible even to wash hands, let alone maintain cleanliness. Non-potable industrial water flowed from a few taps. Due to the small number of latrines, the population had to relieve themselves in inspection trenches. As a result, the floors of the halls quickly became covered with water and excrement. Pediculosis was widespread in the camp. The refugees also mass contracted typhus and dysentery. The situation was worsened by people were brought to the camp suffering from preexisting conditions of want. During the final phase of the Warsaw Uprising and its capitulation, people were mentally and physically exhausted; starving; sick, injured, and burned; living in ruins and basements without water and light; women had been victims of rape, etc.

German doctors generally were involved at the camp with evaluating the refugees' ability to work after consulting through interpreters with the Polish medical staff. The latter would identify the sicknesses and injuries of the refugees but there was little time for them to treat the numerous patients, their symptoms and the limited medical staff. In Hall No. 2, a sick room and the aforementioned small infectious disease hospital were organized. Initially, one modestly equipped pharmacy served as the hospital equipment. Later, a hospital equipped with basic instruments for simple procedures was organized on the premises of Hall No. 8. More serious cases were referred to the hospital in Tworki, which provided the basic medical facilities for Dulag 121. The Tworki hospital, which previously could accommodate 800 patients at once, had to accommodate up to 4,000 patients during the Warsaw Uprising. The wounded and sick were also directed to other Pruszków hospitals – the county hospital on Piękna Street (accepted several hundred patients) and the hospital in "Wrzesina" (accepted about a thousand patients). However, they quickly became overcrowded, so refugees released from the camp due to their health were also directed to the hospital in Milanówek (no further information on its functioning), as well as to provisional hospital points organized in Brwinów, Grodzisk Mazowiecki, Komorów, Konstancin, Laski, Okęcie, Piastów, Podkowa Leśna, Ursus, and Włochy. Wounded insurgents hidden among the crowd of refugees were tried to be placed in private apartments. In total, at least 55 hospitals, emergency hospital points, and ambulatory and first-aid points were organized in the vicinity of Warsaw, where help was provided to the refugees from Warsaw. Many women who were victims of rape were also brought to Dulag 121. In Komorów, the doctors of the Pruszków camp organized free abortion procedures for them.

In Pruszków, the refugees usually stayed from two to seven days, and sometimes only a few hours, per the results of the selection process carried out by the Gestapo, and the time of stay in the camp – the transport schedule. People unable to work (women with children under 15 years of age, pregnant women, women over 50 years of age, men over 60 years of age, people with visible disabilities or deformities) were sent to various regions of the General Government and left there without means of subsistence. People deemed able to work (men aged 15 to 60 and women aged 15 to 50) were directed to forced labor in the depths of the Reich. Thousands of people were also deported to concentration camps. SS-Sturmbannführer Diehl maintained that all women were taken to the Reich for normal employment in agriculture or industry, and men – depending on the results of the investigation – were sent to forced labor or concentration camps. In reality, the destination of the transport was often decided by chance, and women and children were sent to concentration camps as well as men. For example, at the end of August 1944, the head of the Reich Security Main Office, SS-Obergruppenführer Ernst Kaltenbrunner, recommended to the command of Army Group Center that, due to serious reasons of police security, the basic mass of able-bodied men and women from Warsaw should be directed to work in concentration camps. Only women with small children could be treated as Polish civilian workers and placed at the disposal of the Main Commissioner for Mobilization of Labor. As a result of this order, many residents of the Old Town, which was being captured at that time, were sent to concentration camps.

In the beginning of camps' operation, the German guards behaved very brutally. At that time, sporadic incidents of Poles being murdered in the camp area occurred. During this period, there were also particularly numerous transports to concentration camps. Both individuals destined for camps and those sent to forced labor were taken from Pruszków in sealed wagons. After the Wehrmacht took control of the camp, the refugees were treated more correctly, although there were still cases of prisoners being beaten. After 15 August 1944, the sealing of wagons, which were sent only under guard, was also discontinued. The selections conducted by the Germans in Pruszków were, however, very brutal, and they were carried out hastily and superficially. Families were regularly separated. During the formation of transports leaving Pruszków, the population was packed into wagons in such a crush that cases of suffocation or crushing occurred. Those unable to work were distributed in open coal wagons. Usually, the refugees embarked on a journey of several days without water and food. It was very rare for Polish personnel to manage to reach the railway siding and provide the departing ones with small supplies for the road. One day, near the "green wagon", Polish workers overheard a conversation between SS men who, having dispatched a transport to the Reich without water and food, wondered aloud how many of the deported would arrive alive at their destination.

=== Rescue mission ===
With the consent of the Germans, the care for the population gathered in the Pruszków camp was provided by the Main Welfare Council and the Polish Red Cross, which partially alleviated the difficult situation of the refugees. As early as 6 August 1944, the German commissioner of the city of Pruszków, Walter Bock, summoned representatives of the Pruszków branch of the Main Welfare Council – the chairman, Father Edward Tyszka (parson of St. Casimir parish in Pruszków), and board members: Władysław Mazurek and Dr. Kazimierz Szupryczyński. During the meeting, which was also attended by the district governor of Warsaw, Hermann Rupprecht, and the head of the Pruszków Arbeitsamt, August Polland, Bock informed the Polish attendees about the establishment of the camp, instructing them to organize assistance for the Warsaw refugees, which the German authorities allegedly could not provide. Blankets, bedding, kitchen utensils, and food were allowed to be brought into the camp. On the same day, priests from Pruszków's pulpits appealed to the population to help the refugees. Local welfare committees and the Red Cross provided collected products for the camp's needs.

The Pruszków branch of the Main Welfare Council set up a camp kitchen at Dulag 121 and began to collect food supplies. It also organized the transport of the wounded, sick, and infirm, and together with the Red Cross, it began to organize first aid. Some employees were permanently seconded to the camp. (Note: The camp exposition of the Main Welfare Council was headed by the aforementioned Władysław Mazurek (a veterinarian) (Wawrzyński (2006, p. 78)).) A special "postal" service was established, which delivered packages (up to 300 per day) and correspondence to the camp, as well as collected letters written by people in the camp to their families outside the walls. In early September 1944, a 25-person Registration and Information Department (headed by Teofil Cichoński) was also established at the Pruszków branch of the Main Welfare Council, which created a file containing data on missing persons, deported to the Reich, and family members conducting their search. The Polish camp personnel assisted in gathering information about the missing. Additionally, members of the Main Welfare Council or the Military Women's Service were on duty at railway stations between Warszawa Zachodnia Station and Pruszków, trying to provide drinks and food to the refugees, as well as, whenever possible, taking out of the transports young people, sick or injured individuals, women with children, etc.

The Main Welfare Council and the Red Cross were not the only Polish organizations organizing aid for the refugees from Warsaw. Fundraising and donations were organized by the Railway Social Care under the direction of Stanisław Pieścik and Józef Zieliński, the Volunteer Fire Brigade, local consumer cooperatives, as well as Catholic parishes and orders with their Caritas branches. Assistance to the refugees was spontaneously provided by the inhabitants of Pruszków and nearby towns. In response to the appeal announced in churches, the city's residents began to bring ready-made meals, mess kits, bowls and cutlery, kitchen utensils, and blankets to the camp. Farmers shared their harvests. Many volunteers from Pruszków approached Father Tyszka, declaring their willingness to work in the camp.

The structures of the Polish Underground State also participated in the aid mission for the prisoners of Dulag 121. The commander of the Pruszków VI district of the Home Army, Major Edward "Paweł" Rzewuski, handed over the mobilization reserve: 20 tons of potatoes, 10 tons of flour, a ton of sugar, as well as several hundred kilograms of bacon and lard. The Pruszków branch of the Main Welfare Council received through the county Government Delegate from 100 to 150 thousand PLN weekly for the aid to the prisoners of Dulag 121. The underground authorities and the Red Cross board collectively donated about 2 million PLN for this purpose. Members of the Military Women's Service also handled the transport of medications collected by the Main Welfare Council's Kraków headquarters. Every week, from 10 to 16 Girl Scouts arrived in Pruszków with backpacks full of medicines.

On 24 August 1944, the insurgent radio station Błyskawica broadcast a message and a letter from Pruszków in four languages, which contained an appeal to the International Red Cross for quick assistance to the 100,000 elderly and children held in the camp. The appeals were repeated in the following days. Already on 25 August, the insurgent broadcast was retransmitted by Polish Radio in London, followed by the Anglo-Saxon press. In mid-September, two wagons with donations from the International Red Cross arrived at the camp from Geneva: food, children's clothing, and medicines, which saved many lives.

== Victims ==
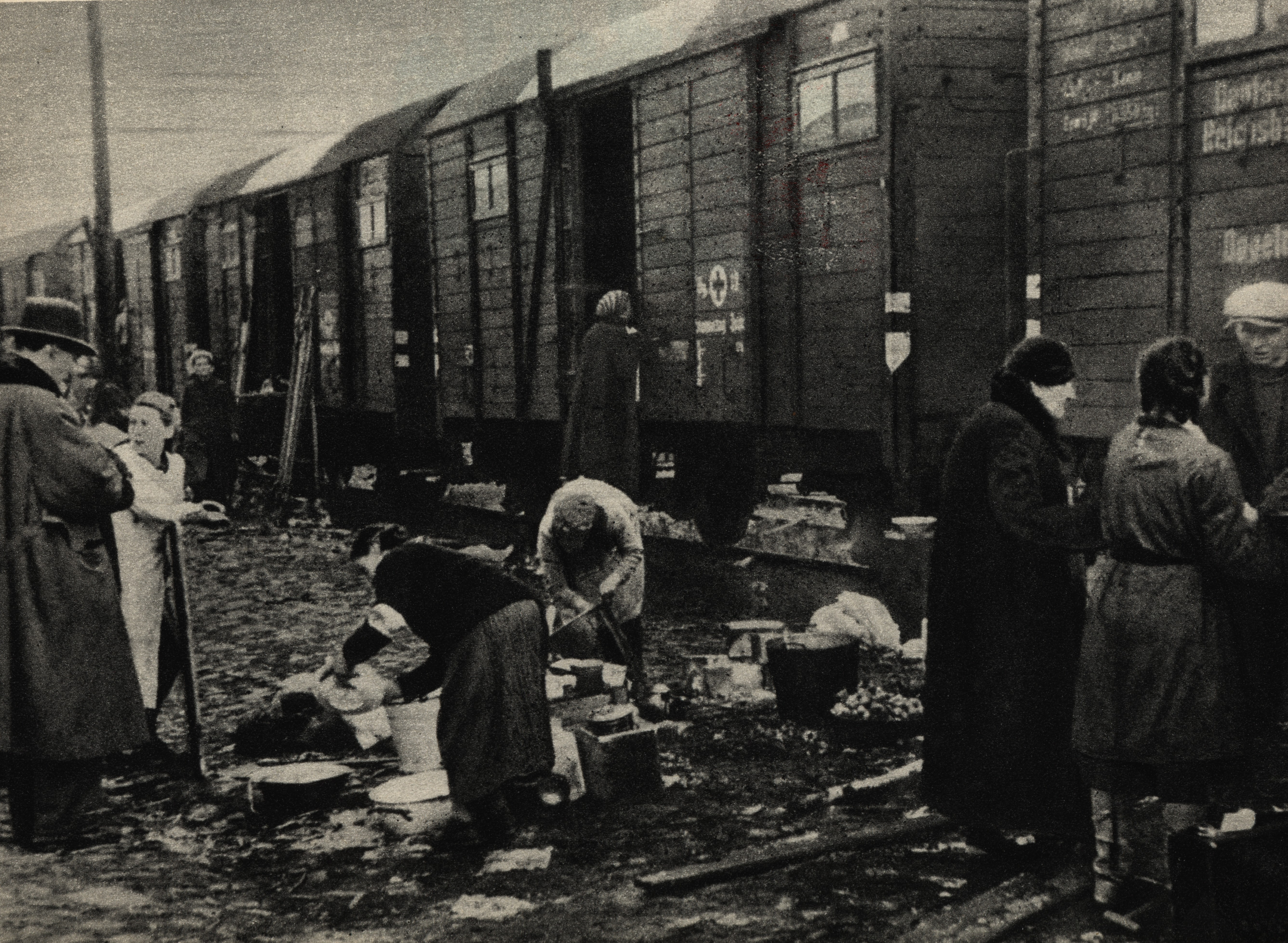
Preparations for the transport departure

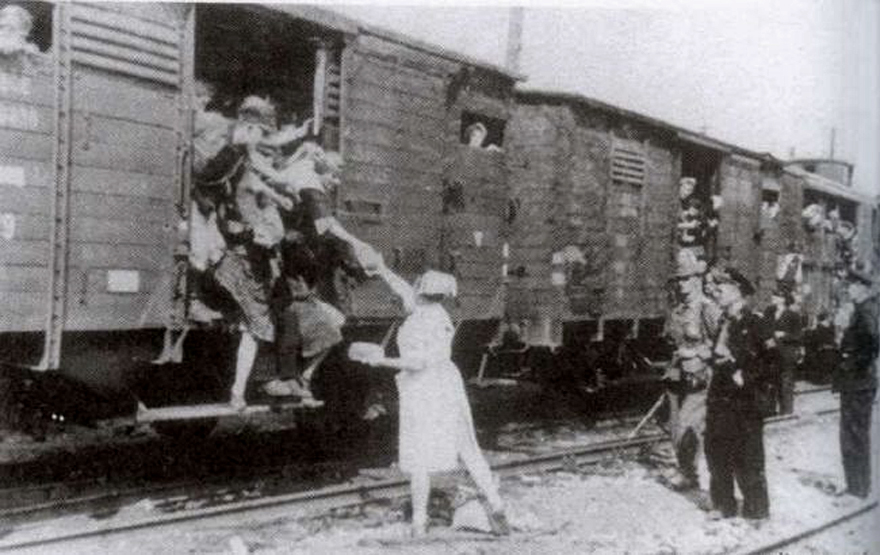
Pruszków – transport leaving the camp

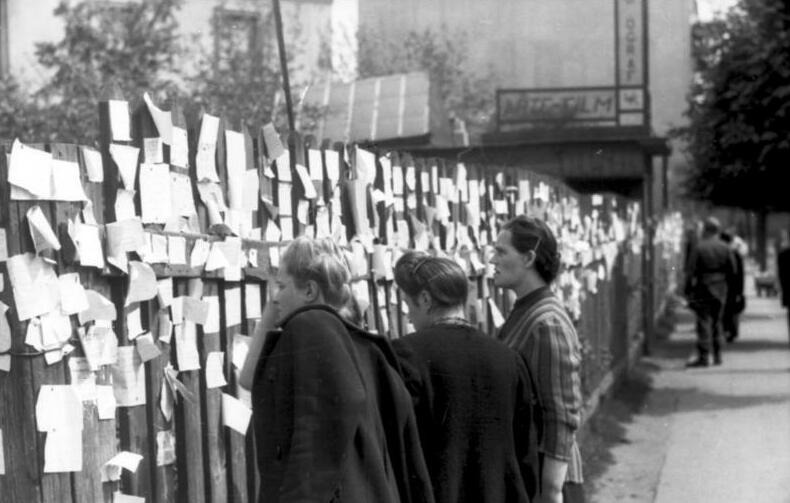
Pruszków. Women seeking information on the missing

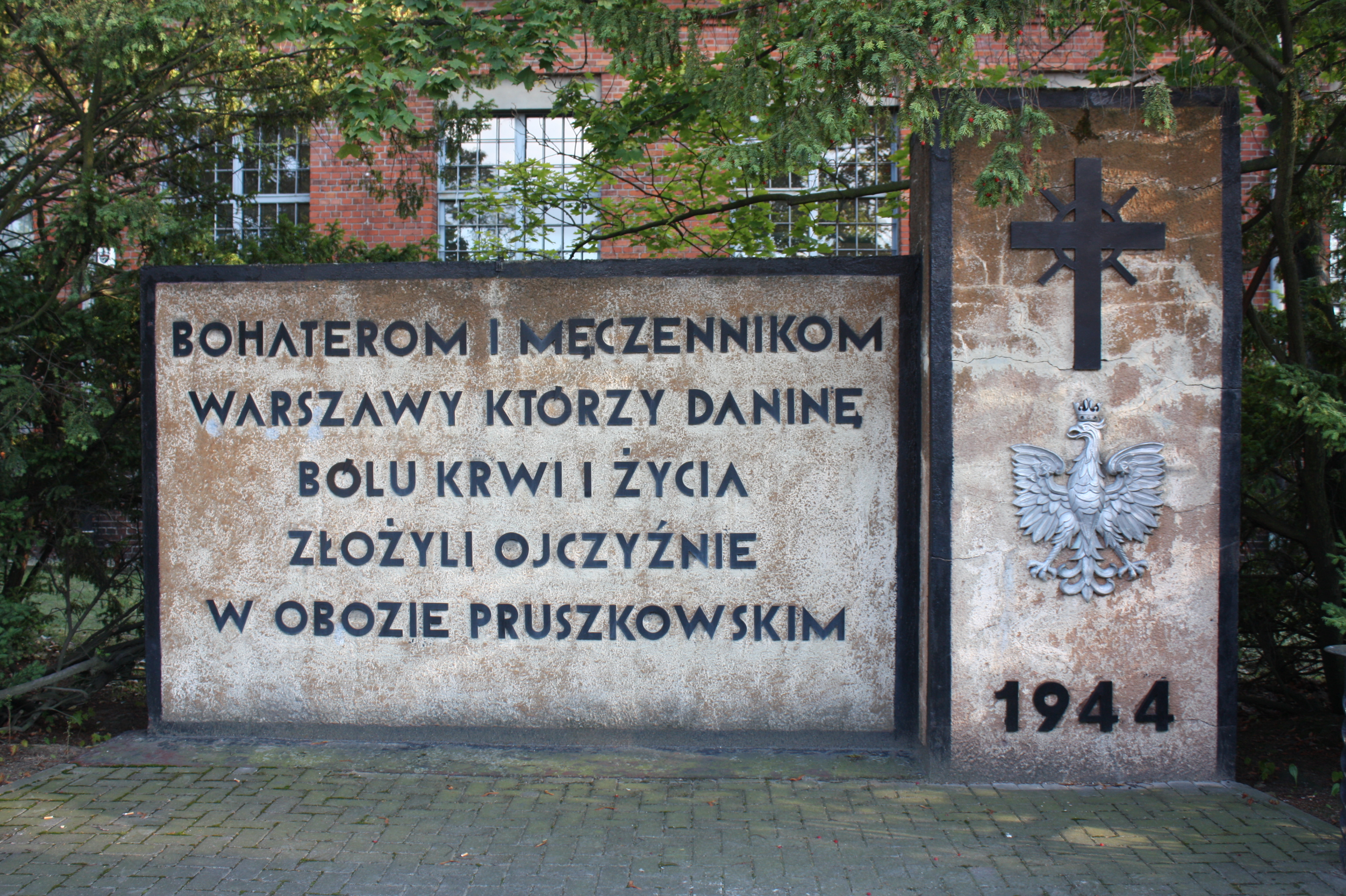
Monument from 1947

It is difficult to estimate how many residents of Warsaw and its vicinity passed through the camp in Pruszków. During the uprising, the Main Welfare Council reported that around 685,000 refugees were sent to Dulag 121 and its sub-camps. This was an approximate number and not based on individual lists. In the following years, Polish and German historiography could not agree on the actual number of prisoners in the Pruszków camp. According to German sources, it was around 350,000 people, (Note: According to German data, 347,524 refugees passed through Dulag 121. Of this number, 153,810 were to be deported for forced labor deep into the Reich; 167,752 were to be displaced to the General Government; and another 25,962 were to be released as sick. However, the above figures do not include, among others, those deported to concentration camps, inmates of the Pruszków sub-camps, escapees, as well as those who died or were murdered at Dulag 121 and the other camps (Wawrzyński (2006, p. 76)).) while Polish sources suggested nearly 550,000. Especially in Poland, the latter number became entrenched in public consciousness for a long time. A breakthrough came with the publication in 2006 of the memoirs of Anna Danuta Sławińska (née Leśniewska), a Polish interpreter in Pruszków, who, based on her own observations and German statistics, (Note: Obtained from a friendly camp administration employee.) estimated that between 390,000 and 410,000 residents of Warsaw passed through Dulag 121.

The exact number of victims of the Pruszków camp is not known. Mortality in the camp increased as transports arrived from the districts of Warsaw that resisted the longest. The population, camping in ruins and basements for weeks without sufficient water and food, arrived in Pruszków in a state of extreme physical and mental exhaustion. Many refugees, especially the elderly, children, and the sick, could not cope with the camp conditions. For example, on 3 September 1944, eight small children being held in Hall No. 1 died. A large percentage of deaths occurred, especially during the influx of transports from the districts of the Old Town, Powiśle Czerniakowskie, Wola, and Śródmieście. Between 3 September and 27 October 1944, only 66 people died in the camp. The camp chaplain, Father Marian Sikora, issued 43 death certificates at that time (including two for people shot while attempting to escape). Among these 66 deceased, there were victims of a train accident that occurred in the camp on 9 September, resulting in the death of 10 people and injuries to 12.

On the territory of Dulag 121, there were cases of murdering young men suspected of participating in the uprising. Executions were also carried out by the Germans when attempting to escape from the camp or transport. Four or five executions of prisoners brought from Warsaw took place near the road in Piastów, at the so-called Papiernia. Prisoners of Dulag 121 were also shot near the clay pits Hosera in Pruszków's Żbików (the number of victims is unknown), in the Potulicki Park in Pruszków (several victims), and near the village of Kanie (around 30 people were allegedly shot there on 9 August). There are also reports that in mid-August 1944 (a few days after the opening of the Pruszków camp), two trucks carrying around 30–50 Poles were brought to the clay pits in Pruszków (at Lipowa Street), who were then shot. A lightly wounded man survived the execution, and he was saved in the Wrzesin hospital located a few hundred meters from that place. The victims probably came from the youth detention center of the Michaelites in Struga near Warsaw. A large group of the center's residents and caretakers were shot on 8 August in the Saxon Garden. According to the account of the center's manager – Father Jan Zawada (based on the testimony of Polish Armed Forces Captain Stanisław Maciejewski) – those residents of the center who were not killed on 8 August were brought to Pruszków, where they were executed on the evening of 9 August.

After the war, 82 unknown Warsaw insurgents and 50 civilians (including 23 women and 8 children) were exhumed from the graves on the camp's territory and transferred to the cemetery in Pruszków on 27 April 1945. From an imitative list compiled by Polish Red Cross employees, it follows that by November 1944 1,559 refugees from Warsaw were interred in suburban cemeteries. It is known that 512 people from Dulag 121, who died between 16 August 1944 and 17 March 1945, rest in the cemetery in Tworki. In the cemetery in Gołąbki in Ursus, there are graves of 70 known individuals and 40 unknown Warsaw residents. In Milanówek, 295 people who died between September 1944 and July 1945 are interred. In turn, the remains of 34 refugees (these are people who died between 5 September and 30 November 1944, including Aleksander Janowski, one of the founders of the Polish Tourist Society) are buried in the cemetery in Komorowo. These are not all burial places for expelled and deceased Warsaw residents. The number of Dulag 121 prisoners who died from diseases or exhaustion may therefore reach several thousand.

Edward Serwański stated (in his work entitled Dulag 121 – Pruszków. August–October 1944) that: Pruszków is a special crime. Its proper character consists primarily of the fact of massing several hundred thousand people, physically exhausted, spiritually exhausted, stripped of everything, and placed in extremely primitive conditions, in a situation where it was almost impossible to organize aid action, and the aim of this was ruthless, brutal segregation, separating families, sending people in transports without food and drink, for forced labor to the German Reich.

== Dulag 121 Museum ==
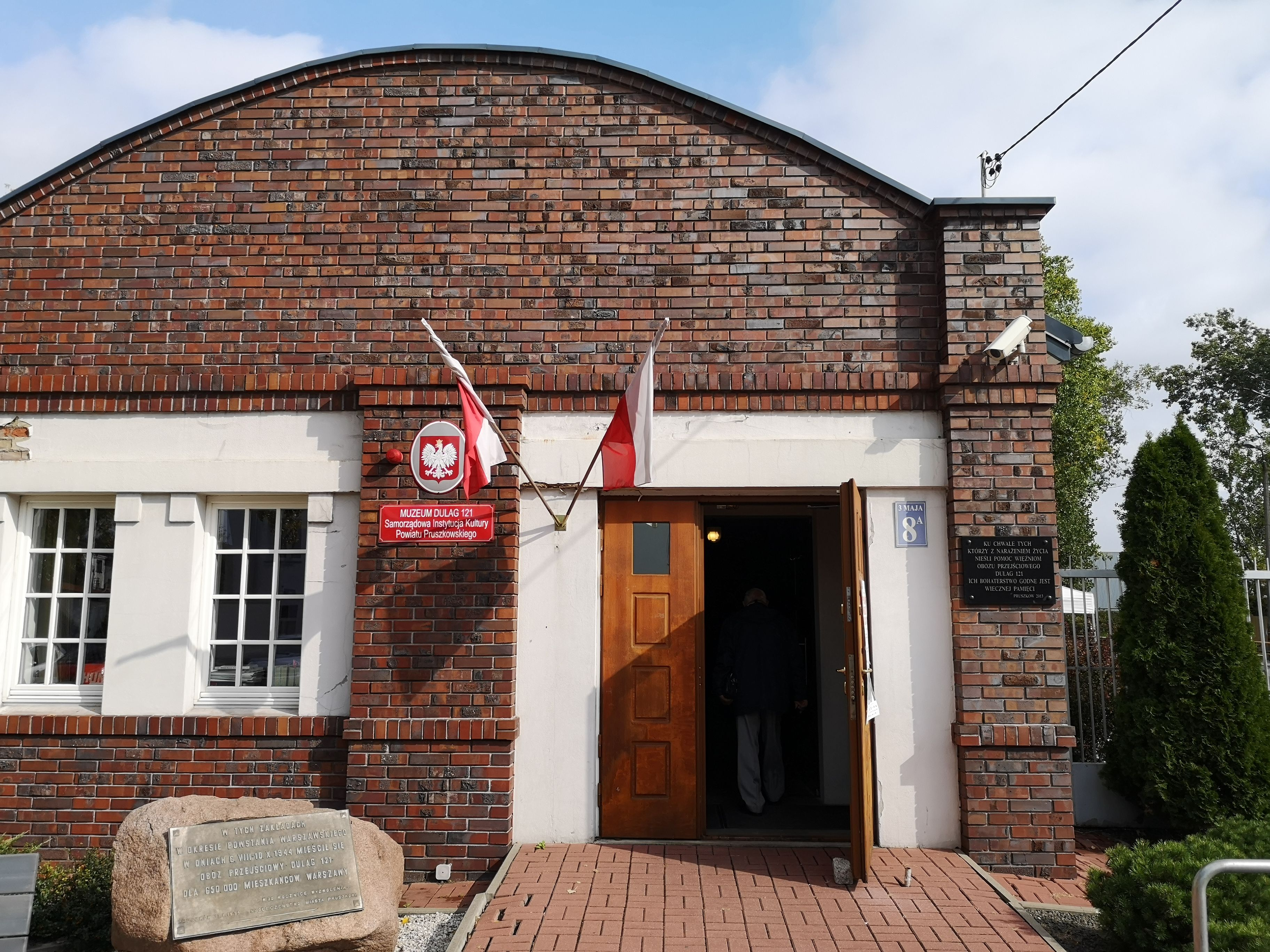
Dulag 121 Museum

On 1 October 2010, a solemn opening ceremony of the Dulag 121 Museum took place, under the honorary patronage of the then Marshal of the Sejm, Bronisław Komorowski. The museum's purpose is to commemorate the martyrdom of the inhabitants of Warsaw imprisoned in the camp and to express gratitude to the people of Pruszków and the surrounding areas for their sacrifice and assistance to the refugees. The Dulag 121 Museum is located on the site of the former camp, in a building specially designed for this purpose. The museum's exhibitions were created in cooperation with the Warsaw Rising Museum.

== Bibliography ==
- Datner, Szymon (1962). Leszczyński, Kazimierz (ed.). Zbrodnie okupanta w czasie powstania warszawskiego w 1944 roku (w dokumentach) (in Polish). Warsaw: MON.
- Dunin-Wąsowicz, Krzysztof (1984). Warszawa w latach 1939–1945 (in Polish). Warsaw: Państwowe Wydawnictwo Naukowe. ISBN 83-01-04207-9.
- Gawryszewski, Andrzej (2005). Ludność Polski w XX wieku (in Polish). Warsaw: Instytut Geografii i Przestrzennego Zagospodarowania im. Stanisława Leszczyckiego PAN. ISBN 8387954667.
- Getter, Marek (2004). "Straty ludzkie i materialne w Powstaniu Warszawskim". Biuletyn IPN (in Polish). 8–9 (43–44).
- Kopf, Stanisław (2001). Wyrok na miasto. Warszawskie Termopile 1944–1945 (in Polish). Warsaw: Fundacja "Wystawa Warszawa Walczy 1939–1945" and Wydawnictwo "Askon". ISBN 83-87545-54-6.
- Przygoński, Antoni (1980). Powstanie warszawskie w sierpniu 1944 r (in Polish). Vol. I, II. Warsaw: PWN. ISBN 83-01-00293-X.
- Serwański, Edward (1946). Dulag 121 – Pruszków. Sierpień – październik 1944 roku (in Polish). Poznań: Wydawnictwo Zachodnie.
- Wawrzyński, Mirosław (2006). "Solidarność ludzka w czasach pogardy". Biuletyn IPN (in Polish). 1–2 (60–61).
- Wawrzyński, Mirosław (2008-08-02). "Wygnańcy". Polityka (in Polish). 31 (2665).
- Wiśniewska, Maria; Sikorska, Małgorzata (1991). Szpitale powstańczej Warszawy (in Polish). Warsaw: Oficyna Wydawnicza "Rytm". ISBN 83-85249-04-4.
- Zaborski, Zdzisław (2010). Durchgangslager 121. Niemiecka zbrodnia specjalna (in Polish). Pruszków: Powiatowa i Miejska Biblioteka Publiczna w Pruszkowie. ISBN 978-83-62144-04-4.
- Zaborski, Zdzisław (2004). Tędy przeszła Warszawa. Epilog Powstania Warszawskiego (in Polish). Warsaw: Wydawnictwo ASKON. ISBN 83-87545-86-4.
- Zalewska, Agnieszka (2011). "Kalendarium tworzenia Muzeum Dulag 121". Przegląd Pruszkowski (in Polish). 2 (84).
- Exodus Warszawy. Ludzie i miasto po Powstaniu 1944. Pamiętniki, relacje (in Polish). Vol. I. Warsaw: Państwowy Instytut Wydawniczy. 1992. ISBN 83-06-01589-4.
- Ludność cywilna w powstaniu warszawskim. Pamiętniki, relacje, zeznania (in Polish). Vol. I. Warsaw: Państwowy Instytut Wydawniczy. 1974. ISBN 83-06-01589-4.
- "Wypędzeni z Warszawy 1944 – Losy dzieci". banwar1944.eu (in Polish). Archived from the original on 2013-08-06.
