= Tworki =

District of Pruszków, Poland

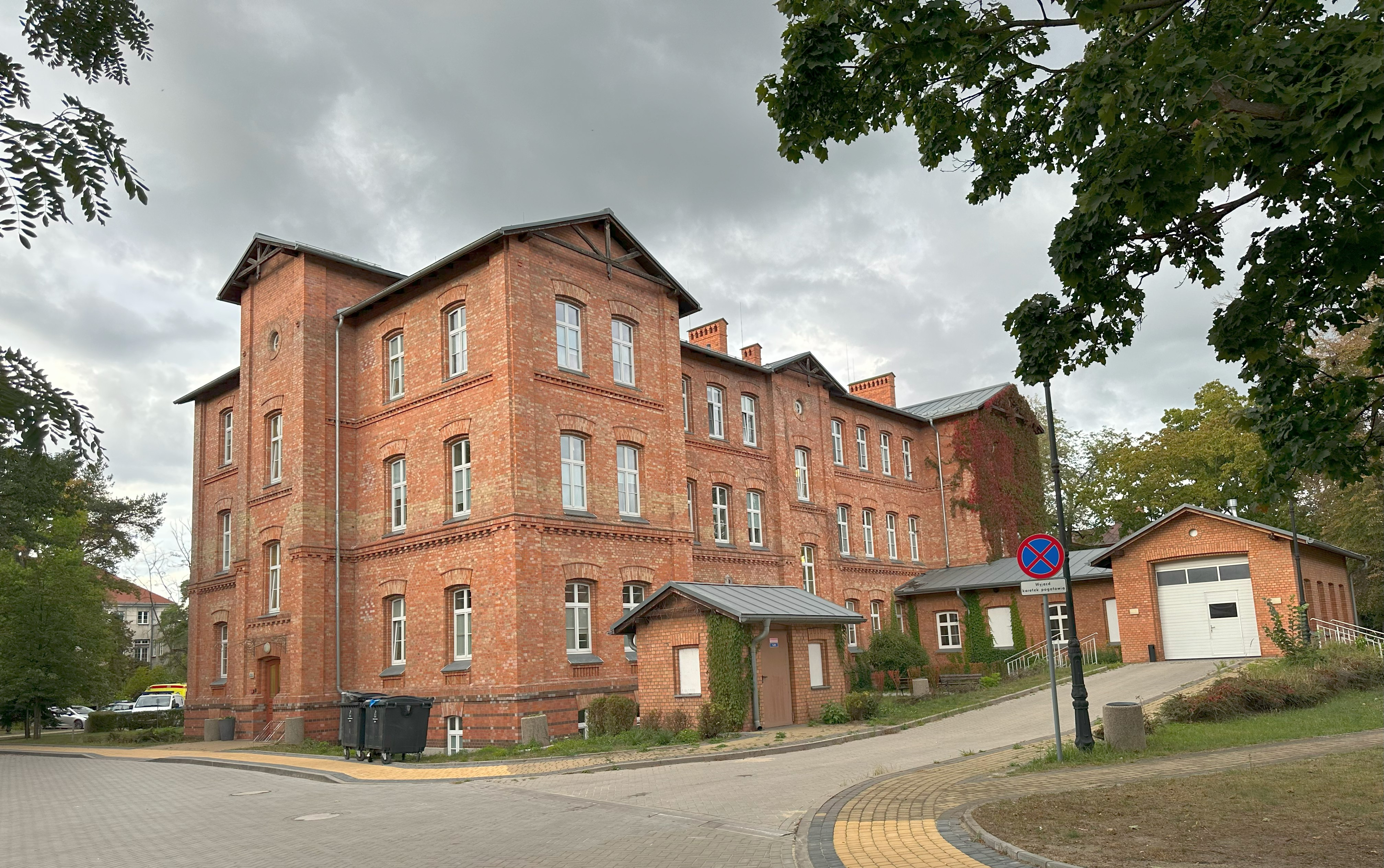
- Hospital

- Location within Poland
- Coordinates: 52°10′27″N 20°49′14″E
- Country: Poland
- Voivodeship: Masovian
- County: Pruszków
- City: Pruszków
- Time zone: UTC+1 (CET)
  - Summer (DST): UTC+2 (CEST)
- Vehicle registration: WPR

Tworki is a district of Pruszków, a city on the outskirts of Warsaw, Poland. It is famous for the large psychiatric hospital, which opened in 1891 and is still operating to this day as a part of the Medical University of Warsaw. It is the site of one of the stations of the Warszawska Kolej Dojazdowa (WKD) commuter railway.
