= Żabieniec, Piaseczno County =

Żabieniec
- Village
- Location within Poland
- Coordinates: 52°3′N 21°2′E
- Country: Poland
- Voivodeship: Masovian
- County: Piaseczno
- Gmina: Piaseczno

Żabieniec [ʐaˈbjɛɲɛt͡s] is a village in the administrative district of Gmina Piaseczno, within Piaseczno County, Masovian Voivodeship, in east-central Poland.
