= Jean-Baptiste De Coster =

Jean-Baptiste De Coster or Jean-Baptiste Decoster may refer to:

- Jean-Baptiste Decoster (guide) (born c. 1763), was a guide for Napoleon Bonaparte during the Battle of Waterloo and later became a battle field guide for tourists
- Jean-Baptiste De Coster (Jesuit) (1896–1968), a Jesuit in Belgium who helped find shelters and saved Jews from the Holocaust.
