= Mokotów Prison Massacre =

War crime during the Warsaw Uprising

Coordinates: 52.2072°N 21.0112°E

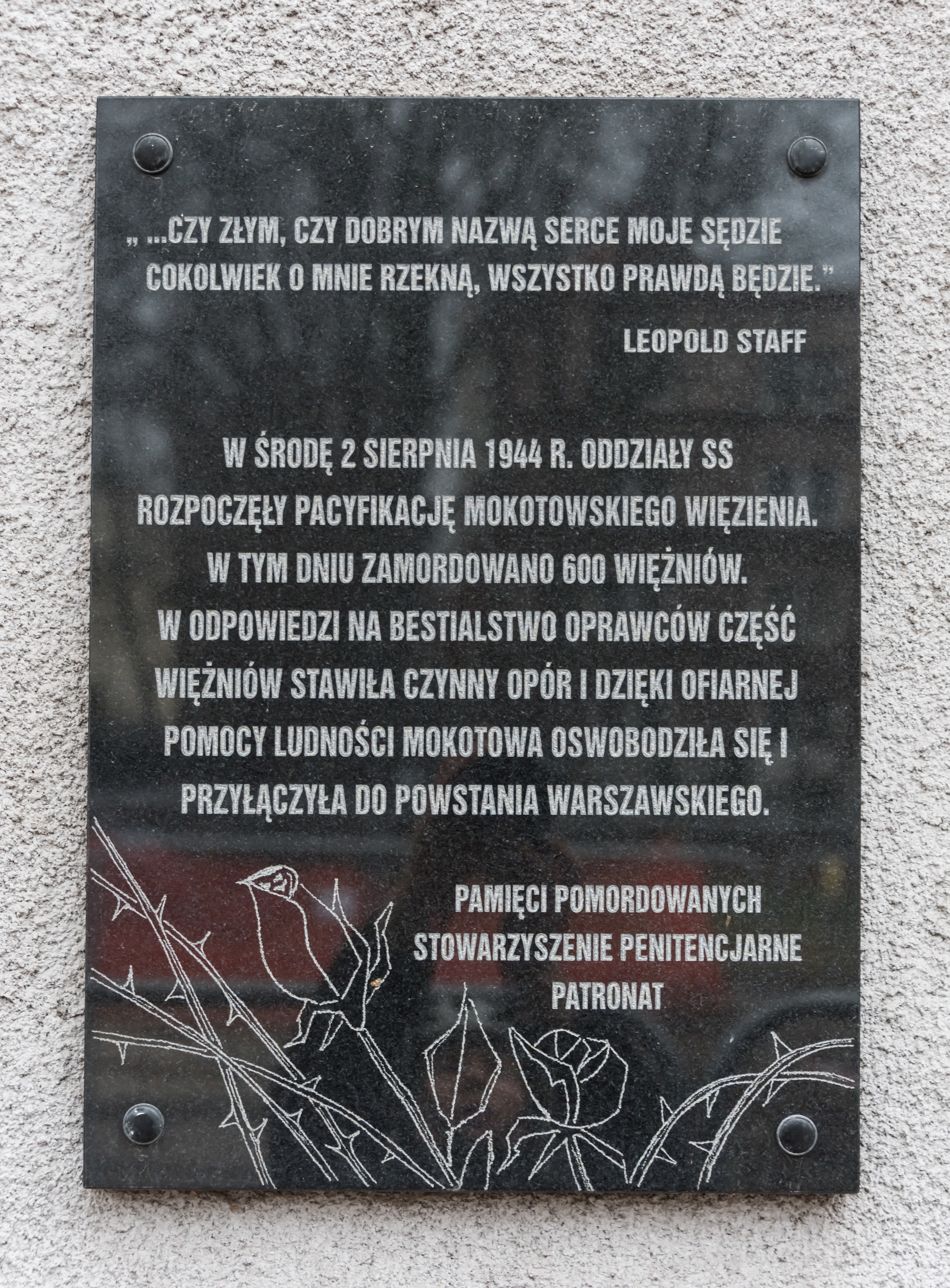
Plaque commemorating the victims of the massacre

The Massacre in the Mokotów prison was a mass murder of residents of the Mokotów Prison in Warsaw by the Germans on the second day of the Warsaw Uprising. On August 2, 1944, soldiers of the Waffen-SS - SS-Pz. Gren. Ausb.-und Ers. Btl. 3 (of SS-Panzer Division "Totenkopf") shot about 600 Poles on the premises of the prison at 37 Rakowiecka Street. It was one of the biggest crimes committed by the Germans in Mokotów during the suppression of the Warsaw Uprising. During the massacre, some prisoners actively resisted the Nazis, which allowed several hundred people to escape to the area controlled by the insurgents.

== Before the outbreak of the Uprising ==
Soon after the Germans entered Warsaw (28 September 1939), the former Polish penitentiary at 37 Rakowiecka Street was adapted for the needs of the occupying forces. The Gerichtsgefängnis in der Rakowieckastrasse 37 was henceforth a prison under the authority of the German special courts (Sondergericht), and its residents remained in the hands of the Gestapo after serving their sentence. In addition to prisoners subordinate to special courts, officers of the Polish Army, who did not fulfil the obligation to register with the German authorities, economic criminals and Germans convicted of criminal offences, were also detained at Rakowiecka Street. The prison was quickly filled and the number of detainees far exceeded its standard capacity. Many Polish employees of the prison secretly cooperated with the underground Service for Poland's Victory – later with the Home Army. Thanks to their help, many people involved in underground activity managed to leave the prison.

In the summer of 1944, the prison was under the authority of Commissioner Hitzinger. On July 23, 1944, in connection with the approaching Eastern Front, the release of prisoners sentenced to imprisonment for up to five years began – mainly Germans and Volksdeutsche, and later Poles. Within five days, 655 people were released, including about 300 Poles. However, as a result of bribery of prison authorities, Hitzinger ordered that the release of the detainees be halted. On August 1, one hour before the uprising broke out, 11 more prisoners were released.

According to the records kept by the deputy head of the prison, court inspector Kirchner, at the time of the outbreak of the uprising there were 794 more prisoners in the prison at 37 Rakowiecka Street, including 41 minors.

== The ''W'' hour ==
Rakowiecka Street was one of the most important centres of German resistance in Mokotów. On August 1, 1944, insurgents from the IV Region of the Home Army (V District "Mokotów") attacked German positions on the whole length of the Rakowiecka street, attacking SS barracks at 4 Rakowiecka Street (SS-Stauferkaserne), airmen's barracks at the entrance of Puławska Street (Flakkaserne), the SGGW building and batteries of anti-aircraft artillery placed in the Mokotow Field. The task of conquering the prison and the neighbouring tenement houses was entrusted to the First Assault Company, commanded by Lieutenant Antoni Figura "Cat" from the "Baszta" Regiment. This unit consisted of about 80 soldiers (including nurses) and its armament was very modest – 3 machine guns, 20 rifles, 15 pistols, 130 grenades and 30 bottles with "Molotov cocktails".

Home Army soldiers managed to enter the prison and occupy the administrative building, but it proved impossible to reach the penitentiary buildings. During the battle lieutenant "Cat" suffered a serious wound. The German crew, reinforced from the nearby SS barracks, stopped the attack, disarmed and captured Polish guards. According to a report by the deputy head of the prison Kirchner, the attack cost the Germans 9 killed and 17 wounded.

Despite the shelling from tank guns, the insurgents kept the captured administrative building until dawn of August 2. During the day, however, they were forced to retreat. The Germans murdered the wounded and captured soldiers of the Home Army.

== Massacre ==
On August 2, Kirchner was appointed Acting Head of the Mokotow Prison. At 11.00 a.m. he was called to the nearby SS barracks. There, SS-Obersturmführer Martin Patz, the commander of subunit of the 3rd SS Battalion of Armored Grenadiers (SS-Pz. Gren. Ausb.- und Ers. Btl. 3), declared to him that General Reiner Stahel, the commander of the Warsaw garrison, ordered the extermination of the prisoners. This decision was also confirmed by the SS and Police commander for the Warsaw district, SS-Oberführer Paul Otto Geibel, who additionally ordered the execution of Polish guards. Kirchner drew up a takeover report, on the basis of which he placed at Patz's disposal all the prisoners in the prison.

The SS soldiers entered the prison in the afternoon. They wrote down the exact status of all the cells, and then from the two investigative wards on the ground floor they took out about 60 men, who were ordered to dig three ditches, about 25-30 meters long, and about 2 meters wide and deep[4][10]. The first ditch was dug along the walls of pavilion X on the laundry side, the second one in the walking square on the side of Niepodległości Avenue, and the third one in the walking square on the side of Kazimierzowska Street. German soldiers were drinking vodka during the digging. After the work was finished, all the diggers were shot.

The Germans then proceeded to eliminate the remaining prisoners. The pensioners were taken out of their cells, led over excavated pits and murdered with a shot in the back of their heads. The first to be executed were prisoners from wards 1 and 2 (the so-called investigative wards), among them several boys aged from 12 to 14. Then the patients of the Chamber of the Sick were murdered. Later, the SS began to empty wards: 8 (recidivists), 10 (prisoners with high sentences), 11, 3, and 5 one by one. The mass graves were quickly filled and the SS-men were forced to execute some prisoners outside the prison (on the other side of Rakowiecka Street). During the several-hour massacre, more than 600 residents of the Mokotów prison were murdered.

According to the testimony of Antoni Józef Porzygowski,

I heard that the SS was approaching my cell and then I hid under the bed [...] SS-man lifted up the bed, started kicking me with his legs and led me out [...] I was led one by one to the pit near the boiler room on the walking square from Niepodległości Avenue side. SS-man ordered me to turn my face down, shot and kicked down. The bullet passed behind my ear [I heard the swish] and I fell face to face with the corpses. I heard shots of executions and the killing of the injured when someone moved. At one point, unable to bear the burden of corpses, I decided to stand up and end my life. I was sure that the SS men would shoot me as soon as I got up. I looked up and saw that there was no one above me. It was difficult for me to get out of the corpses.

== Prisoners' revolt ==
The slaughter, which took place in the prison courtyard, was perfectly visible from the windows of the cells, and the Poles who watched it realized that they were condemned to death and had nothing to lose. Prisoners from wards 6 and 7 on the second floor decided to take a desperate step and attacked the perpetrators. In ward 6, prisoners broke the cell door or made holes in the walls using benches, and then they escaped to the corridor and set fire to the straw and mattresses, thus scaring off the Germans. In ward 7, the prisoners managed to kill several SS men and take away their weapons. Then the whole second floor was barricaded and the prisoners from the cells of ward no. 9 (minors) were released. Surprised Germans withdrew.

At night, under the cover of darkness and heavy rain, the prisoners began to move to the attic and then to the steep roof of the building. From there, they descended onto the wall surrounding the prison, where civilians came to their aid, carrying ladders. In this way, from 200 to 300 prisoners managed to escape and get to the area occupied by the insurgents. The Germans did not try to stop them, because they wrongly hoped that the prisoners would run away through the main gate.

The fate of detained Polish guards is unknown. Some witnesses testified that the guards were not murdered together with the prisoners and that many of them survived the war. Other witnesses, however, provided the opposite information.

== Epilogue ==
From April 16-21, 1945, exhumation works were carried out on the premises of the Mokotów prison. At that time, about 700 bodies from the period of the Warsaw Uprising were found, some of which were buried in the prison only after the prisoners had been murdered (usually the bodies of Poles imprisoned and murdered in a makeshift prison in Stauferkaserne barracks). The found bodies, with the exception of those taken care of by the families, were buried temporarily in eight mass graves in Niepodległości Avenue. In December 1945 all bodies were again exhumed and transferred to the Military Cemetery in Powazki, where they were buried in the insurgent quarters.

In 1978, the trial of SS-Obersturmführer Martin Patz, known as the "butcher of Mokotów", began before a Cologne court. He was judged for the crimes committed by his SS-men during the suppression of the Warsaw Uprising, including, above all, the murders of prisoners in the prison at Rakowiecka Street. In February 1980 Patz was convicted and sentenced to nine years in prison. Karl Misling, who was tried in the same trial, was sentenced to four years in prison.

== Bibliography ==
- Lesław M. Bartelski: Mokotów 1944. Warszawa: wydawnictwo MON, 1986. ISBN 83-11-07078-4.
- Władysław Bartoszewski: Warszawski pierścień śmierci 1939-1944. Warszawa: Interpress, 1970.
- Adam Borkiewicz: Powstanie warszawskie. Zarys działań natury wojskowej. Warszawa: Instytut wydawniczy PAX, 1969.
- Szymon Datner, Kazimierz Leszczyński (red.): Zbrodnie okupanta w czasie powstania warszawskiego w 1944 roku (w dokumentach). Warszawa: wydawnictwo MON, 1962.
- Regina Domańska: Pawiak – więzienie Gestapo. Kronika lat 1939-1944. Warszawa: Książka i Wiedza, 1978.
- Maja Motyl, Stanisław Rutkowski: Powstanie Warszawskie – rejestr miejsc i faktów zbrodni. Warszawa: GKBZpNP-IPN, 1994.
- Friedo Sachser. Central Europe. Federal Republic of Germany. Nazi Trials. „American Jewish Year Book". 82, 1982
- Ludność cywilna w powstaniu warszawskim. T. I. Cz. 2: Pamiętniki, relacje, zeznania. Warszawa: Państwowy Instytut Wydawniczy, 1974.
- Więzienie Mokotowskie. geotekst.pl. [dostęp 18 września 2009].
