= Massacre in the Jesuit monastery on Rakowiecka Street, Warsaw =

Nazi German war crime 1944

Coordinates: 52.2057°N 21.0002°E

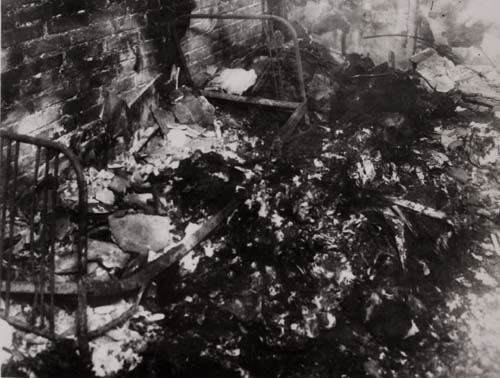
Place of the massacre photographed in 1945

The massacre in the Jesuit monastery on Rakowiecka Street in Warsaw was a Nazi German war crime perpetrated by members of the Waffen-SS on the second day (2 August) of the Warsaw Uprising, during the World War II. On 2 August 1944 about 40 Poles were murdered and their bodies burnt in the basement of the Jesuit monastery at 61 Rakowiecka Street in Warsaw. Among the victims were 16 priests and religious brothers of the Society of Jesus.

== Prelude ==
In December 1935 a Jesuit monastery (Dom Pisarzy, literally: "The House of Scribes") was established at 61 Rakowiecka Street in Warsaw's district of Mokotów. Soon after the Nazi occupation of Poland began, this part of Mokotów became part of the so-called German district in Warsaw. Many of the surrounding buildings were converted into a barracks for various German military or police units.

On 1 August 1944, the Polish Home Army began an uprising against Nazis in Warsaw. Polish insurgents attacked a number of German-held buildings on Rakowiecka Street and in its surroundings, but they were repelled by the better equipped and more numerous Wehrmacht and SS troops. The monastery and its inhabitants suffered no harm on that day. Over a dozen Polish civilians, surprised by the outbreak of the uprising away from their homes, took refuge on its premises.

== Massacre ==
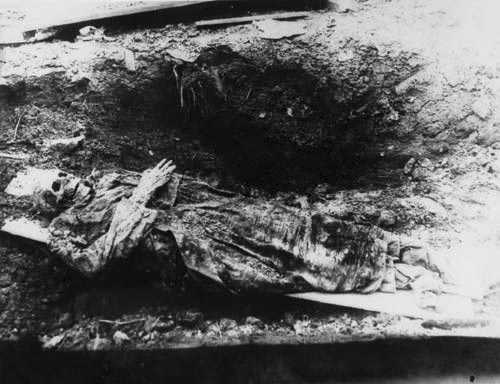
Dead body of the Father Superior, Fr Edward Kosibowicz, exhumed in 1945

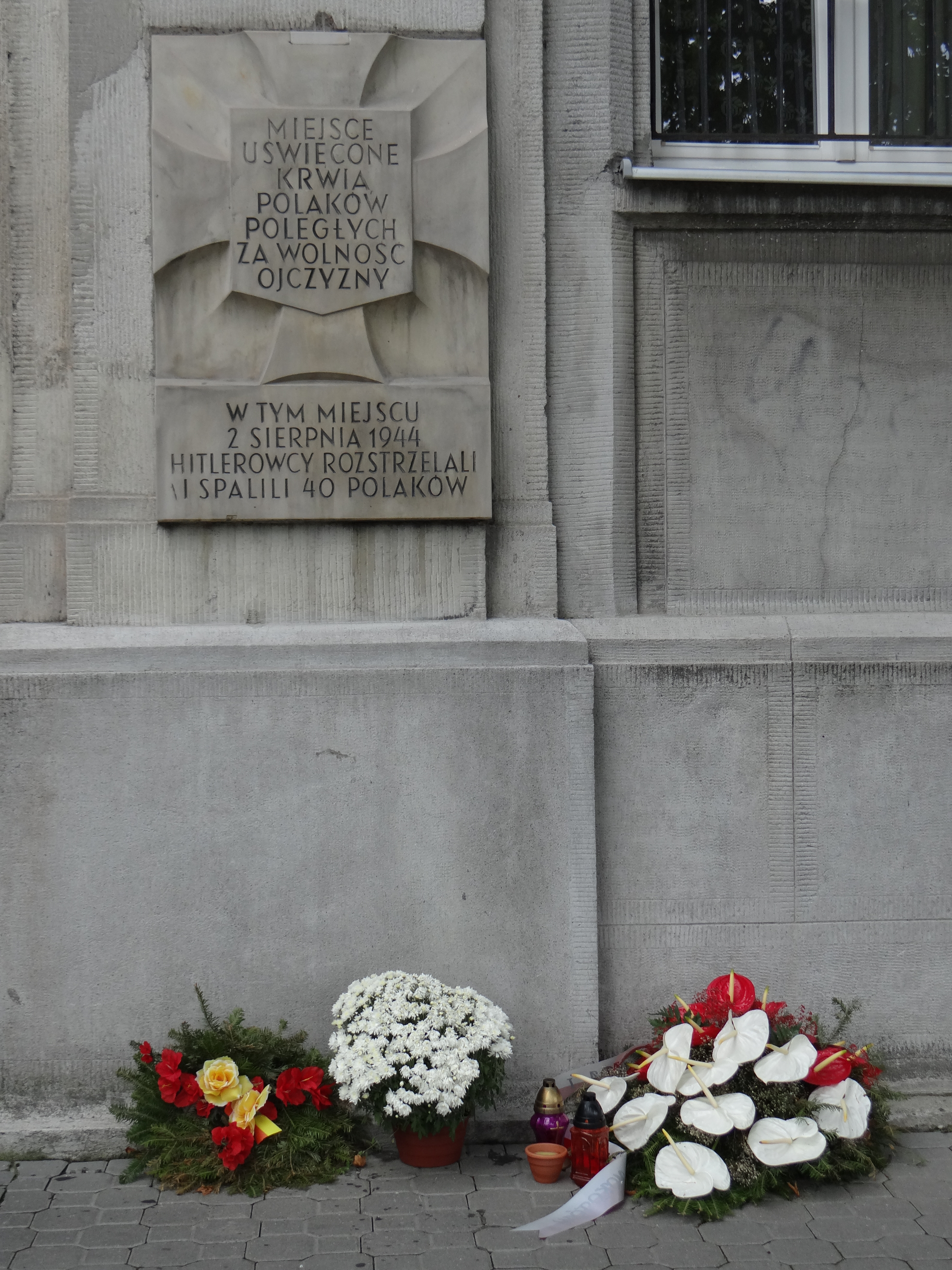
Tchorek plaque on the wall of monastery

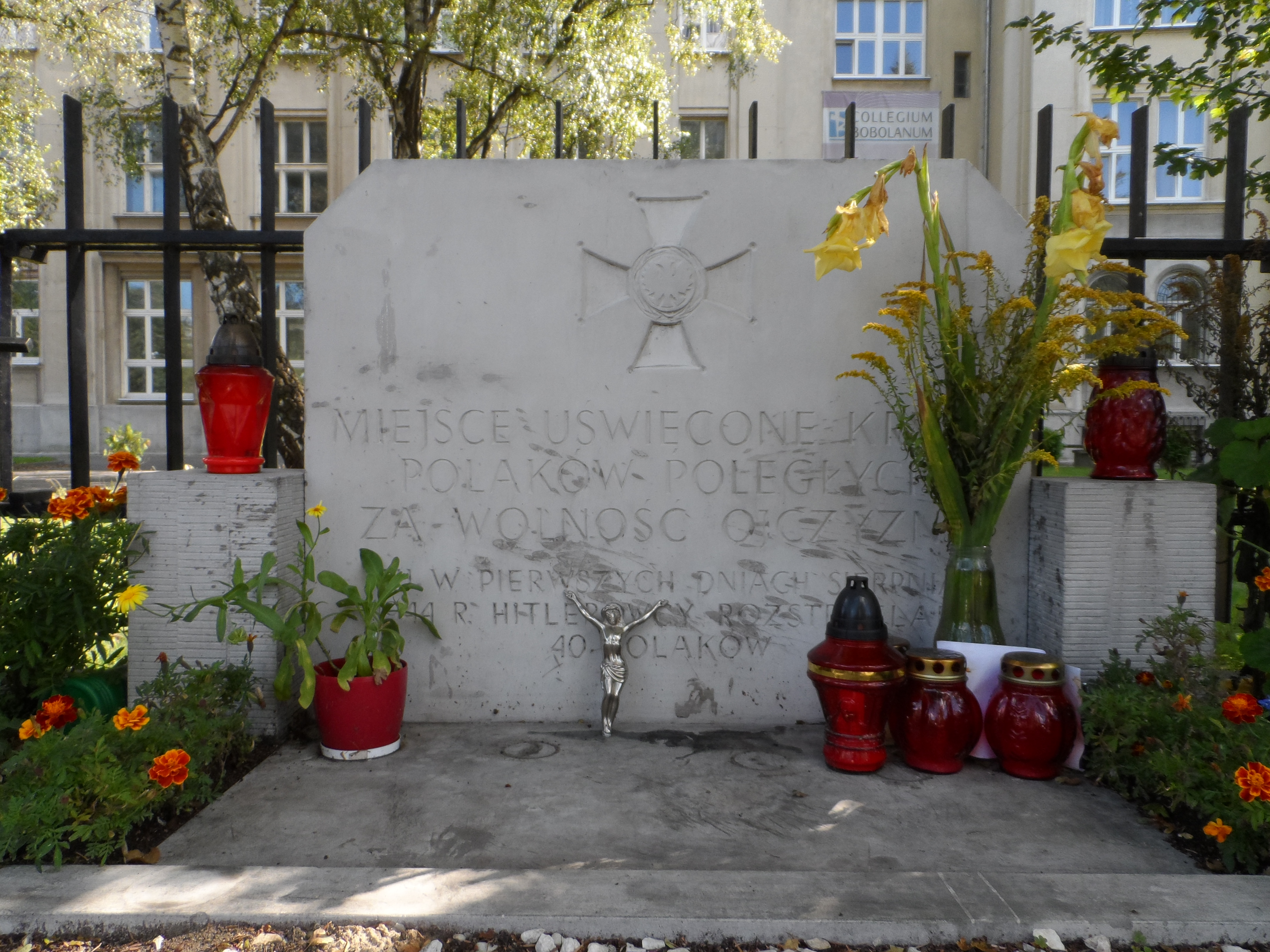
Commemorative plaque on Rakowiecka Street

In the morning of 2 August the monastery came under fire of German light anti-aircraft guns from nearby Mokotów Field. Nobody was injured but a few moments later about 20 Waffen-SS soldiers, led by non-commissioned officer, burst into building. (Note: SS men were probably sent from nearby Waffen-SS barracks on 4 Rakowiecka Street (Stauferkaserne). The barracks housed forces of the SS-Panzergrenadier-Ausbildungs und Ersatz-Bataillon 3, led by Obersturmführer Martin Patz. This unit was responsible for many atrocities, committed at Mokotów during the Warsaw Uprising. See: Datner and Leszczyński (1962), p. 127.) They claimed that gunshots were fired from the monastery's windows. At that time, about 50 Poles were present in the building – including 25 priests and religious brothers, 12 non-clergy employees as well as over a dozen refugees. Among them was 10-year-old altar boy, Zbyszek Mikołajczyk.

SS soldiers conducted a quick search but were unable to find anything confirming the allegations. Shortly afterwards, some of them left the monastery, taking with them Father Superior, Fr Edward Kosibowicz. They claimed that father superior need to make additional explanations to their commander. In fact, Fr Kosibowicz was taken to the nearby Mokotów Field and there he was shot in the back of the head. In the meantime, those priests who spoke German tried to calm down the atmosphere, by starting conversation with the remaining soldiers, but without success.

After a while, SS men gathered all Poles in the monastery's boiler room. Next, they were called one by one by the soldiers, robbed of all precious belongings (jewellery, watches etc.) and finally led to the small room in the basement, which was previously occupied by a coachman employed in the monastery. When all Poles were gathered in the coachman's room, SS soldiers hurled grenades into the crowd and opened fire with machine pistols. In next few hours, soldiers repeatedly came back to the place of massacre and systematically executed those Poles who still gave some signs of life. According to the survivors, SS men were accompanied with a 10-year-old German boy who help them to find wounded victims.

His voice reverberated throughout the room from time to time: "Achtung! Der lebt noch! O hier, hier, er atmet noch!" The impression was horrible because next what was heard, was a sound of machine pistol fire series, accompanied with child's laugh and clapping.

When soldiers temporarily left the basement, 14 survivors, mostly wounded and pretending to be dead among a pile of bodies, left the room. Four Jesuits and one unidentified woman hid in the monastery's kitchen (behind the stack of firewood), while the others found shelter in the monastery's boiler room when they also met a man who had hid there prior to the massacre. Shortly afterwards SS soldiers returned to the place of massacre, doused the bodies with gasoline and set them on fire. Probably a few severely wounded victims were burnt alive. The SS men also completely plundered the monastery and set fire in many of its rooms.

The last victim of the massacre was Fr Franciszek Szymaniak (Jesuit, military chaplain). Unaware of what happened, he returned to Rakowiecka Street to take the consecrated host, and he was shot dead in the monastery's chapel.

Around 40 Poles were murdered in the Jesuit monastery on Rakowiecka Street on 2 August 1944. Among them were eight priests and eight religious brothers of the Society of Jesus, (Note: Including Fr Edward Kosibowicz and Fr Franciszek Szymaniak.) at least eight women and a 10-year-old altar boy. Polish historians were able to identify 32 victims of the massacre.

Retired colonel Zołoteńko told me, that after the execution in the monastery he asked one German soldier what happened with the priests, especially with the father superior. Soldier answered in German: "They are all dead. I will do the same with every other priest"

— testimony of fr. Aleksander Kisiel.

== Fate of survivors ==
On the night of 2–3 August, five survivors who were hiding in the kitchen escaped the monastery. Four Jesuits left Warsaw and found shelter outside the city. The woman who initially accompanied them returned to the Motoków to find the children she left in her flat before the uprising began (according to Friar Jan Rosiak, she survived the war).

After two days Poles who had hid in the boiler room established a contact with inhabitants of nearby tenement house. On 5 August Polish military nurses sent from Home Army's hospital secretly evacuated all of them.

== Aftermath ==
In the first days of the Warsaw Uprising Germans transformed nearby Stauferkaserne barracks at 4 Rakowiecka Street into provisional prison. Polish prisoners (usually civilians captured in the Mokotów) were used as forced labor. Among the prisoners was one Jesuit, fr. Bruno Pawelczyk. He lived in the monastery on Rakowiecka Street but the outbreak of the uprising surprised him in other part of city. Shortly afterwards he was detained by Germans and imprisonment in the Stauferkaserne, where he joined a kommando responsible for disposal of bodies covering Mokotów streets. When his team reached the ransacked monastery, fr. Pawelczyk was able to convince his fellow prisoners that it will be easier to wall up the room full with the bodies, than move the bodies and bury them somewhere else. It made possible to identify many massacre victims after the war.

After the war, remnants of the victims were put in four coffins and buried under the floor of the same room in the monastery's basement, where massacre took place. Father superior Edward Kosibowicz, and fr. Leonard Hrynaszkiewicz – Jesuit priest who was killed during the uprising at Warsaw New Town – were also buried in the same place (but in separate coffins). The room was transformed into a chapel.

In the 1950s victims of the massacre were commemorated with two commemorative plaques. One of them, designed by sculptor Karol Tchorek, is displayed on the wall of monastery (facing Andrzej Bobola Street). Second is a free-standing one located near the church's fence on Rakowiecka Street.

Fr. Władysław Wiącek, one of the Jesuits murdered on 2 August 1944, has been accorded the title of Servant of God. He is currently one of the 122 Polish martyrs of the Second World War who are included in the beatification process initiated in 1994, whose first beatification session was held in Warsaw on 17 September 2003.

== See also ==
- Jesuits and Nazi Germany

== Bibliography ==
- Adam Borkiewicz (1969). Powstanie warszawskie. Zarys działań natury wojskowej. Warszawa: Instytut wydawniczy PAX.
- Stanisław Ciepłowski (1987). Napisy pamiątkowe w Warszawie XVIII–XX w. Warszawa: Państwowe Wydawnictwo Naukowe. ISBN 83-01-06109-X.
- Szymon Datner; Kazimierz Leszczyński (1962). Zbrodnie okupanta w czasie powstania warszawskiego w 1944 roku (w dokumentach). Warszawa: Wydawnictwo MON.
- Norman Davies (2006). Powstanie '44. Kraków: Wydawnictwo Znak. ISBN 978-83-240-1386-9.
- Maja Motyl; Stanisław Rutkowski (1994). Powstanie Warszawskie – rejestr miejsc i faktów zbrodni. Warszawa: GKBZpNP-IPN.
- Felicjan Paluszkiewicz (2003). Masakra w klasztorze. Warszawa: Wydawnictwo Rhetos. ISBN 83-917849-1-6.
