= Augustin Rösch =

German resistance member (1893–1961)

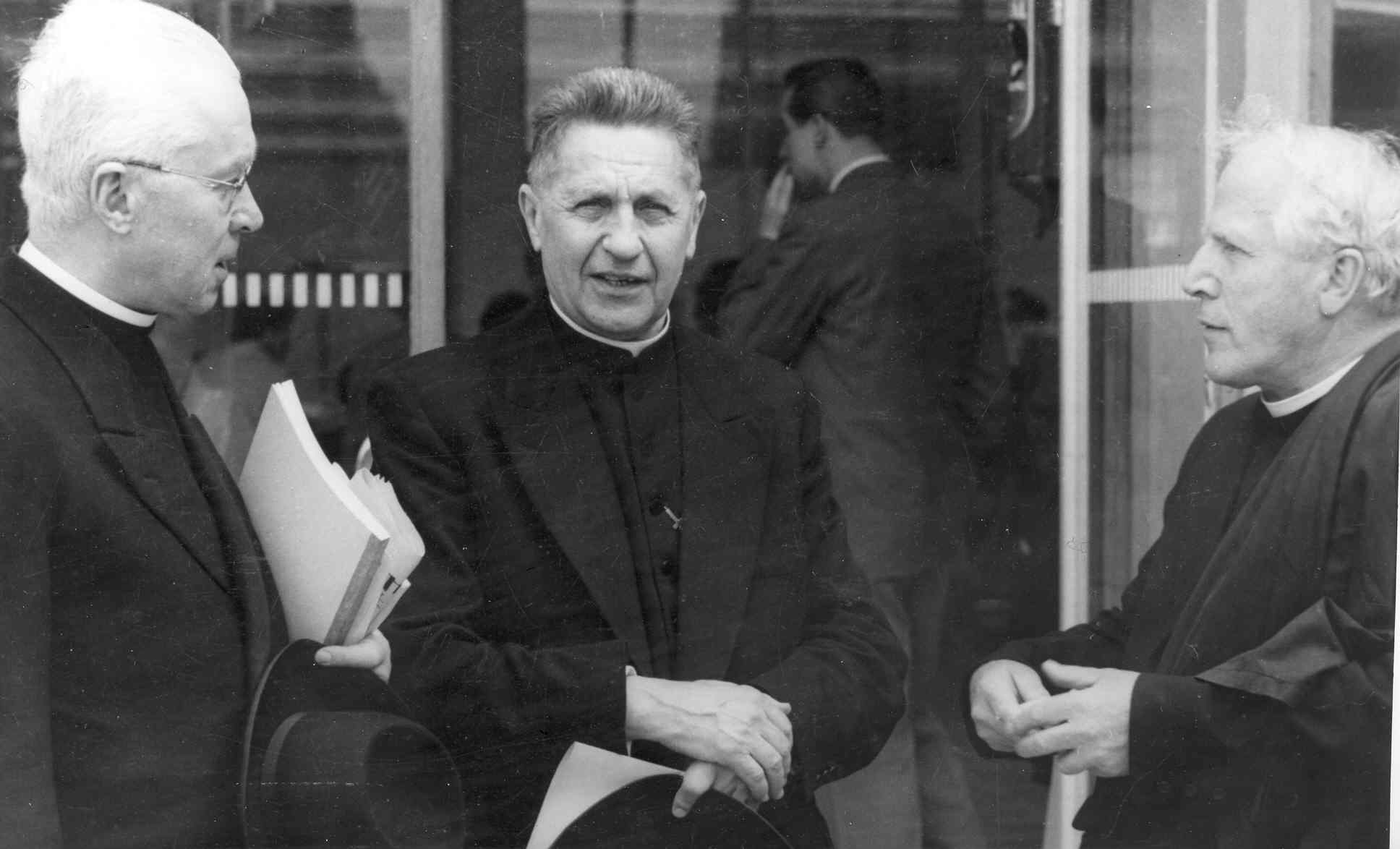
Caritas director Augustin Rösch (right) with Provincial Otto Faller (left) and the director of Caritas Internationalis Eggert (centre)

Augustin Rösch (11 May 1893 – 7 November 1961) was a German Jesuit, Provincial, and significant figure in Catholic resistance to Nazism. Active in the Kreisau Circle German Resistance group, he was arrested in connection with the 1944 July Plot to overthrow Hitler, but survived his imprisonment.

== Life ==
Rösch was born in Schwandorf and entered the Jesuit order at the age of 18. During World War I, he was drafted into the army and fought at Verdun. He was ordained as a priest in 1925. Together with Otto Faller, he headed the Stella Matutina (Jesuit School) in various leadership positions from 1925 until 1935. In 1935 he was named Jesuit Provincial, a post which he occupied to the end of "the Third Reich" in 1945. He appointed Alfred Delp to be his representative at the resistance meetings.

After the failed coup against Hitler, he went into hiding in a farm. He was found, arrested, tortured and brought to the Dachau concentration camp. Sent to interrogation to Berlin, he was freed in light of the advancing Red Army of the Soviet Union. After the war until his death, he was heading the Bavarian Caritas Internationalis from 1947 to 1961.

== See also ==
- Jesuits and Nazi Germany

== Sources ==
- Augustin Rösch, Roman Bleistein (Hg.): Kampf gegen den Nationalsozialismus, 1985, ISBN 3-7820-0516-3
- Hans Niedermayer: Augustin Rösch: ein Mann des Widerstands im Dritten Reich. Jahresbericht Dom-Gymnasium, Freising, 1994/95, S. 8-24
- Roman Bleistein: Augustin Rösch. Leben im Widerstand. Biographie und Dokumente. Frankfurt a. Main 1998, in: Theologische Literaturzeitung, Ausgabe 125, 2000 S. 182-184, ISBN 3-7820-0794-8
