= Jesuits and Nazi Germany =

Society of Jesus in World War II Germany

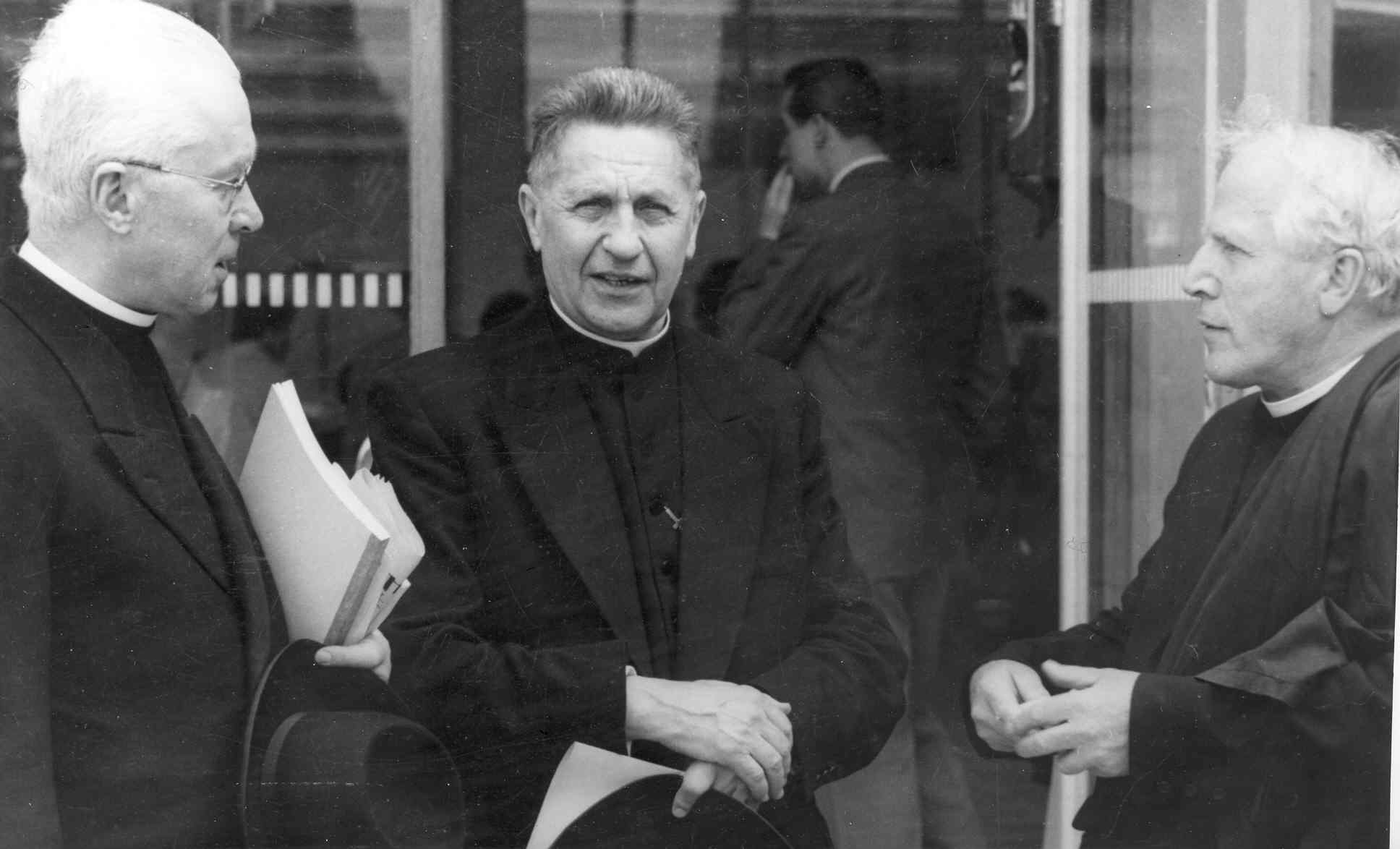
Augustin Rösch (centre) was the wartime Jesuit Provincial of Bavaria and one of three Jesuits in the inner Kreisau Circle of the German Resistance. He ended the war on death row.

At the outbreak of World War II, the Society of Jesus (Jesuits) had 1700 members in Nazi Germany, divided into three provinces: Eastern, Lower and Upper Germany. Nazi leaders had some admiration for the discipline of the Jesuit order, but opposed its principles. Of the 152 Jesuits murdered by the Nazis across Europe, 27 died in captivity or its results, and 43 in the concentration camps.

Hitler was anticlerical and had particular disdain for the Jesuits. The Jesuit Provincial, Augustin Rosch, ended the war on death row for his role in the July Plot to overthrow Hitler. The Catholic Church faced persecution in Nazi Germany and persecution was particularly severe in Poland. The Superior General of the Jesuits at the outbreak of War was Wlodzimierz Ledochowski, a Pole. Vatican Radio, which spoke out against Axis atrocities, was run by the Jesuit Filippo Soccorsi.

Jesuits made up the largest contingent of clergy imprisoned in the Priest Barracks of Dachau Concentration Camp, where some 30 Jesuits died. Several Jesuits were prominent in the small German Resistance, including the influential martyr Alfred Delp of the Kreisau Circle. The German Jesuit Robert Leiber acted as intermediary between Pius XII and the German Resistance. Among the Jesuit victims of the Nazis, Germany's Rupert Mayer has been beatified. Among twelve Jesuit "Righteous Gentiles" recognised by Yad Vashem is Belgium's Jean-Baptiste Janssens, who was appointed Superior General of the Jesuits after the War.

== Nazi attitudes to the Jesuits ==
Heinrich Himmler was impressed by the Order's organisational structure. Hitler wrote favourably of their influence on architecture and on himself in Mein Kampf. But Nazi ideology could not accept an autonomous establishment whose legitimacy did not spring from the government and it desired the subordination of the church to the State. According to historians Kershaw, Bullock, Evans, Fest, Phayer, Shirer and others, Hitler eventually hoped to eradicate Christianity in Germany.

Hitler biographer Alan Bullock wrote that though Hitler was raised as a Catholic, and retained some regard for the organisational power of Catholicism, he had utter contempt for its central teachings which he said, if taken to their conclusion, "would mean the systematic cultivation of the human failure." Richard J. Evans wrote that Hitler believed that in the long run National Socialism and religion would not be able to co-exist, and stressed repeatedly that Nazism was a secular ideology, founded on modern science: "Science, he declared, would easily destroy the last remaining vestiges of superstition." Germany could not tolerate the intervention of foreign influences such as the Pope, and "priests, he said, were 'black bugs', 'abortions in black cassocks.'"

Although the broader membership of the Nazi Party after 1933 came to include many Catholics, aggressive anti-Church radicals like Goebbels, Martin Bormann, and Himmler saw the kirchenkampf campaign against the Churches as a priority concern, and anti-church and anticlerical sentiments were strong among grassroots party activists.

The Minister for Propaganda Joseph Goebbels wrote that on the "Church Question... after the war it has to be generally solved.... There is, namely, an insoluble opposition between the Christian and a heroic-German world view." Hitler's chosen deputy and private secretary from 1941, Martin Bormann, said publicly in 1941 that "National Socialism and Christianity are irreconcilable." In 1937, Himmler wrote: "We live in an era of the ultimate conflict with Christianity. It is part of the mission of the SS to give the German people in the next half century the non-Christian ideological foundations on which to lead and shape their lives."

== Jesuit attitudes to the Nazis ==
An early photo of the Polish Jesuit Wlodzimierz Ledochowski, who was serving as the Superior General of the Jesuits at the outbreak of World War II.

According to the Jesuit historian Lapomarda, the Jesuits "resisted the evil policies of the Third Reich, and, as a consequence, suffered very much for such opposition to the Nazis in Europe." Jesuit journalists were critical of the Nazi takeover in Stimmen der Zeit, and the Nazis had the journal closed. Jesuits Jakob Notges and Anton Koch wrote firmly against the anti-Christian sentiments of the official Nazi philosopher Alfred Rosenberg.

According to Lapomarda, there was "no doubt" about the Jesuit Superior General Ledochowski's concern to thwart the Germans in Europe once they had invaded Poland, "Even if he had at one time entertained, as alleged by one historian, the conception of a union of a Catholic bloc in Europe against the Communists in the East and the Protestants in the West, events had dramatically altered that vision." Wlodimir Ledóchowski accurately surmised Hitler's perfidious nature, and predicted the Hitler-Stalin Pact, and he used the Jesuit-run Vatican Radio service to broadcast condemnations of Nazi crimes in Poland, that led to German Government protests and assisted underground resistance movements in occupied Europe.

== Nazi persecution of the Jesuits ==
The Nazis disliked the Catholic and Protestant churches. Prosecutors at the Nuremberg Trials submitted that Hitler and his inner circle engaged in a criminal conspiracy and slow and cautious policy to eliminate Christianity. The Church suffered Persecution in Nazi Germany and some 152 Jesuits were killed under the reign of the Nazis – 27 died in captivity (or its results) and 43 died in the concentration camps.

Jesuit journals were raided, closed and suspended. The Nazis cracked down on Jesuit schools, which were gradually closed under Nazi pressure.

The Jesuit-educated Bishop Clemens August von Galen's famous 1941 denunciations of Nazi euthanasia were partly motivated by the seizure of Jesuit properties by the Gestapo in his home city of Münster.

=== Priest barracks of Dachau ===
In Dachau: The Official History 1933–1945, Paul Berben wrote that under the reign of the Nazis, clergy were watched closely, and frequently denounced, arrested and sent to concentration camps. The Priest Barracks of Dachau Concentration Camp (Pfarrerblock, Priesterblock) incarcerated clergy who had opposed the Nazi regime of Adolf Hitler.

Of a total of 2,720 clergy recorded as imprisoned at Dachau, the overwhelming majority, some 2,579 (or 95%) were Catholic. Berben noted that R. Schnabel's 1966 investigation Die Frommen in der Hölle found an alternative total of 2,771 and included the fate all the clergy listed, with 692 noted as deceased and 336 sent out on "invalid trainloads" and therefore presumed dead. Members of the Jesuit order were the largest group among the incarcerated clergy at Dachau. Around 400 German priests were sent to Dachau, though Polish priests made up the greatest contingent. Lapomarda lists some 30 Jesuits as having died at Dachau (of a total of 43 Jesuits who died in the concentration camps). Among the Jesuits to survive Dachau was Adam Kozłowiecki (who later served as a Cardinal).

== Jesuits and the Resistance ==
=== Rupert Mayer ===
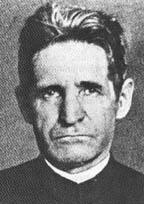
The Blessed Rupert Mayer SJ was sent to Sachsenhausen concentration camp in 1939.

The Blessed Rupert Mayer, a Bavarian Jesuit and World War I army chaplain, had clashed with the National Socialists as early as 1923. Continuing his critique following Hitler's rise to power, Mayer was imprisoned in 1939 and sent to Sachsenhausen concentration camp. As his health declined, the Nazis feared the creation of a martyr and sent him to Ettal Abbey, but Meyer died in 1945.

=== The Vatican ===
With Poland overrun in 1939 but France and the Low Countries yet to be attacked, the small German Resistance wanted the Pope's assistance in preparations for a coup to oust Hitler. The Pope's Private Secretary, the German Jesuit Fr. Robert Leiber, acted as the intermediary between Pius XII and the German Resistance. He met with Abwehr officer Josef Müller, who visited Rome in 1939 and 1940.

The Vatican agreed to offer the machinery for mediation between the German military resistance and the Allies. On May 3, Müller told Fr Leiber that invasion of the Netherlands and Belgium was imminent. The Vatican advised the Netherlands envoy to the Vatican that the Germans planned to invade France through the Netherlands and Belgium on May 10. The Vatican also sent a coded radio message to its nuncios in Brussels and The Hague.

Alfred Jodl noted in his diary that the Germans knew the Belgian envoy to the Vatican had been tipped off, and the Führer was greatly agitated by the danger of treachery. The German invasion of the Low Countries followed on May 10 and Belgium, the Netherlands and Luxembourg were quickly overwhelmed. In 1943, Müller was arrested. Müller spent the rest of the war in concentration camps, ending up at Dachau. Lieber was under the surveillance of the Gestapo. Hans Bernd Gisevius was sent in place of Müller to advise of the developments and met with Leiber.

=== The Kreisau Circle ===
Religious motivations were particularly strong in the Kreisau Circle of the Resistance. Formed in 1937, though multi-denominational it had a strongly Christian orientation. Its outlook was rooted both in German romantic and idealist tradition and in the Catholic doctrine of natural law. The Circle pressed for a coup against Hitler, but being unarmed was dependent on persuading military figures to take action.

Among the central membership of the Circle were the Jesuit Fathers Augustin Rösch, Alfred Delp and Lothar König. Bishop von Preysing had contact with the group. The Catholic conservative Karl Ludwig von Guttenberg brought the Jesuit Provincial of Southern Germany Augustin Rösch into the Kreisau Circle, along with Alfred Delp. For figures like Rösch, the Catholic trade unionists Jakob Kaiser and Bernhard Letterhaus, and the July Plot leader Klaus von Stauffenberg, "religious motives and the determination to resist would seem to have developed hand in hand."

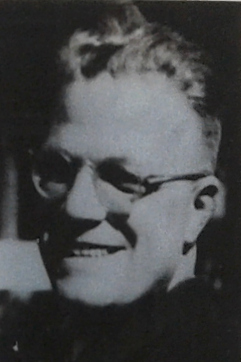
The Jesuit Alfred Delp was an influential member of the Kreisau Circle – one of the few clandestine German Resistance groups operating inside Nazi Germany. He was executed in February 1945.

According to Gill, "Delp's role was to sound out for [the group's leader] Moltke the possibilities in the Catholic community of support for a new, post-war Germany." Rösch and Delp also explored the possibilities for common ground between Christian and socialist trade unions. Lothar König, S.J., became an important intermediary between the Circle and bishops Gröber of Freiburg and Preysing of Berlin.

The Kreisau group combined conservative notions of reform with socialist strains of thought – a symbiosis expressed by Alfred Delp's notion of "personal socialism". The group rejected Western models, but wanted to "associate conservative and socialist values, aristocracy and workers, in a new democratic synthesis which would include the churches. Delp wrote: "It is time the 20th Century revolution was given a definitive theme, and the opportunity to create new and lasting horizons for humanity" by which he meant, social security and the basics for individual intellectual and religious development. So long as people lacked dignity, they would be incapable of prayer or thought. In Die dritte Idee (lit. 'the third idea'), Delp expounded on the notion of a third way, which, as opposed to Communism and capitalism, might restore the unity of the person and society.

=== The Solf Circle ===
Another non-military German Resistance group, dubbed the "Frau Solf Tea Party" by the Gestapo, included the Jesuit Fr Friedrich Erxleben. The purpose of the Solf Circle was to seek out humanitarian ways of countering the Nazi regime. It met at either Frau Solf or Elizabeth von Thadden's home. Von Thadden was a Christian educational reformer and Red Cross worker. Otto Kiep and most of the group were arrested in 1941 and executed.

== The Holocaust ==
In his history of the heroes of the Holocaust, the Jewish historian Martin Gilbert notes that priests and nuns of orders like the Jesuits, Franciscans and Benedictines hid Jewish children in monasteries, convents and schools to protect them from the Nazis. Historically, Jesuits had at times used their influence against the Jews in Catholic countries, and, according to Lapomarda, from the 16th century Jewish people and Jesuits had often found themselves in opposition. In the 1930s, the Jesuits still had a rule banning people of Jewish ancestry from joining the Jesuits.

Fourteen Jesuit priests have been formally recognized by Yad Vashem, the Holocaust Martyrs' and Heroes' Remembrance Authority in Jerusalem, for risking their lives to save Jews during the Holocaust of World War II. These are: Roger Braun (1910–1981) of France; Pierre Chaillet (1900–1972) of France; Jean-Baptist De Coster (1896–1968) of Belgium; Jean Fleury (1905–1982) of France; Emile Gessler (1891–1958) of Belgium; Jean-Baptiste Janssens (1889–1964) of Belgium; Alphonse Lambrette (1884–1970) of Belgium; Planckaert Emile (1906–2006) of France; hu:Raile Jakab (1894–1949) of Hungary; Henri Revol (1904–1992) of France; pl:Adam Sztark (1907–1942) of Poland; Henri Van Oostayen (1906–1945) of Belgium; Ioannes Marangos (1901–1989) of Greece; and Raffaele de Chantuz Cube (1904–1983) of Italy. For more information on these Jesuits and others who were involved in helping Jews, see Vincent A. Lapomarda, 100 Heroic Jesuits of the Second World War (2015).

With the Third Reich close to its full extent in late 1942, the Nazis sought to extend their roundups of Jews. In Lyon, in Vichy France, Cardinal Gerlier had defiantly refused to hand over Jewish children being sheltered in Catholic homes, and on September 9 it was reported in London that Vichy French authorities had ordered the arrest of all Catholic priests sheltering Jews in the unoccupied zone. Eight Jesuits were arrested for sheltering hundreds of children on Jesuit properties.

Two thirds of the 300,000 Jews living in France at the outbreak of war survived the Nazi Holocaust. The majority of French Jews survived the occupation, in large part thanks to the help received from Catholics and Protestants, who protected them in convents, boarding schools, presbyteries and families. The Amitiés Chrétiennes organisation operated out of Lyon to secure hiding places for Jewish children. Among its members was the Jesuit Pierre Chaillet. The influential French Jesuit theologian Henri de Lubac was active in the resistance to Nazism and to antisemitism. He along with Pierre Chaillet assisted in the publication of Témoinage chrétien. He responded to Neo-paganism and antisemitism with clarity, describing the notion of an Aryan New Testament standing in contradiction to a Semitic Old Testament as "blasphemy" and "stupidity."

Dislike of Germans and Nazism was strong in Catholic Belgium. The Belgian Superior General of the Jesuits, Jean-Baptiste Janssens, was later honoured as Righteous among the Nations by Yad Vashem. The Nazis occupied Hungary in 1944, and commenced wide-scale deportations of Jews. Jesuit superior Jakab Raile is credited with saving around 150 Jewish people in the Jesuit residence in Budapest. In Lithuania, priests were active in the rescue of Jews, among them the Jesuit Bronius Paukstis.

== The Nazi Empire ==
=== Poland ===
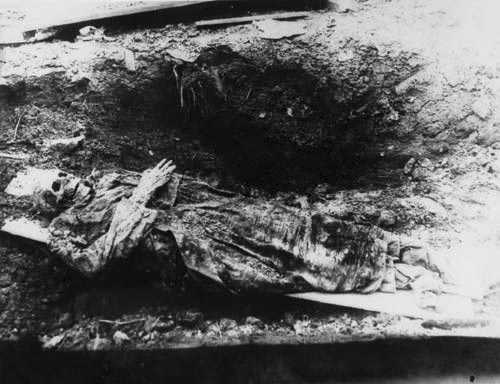
Exhumed body of Fr Edward Kosibowicz SJ, Father Superior at the site of the Massacre in the Jesuit monastery on Rakowiecka Street in Warsaw (1944).

The Superior General of the worldwide Jesuit order at the outbreak of war was Wlodzimierz Ledochowski, a Pole. The Nazi persecution of the Catholic Church in Poland was particularly severe. Vincent Lapomarda wrote that Ledochowski helped "stiffen the general attitude of the Jesuits against the Nazis" and that he permitted Vatican Radio to carry on its campaign against the Nazis in Poland. Vatican Radio was run by the Jesuit Filippo Soccorsi and spoke out against Nazi oppression – particularly with regard to Poland and to Vichy-French antisemitism.

Hitler's plans for the Germanization of the East saw no place for the Christian churches. Nazi policy towards the Church was at its most severe in the territories it annexed to Greater Germany, where the Nazis set about systematically dismantling the Church – arresting its leaders, exiling its clergymen, closing its churches, monasteries and convents. Many clergymen were murdered.

Jesuit-run Vatican Radio reported in November 1940 that religious life for Catholics in Poland had been brutally restricted and that at least 400 clergy had been deported to Germany in the preceding four months. Among the Nazi crimes against Catholics in Poland was the massacre in the Jesuit residence on Rakowiecka Street in Warsaw (1944).

Among the most significant Polish Jesuits to survive the Priest Barracks of Dachau Concentration Camp was Adam Kozłowiecki, who later served as a Cardinal. He was arrested as a young priest at the Jesuit College in Kraków in 1939, and remained imprisoned until April 1945. He later wrote his recollections of his time at Dachau, where the highest percentage among incarcerated clergy were Jesuits.

== See also ==
- Catholic Church and Nazi Germany
- Catholic resistance to Nazism
- Massacre in the Jesuit monastery on Rakowiecka Street in Warsaw (1944)

== Sources ==
- Lapomarda, Vincent A. (2005). The Jesuits and the Third Reich (2nd ed.). Lewiston, New York: Edwin Mellen Press.
- Shirer, William Lawrence (1960). The Rise and Fall of the Third Reich: A History of Nazi Germany. London: Secker & Warburg. Wikidata Q138049061.
