= Paul Otto Geibel =

SS and Police Leader and SS-Brigadeführer

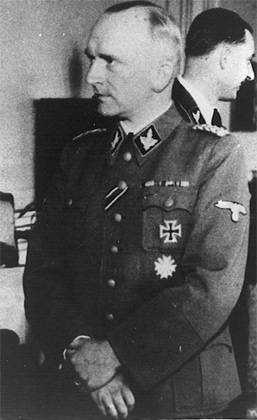
- Geibel in 1944
- Born: 10 June 1898; Dortmund, Province of Westphalia, Kingdom of Prussia, German Empire
- Died: 12 November 1966 (aged 68); Mokotów Prison, Warsaw, Polish People's Republic
- Military career
- Allegiance: German Empire; Nazi Germany
- Branch: Imperial German Navy; Schutzstaffel
- Service years: 1914–1918; 1938–1945
- Rank: SS-Brigadeführer and Generalmajor of Police
- Commands: SS and Police Leader, "Warsaw"
- Conflicts: World War I World War II
- Awards: Iron Cross, 1st and 2nd class War Merit Cross, 1st and 2nd class with Swords

Paul Otto Geibel (10 June 1898 – 12 November 1966) was a German SS-Brigadeführer and Generalmajor of police who served as the last SS and Police Leader (SSPF) "Warsaw" during the Second World War. He was involved in suppressing the Warsaw Uprising and in the subsequent destruction of the city. At the end of the war, he was convicted of war crimes and committed suicide while serving a life sentence in Poland.

== Early life ==
Geibel was born in Dortmund, the son of a school director. On the outbreak of the First World War, he left school and joined the Imperial German Navy. He served at sea and in the coastal artillery, finishing his service aboard the battlecruiser SMS Hindenburg, and rising to the rank of Leutnant zur see. After the war, he returned to civilian life and worked as an insurance salesman from 1920 to 1933. He joined the Nazi Party (membership number 761,353) and its paramilitary wing, the SA, in December 1931. He was commissioned an SA-Sturmführer in December 1933.

== Peacetime police career ==
From the end of 1933 until March 1935, Geibel worked in the Berlin headquarters of the SA police corps, eventually rising in rank to an SA-Sturmbannführer. In April 1935, he joined the Gendarmerie, or rural police force, a branch of the Ordnungspolizei (Order Police) reporting to the Ministry of the Interior. From April 1935 to October 1942, he was assigned to the Interior Ministry, administering the force's motorized components with the rank of Major. In addition, he was admitted to the SS (SS number 313,910) in December 1938 as an SS-Sturmbannführer. From October 1942 to the end of March 1944, he headed "Group Command Office II" in the Hauptamt (Main Office) of the Ordnungspolizei.

== Second World War ==
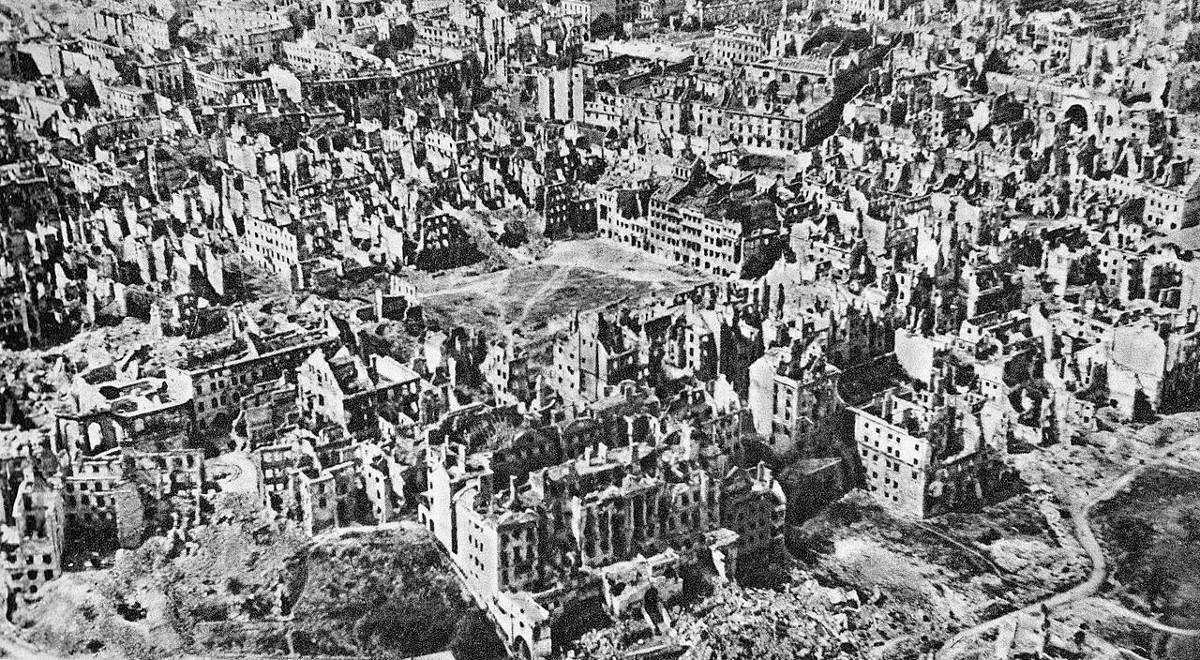
Photograph of Warsaw's Old Town Market Place, January 1945. It is estimated that German forces under Geibel destroyed 85-90% of the city.

On 31 March 1944, Geibel was transferred to the General Government and named the SS and Police Leader (SSPF) in Warsaw, as the permanent replacement to SS-Brigadeführer Franz Kutschera who had been assassinated on 1 February. Geibel would be the last person to hold this position. On 1 August 1944, the Warsaw Uprising was launched by the Polish Home Army. As the commander of all the SS and police forces in the city, Geibel was one of the chief participants in the suppression of the uprising, and was involved in the massacre in the Mokotów prison that resulted in the murder of approximately 600 inmates. Following the defeat of the Polish forces, Geibel played a key role in the retaliatory destruction of Warsaw ordered by Reichsführer-SS Heinrich Himmler. On 12 October 1944, Himmler appointed Geibel to oversee the operation. He was granted full powers to expel the population and to obliterate the Polish capital, which was largely razed to the ground. Geibel was promoted to his final rank of SS-Brigadeführer and Generalmajor of police on 26 October 1944. He left his post as SSPF in Warsaw on 1 February 1945 and was appointed commander of the Ordnungspolizei forces in Prague in the Protectorate of Bohemia-Moravia where he remained until the end of the war in Europe on 8 May 1945.

SS and Police Ranks
Date	Rank
1 April 1935	Major der gendarmerie
1 December 1938	SS-Sturmbannführer
1 July 1939	SS-Obersturmbannführer
14 July 1942	Oberst der gendarmerie
1 October 1942	SS-Standartenführer
20 April 1943	SS-Oberführer
26 October 1944	SS-Brigadeführer und Generalmajor der polizei

== Postwar prosecutions ==
Geibel was arrested in Czechoslovakia, tried and sentenced to five years at hard labor. After serving this prison sentence, he was extradited to Poland. There he was tried by the Warsaw Provincial Court and sentenced to life imprisonment on 31 May 1954 for his activities as SSPF in suppressing the Warsaw uprising. Briefly released from custody in 1956 on grounds of good conduct, he was soon re-incarcerated following an outcry by Polish survivors of the uprising. Geibel took his own life in Warsaw's Mokotów Prison while still in custody there.

== Sources ==
- Finder, Gabriel N.; Prusin, Alexander V. (2018). Justice Behind the Iron Curtain: Nazis on Trial in Communist Poland. Toronto: University of Toronto Press. ISBN 978-1-487-52268-1.
- Klee, Ernst (2007). Das Personenlexikon zum Dritten Reich. Wer war was vor und nach 1945. Frankfurt-am-Main: Fischer-Taschenbuch-Verlag. ISBN 978-3-596-16048-8.
- Yerger, Mark C. (1997). Allgemeine-SS: The Commands, Units and Leaders of the General SS. Schiffer Publishing Ltd. ISBN 0-7643-0145-4.
