= Jean-Baptiste Decoster (guide) =

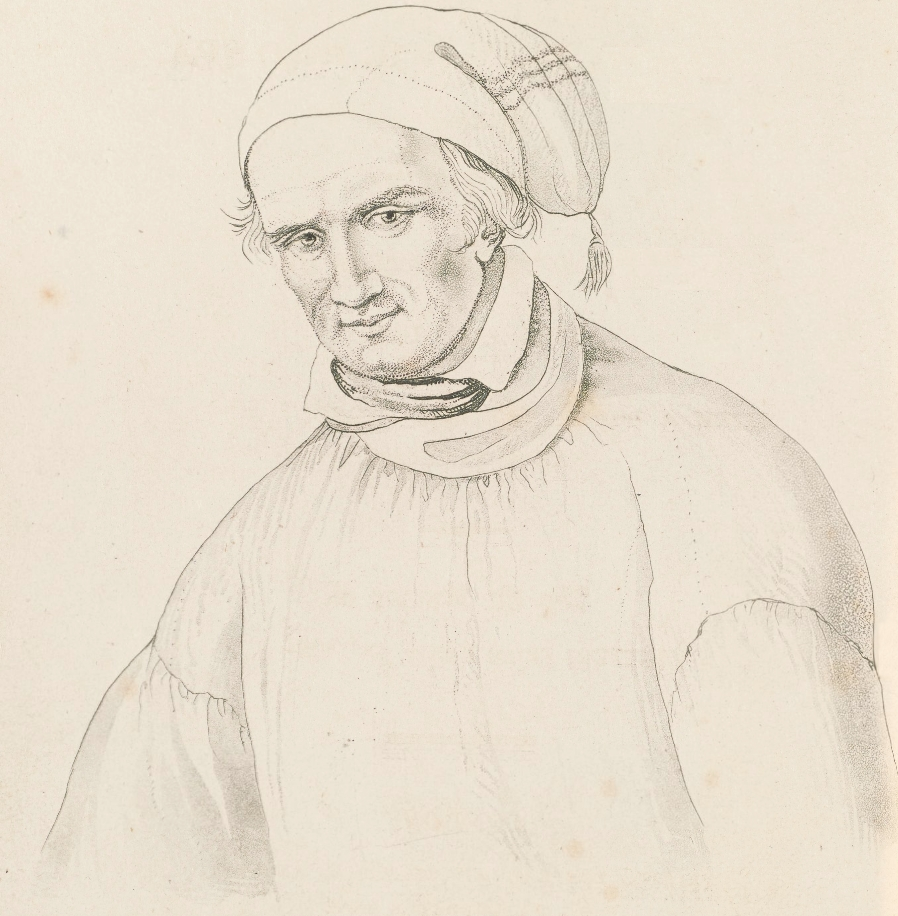
Jean-Baptiste Decoster sketched from life at La Belle Alliance on 16 September 1815 by John James Masquerier.

Jean-Baptiste Decoster (1760–1826) was a farmer who became an unwilling guide for Napoleon Bonaparte during the Battle of Waterloo and later became a tourist battle field guide in the years following the battle.

== Biography ==
Decoster was born 13 October 1760 to Willem de Koster and Anna-Maria de Smet in the village of Korbeek-Lo near Leuven in Flemish Brabant. The contemporary spelling of his surname was usually De Coster, with alternative spellings of De Koster, Dekoster and even Lacoste in some French documents. By 1815 he resided near Plancenoit in Walloon Brabant. Early on 18 June 1815, after he had been to church, he went to the house of his brother in Plancenoit. There he was accosted by French staff officers and escorted to see Napoleon, who, having ascertained that he knew the locality, employed him as a local guide during the Battle of Waterloo. Decoster was an unwilling guide, but his recollections form an important primary source for the locations where Napoleon resided during the battle.

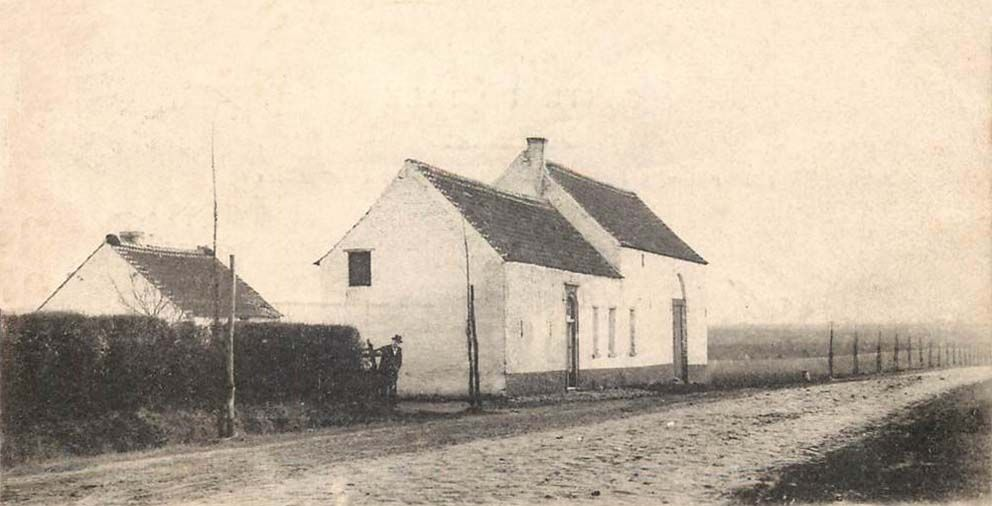
Decoster's house (c. 1900)

Decoster's house stood on the eastern side of the Waterloo–Genappe main road south of the junction with the minor road to Plancenoit (south of La Belle Alliance and north of the farm of Rossomme).

According to Decoster, Napoleon spent the early part of the Battle of Waterloo around Rossomme and then at about 17:00 moved to a hillock or a mound close to Decoster's house, where he remained until about 19:00. He then moved forward with his staff officers and the unwilling Decoster, to a location in the valley to the north of La Belle Alliance (and thus closer to the front line), and remained there during the attack by the French Imperial Guard. Then, according to Decoster, he accompanied Napoleon as far as Genappe during his flight after the retreat of the Guard and the general rout that ensued.

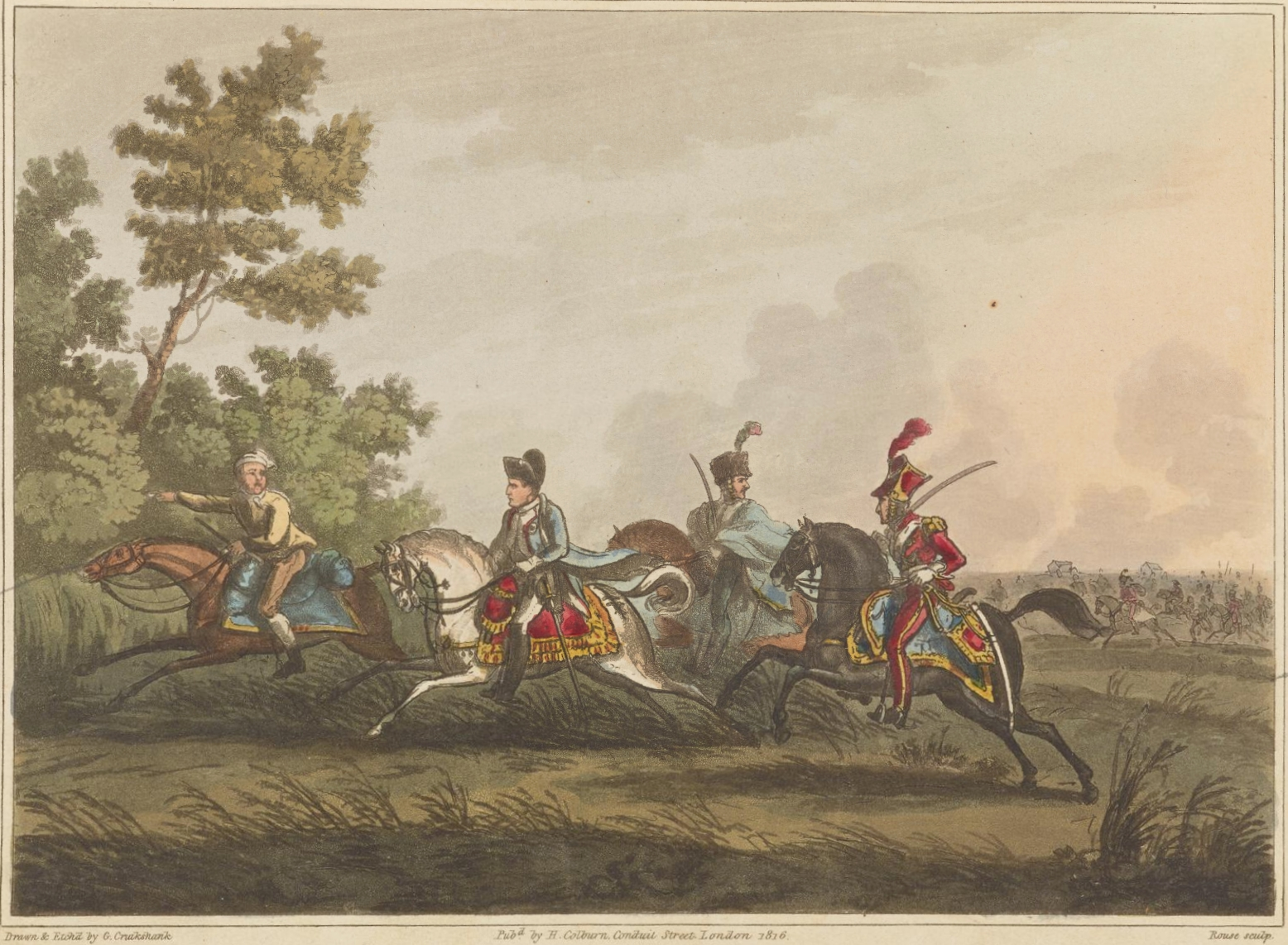
"Flight of Buonaparte from the field of Waterloo accompanied by his guide", engraving by George Cruikshank.

In the months after the battle, he was sought out by battle field tourists. Walter Scott wrote that he did not seem to have realised that he could charge these tourists for his services until Scott took a deposition from him and suggested that tourists such as himself would be willing to pay Decoster for guidance around the battlefield and to hear his reminiscences about the day. He continued guiding for twelve years, which was quite lucrative; in 1826 or 1827 his heirs purportedly inherited 300,000 francs.
