= Decoster's house =

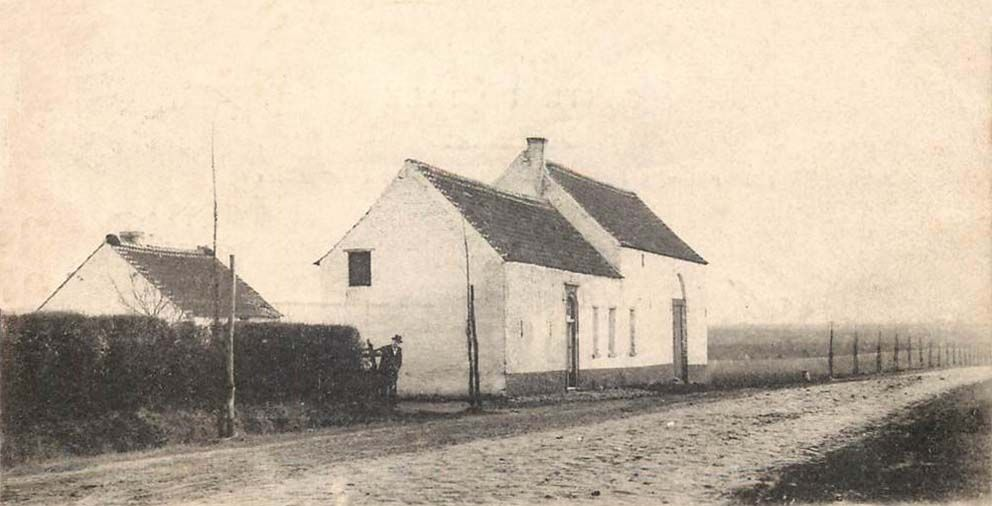
Decoster's house (c. 1900)

Decoster's house was a landmark location during the Battle of Waterloo. It stood on the eastern side of the Waterloo–Genappe main road south of the junction with the minor road to Plancenoit (south La Belle Alliance and north the farm of Rossomme). (Note: "In some maps Decoster's tavern situated a few hundred yards south of La Bell Alliance, is marked Maison d'Ecosse, a corruption of Maison Decoster" (Maxwell 1899, p. 60).) According to Jean-Baptiste Decoster Napoleon spent the early part of the Battle of Waterloo and around Rossomme and then at about 17:00 moved to a position near Decoster's house where he remained until about 19:00.

== History ==
The smallholding belong to Jean-Baptiste Decoster who was an unwilling local guide for Napoleon Bonaparte and his reminiscences form an important primary source for the locations where Napoleon resided during the battle, including a hillock or a mound close to his house. According to Decoster Napoleon spent the early part in and around Rossomme and then at about 17:00 moved to a position near Decoster's house where he remained until about 19:00.

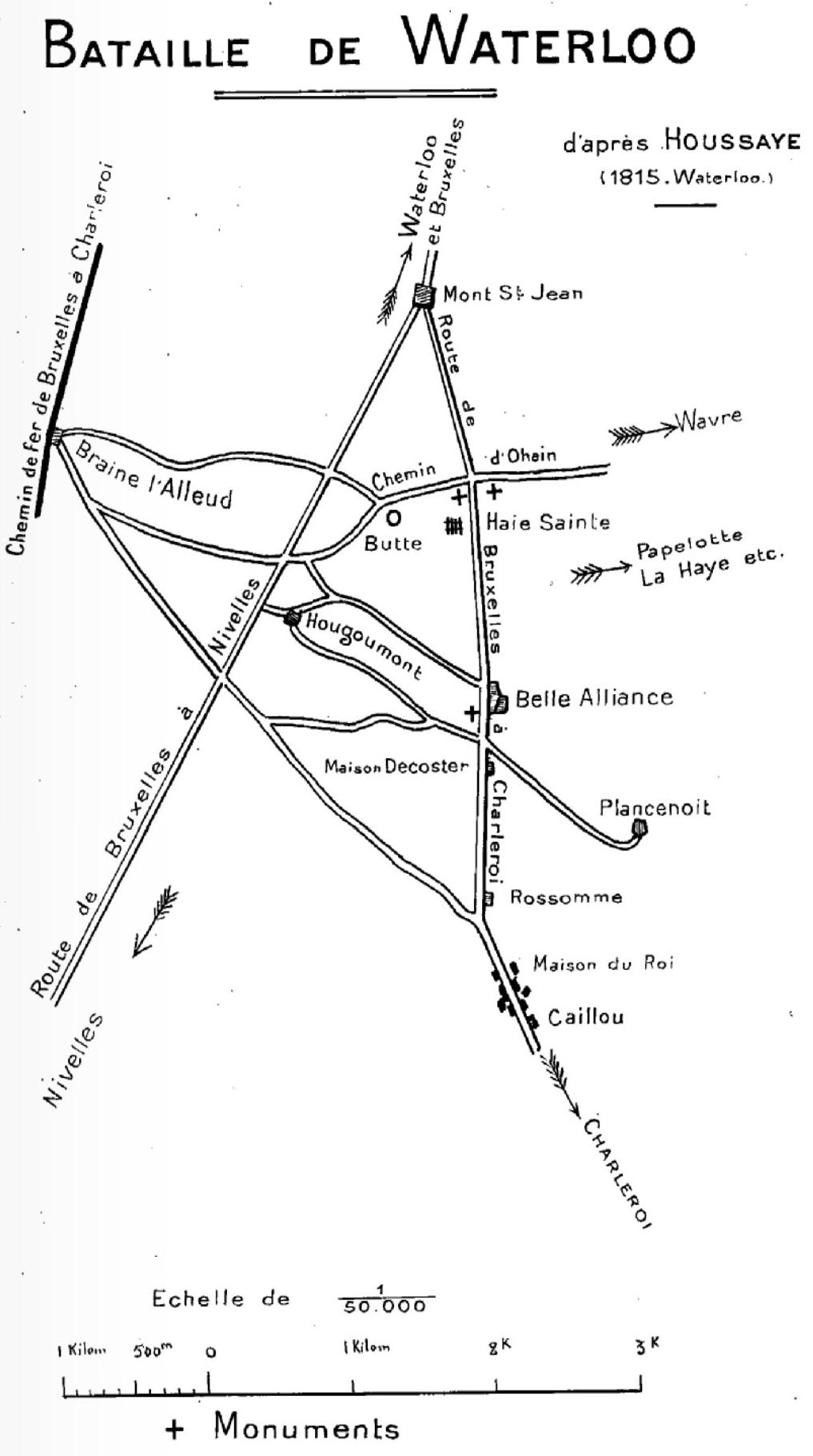
Map of the Battle of Waterloo on which is marked "Maison de Coster" (House of Decoster).

Decoster owned about 6 acres (2.4 ha) of land on which the house was located. The house was used by Decoster as a small inn or "cabaret". Decoster's house is not marked on the Ferraris van kaart of 1777, but the tracks and roads in the area are and the location of the house was recorded in documents written shortly after the battle. For example, Sir Walter Scott writing a few months after the battle places the house "at the distance of a gun-shot from La Belle Alliance", and a map in (to the right) places the house about half a kilometre south of La Belle Alliance and it places Rossomme at 1.5 km from La Belle Alliance—Siborne's 1844 map which is a much or accurate one places Decoster's house at a distance of 1/4 mile (0.40 km) from La Bell Alliance and Rossomme at 3/4 mile (1.2 km), which is a similar ratio—on modern maps as the Rossomme site is 1.3 kilometres (0.81 mi) from La Bel Alliance, this would place Decoster's house 430 metres (470 yd) south La Belle Alliance. (Note: 50.66610°N 4.41373°E 50°39′57.96″N 4°24′49.43″E -- Glover states that the house was located near where the Wounded Eagle monument now stands.; 50.66409°N 4.41381°E 50°39′50.72″N 4°24′49.72″E -- Google; 50.66447°N 4.41382°E 50°39′52.09″N 4°24′49.75″E -- map sketch; 50.66452°N 4.41382°E 50°39′52.27″N 4°24′49.75″E -- Siborne map)

== See also ==
- List of Waterloo Battlefield locations
