= Pierre Chaillet =

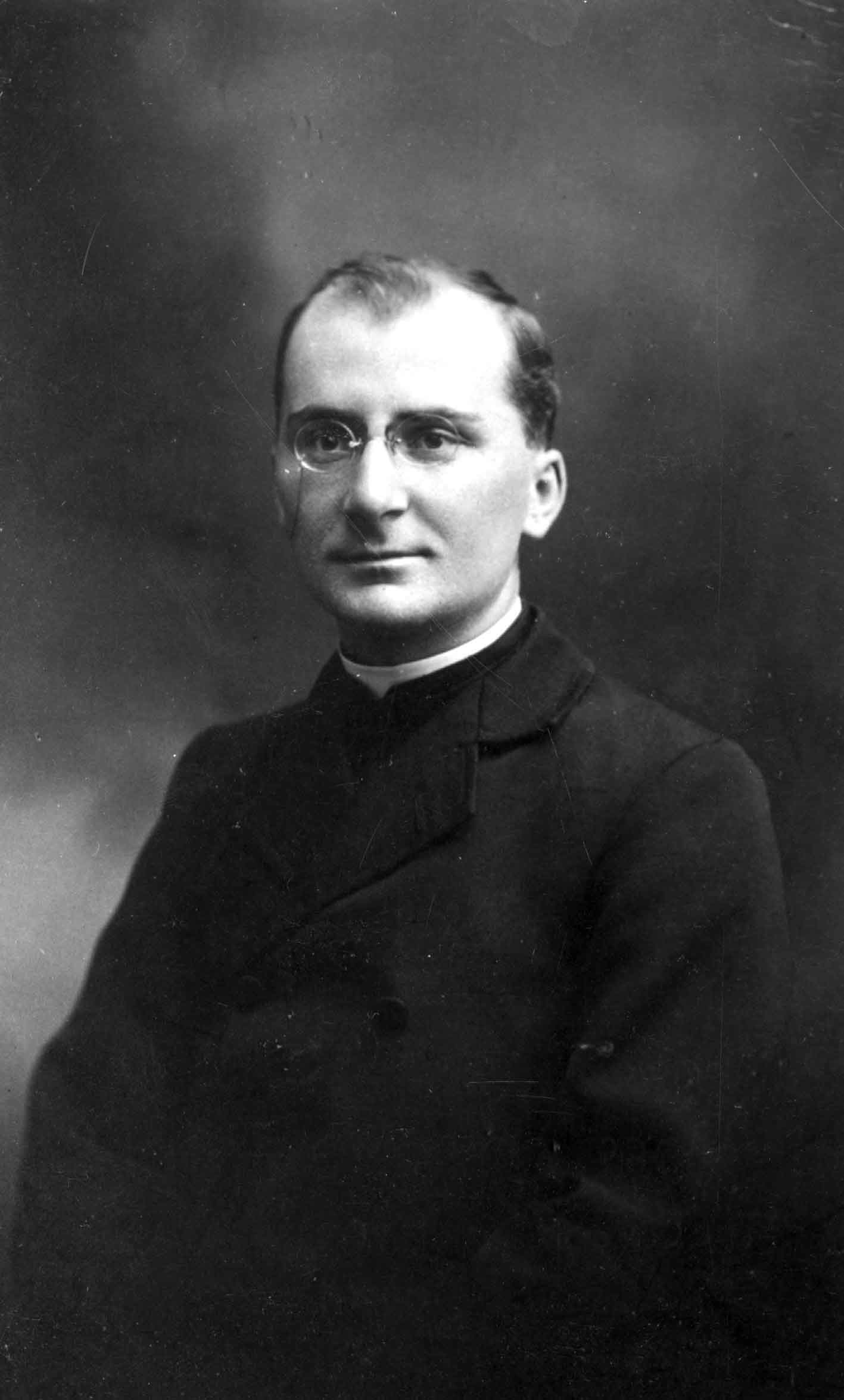
Pierre Chaillet in 1931

Pierre Chaillet (1900–1972) was a French Catholic priest of the Society of Jesus (Jesuits), who was recognised as Righteous among the Nations by Yad Vashem for his work to protect Jews from the Nazi Holocaust.

The Amitiés Chrétiennes organisation operated out of Lyon to secure hiding places for Jewish children. Among its members was the Jesuit Pierre Chaillet. The influential French theologian Henri de Lubac SJ was active in the resistance to Nazism and antisemitism. He assisted in the publication of Témoinage chrétien with Pierre Chaillet, responding to Neo-paganism and antisemitism with clarity, describing the notion of an Aryan New Testament standing in contradiction to a Semitic Old Testament as "blasphemy" and "stupidity".

== See also ==
- Jesuits and Nazism
