= Jean-Baptiste De Coster (Jesuit) =

Belgian priest

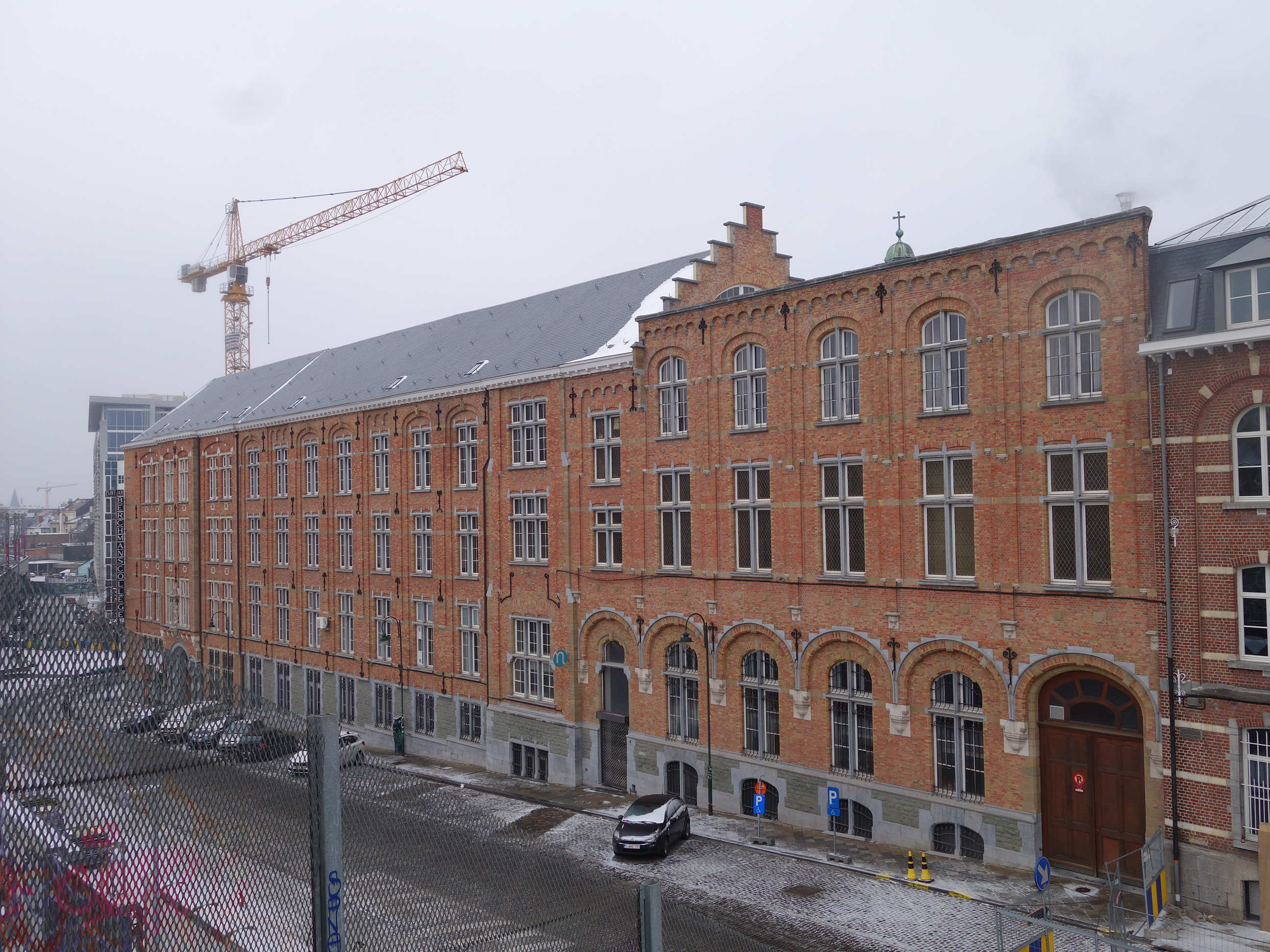
Modern-day view of the College of Saint John Berchmans in Brussels

Jean-Baptiste De Coster (1896–1968) was a Belgian Jesuit who was recognised as Righteous Among the Nations for his role in sheltering Jews from Nazi persecution in German-occupied Belgium during World War II.

During the occupation, De Coster was the headmaster of the College of Saint John Berchmans in Brussels. De Coster used the school to hide Jews, particularly children, from Nazi persecution. Some refugees were also hidden by De Coster in a monastery and disguised as novice monks. Among others it is known that De Coster found a place to hide for the Blinder family. De Coster reportedly stated: "If these persecuted people are taken, I would have the consolation to leave with them."

De Coster was recognised as Righteous Among the Nations by Israel in 1975.

== See also ==
- Jesuits and Nazi Germany
