= La Belle Alliance =

Inn near the battlefield of Waterloo

Coordinates: 50°40′6″N 4°24′49″E

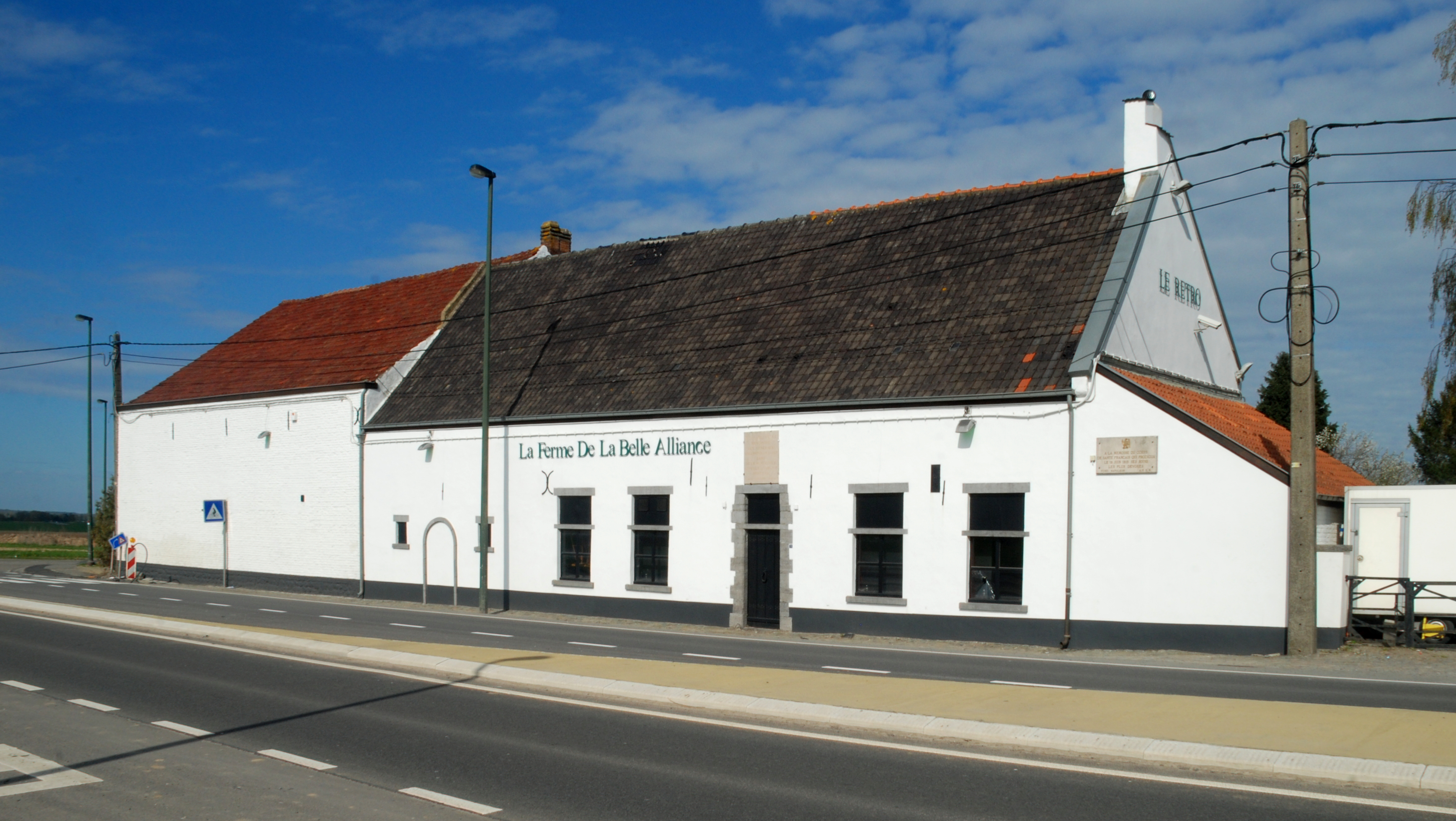
La Belle-Alliance.

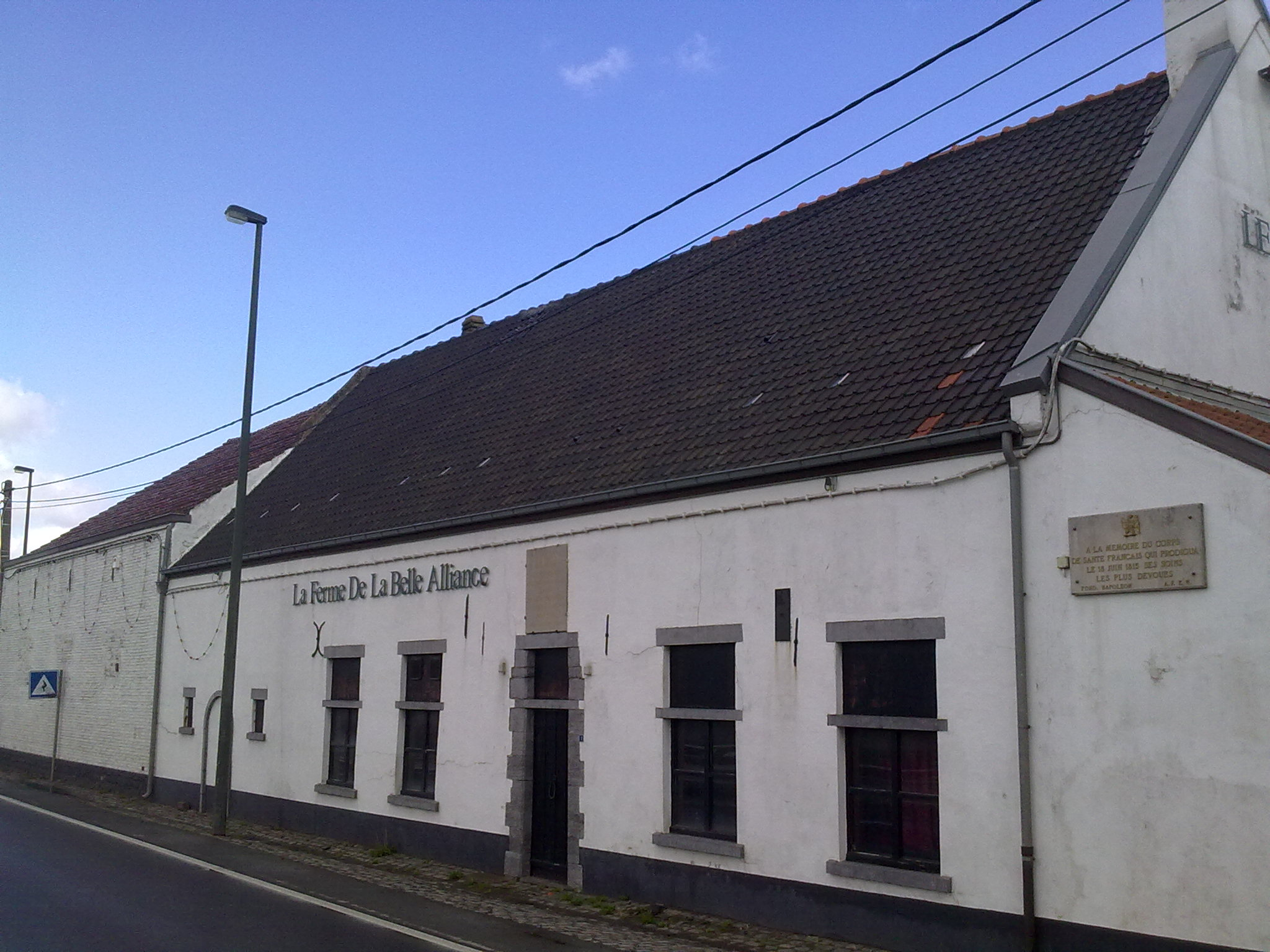
Belle Alliance farm. West Facade Ouest along the N5 in 2012.

La Belle Alliance (French pronunciation: [la bɛl aljɑ̃s]) is an inn situated a few miles south of Brussels in Belgium, chiefly remembered for its significance in the aftermath of the Battle of Waterloo (18 June 1815).

There are two plaques on the building: one is "In memory of the French Medical Corps who attended the wounded with devotion on 18 June 1815"; and the other commemorates the meeting of the two victorious field marshals at the end of the Battle of Waterloo.

== Current use ==
The building is currently used on Friday and Saturday evenings as a night club.

== Battle of Waterloo ==
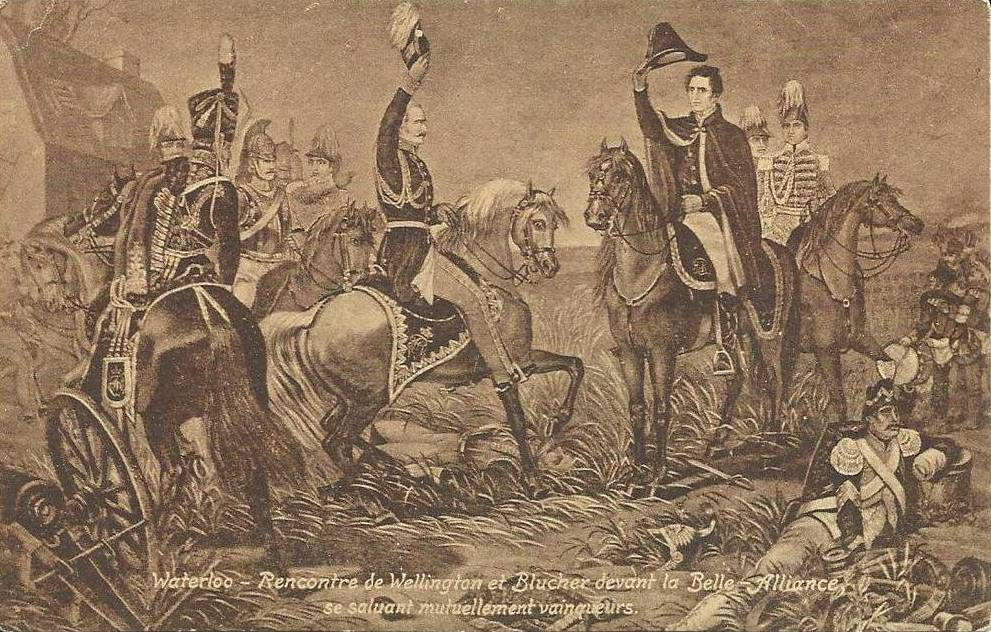
Victorious Coalition Field Marshals Blücher and Wellington meeting close to La Belle Alliance.

After the Battle of Waterloo, at around 21:00, Prince Blücher and the Duke of Wellington met close to the inn signifying the end of the fighting. There is a large mural within the Palace of Westminster painted by Daniel Maclise in 1861 that depicts the meeting taking place at La Belle Alliance. (Note: The Edinburgh Review 1866, p. 14 Our readers are aware that considerable doubt has been thrown upon the time and place at which the meeting of the Duke of Wellington and Marshal Blücher took place after the battle, more especially by the erroneous declaration of the Duke himself that it occurred at Genappe, which, as we have shown in this Journal (Ed. Rev. vol. cxix. p. 168) was impossible, as Genappe was in the possession of the French till near midnight. We have, however, now before us some additional evidence on this interesting topic, which shows that Mr. Maclise's picture does not depart more widely from the truth of history than the license of art may fairly admit of. A formal declaration, which we have seen, has been drawn up by General Count Nostitz, who was personal aide-de-camp to Blücher in 1815, in which he states must positivity that the meeting of Blücher and Wellington did take place at La Belle Alliance—that the two generals congratulated each other there on their victory, and concerted measures for the pursuit of the enemy during the night. On the other hand, Sir William Gomm states that the meeting certainly did not take place at La Belle Alliance, but at a place so near it that the Prussians were justified in slightly extending the application of so appropriate a name. "The point of meeting", says Sir William, "was at or near to a small farmhouse or cabaret called 'Maison Rouge', on the roadside between 'La Belle Alliance' and Rossomme, a more considerable farmhouse and the furthest point on the road to which the Duke advanced. He was returning from it when the meeting took place". Lastly, the Duke himself said to Mr. Rogers (Rogers' Recollections, p. 212), "When all was over, Blücher and I met at "La Maison Rouge". The evidence is therefore decisive (as we had previously remarked) that La Maison Rouge was the real place of meeting, but the distance from La Maison Rouge to La Belle Alliance is inconsiderable, and the Duke was returning towards La Belle Alliance when he met Blücher on the road.) According to page 57 of his 1877 Book "Notes and Reminiscences of a Staff Officer" by Lieutenant Colonel Basil Jackson, writes: Certainly it was a moment when even the Iron Duke might feel excited. I heard him say to Colborne (who had stopped the 52nd and was forming his troops for the Duke to review), as he shook hands on departing, that he would endeavour to send some flour for his men. He then turned his horse towards Waterloo, followed by five persons only. On nearing the farm of La Belle Alliance, a group of horsemen were seen crossing the fields on our right; on seeing them, the Duke left the road to meet them. They proved to be Marshal Blücher and his suite. The two great chiefs cordially shook hands, and were together about ten minutes; it was then so dark that I could not distinguish Blucher's features, and had to ask a Prussian officer whom the Duke was conversing with, although I was quite close to him at the time, but of course not near enough to hear what was said. On leaving Blucher, the Duke rode at a walk towards Waterloo. Darkness shrouded the spectacle of the dead and dying near La Haye Sainte; but the frequent snorting of our horses as they trod between them showed that the ground, so fiercely contested during the day, was very thickly strewed with bodies of the brave.

Blücher, the Prussian commander, suggested that the battle be remembered as la Belle Alliance, to commemorate the European Seventh Coalition of Britain, Russia, Prussia, the Netherlands, Sweden, Austria, Spain, Portugal, Sardinia, and a number of German States which had all joined the coalition to defeat the French Emperor. Wellington, who had chosen the field and commanded an allied army which had fought the French all day, instead recommended Waterloo, the village just north of the battlefield, where he himself had spent the previous night. Nevertheless, in 1815 the Rondell plaza in Berlin was renamed Belle-Alliance-Platz to commemorate the victory. There is a single La Belle Alliance Square in the UK, in Ramsgate, Kent.

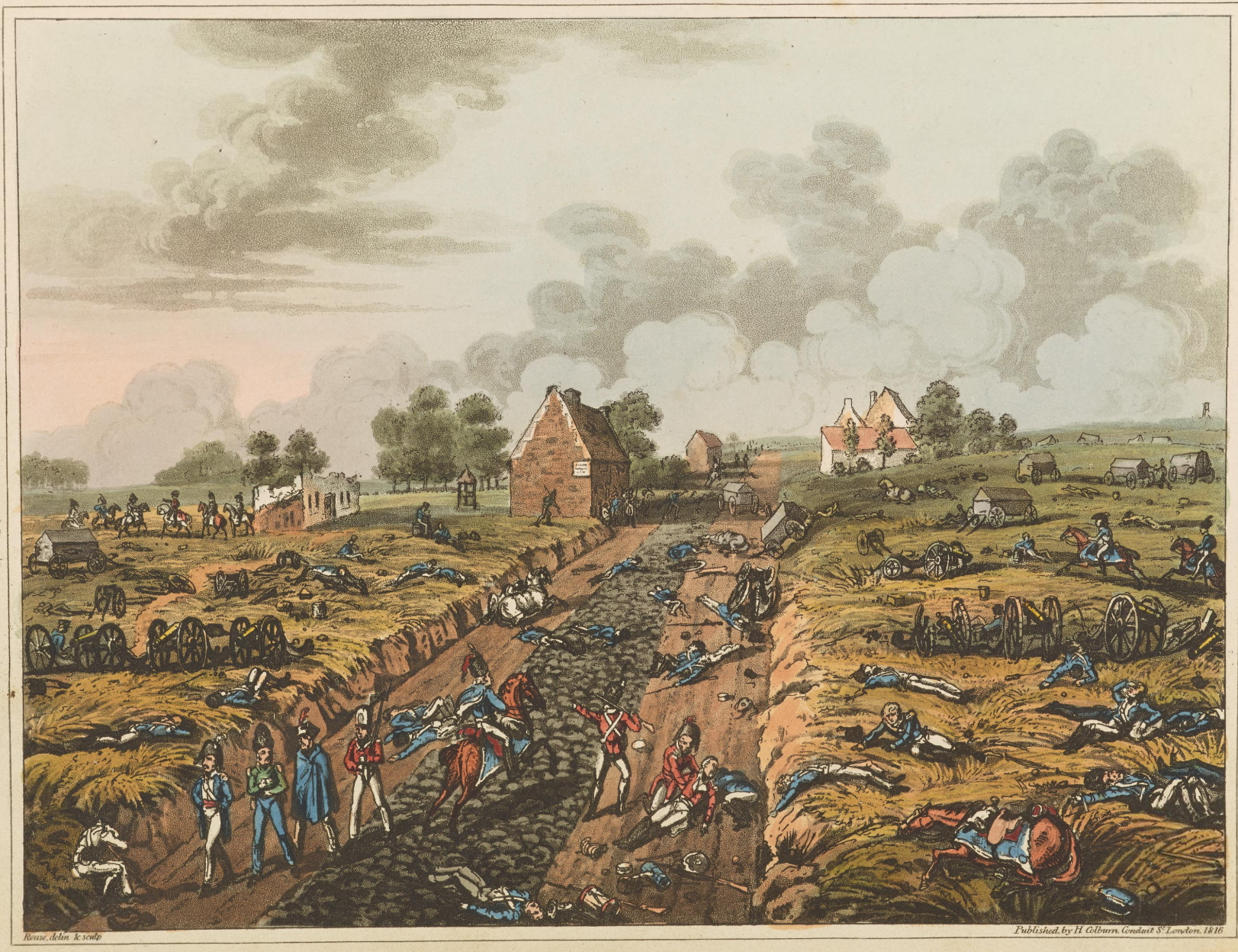
"La Belle Alliance, the centre of the French position". Engraver James Rouse

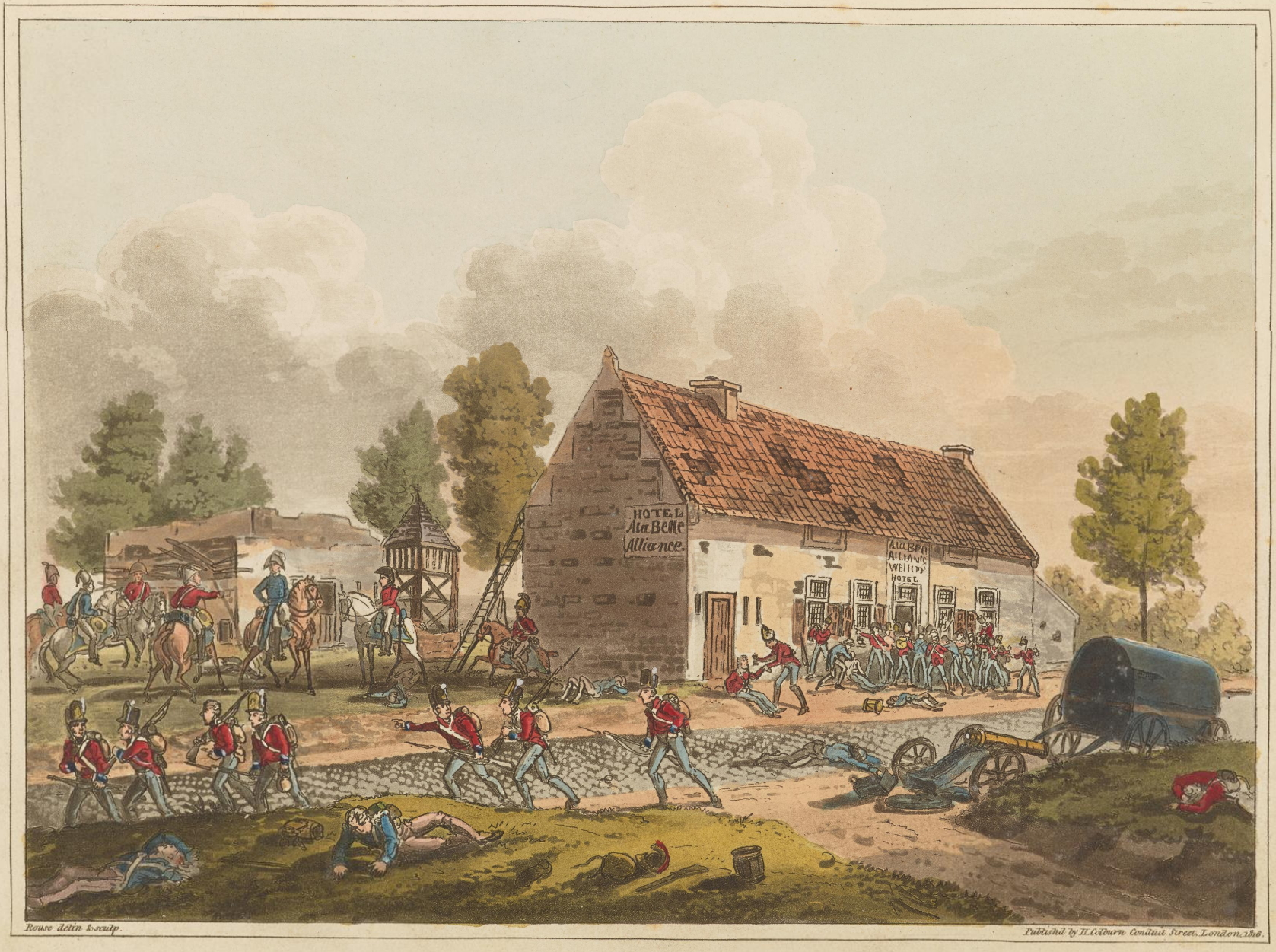
"View of La Belle Alliance". Engraver James Rouse

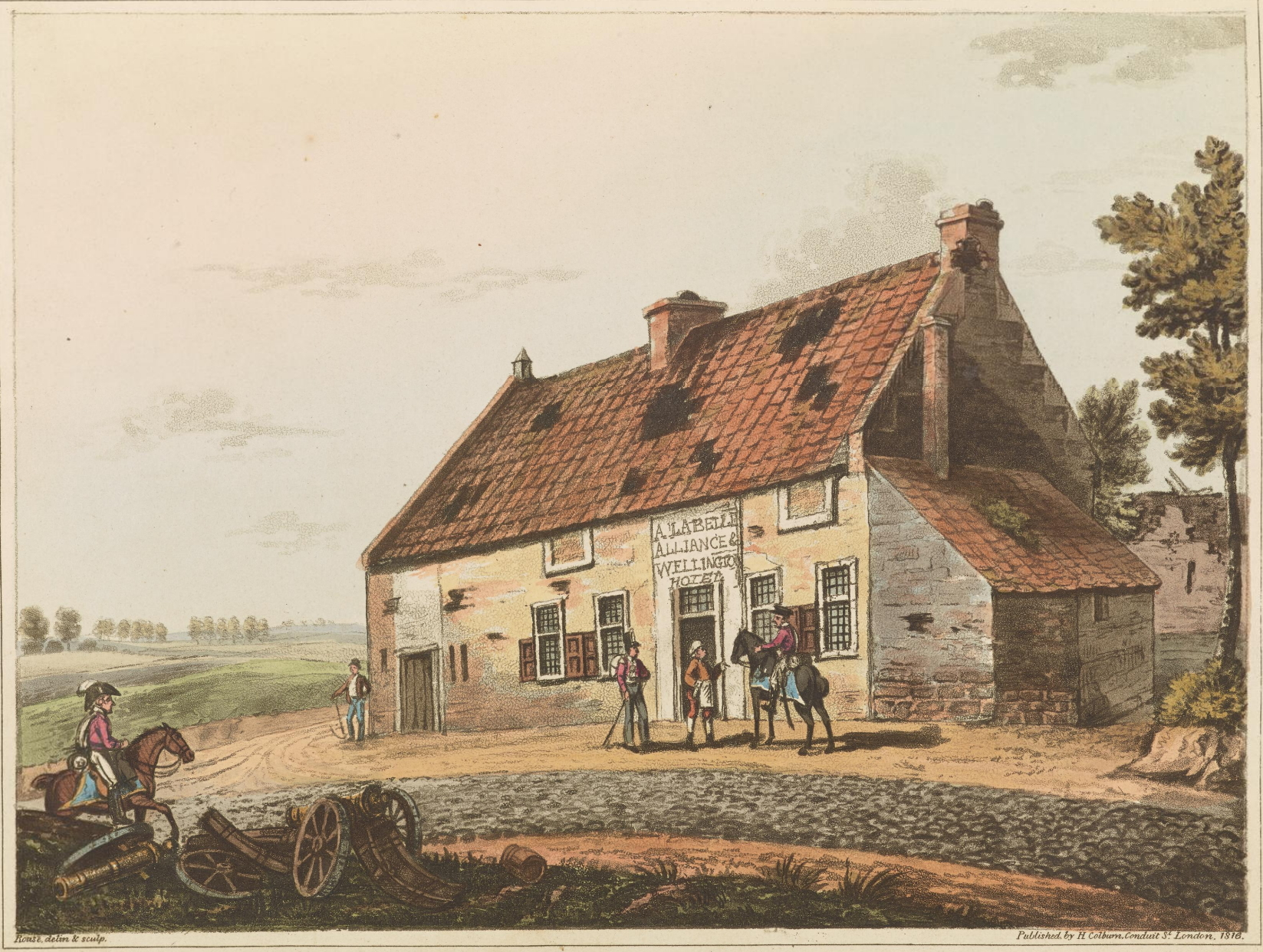
"View of La Belle Alliance". Engraver James Rouse

== Name ==
According to J.B. Romberg who published an account of the locations around Brussels in 1820, originally La Belle Alliance consisted of three houses, one of which was a tavern, that now bears the name, and two adjacent houses. Some time before the Battle of Waterloo, the publican of the tavern died, and his widow married the occupant of Trimotion, the farm-house opposite; but losing him in a short time afterwards, she consoled herself by taking for her third husband a peasant who lived a house close by (now known as Decoster's house); but here again death interrupted her happiness, when she once more embraced the married state it was to marry the new landlord tavern; from which time it obtained the title it now bears.

== See also ==
- List of Waterloo Battlefield locations
