= Prison in Stauferkaserne barracks =

Prison in Poland

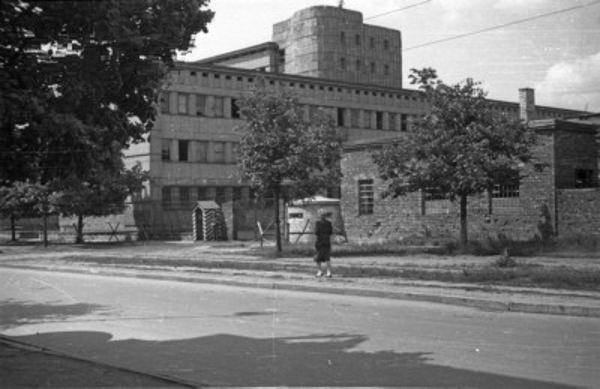
SS-Stauferkaserne. View from Kazimierzowska Street.

Stauferkaserne prison was a provisional prison, and at the same time a gathering point for expelled Warsaw residents, established by the Germans during the first days of the Warsaw Uprising on the grounds of the SS-Stauferkaserne barracks at 4 Rakowiecka Street. In August and September 1944 over a thousand residents of the district passed through the SS barracks in Mokotów. They were detained there in harsh conditions and were subjected to extremely brutal treatment. During the Warsaw Uprising, the Stauferkaserne area was the scene of numerous executions, the victims of which were at least 100 people.

== Establishment of the prison ==
During the German occupation, the complex of buildings of the Main Staff of the Polish Army, located at 4 Rakowiecka Street in Warsaw's Mokotów, was transformed into SS barracks - the so-called SS-Stauferkaserne. When the Warsaw Uprising broke out, it housed the 3rd SS Grenadier Reserve Battalion, which consisted of about 600 soldiers supported by a company of tanks. On August 1, 1944, the barracks were attacked by Home Army soldiers from the assault battalion "Odwet II" and the artillery group "Granat" (Note: Constituting part of the region IV of division V of the 'Mokotów' Home Army) but the SS men, who were perfectly armed and well-established, managed to repel the Polish attack.

In the morning of August 2, the SS from the Stauferkaserne garrison started to suppress the quarters of Mokotów located closest to the barracks. The inhabitants of Rakowiecka, Puławska, Kazimierzowska, Rejtana, Wiśniowa, Niepodległości, Asfaltowa, Opoczyńska and Fałata Streets were expelled from their homes, and then among beatings and screams they were rushed to Stauferkaserne. By 8 p.m. several hundred civilians were forced to wait in the rain in the courtyard of the barracks. The SS men fired a series of shots from machine guns over their heads, thus intensifying the mood of panic. SS-Obersturmführer Martin Patz, commander of the Stauferkaserne, spoke to the imprisoned Poles. (Note: Before the war, Martin Patz was a teacher of German at the University of Poznań. During the Warsaw Uprising, his battalion committed a number of crimes against the population of Mokotów. Apart from the murders in Stauferkaserne, Patz's was also charged with the massacre in the Mokotów prison and the massacre in the Jesuit monastery at Rakowiecka Street. For this reason, he is sometimes called the "Butcher of Mokotów".) He declared to the gathered that they were held hostage and that if the uprising does not fall within three days everyone will be shot dead. Moreover, he announced that for every German killed by the insurgents, Poles would be executed. Then the men were separated from the women and children and both groups were placed in different barracks. Most women and children were released in the evening the next day.

In the following days the population of Mokotów continued to arrive in Stauferkaserne - mainly men. The barracks began to serve as a makeshift prison and at the same time as a gathering point for the expelled residents of the district. It operated until approximately mid-September 1944, although many Poles were kept in barracks until the beginning of October. After a longer or shorter stay in Stauferkaserne, the prisoners were usually sent to the transit camp in Pruszków or other assembly points set up by the Germans for the expelled population of Warsaw.

== Living conditions of prisoners ==
The first group of men expelled to Stauferkaserne received food and drinks only the next day, and some of them received it three days after their detention. Starting on August 5 or so, the Germans allowed Polish women to bring food to relatives imprisoned in the barracks. However, there were several cases when SS men opened fire for no reason on women walking under the white flag. Several women were killed or wounded at that time.

Zbigniew Bujnowicz, imprisoned in Stauferkaserne, recalled that the life of Poles detained in the barracks resembled the conditions prevailing in concentration camps. At 5:30 a.m. there was a wake-up call, followed by an assembly. After the assembly, the prisoners were given breakfast, which usually consisted of 1-2 biscuits and black coffee. The prisoners worked until lunchtime at 1:00 p.m. Usually, they were given a portion of cooked groats as a meal. Later, the prisoners returned to work, which lasted until 7:00 p.m., when the two-hour break for supper began. Afterwards, the prisoners worked until 2:00 a.m.

The work performed by the prisoners included cleaning latrines with bare hands, dismantling insurgent barricades, cleaning tanks, burial of corpses, earthworks on the barracks (e.g. digging up communication ditches), cleaning streets, moving and loading goods robbed by the Germans onto cars. Many of these works were aimed only at the exhaustion and humiliation of the detainees. The SS from the Stauferkaserne crew tormented the prisoners at every opportunity. Continuous beating was a common occurrence.

The difficult living and working conditions soon led to the complete exhaustion of the prisoners. An epidemic of dysentery broke out among the Poles detained in Stauferkaserne. After some time, a group of people gathered around the inspector of the Polish Red Cross, Jan Wierzbicki, managed to force the Germans to create a sanitary unit consisting of Polish prisoners. Initially, it was composed of 16 members, but after some time it reached 60 members, including two doctors and two nurses. The sanitary department even had its own truck at its disposal. Apart from taking care of the prisoners, Stauferkaserne's sanitary staff also provided medical assistance to Poles living in the Mokotów quarter, which was under German control (mainly in the area from Rakowiecka Street to Madalińskiego Street), (Note: More serious cases were referred to the makeshift hospital of the Sisters of the Immaculate Conception of the Blessed Virgin Mary at Kazimierzowska Street or to the hospital at Chocimska Street.) as well as buried the corpses of killed civilians and insurgents. On the other hand, health care personnel was strictly forbidden to help injured Poles who were suspected of taking part in the uprising.

== Executions in the Stauferkaserne ==
During the Warsaw Uprising, at least 100 residents of Mokotów were murdered in Stauferkaserne. As early as August 3, (other testimonies give the date of August 4), the Germans randomly chose about 45 men from among the prisoners, who were then taken out of the prison in groups of 15 and shot outside the barracks. Among the killed was an Orthodox priest, whom the SS ordered to sing before being executed. The corpses were buried in the area of the Mokotów prison opposite Stauferkaserne. The remaining prisoners were told that the execution was a retaliation for the alleged execution of 30 Volksdeutsche by the insurgents.

On August 4 a group of about 40 men from a house located at the corner of Narbutta and Niepodległości Streets was brought to Stauferkaserne. All of them were shot with machine guns in the courtyard of the barracks. The wounded were killed with pistols.

Single executions, usually ordered by SS-Obersturmführer Patz, often took place in the barracks. Patz once ordered to shoot a man with an unpleasant face grimace (resulting from health reasons) that he considered to be a mockery. When the prisoners started to rebel against the destructive manner of work, the SS hanged one of them in front of their companions for punishment. The execution was led by one of the most cruel SS men from the Stauferkaserne crew, SS-Rottenführer Franckowiak.

Moreover, some of the men imprisoned in the barracks were taken by Gestapo "kennels" in an unknown direction and all their traces disappeared. On August 9, among others, about 20-40 prisoners were taken away in this manner. On one day at the turn of August and September, nearly 70 men disappeared in a similar way. It is probable that the Poles taken by the Gestapo were executed in the ruins of the General Inspectorate of the Armed Forces or in other places of execution near the Sicherheitspolizei headquarters in Szucha Avenue. Women imprisoned in Stauferkasserne, on the other hand, were rushed forward as "living shields" in front of German tanks.

On August 8 Patz sent a delegation of 100 women to Colonel "Daniel", commander of the Home Army in Mokotów, with a categorical demand for capitulation, threatening to shoot all Poles imprisoned in Stauferkaserne in case of refusal. However, Patz did not succeed, as "Daniel" threatened to impose similar sanctions on Germans who had been taken captive.

== Epilogue ==
After the war, the buildings of the former Stauferkaserne still served as the seat of the General Staff of the Polish Army (it is located there to this day). The place of death of many inhabitants of Mokotów has not been commemorated in any way.

The SS-Obersturmführer Martin Patz trial began in 1978 in the Cologne Court. He was tried primarily for the murder of 600 prisoners in Mokotów prison at 37 Rakowiecka Street by SS men reporting to him on August 2, 1944. In February 1980 Patz was convicted and sentenced to 9 years in prison. Karl Misling, who was tried in the same trial, received a 4-year prison sentence.

== Bibliography ==
- Lesław M. Bartelski: Mokotów 1944. Warszawa: wydawnictwo MON, 1986. ISBN 83-11-07078-4.
- Szymon Datner, Kazimierz Leszczyński (red.): Zbrodnie okupanta w czasie powstania warszawskiego w 1944 roku (w dokumentach). Warszawa: wydawnictwo MON, 1962.
- Maja Motyl, Stanisław Rutkowski: Powstanie Warszawskie – rejestr miejsc i faktów zbrodni. Warszawa: GKBZpNP-IPN, 1994.
- Friedo Sachser. Central Europe. Federal Republic of Germany. Nazi Trials. „American Jewish Year Book”. 82, 1982.
- Ludność cywilna w powstaniu warszawskim. T. I. Cz. 2: Pamiętniki, relacje, zeznania. Warszawa: Państwowy Instytut Wydawniczy, 1974.
