= Wierzbno =

Neighbourhood in Warsaw, Poland

- City Information System area (neighbourhood)
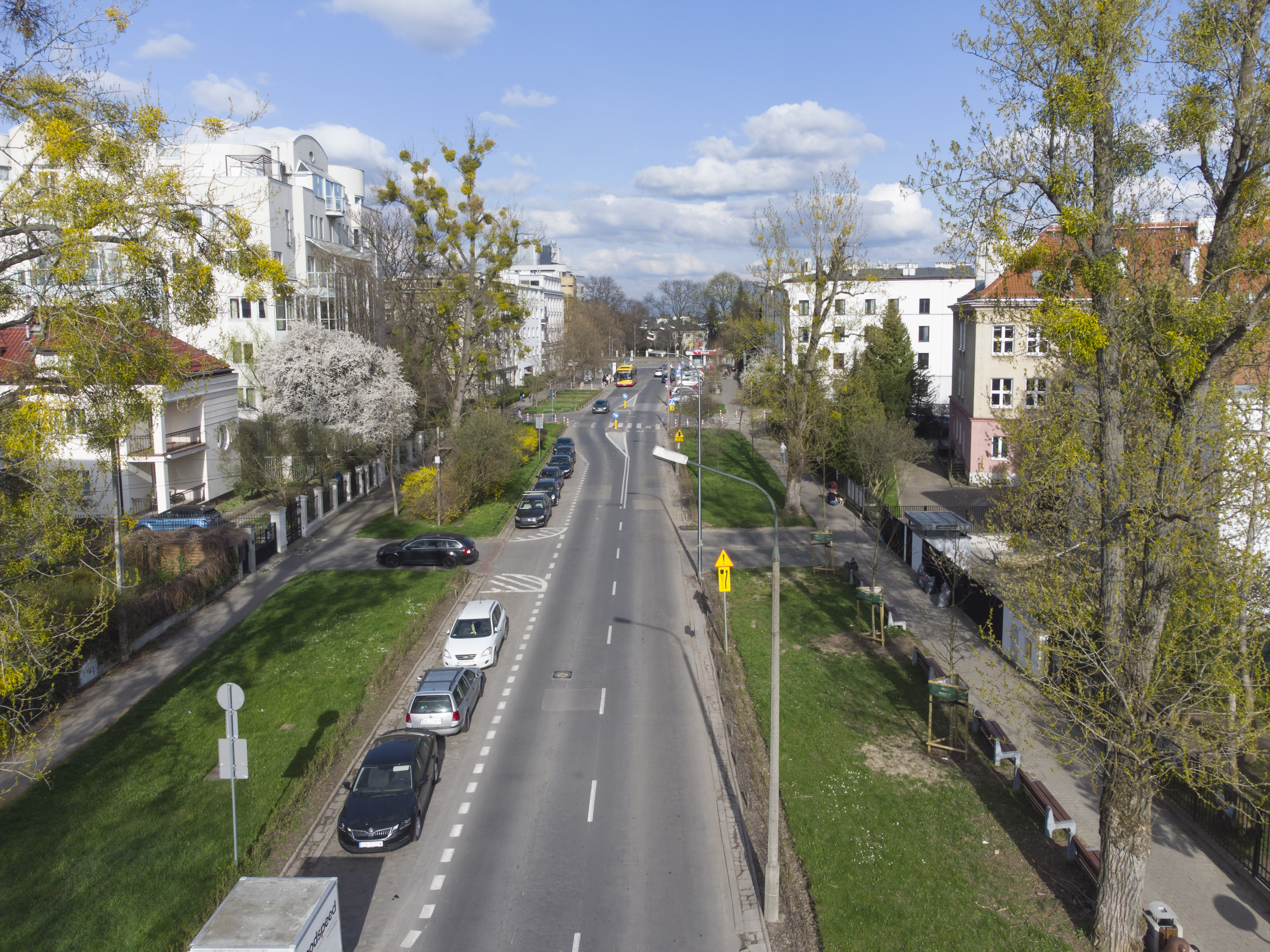
- Houses on Malczewskiego Street in Wierzbno.

- The location of Wierzbno within the Mokotów district.
- Coordinates: 52°11′40″N 21°00′52″E
- Country: Poland
- Voivodeship: Masovian
- City county: Warsaw
- District: Mokotów
- Subdistrict: Upper Mokotów
- Administrative neighbourhood: Wierzbno
- Time zone: UTC+1 (CET)
  - Summer (DST): UTC+2 (CEST)
- Area code: +48 22

Wierzbno (Polish: [ˈvjɛʐ.bnɔ]) is a neighbourhood, and a City Information System area, in Warsaw, Poland, located within the northwestern portion of the Mokotów district. The area is part of its western half, known as the Upper Mokotów. The neighbourhood is a residential area. This includes the housing estates of Wierzbno and Skarpa Puławska, in the east and west, respectively, consisting of the mid- and high-rise apartment buildings. It also has single-family detached homes and tenements in the east. The area also includes the Dreszer Park and Arcadia Park, as well as the Warszawianka sports complex. Wierzbno also includes the Fanshawe Palace, a neoclassical residence from around 1850, and the Saint Michael the Archangel Church, a parish church built between 1950 and 1966. It also features the Polish Radio, a national public-service radio broadcasting organisation. The neighbourhood also has the Racławicka and Wierzbno stations of the M1 line of the Warsaw Metro underground rapid transit system.

Some documents from 15th century suggest that a settlement existed in the area of modern Wierzbno, which was then deserted and incorporated into Mokotów. Wierzbno was established as a small hamlet in the 1770s, by Józef Jakubowski, a brigadier in the French Army. In the early 19th century, the hamlet of Henryków was founded to its east, being originally settled by French people. In 1786, the Rabbit House palace was built to the south of Wierzbno. In 1840, nobleperson Ksawer Pusłowski had built his residence, known as the Ksawerów Manor House, to the south of Wierzbno, and in 1849, he had bought the nearby Rabbit House palace, which was built in 1786. Over time, the area developed into two separate settlements, known as Ksawerów and Królikarnia. In the 19th century Wierzbno functioned as a holiday village. In 1856, the Church of the Nativity of the Blessed Virgin Mary was built in Wierzbno, becoming a Roman Catholic parish church in 1917. It was demolished in 1944 during the Second World War, and replaced by the Saint Michael the Archangel Church, being built between 1950 and 1966. In 1916, the area was incorporated into the city of Warsaw. Throughout the 1920s and the 1930s, the area developed into a suburban residential neighbourhood with numerous villas and tenements being built there. Between 1956 and 1971, the housing estates of the Wierzbno and Skarpa Puławska were developed in the area, consisting of mid- and high-rise apartment buildings, constructed using the large panel system technology. In 1995, the M1 line of the Warsaw Metro was opened crossing the neighbourhood, with the Racławicka and Wierzbno stations.

== Toponomy ==
The name of Wierzbno comes from Polish word wierzba, which means the willow tree. Its founder, Józef Jakubowski, had originally named it in 18th century as Pod Wierzbą, which means "under a willow", most likely referring to willow trees present in the area.

== History ==
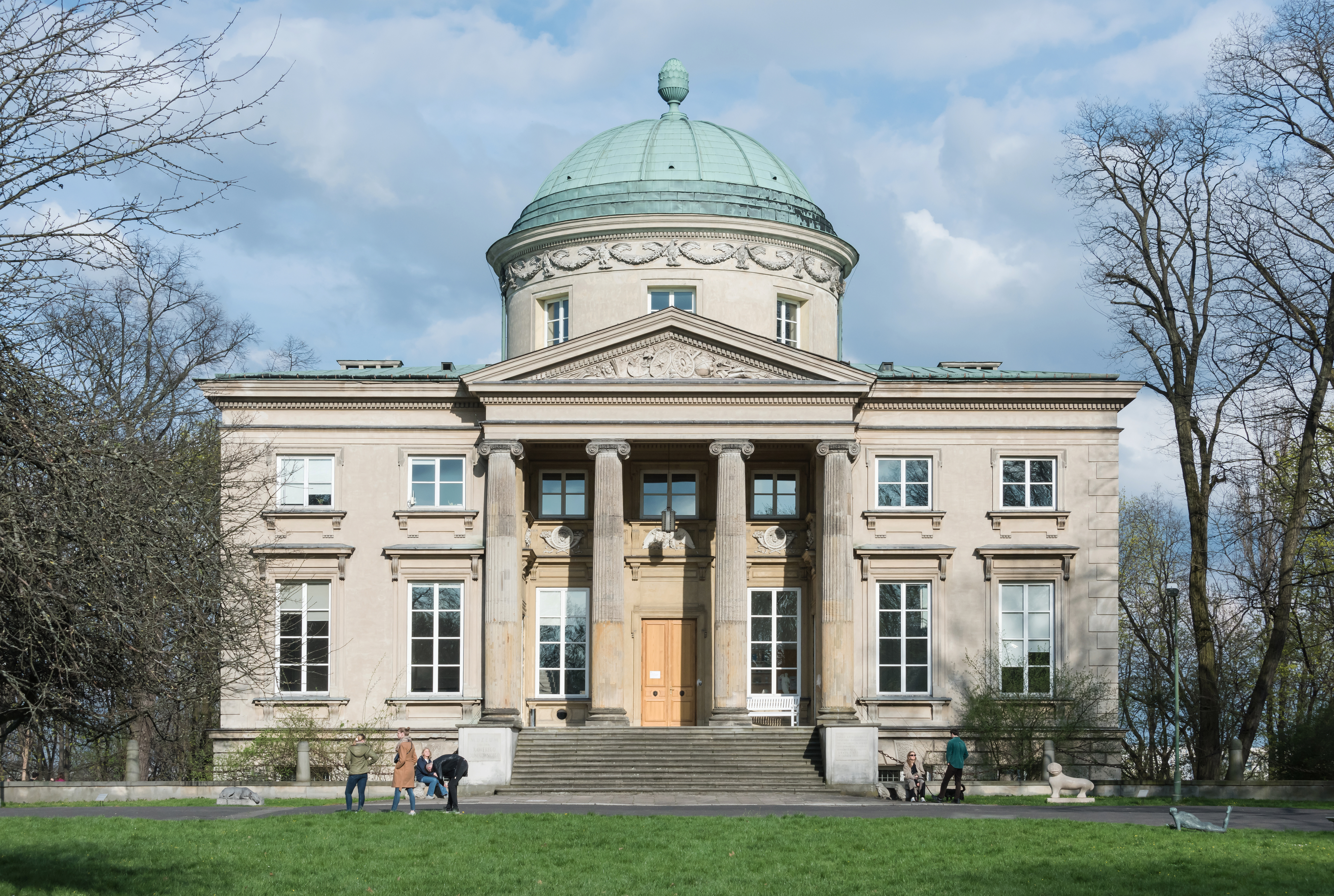
The Rabbit House palace, built in 1786, to the south of Wierzbno.

Some documents from 15th century suggest that a settlement existed in the area of modern Wierzbno, which was then deserted and incorporated into Mokotów.

In 1732, a pavilion, designed by Carl Friedrich Pöppelmann, was built on the Rabbit Hill, in place of a rabbit husbandry established earlier that century. The structure served as a residence and an observation deck for king Augustus II the Strong, the monarch of the Polish–Lithuanian Commonwealth, during the military exercises and exhibition, which were held from 31 July to 19 August 1732, on the nearby fields in Czerniaków. It was deconstructed around 1735.

In the 1770s, a plot of land was given by king Stanisław August Poniatowski to Józef Jakubowski, a brigadier in the French Army, who then established there a small agricultural estate, with a hamlet called Pod Wierzbą, later renamed to Wierzbno. The term comes from Polish, meaning "under a willow tree".

Between 1782 and 1786, the Rabbit House, a neoclassical palace residence, was built to the south of Wierzbno on the Rabbit Hill. It became residence of buisnessperon Carlo Alessandro Tomatis, and his wife, dancer Caterina Gattai Tomatis, who was a royal mistress of king Stanisław August Poniatowski. The building was designed by Domenico Merlini. In 1794, during the Kościuszko Uprising, it served as the residence of Tadeusz Kościuszko, the leader of the insurgent forces. In 1816, the building was sold to statesman Michał Hieronim Radziwiłł. Currently, the it is located within the City Information System area of Ksawerów.

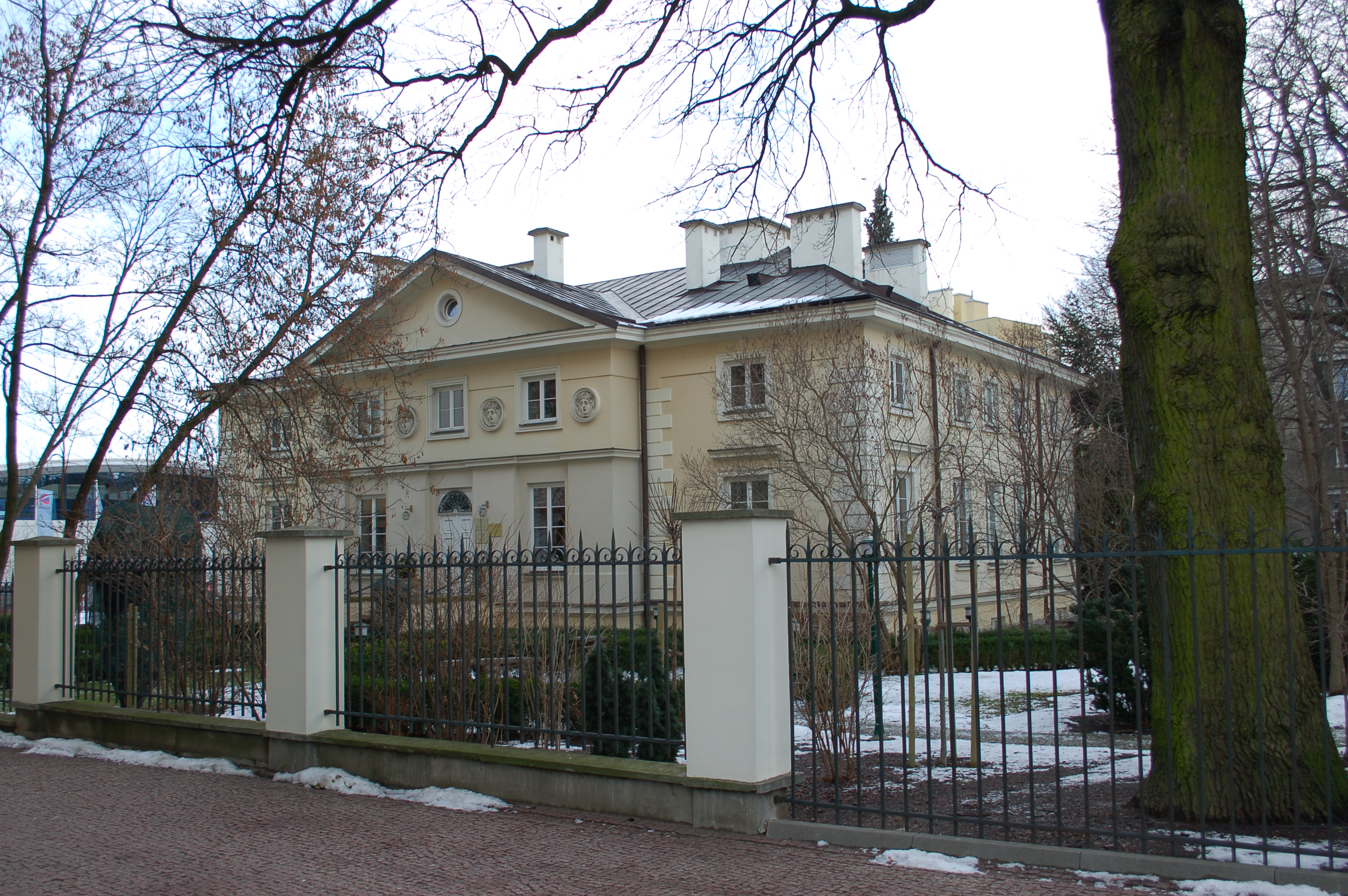
The Fanshawe Palace built around 1850, as the residence of the Fanshawe family, the owners of Henryków.

At the beginning of the 19th century, Henryk Bonnet, a French-born clerk who served as the state councillor and a judge in the district court of Warsaw, bought an area around current Malczewskiego Street, founding a hamlet of Henryków. It was originally inhabited by French settlers, and included a small palace residence of the Bonnet family. In 1824, Louisa Bonnet de Belon, Henryk Bonnet's daughter, married George Fanshawe, an English-born chamberlain and colonel in the Imperial Russian Army. The couple inherited the property around 1830, and around 1850, they built the Fanshawe Palace, in place of their former residence. In 1900, it was inherited by nobleman August Potocki, who, while never living there himself, had accommodated there the less wealthy members of his family. The building was burned down in 1944, during the Warsaw Uprising in the Second World War.

In 1840, nobleman Ksawer Pusłowski built his residence to the south of Wierzbno, now known as Ksawerów Manor House. In 1849, he bought the Rabbit House palace. Over time, the area developed into two separate settlements, known as Ksawerów and Królikarnia.

In 1840, physician Ludwik Sauvan opened a hydrotherapy facility in Wierzbno, which used the local water spring, and operated until 1866. During said century, Wierzbno and Mokotów also became popular holiday villages.

In 1856, the Church of the Nativity of the Blessed Virgin Mary was built at the current intersection of Puławska and Dolna Streets. It originally belonged to the Roman Catholic Parish of St. Alexander, and in 1917, it become a seat of a new parish. It was the first church built within the boundaries of the modern Mokotów district. The building was destroyed in 1944, during the Warsaw Uprising. Between 1950 and 1966, the Saint Michael the Archangel Church was built in its place.

On 13 January 1867, villages of Henryków, Królikarnia, Ksawerów, and Wierzbno became part of the rural municipality of Mokotów, established as part of the administrative reform in the Kingdom of Poland.

In 1881, a tramline connecting Wierzbno with Moktów and Warsaw, was opened with tracks built alongside Puławska Street. It was first operated by a horsecar, and since 1909, by an electric tram. Since 1892, the narrow-gauge tracks were also operated by the Wilanów Railway, and since 1898, also by the Grójec Commuter Railway. In 1906, the Wierzbno station, operated by the Grójec Narrow-Gauge Railway, was opened near the current intersection of Puławska and Woronicza Streets, and near the Rabbit House palace. It operated until 1937. In 1935, the Warsaw Mokotów station, which was previously placed at the Union of Lublin Square, was moved to the intersection of Puławska and Odyńca Streets in Wierzbno, where it operated until 1938.

In 1892, the Fort M-Che was built near Wierzbno by the Imperial Russian Army. It was part of the inner circle of the series of the city fortifications, known as the Warsaw Fortress. It was retired and abandoned in 1909, and demolished in the 1920s.

On April 1916, the municipality of Mokotów, including Henryków, Królikania, Ksawerów, and Wierzbno, was incorporated into Warsaw.

Beginning in 1920s, and continuing through the 1930s, Wierzbno developed into a suburban residential neighbourhood with numerous villas and tenements being built to the east of Independence Avenue. The tenements were also built in the area of Puławska Street. This included the Scarab Beetle House, a historic modernist villa built in 1934 at 101 Puławska Street, as a residence of the deputy mayor of Warsaw, Władysław Malinowski.

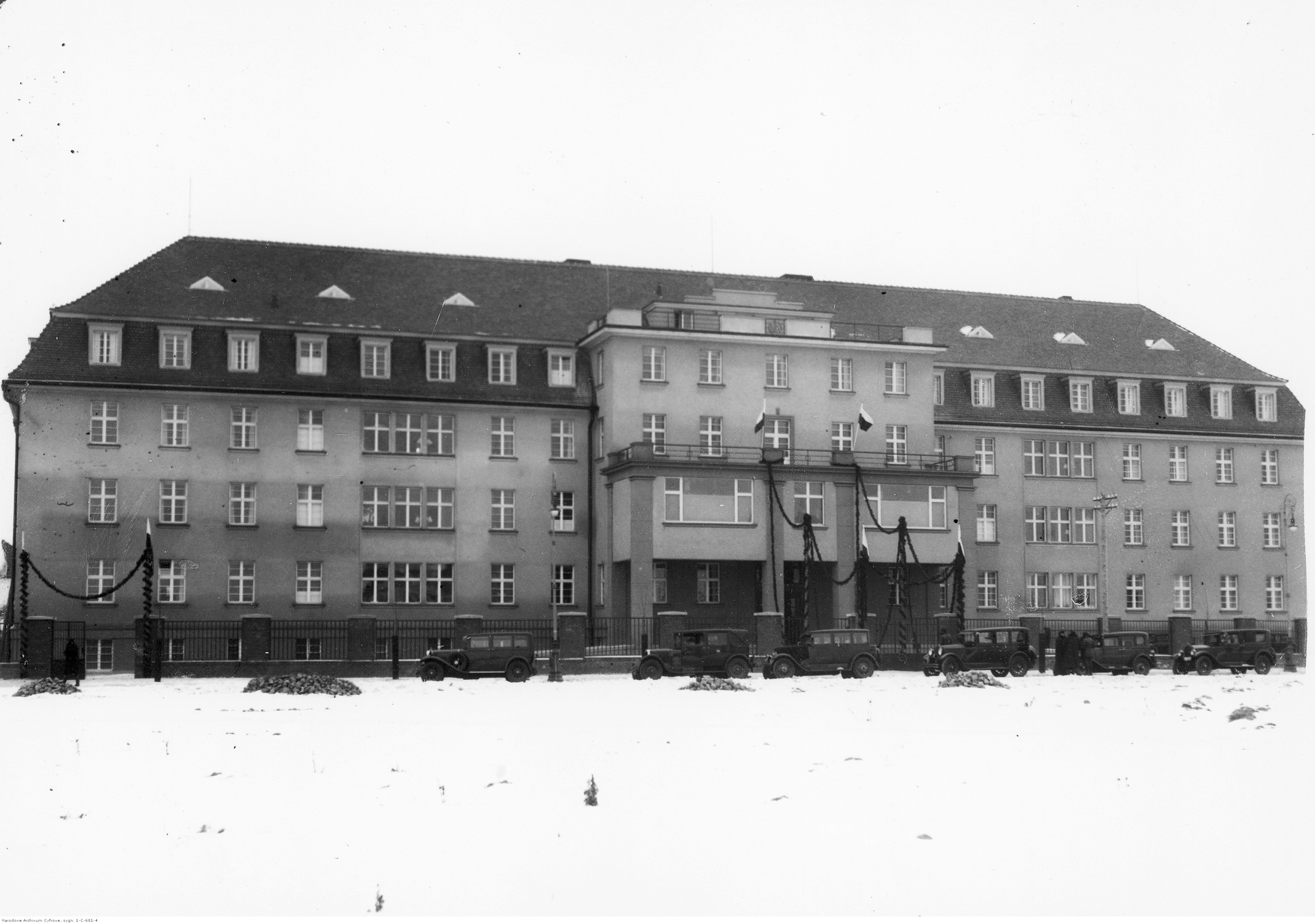
The St. Elizabeth Hospital in 1931.

In 1931, the St. Elizabeth Hospital (originally known as St. Anthony Hospital), operated by the institute of Sisters of Saint Elizabeth, was opened at 1 Goszczyńskiego Street. The building was destroyed during the Second World War, and rebuilt between 1946 and 1948. In 1949, it was nationalized. In 1993, the legal ownership of the building was returned to the Sisters of Saint Elizabeth, with the agreement that the building would operate until 2003, as the state medical institution, with them ultimately regaining the facility in 2006. In 2024, it was aquared by Luxmed private hospital network company.

In 1938, the Dreszer Park was opened between Ursynowska Street, Puławska Street, Odyńca Street, and Independence Avenue. It was designed by Zygmunt Hellwig in the modernist style. In 1944, during the Warsaw Uprising in the Second World War, the park become a defensive point of the Home Army insurgents, who predominantly belonged to the Baszta Regiment Group. Their positions were attacked by the German Army from the north between 2 and 13 August 1944, and from the south, between 25 and 27 September 1944. During the conflict the park was also used as a provisional cemetery, both for the fallen Polish resistance fighters and the civilian casualties. After the end of the conflict, the bodies were exhumated and relocated to the permanent cemeteries. The park was restored and reopened in 1951. The western portion of the park, separated by Krasickiego Street, was detached from the rest, forming the Second Jordan Garden, one of the Jordan gardens in the city, the urban green spaces dedicated as the recreational and play areas for children and youth.

In 1944, the Roman Catholic order of Discalced Carmelites founded a monastery on Czeczota Street. It was destroyed the same year by the German officers during the Warsaw Uprising. Another monastery was founded nearby on Ursynowska Street in 1947. Currently, if forms the headquarters of the Warsaw Province of the Most Holy Trinity, one of the two provinces of Discalced Carmelites in Poland.

Between 1954 and 1962, Warszawianka sports complex was built in the area of Merliniego Stree on the Warsaw Escarpment. Among its amenities, it included an association football pitch and tennis courts. Between 1960 and 1973, the complex was expanded with outdoor and indoor swimming pools. Since its opening, it served as the home field of the KS Warszawianka sports team. The complex was designed by architects Jerzy Sołtan and Zbigniew Ihnatowicz. It had degraded over the following decades, with its sections becoming abandoned and disused. In the 1990s, the new indoor swimming pool complex was opened. The old outdoor swimming pools were demolished, and overbuilt with a residential area.

In 1957, the headquarters building of the Polish Radio, a national public-service radio broadcasting organisation, was opened at 77 and 85 Independence Avenue. Originally, it was used as a broadcasting station of its international auditions. In 1958, it became the headquarters and main broadcasting station of Polish Radio.

Between 1956 and 1968, the housing estate of Wierzbno was developed between Odyńca Street, Independence Avenue, Woronicza Street, and Wołoska Street. It consisted of apartment buildings, developed using the large panel system technique, and was envisioned to house 23,000 people. The housing estate was designed by Zofia Fafiusowa, Jerzy Stanisławski, Kazimierz Stasiniewicz, and Andrzej Wochna.

In 1961, the tramline tracks were built alongside Wołoska and Woronicza Streets.

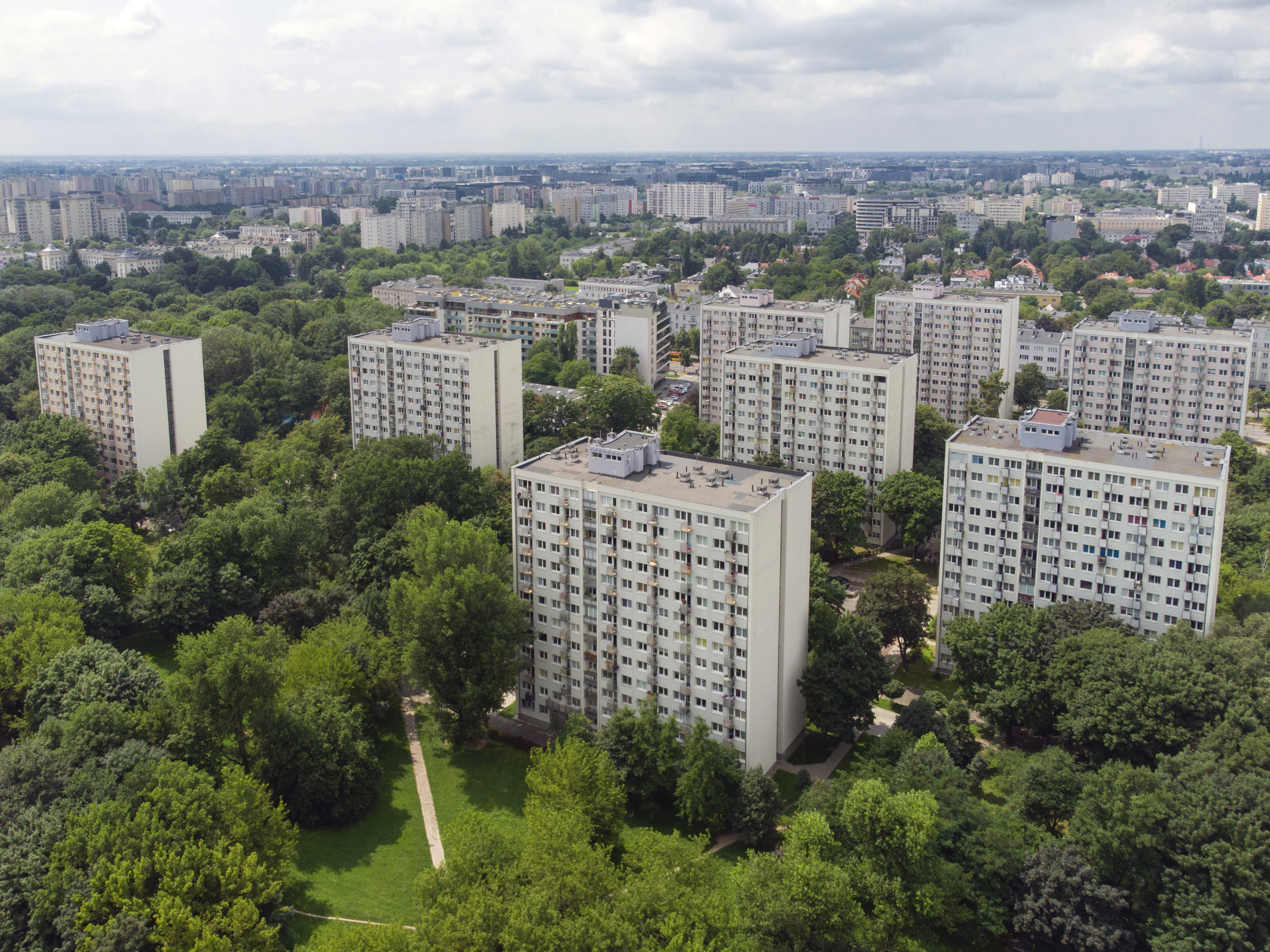
The housing estate of Skarpa Puławska between 1965 and 1971.

Between 1965 and 1971, the housing estate of Skarpa Puławska was developed between Puławska Street, Bielawska Street, Żywnego Street, and the Warsaw Escarpment. It consisted of eight 13-storey apartment buildings. They were planned to house between 4 and 5 thousand people in total. Skarpa Puławska was one of the first neighbourhoods in Poland developed using the large panel system technique, and were the tallest buildings in the country constructed with said technology.

Between 1968 and 1970, the Arcadia Park was developed on the garden area surrounding the Rabbit House palace, between Puławska Street, Żywnego Street, Piaseczyńska Street, and Idzikowskiego Street. It was designed by Longin Majdecki.

Between 1987 and 2000, the Madonna of Angels Church was built at 98A Modzelewskiego Street. It became seat of a Roman Catholic parish founded in 1983, operated by the Order of Friars Minor.

In 1993, the Interdisciplinary Centre for Mathematical and Computational Modelling, a supercomputing and research data centre of the University of Warsaw was founded, with its administrative headquarters located at 15 and 17 Tyniecka Street, and the supercomputers being housed in the building at 32 Kupiecka Street in the Białołęka district.

On 7 April 1995, two stations of the M1 line of the Warsaw Metro underground rapid transit system, were opened in Old Mokotów. They were the Racławicka station, located at the intersection of Racławicka Street, Wiktorska Street, and Independence Avenue, and Wierzbno station, located at the intersection of Woronicza Street, Independence Avenue, and Naruszewicza Street.

On 4 October 1996, the Mokotów district was subdivided into twelve City Information System areas, with Wierzbno becoming one of them.

On 17 July 2014, the administrative neighbourhood of Wierzbno was established, as a subdivision of the Mokotów district, governed by an elected neighbourhood council. Its boundaries are marked by Racławicka Street, Independence Avenue, and Ursynowska Street, Puławska Street, Woronicza Street, and Wołoska Street. It is governed by an elected neighbourhood council.

== Housing ==
Wierzbno is a residential area consisting of mid-rise apartment buildings and single-family houses. In the west, it features the housing estate of Wierzbno, located between Odyńca Street, Independence Avenue, Woronicza Street, and Wołoska Street. It consists of mid-rise apartment buildings, most of which were developed between 1956 and 1968. The neighbourhood also includes area predominantly consisting of single-family detached homes, located between Racławicka Street, Puławska Street, Woronicza Street, and Independence Avenue. It also includes tenements placed alongside Puławska Street and Independence Avenue. Many of them date to the 1920s and 1930s. In the southeast, Wierzbno also includes the housing estate of Skarpa Puławksa, located between Puławska Street, Bielawska Street, Żywnego Street, and the Warsaw Escarpment. It consists of eight 13-storey apartment buildings, developed between 1965 and 1971.

== Science, higher education, and healthcare ==
The building at 15 and 17 Tyniecka Street in Wierzbno houses a few scientific and educational institutions. This includes the administrative headquarters of the Interdisciplinary Centre for Mathematical and Computational Modelling, a supercomputing and research data centre of the University of Warsaw. Its supercomputers are housed in the building at 32 Kupiecka Street in the Białołęka district. The building at Tynicka Street also houses the School of Education of the Polish–American Freedom Foundation and the University of Warsaw, which, jointly operated by both organisations, is a graduate school for teachers.

The neighbourhood also includes the Luxmed St. Elizabeth Hospital, located at 1 Goszczyńskiego Street, which forms one of the largest private hospitals in Poland.

== Culture ==
Wierzbno includes the headquarters building of Polish Radio, a national public-service radio broadcasting organisation, located at 77 and 85 Independence Avenue. It also features the historic buildings such as the Fanshawe Palace, a neoclassical residence dating to around 1850, located at 107A Puławska Street, and the Saint Michael the Archangel Church, a Roman Catholic parish church built between 1950 and 1966. The Scarab Beetle House, a historic modernist villa, dating to 1934, is located at 101 Puławska Street.

== Parks and recreation ==
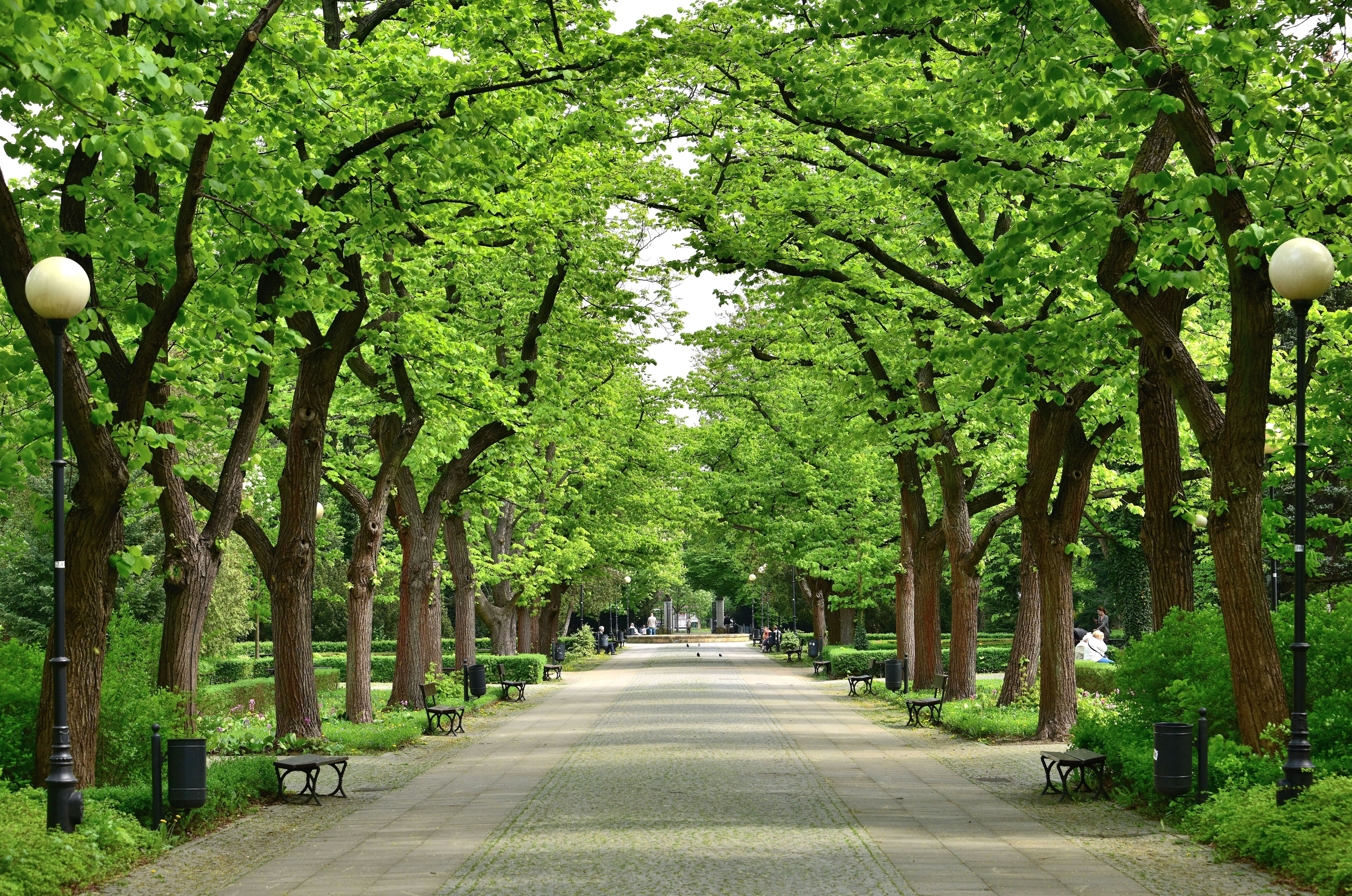
The Dreszer Park.

Wierzbno features the Dreszer Park, located between Ursynowska Street, Puławska Street, Odyńca Street, and Krasickiego Street. To it west, it borders the Second Jordan Garden, one of the Jordan gardens in the city, which form the urban green spaces dedicated as the recreational and play areas for children and youth. It is located between Ursynowska Street, Odyńca Street, Krasickiego Street, and Independence Avenue. To the east, the park also borders the Olga and Andrzej Małkowski Square, a garden square located at the corner of Puławska and Okolska Streets. In the southeast, the neighbourhood also features the northwestern portion of the Arcadia Park, known as the Upper Arcadia. The park is located between Puławska Street, Żywnego Street, Piaseczyńska Street, and Idzikowskiego Street, and next to the gardens of the Rabbit House palace.

Wierzbno also includes the Warszawianka sports complex, located on Merliniego Street, on the Warsaw Escarpment. Its amenities include tennis courts, association football pitches, and an indoor swimming pool complex. It also houses the KS Warszawianka sports team.

== Religion ==
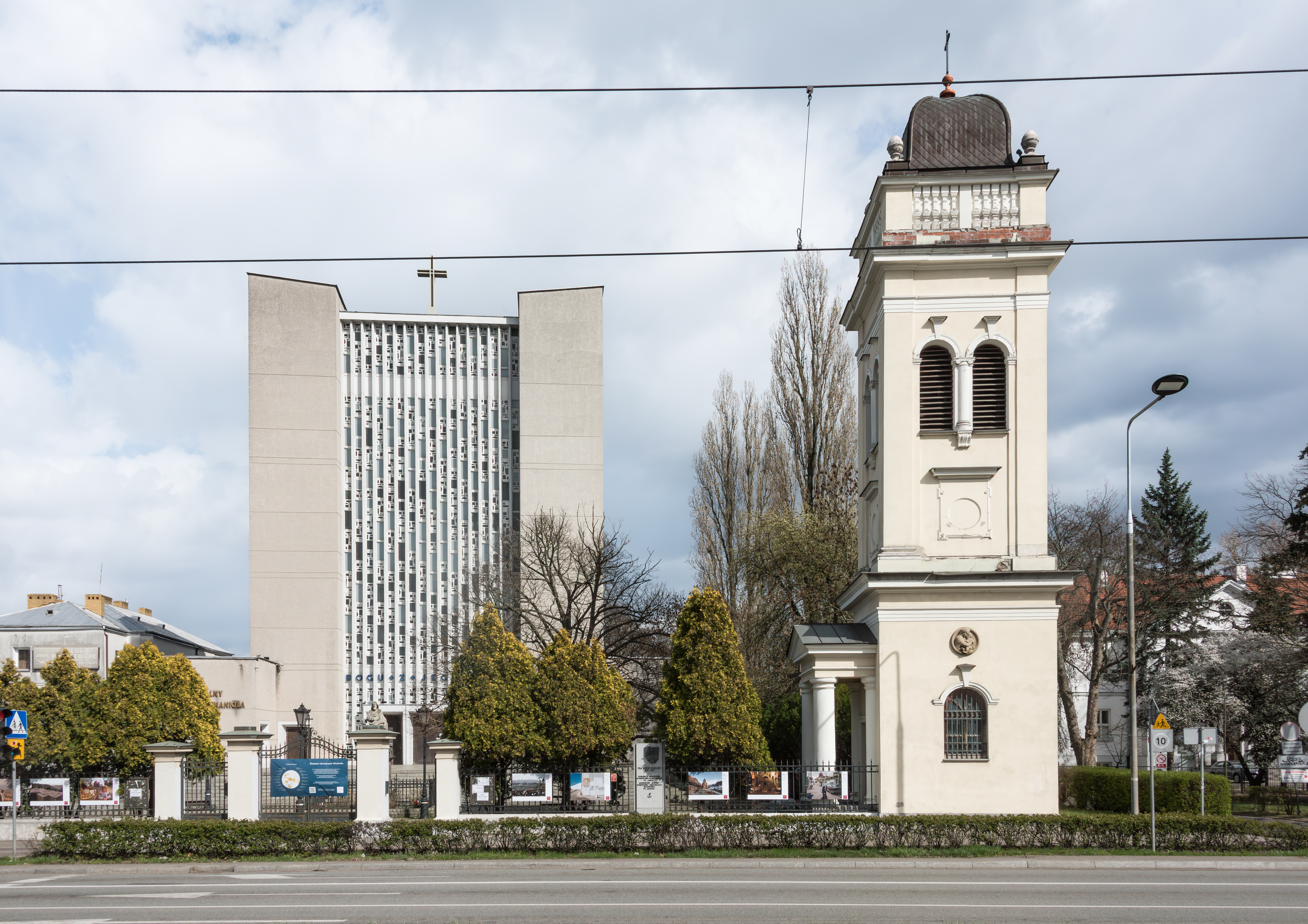
The Saint Michael the Archangel Church.

Wierzbno features two Roman Catholic parish churches. They are the Saint Michael the Archangel Church, located at 95 Puławska Street, which was built between 1950 and 1966, and the Madonna of Angels Church, located at 98A Modzelewskiego Street, which is operated by the Order of Friars Minor, and was built between 1987 and 2000. The neighbourhood also includes the St. Joseph Monastery of the Roman Catholic mendicant order of Discalced Carmelites. The building is also the headquarters of the Warsaw Province of the Most Holy Trinity, one of the two provinces of Discalced Carmelites in Poland.

== Transport ==
Wierzbno includes two stations of the M1 line of the Warsaw Metro underground rapid transit system. They are the Racławicka station, located at the intersection of Racławicka Street, Wiktorska Street, and Independence Avenue, and Wierzbno station, located at the intersection of Woronicza Street, Independence Avenue, and Naruszewicza Street. The neighbourhood also features tracks of the tram network. They are placed alongside Wołoska Street to the west, Woronicza Street to the south, and Puławska Street to the east.

== Boundaries and subdivisions ==
Wierzbno is a City Information System area in Warsaw, located in the central western portion of the Mokotów district, within the subregion of Upper Mokotów. Its boundaries are approximately determined to the north by Racławicka Street, and Dolna Street; to the east by the Warsaw Escarpment, and around the area of the Warszawianka sports complex; to the south by Woronicza Street; and to the west by Wołoska Street. The neighbourhood borders Old Mokotów to the north, Sielce to the east, Ksawerów to the south, Służewiec to the south-west, and Wyględów to the west.

The area also features a administrative subdivision in form of the neighbourhood of Wierzbno, which is governed by an elected neighbourhood council. Its seat is located at 44A Woronicza Street. It is located between Racławicka Street, Independence Avenue, Ursynowska Street, Puławska Street, Woronicza Street, and Wołoska Street.
