= Królikarnia (neighbourhood) =

Neighbourhood in Warsaw, Poland

- Neighbourhood
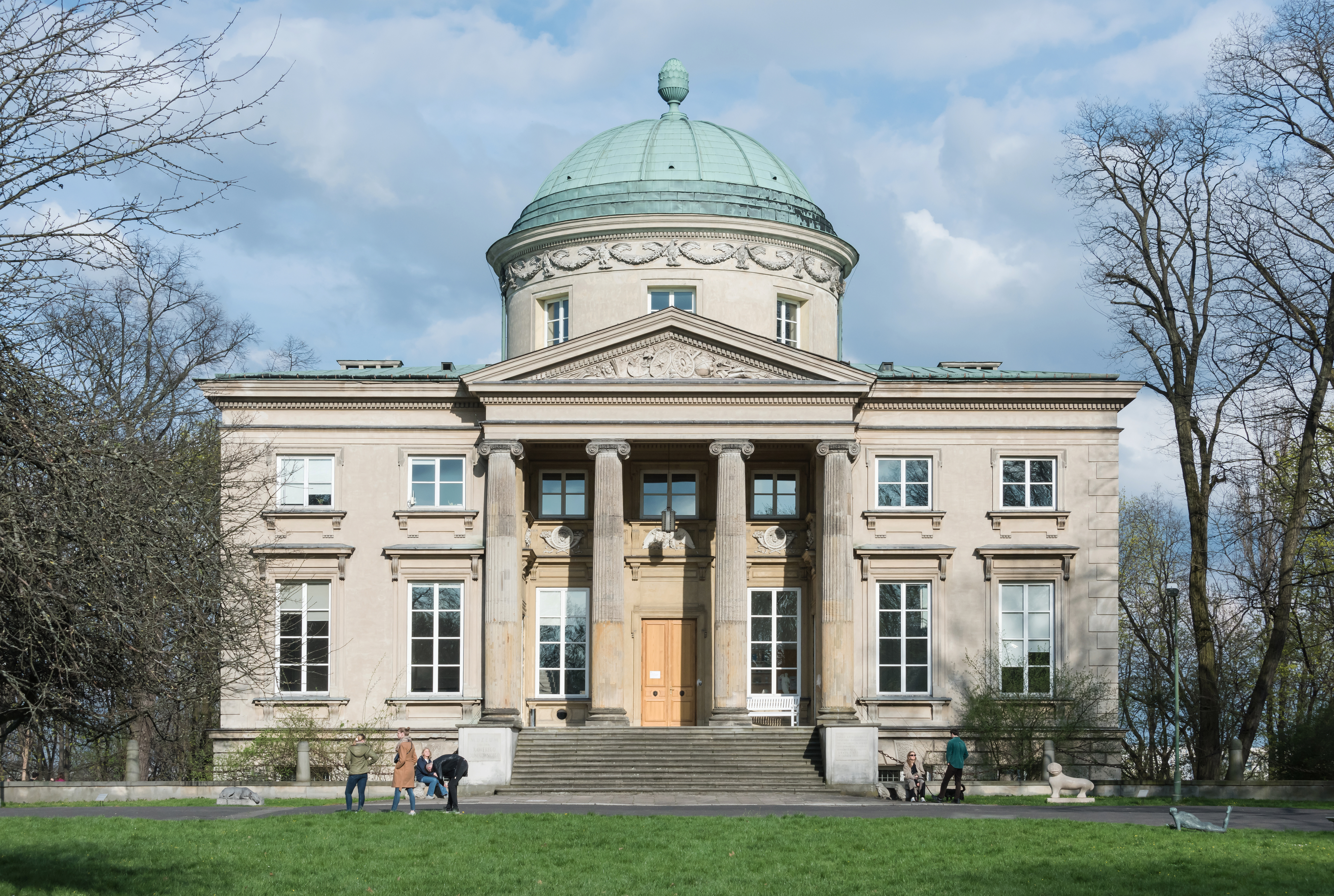
- The Rabbit House, a historical neoclassical palace residence dating to 1786.
- Interactive map of Królikarnia
- Coordinates: 52°11′20.4″N 21°01′42.5″E
- Country: Poland
- Voivodeship: Masovian
- City county: Warsaw
- District: Mokotów
- Subdistricts: Lower Mokotów; Upper Mokotów
- CIS areas: Ksawerów; Stegny
- Time zone: UTC+1 (CET)
  - Summer (DST): UTC+2 (CEST)
- Area code: +48 22

Królikarnia (Polish: [kru.liˈkar.ɲa]) is a neighbourhood in the city of Warsaw, Poland, within the Mokotów district. It is located within the City Information System areas of Ksawerów and Stegny. It is centered on Idzikowskiego Street, and placed between Puławkska Street to the west, and Imielińska Street to the east. It is a residential area with low-rise single-family housing. The area features the Rabbit House, a historical neoclassical palace residence dating to 1786, and the Arcadia Park. The village of Królikarnia was founded in the 19th century, and was incorporated into the city in 1916.

== Toponomy ==
The neighbourhood is named after the Rabbit House, a historical neoclassical palace residence dating to 1786, known in Polish as Królikarnia. It in turn was named after the rabbit husbandry which existed in its place in the early 17th century. The term translates to the word hutch, a type of cage used typically for housing domestic rabbits.

== History ==
In 1732, a pavilion, designed by Carl Friedrich Pöppelmann, was built on the Rabbit Hill, in place of a rabbit husbandry established earlier that century. The structure served as a residence and an observation deck for king Augustus II the Strong, the monarch of the Polish–Lithuanian Commonwealth, during the military exercises and exhibition, which were held from 31 July to 19 August 1732, on the nearby fields in Czerniaków. It was deconstructed around 1735.

Between 1782 and 1786, the Rabbit House (Polish: Królikarnia), a neoclassical palace residence, was built on the Rabbit Hill. It became residence of businessperon Carlo Alessandro Tomatis, and his wife, dancer Caterina Gattai Tomatis, who was a royal mistress of king Stanisław August Poniatowski. The building was designed by Domenico Merlini. In 1794, during the Kościuszko Uprising, it served as the residence of Tadeusz Kościuszko, the leader of the insurgent forces. In 1816, the building was sold to statesman Michał Hieronim Radziwiłł. In 1849, it was bought by nobleman Ksawer Pusłowski. Over time, the area developed into the village of Królikarnia, named after the palace.

On 13 January 1867, Królikarnia became part of the rural municipality of Mokotów, established as part of the administrative reform in the Kingdom of Poland. The municipality was incorporated into the city of Warsaw on 8 April 1916.

In the 1880s, the Fort Che was developed allongside the current Idzikowskiego Street, to the east of Królikarnia. It was built by the Russian Imperial Army as part of the fortifications surrounding the city, known as the Warsaw Forterss. After 1892, it began being used mostly as a warehouse, and in 1909, it was decommissioned. In the 1930s, the surrounding area to its west was parceled and sold for the construction of a neighbourhood of single-family housing, expanding Królikarnia. During the Second World War, the soldiers of the Polish Land Forces defended themselves in the fort until its capture on 25 September 1939. It was again used during the Warsaw Uprising in 1944 by the Polish resistance before being captured on 15 September.

In 1881, a tramline connecting Królikarnia with Moktów and Warsaw, was opened with tracks built alongside Puławska Street. It was first operated by a horsecar, and since 1909, by an electric tram. Since 1892, the narrow-gauge tracks were also operated by the Wilanów Railway, and since 1898, also by the Grójec Commuter Railway. In 1906, the Wierzbno station, operated by the Grójec Narrow-Gauge Railway, was opened near the current intersection of Puławska and Woronicza Streets, and near the Rabbit House palace. It operated until 1937. In 1935, the Warsaw Mokotów station, which was previously placed at the Union of Lublin Square, was moved to the intersection of Puławska and Odyńca Streets in Wierzbno, where it operated until 1938.

In September 1939, during the siege of Warsaw in the Second World War, the Rabbit House was used by the Polish Armed Forces as the defensive position against the attacking forces of the German Army. The building was destroyed during the fighting. In 1944, during the Warsaw Uprising, the divisions of the Home Army were stationed in the palace gardens. On 25 September 1944, it was the site of the heavy fighting between Polish and German soldiers. In the October 1944, the palace, together with the surrounding buildings, were burned down by German occupant forces, as part of the destruction of Warsaw.

In 1945, the Rabbit House became the property of the city of Warsaw, being confiscated from the Krasiński family, who previously owned it, via the Bierut Decree. The building was rebuilt in 1964, and a year later, the Xawery Dunikowski Museum of Sculpture was opened inside of it. It contains sculptures from the collection of the Warsaw National Museum.

Between 1968 and 1970, the Arcadia Park was developed on the garden area surrounding the Rabbit House, between Puławska Street, Żywnego Street, Piaseczyńska Street, and Idzikowskiego Street. It was designed by Longin Majdecki.

On 4 October 1996, the Mokotów district was subdivided into twelve City Information System areas, with the neighbourhood of Królikarnia being divided between Ksawerów and Stegny.

== Characteristics ==
Królikarnia is residential area with low-rise single-family housing, centered on Idzikowskiego Street, and placed between Puławska Street to the west, and Imielińska Street to the east. Its western side is placed on the Warsaw Escarpment. The area features the Rabbit House, a historical neoclassical palace residence dating to 1786, placed near Puławska Street. It houses the Xawery Dunikowski Museum of Sculpture, which is a branch of the Warsaw National Museum. Surrounding it garden forms the Sculpture Park (Polish: Park Rzeźby), which features the museal exponents. To its north, the area also includes the Arcadia Park, which includes the Arcadia pond and the Rabbit House Ponds.
