= Henryków =

Henryków may refer to the following places in Poland:

- Henryków, Lower Silesian Voivodeship (south-west Poland)
  - Cistercian Abbey of Henryków
- Henryków, Kuyavian-Pomeranian Voivodeship (north-central Poland)
- Henryków, Brzeziny County in Łódź Voivodeship (central Poland)
- Henryków, Gmina Lubochnia, Tomaszów County in Łódź Voivodeship (central Poland)
- Henryków, Zduńska Wola County in Łódź Voivodeship (central Poland)
- Henryków, Świętokrzyskie Voivodeship (south-central Poland)
- Henryków, Grójec County in Masovian Voivodeship (east-central Poland)
- Henryków, Kozienice County in Masovian Voivodeship (east-central Poland)
- Henryków, Sochaczew County in Masovian Voivodeship (east-central Poland)
- Henryków, Greater Poland Voivodeship (west-central Poland)
- Henryków, Lubusz Voivodeship (west Poland)
- Henryków, Białołęka, a neighbourhood in Warsaw, Poland, in the city district of Białołęka
- Henryków, Mokotów, a neighbourhood in Warsaw, Poland, in the city district of Mokotów
  - Fanshawe Palace (also known as Henryków Palace), a palace in Warsaw, Poland

== See also ==
- Book of Henryków, a chronicle which contains the earliest known sentence written in Polish
- Henryków Lubański
- Henryków-Urocze
- Stary Henryków
