= Skarpa Puławska =

Neighbourhood in Warsaw, Poland

- Neighbourhood
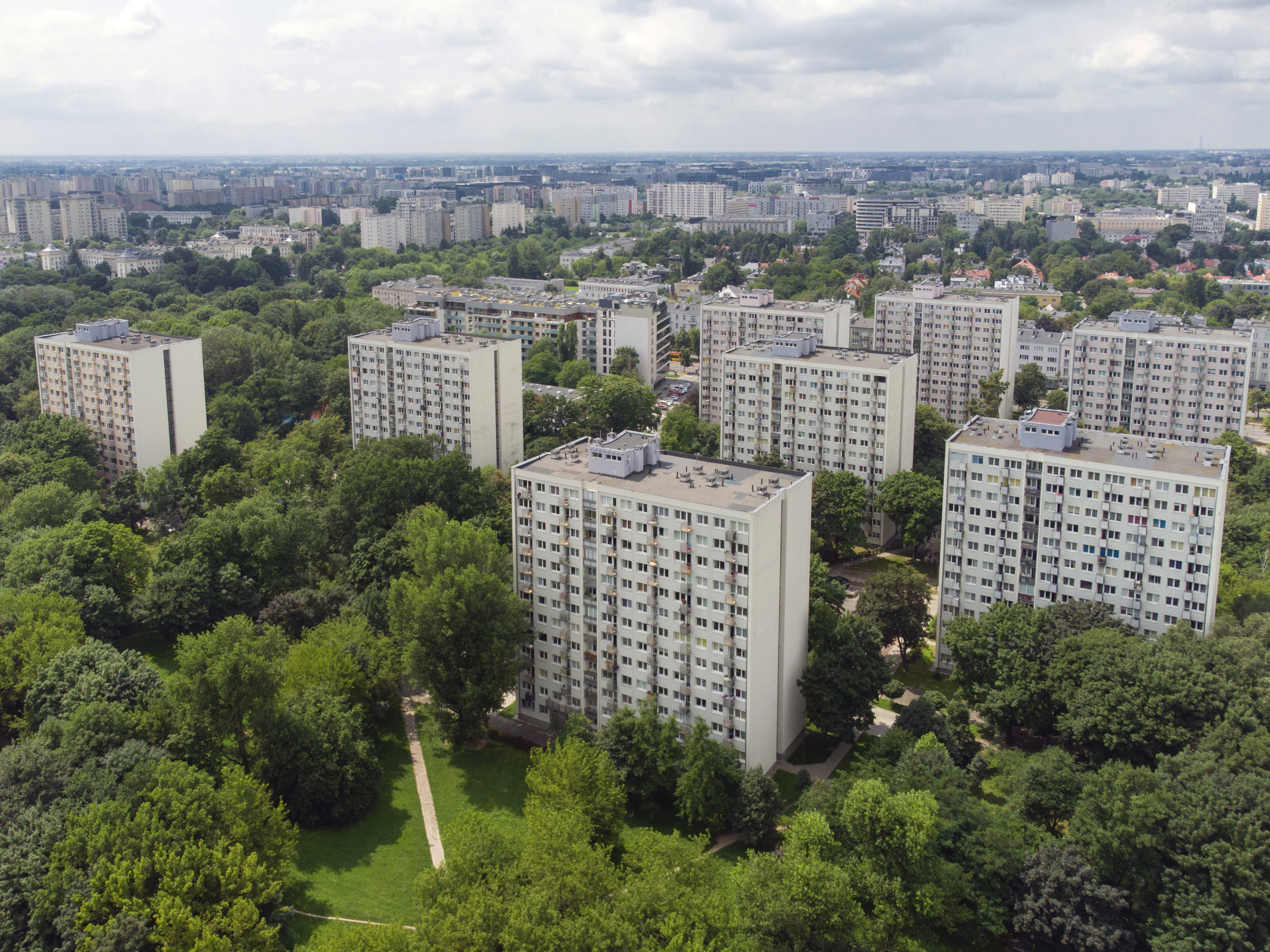
- The neighborhood of Skarpa Puławska, as seen from the east, in 2021.
- Interactive map of Skarpa Puławska
- Coordinates: 52°11′34″N 21°01′33″E
- Country: Poland
- Voivodeship: Masovian
- City county: Warsaw
- District: Mokotów
- Subdistrict: Upper Mokotów
- City Information System area: Wierzbno

Area
  - Total: 0.08 km^{2} (0.031 sq mi)
- Time zone: UTC+1 (CET)
  - Summer (DST): UTC+2 (CEST)
- Area code: +48 22

Skarpa Puławska, (Note: Polish pronunciation: [ˈskar.pa puˈwa.ˈfska]; lit. 'Puławy Escarpment', 'Puławska Street Escarpment') also known as Skarpa, (Note: Polish pronunciation: [ˈskar.pa]; lit. 'Escarpment') and Bielawska-Żywnego, (Note: Polish pronunciation: [bjɛˈlaf.ska ˈʐɨv.nɛ.ɡɔ]) is a residential neighbourhood in the city of Warsaw, Poland, in the district of Mokotów, within the City Information System area of Wierzbno. It is located between Puławska Street, Bielawska Street, Żywnego Street, the peaks of Warsaw Escarpment, and around the Warszawianka sports complex. The neighborhood consists of eight 13-storey multifamily residential large panel system-buildings.

Skarpa Puławska was built between 1965 and 1971. Upon its construction, the buildings of the neighbourhood became the tallest, and one of the first, of the large panel system-buildings in Poland.

== Name ==
The name Skarpa Puławska, translates from Polish to Puławy Escarpment. It refers to the Warsaw Escarpment, at which the neighbourhood was built, and Puławska Street, which forms one of its boundaries, and which was named after the town of Puławy, Poland. The neighbourhood is also sometimes simply known as Skarpa, which means Escarpment. The City Countil of Warsaw refers to the neighbourhood as Bielawska-Żywnego, which refers to Bielawska Street, and Żywnego Street, on which are located most of the buildings in the neighbourhood.

== Characteristics ==
The neighborhood is located between Puławska Street, Bielawska Street, Żywnego Street, the peaks of Warsaw Escarpment, and around the Warszawianka sports complex, within an area of 8 hectares (0.08 km^{2} or 0.03 sq mi).

The neighborhood consists of eight 13-storey multifamily residential large panel system-buildings, and a technical and administrative building. The residential buildings have around 1500 apartments, and can house between 4,000 and 5,000 people. They total area of apartments is equal of 50,000 m^{2} (538,195.5 sq ft). The apartments have small balconies.

The addresses of the residential buildings are: 1 Bielawska Street, 109B, and 111 Puławska Street, and 12, 16, 18, 21A, and 23 Żywnego Street. The neighbourhood is administrated by Mokotów Housing Cooperative (Polish: Spółdzielnia Mieszkaniowa „Mokotów”).

To the east from the neighbourhood are located Arcadia Park, and Arcadia pond.

== History ==
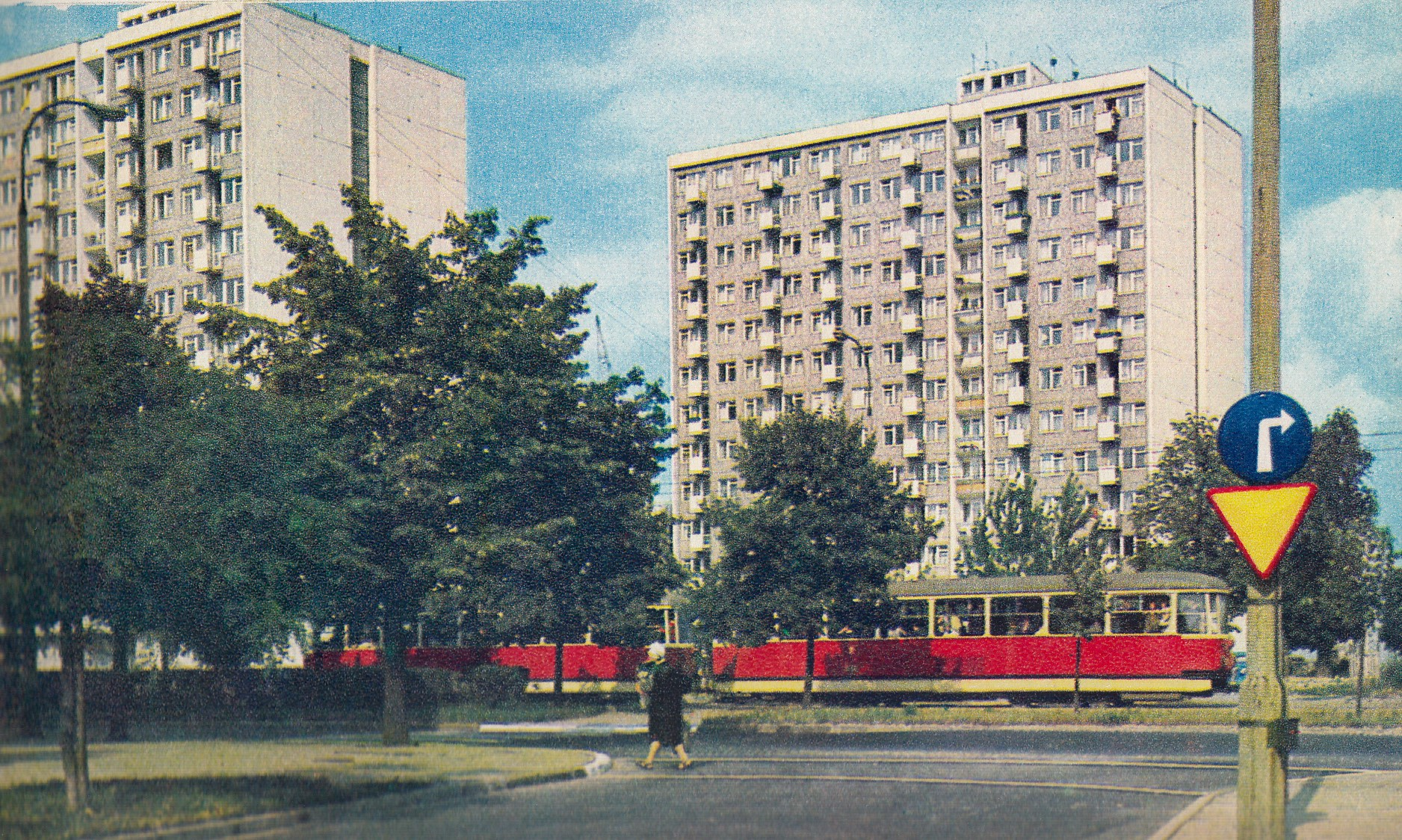
The large panel system-buildings of the neighbourhood of Skarpa Puławska, as seen from Puławska Street, in the 1960s.

The neighbourhood of was Skarpa Puławska was constructed between 1965 and 1971. The project investor was Starówka Inter-Enterprise Housing Cooperative (Polish: Międzyzakładowa Spółdzielnia Mieszkaniowa „Starówka”), and it was built by PBM-Mokotów company. According to different sources, the general designer of the neighbourhood was either J. Kulesza, or Tadeusz Stefański.

There were built eight 13-storey multifamily residential large panel system-buildings, and a technical and administrative building, located on Bielawska Street, Puławska Street, and Żywnego Street. They were built in place of the houses originally built in the 19th century to house patients of the hydrotherapy facility operated between 1840 and 1866 by physician Ludwik Sauvan.

The residential buildings were built in the large panel system technology of Warsaw Universal Form (Polish: Warszawska Uniwersalna Forma, WUF). They were based on the 10-storey large panel system-buildings, built previously between 1960 and 1965, in the nearby neighbourhood of Służewiec-Prototypy. Upon their construction, the buildings in Skarpa Puławska were the tallest, and one of the first, of their kind, to be built in Poland. They were designed by Lucjan Adamczyk, Andrzej Bielobradek, Stanisław Dębiński, Władysław Sieradzki, Halina Skarżyńska, Tadeusz Stefański, Eleonora Stolarczyk, Zbigniew Pawłowski, and Jerzy Zoller, from Biuro Projektów Typowych (Standart Projects Bureau), and Studia Budownictwa Miejskiego (Urban Construction Studios). In 1967, for the project, they were awarded the 3rd Degree Award of Minister of Construction.

While designing the buildings, alternative proposition of creating 16-storey buildings instead, was considered, however it was decided against, due to higher costs related to the need of using taller tower cranes.

In the first years of its exploitation, the central heating installation of the neighbourhood, which consisted of a single pipe, turned out to be malfunctioning. The wall insulation of the apartments on the top floors of the buildings, was also untight, and had to be re-insulated.
