= Arcadia Park (Warsaw) =

Urban park in Warsaw, Poland

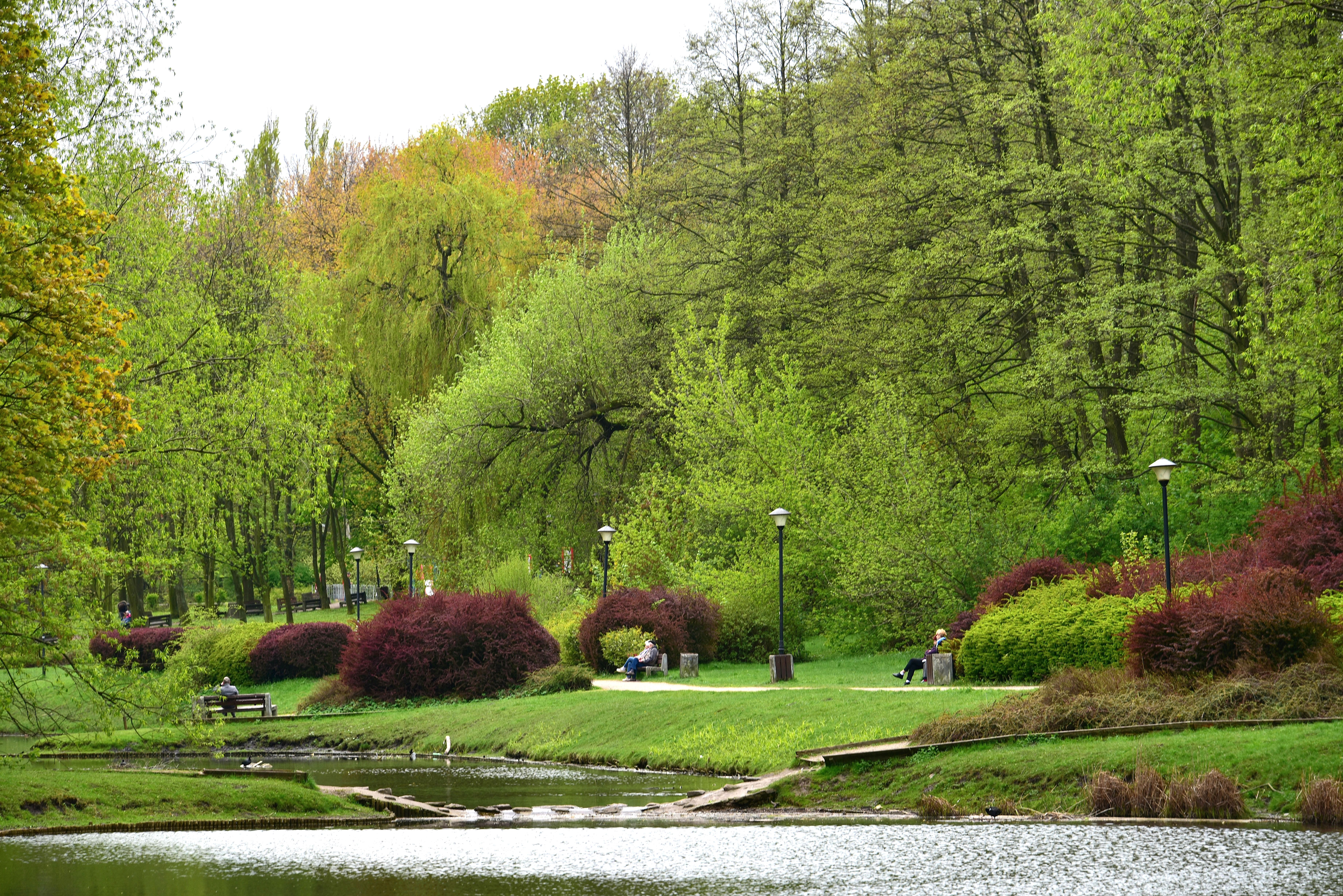
- The pond Arcadia in the park.
- Interactive map of Arcadia Park
- Type: Urban park, landscape park
- Location: Mokotów, Warsaw, Poland
- Coordinates: 52°11′25″N 21°01′43″E
- Area: 14.01 ha (34.62 acres)
- Created: 1970
- Designer: Longin Majdecki

The Arcadia Park (/ɑːrˈkeɪdiə/; Polish: Park Arkadia) is an urban and landscape park in Warsaw, Poland, within the Mokotów district. It is located between Puławska, Żywnego, Piaseczyńska, and Idzikowskiego Streets, within the neighbourhoods of Ksawerów, Sielce, and Wierzbno. To the southwest it borders the gardens of the Rabbit House, a historic neoclassical palace from 1786, which houses the Xawery Dunikowski Sculpture Museum, a branch of the Warsaw National Museum. The park was designed by Longin Majdecki, and opened in 1970, in place of a landscape garden dating to the 17th century. Characterised by its high biodiversity, it holds a status of a protected area, under the name of the Arcadia Nature and Landscape Complex (Polish: Zespół przyrodniczo-krajobrazowy „Arkadia”). It has an area of 14.01 ha (34.62 acres).

== Toponymy ==
The name of Arcadia Park (Polish: Park Arkadia) comes from the historic garden Arcadia (Polish: Park Arkadia), named and developed in the 18th century by the orders nobleman, writer, and military officer Alois Friedrich von Brühl. It in turn was named after the historic region of Arcadia on the peninsula of Peloponnese in Greece. Depicted as the domain of Pan, a virgin wilderness home to the god of the forest and his court of dryads, nymphs and other spirits of nature in the Greek mythology, the term Arcadia came to be associated with a typ of utopia characterised by bountiful natural splendor and harmony in the Renaissance literature, arts, and poetry.

== History ==
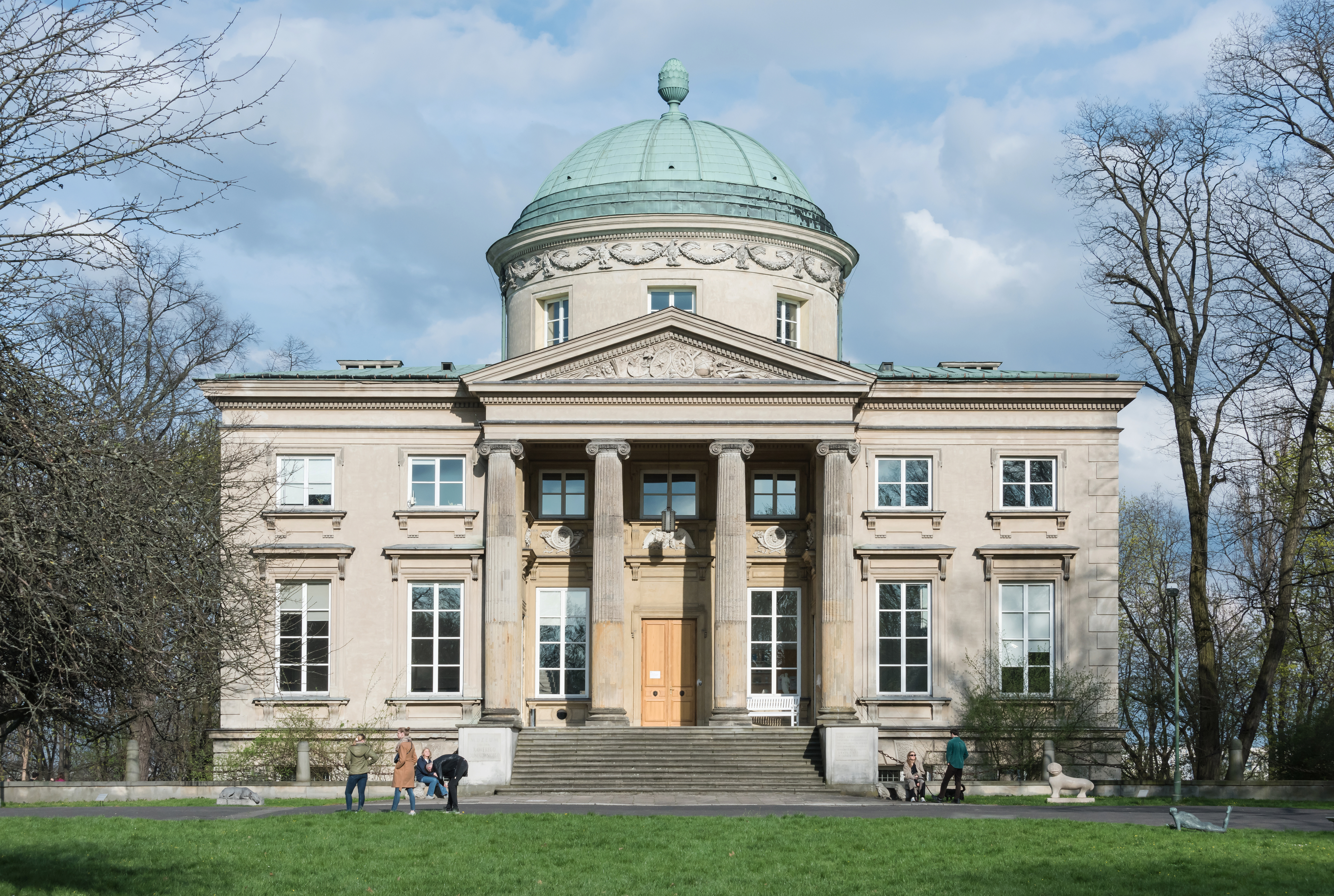
The Rabbit House, built in 1786.

In 1680, the nobleman and politician Stanisław Herakliusz Lubomirski had his manor house residence, on the foothills of the Warsaw Escarpment, located within the area of the current park. It was designed by architect Tylman van Gameren. A complex of gardens was developed around the residence. The structure did not survive to the present day. In 1720, the area was acquired by Augustus III of Poland, the monarch of the Polish–Lithuanian Commonwealth, to have its springs be used to feed the water features in the Royal Baths Park complex, via Piaseczno Ditch, dug from the pond Arcadia.

In 1732, a pavilion, designed by Carl Friedrich Pöppelmann, was built on the Rabbit Hill, on the upper side of the Warsaw Escarpment, in place of a rabbit husbandry established earlier that century. The structure served as a residence and an observation deck for king Augustus II the Strong, the monarch of the Polish–Lithuanian Commonwealth, during the military exercises and exhibition, which were held from 31 July to 19 August 1732, on the nearby fields in Czerniaków. It was deconstructed around 1735. In 1748, the land was acquired by the nobleman, writer, and military officer Alois Friedrich von Brühl, who redeveloped it into a Baroque garden, named the Arcadia (Polish: Arkadia).

Between 1782 and 1786, the Rabbit House, a neoclassical palace residence, was built on the Rabbit Hill. It became the residence of businessperson Carlo Alessandro Tomatis and his wife, dancer Caterina Gattai Tomatis, who was a royal mistress of king Stanisław August Poniatowski. The building was designed by Domenico Merlini. In 1794, during the Kościuszko Uprising, it served as the residence of Tadeusz Kościuszko, the leader of the insurgent forces. In 1816, the building was sold to statesman Michał Hieronim Radziwiłł. In 1849, it was acquired by nobleman Ksawer Pusłowski. At the end of the first half of the 19th century, the gardens surrounding the Rabbit House were redeveloped as an English landscape garden.

In September 1939, during the siege of Warsaw in the Second World War, the Rabbit House was used by the Polish Armed Forces as a defensive position against the attacking forces of the German Army. The building was destroyed during the fighting. In 1944, during the Warsaw Uprising, the divisions of the Home Army were stationed in the palace gardens. On 25 September 1944, it was the site of heavy fighting between Polish and German soldiers. In October 1944, the palace, together with the surrounding buildings, was burned down by German occupation forces, as part of the destruction of Warsaw.

In 1945, the Rabbit House became the property of the city of Warsaw, having been confiscated from the Krasiński family through the Bierut Decree. The building was rebuilt in 1964, and a year later, the Xawery Dunikowski Museum of Sculpture was opened inside it, as a branch of the Warsaw National Museum.

Between 1968 and 1970, the green public area around the Rabbit House was redeveloped into an urban park named the Arcadia Park, being designed by Longin Majdecki. The gardens surrounding the building itself remained separate forming the Sculpture Park (Polish: Park Rzeźby), which features the museal exponents.

In 2008, the park received the status of a protected area under the name of the Arcadia Nature and Landscape Complex (Polish: Zespół przyrodniczo-krajobrazowy „Arkadia”).

== Geography ==
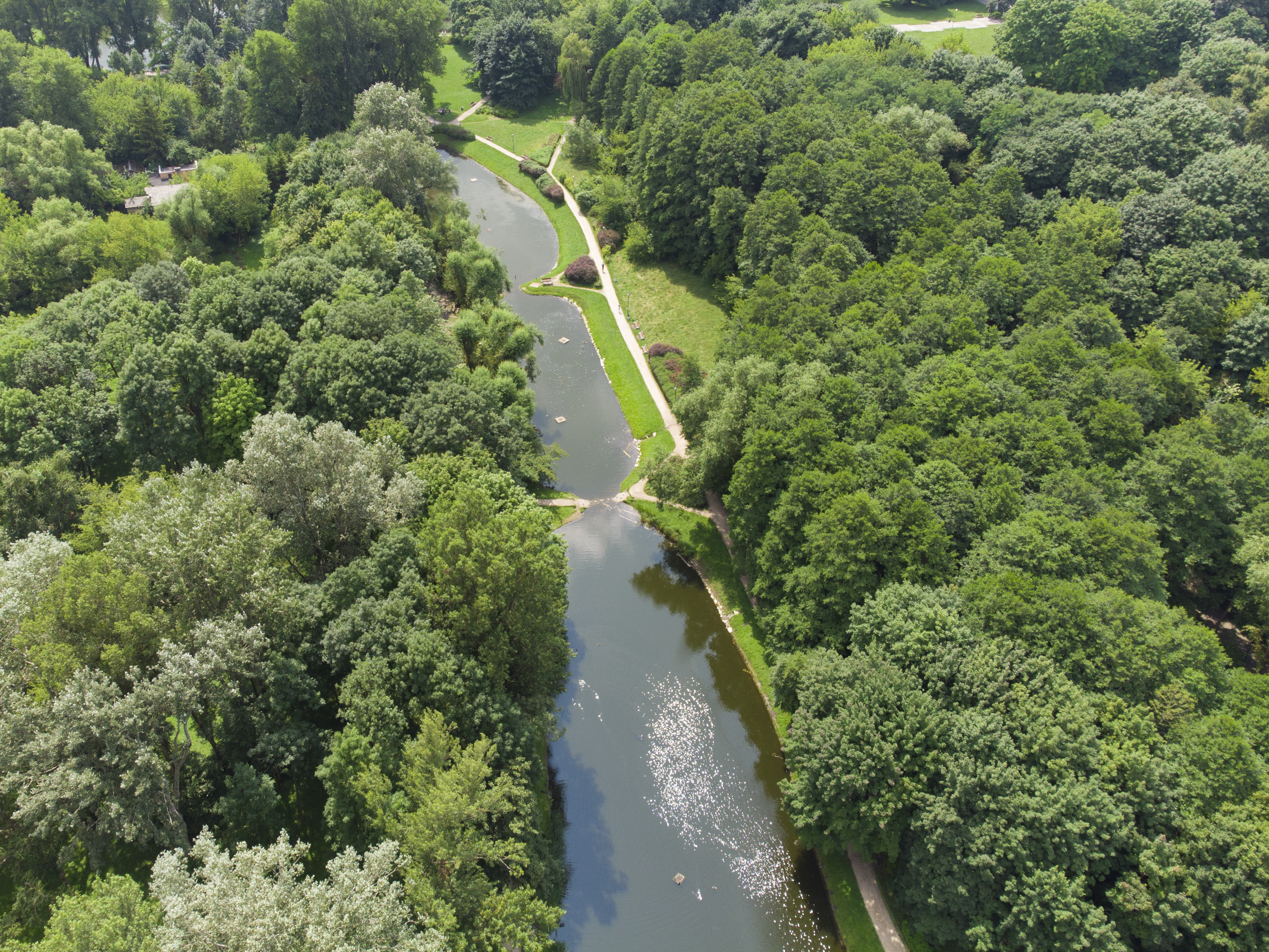
The aerial view of the pond Arcadia.

The Arcadia Park has an area of 14.01 ha (34.62 acres), and is located between Puławska, Żywnego, Piaseczyńska, and Idzikowskiego Streets, and around the gardens of the Rabbit House palace. It lies on the Warsaw Escarpment, being crossed by its peaks. The area, placed on the higher elevation, is known as Upper Arcadia (Polish: Arkadia Górna), while the area to the east, placed on the lower elevation, as Lower Arcadia (Polish: Arkadia Dolna).

The lower portion of the park features three small ponds, which started as man-made clay pits. This includes Arcadia and the Rabbit House Pond (Polish: Staw pod Królikarnią), with areas of 0.6021 ha (1.48 acres) and 0.3767 ha (0.93 acres), respectively. The latter, together with the third unnamed pond, with an area of 0.1712 ha (1.76 acres), are collectively known as the Rabbit House Ponds (Polish: Stawy pod Królikarnią). The water features in the park are fed by the springs originating from the Warsaw Escarpment. Additionally, Piaseczno Ditch, a narrow man-made water canal, flows out of the pond Arcadia to the north onto the ponds in the Royal Baths Park, from where the water is further directed through the Piaseczno Canal into the basin of the Czerniaków Port in the Vistula river.

To the southwest, the park borders the Rabbit House, a historic neoclassical palace from 1786, which houses the Xawery Dunikowski Sculpture Museum, a branch of the Warsaw National Museum. Its gardens, which remain separate from Arcadia Park, form the Sculpture Park (Polish: Park Rzeźby), which features the museal exponents. To the east, the Arcadia Park borders the garden square known as the Granat Group of the Home Army Square (Polish: Skwer Grupy AK „Granat”), located on the other side of the Puławska Street, and to the north, it borders the Warszawianka sports complex.

== Flora and fauna ==
The park has the status of a protected area under the name of the Arcadia Nature and Landscape Complex (Polish: Zespół przyrodniczo-krajobrazowy „Arkadia”). It is characterised by high biodiversity, unique in the urbanised area of Downtown Warsaw. It features both native species which sprouted out naturally, as well as those introduced by humans during the development of the park. The area is covered by the forest stand in approximately 60%, and includes over 3,500 species of broad-leaved trees. The western portion is dominated by the boxelder maple, field maple, Norway maple, small-leaved lime, and sycamore. Other popular species of trees include the black locust, Caucasian lime, European ash, European hornbeam, European white elm, horse chestnut, large-leaved lime, northern red oak, and pedunculate oak. The black locust and northern red oak are considered to be invasive species in the area. In the eastern portion, the area of the water springs at the foothills of the Warsaw Escarpment, the area is covered in an alder carr, dominated by the European black alder. The area is also dominated by the boxelder maple, field maple, Norway maple, and sycamore, with other species present including common hazel, European ash, European white elm, Japanese rowan, red-barked dogwood, Siberian elm, wild privet, and wych elm. Crack and white willows, among others, are also present near the pond Arcadia. The park also features four trees with a status of natural monuments. They are a field elm and three small-leaved limes.

The park also features numerous species of flowering shrubes, including the bird cherry, bristly locust, cherry plum, European black elderberry, and hawthorn. Several species are also present around the pond Arcadia, including the border forsythia, Chaenomeles, Deutzia crenata, false spirea, meadowsweets, old-fashioned weigela, shrubby cinquefoil, sweet mock orange, and Syringa pubescens.

Furthermore, the grass in the area of the seeps in the eastern portion of the park includes Blysmus compressus, rushes, true sedges, and watercress. Additionally, the butterbur is present in the vicinity of the Rabbit House.

The park forms a habitat of numerous species of birds, including Bohemian waxwing, common moorhen, Eurasian golden oriole, Eurasian nuthatch, Eurasian siskin, Eurasian teal, Eurasian treecreeper, European green woodpecker, European greenfinch, European robin, great reed warbler, great spotted woodpecker, hawfinch, lesser spotted woodpecker, little grebe, mallard, middle spotted woodpecker, mute swan, Syrian woodpecker, tawny owl, thrush nightingale, and tufted duck. Furthermore, the species of semi-aquatic amphibians, such as the common frog, common toad, and smooth newt, are also present in the park in the vicinity of its ponds.

== Gallery ==
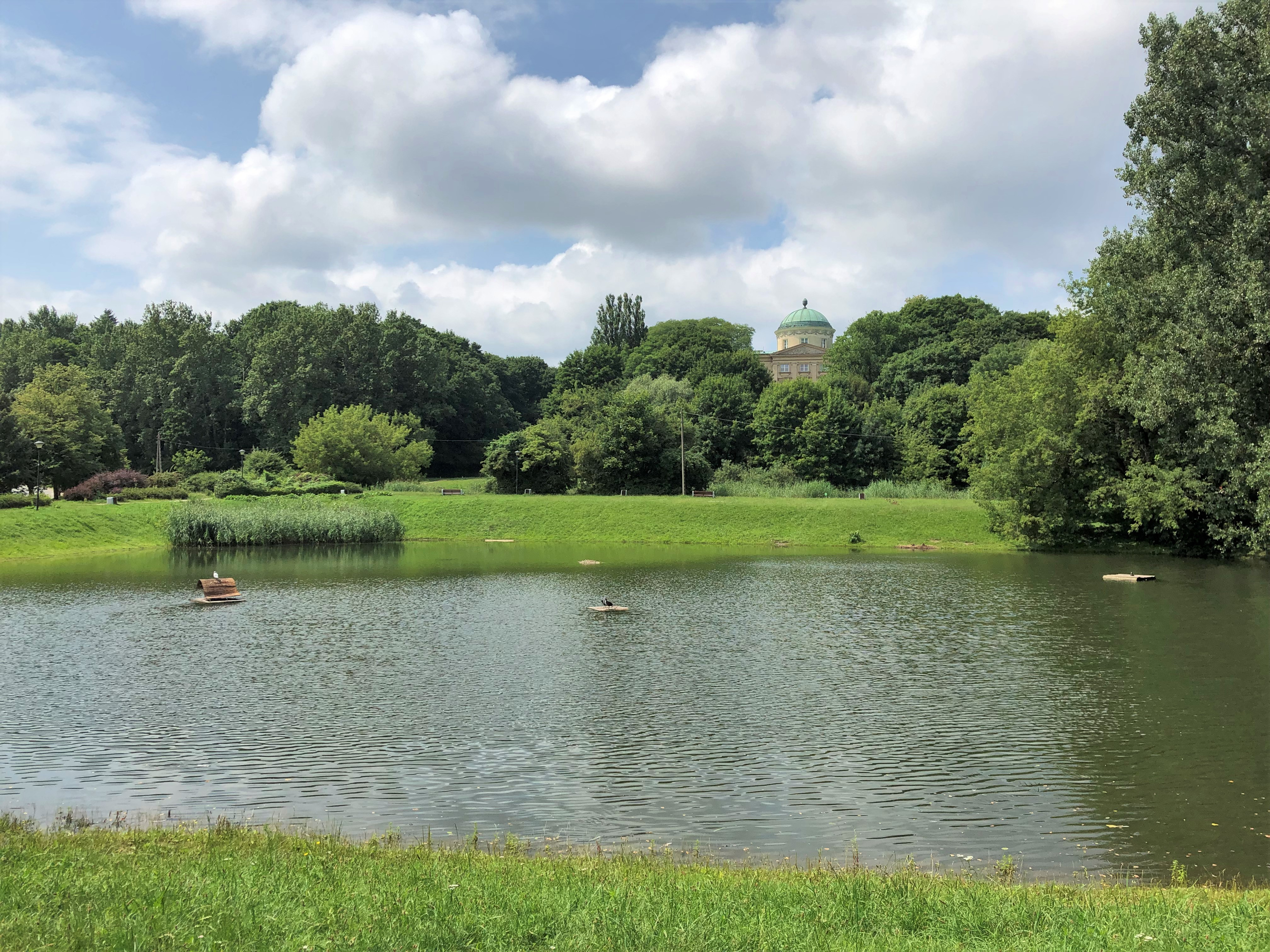
The Rabbit House Pond.

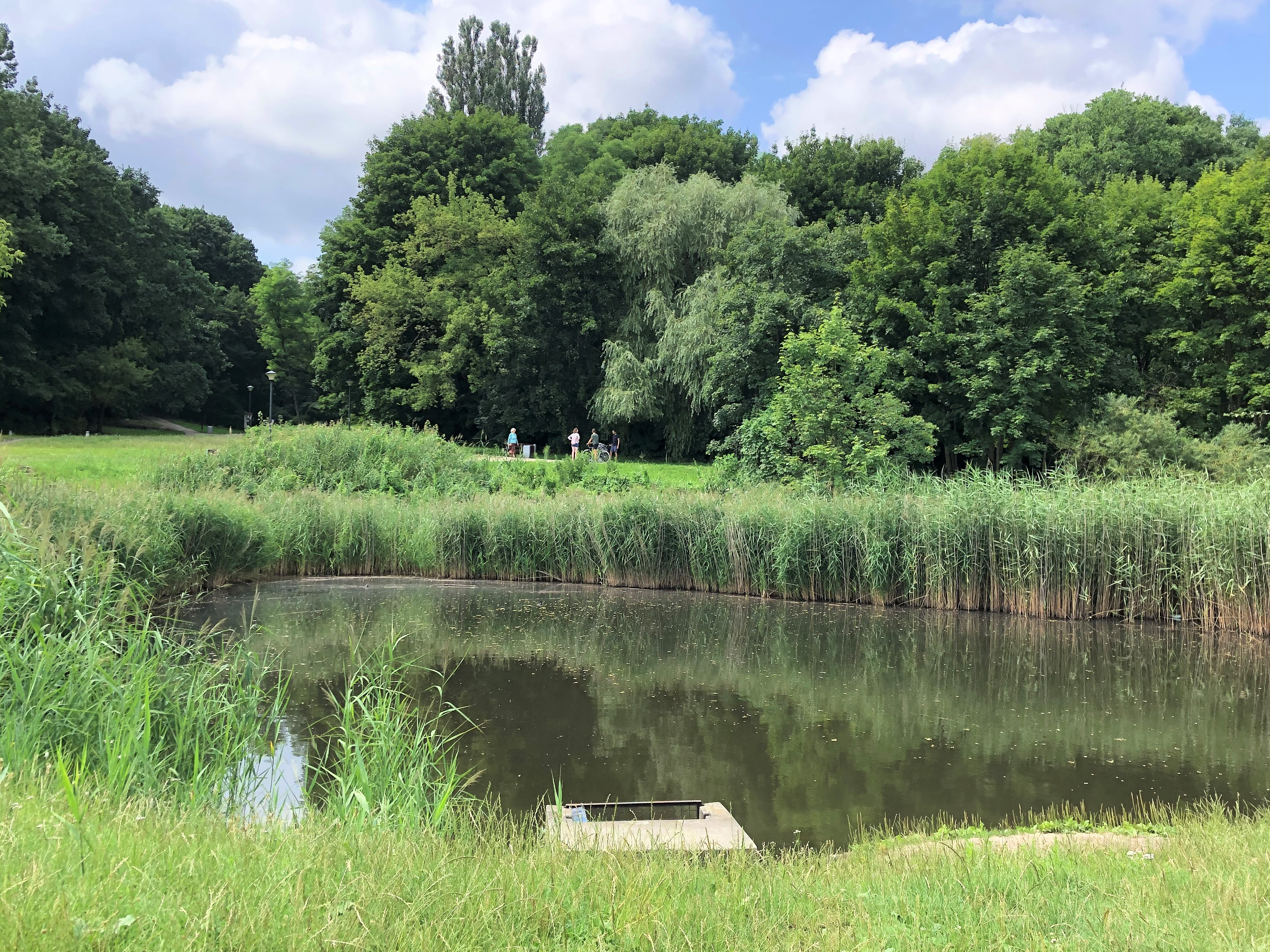
An unnamed pond in the Arcadia Park.

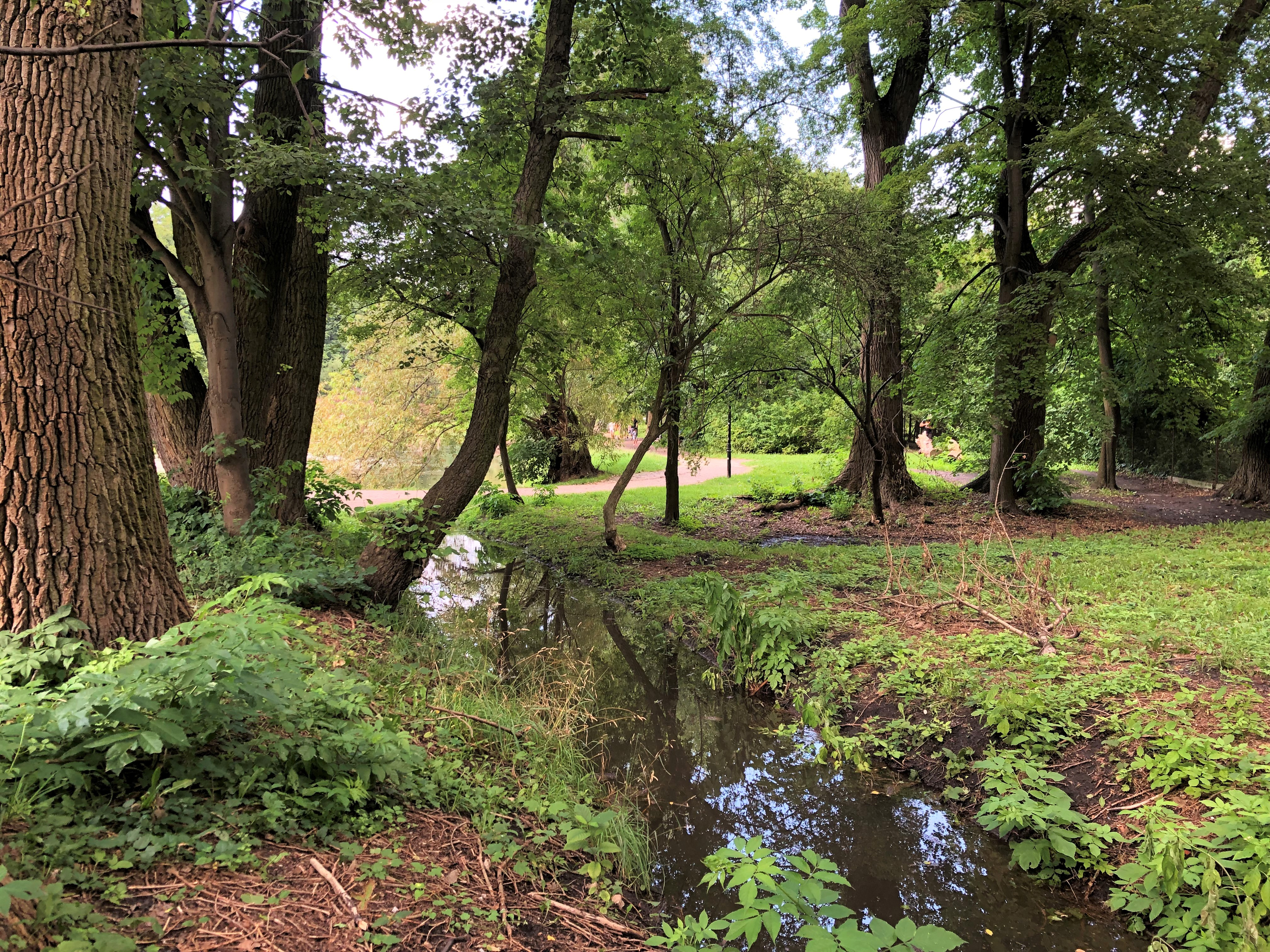
Piaseczno Ditch

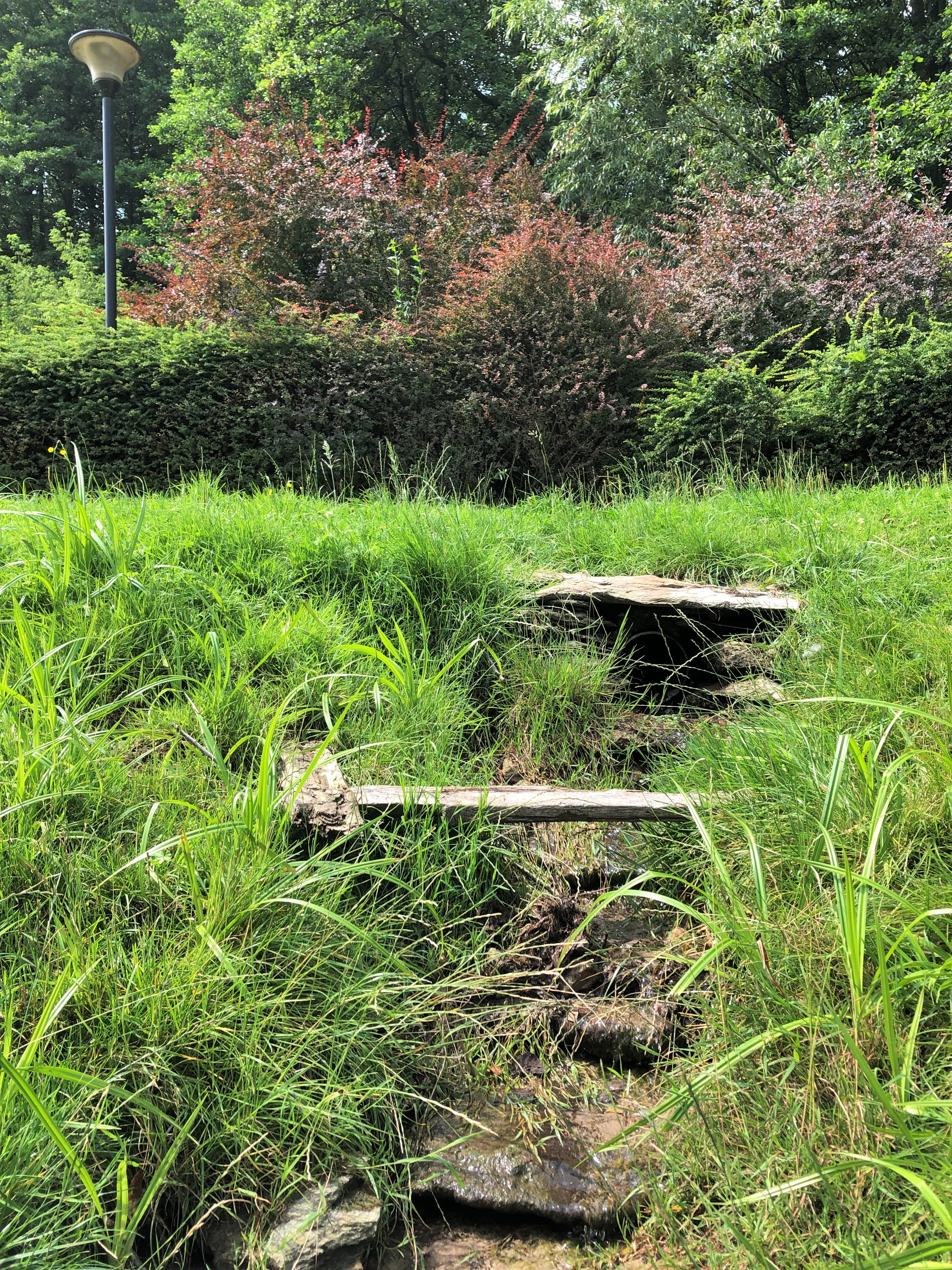
The spring which feeds the ponds in the park.
