= Gmina Mokotów =

Former municipality of Poland

- Rural municipality of Warsaw County
- 1867–1916
- Capital: Mokotów
- Area
  - Coordinates: 52°12′15″N 21°00′58″E
- Population
  - 1890: 8,708
- Government
  - Type: Rural municipality
- History
  - Established: 17 January 1867
  - Disestablished: 8 April 1916
- Contained within
  - Country: Russian Empire (1867–1915); Government General of Warsaw (1915–1916)
  - Governorate: Warsaw
  - County: Warsaw County
Preceded by	Succeeded by
Warsaw Governorate	Warsaw; Municipality of Wilanów

Gmina Mokotów (Polish: [mɔˈkɔt.uf]) was a rural municipality of Warsaw County, located in the Warsaw Governorate, with its seat of government in the village of Mokotów. Currently, the area is part of the Mokotów district within the city of Warsaw, Poland. The municipality was established on 13 January 1867, as a subdivision in the Kingdom of Poland, which was a part of the Russian Empire. During the First World War, the Warsaw Governorate begun being administrated by the Government General of Warsaw on 18 October 1915. The municipality was dissolved on 8 April 1916, being incorporated into the city of Warsaw. In 1890, the municipality had a population of 8,708 people

== History ==
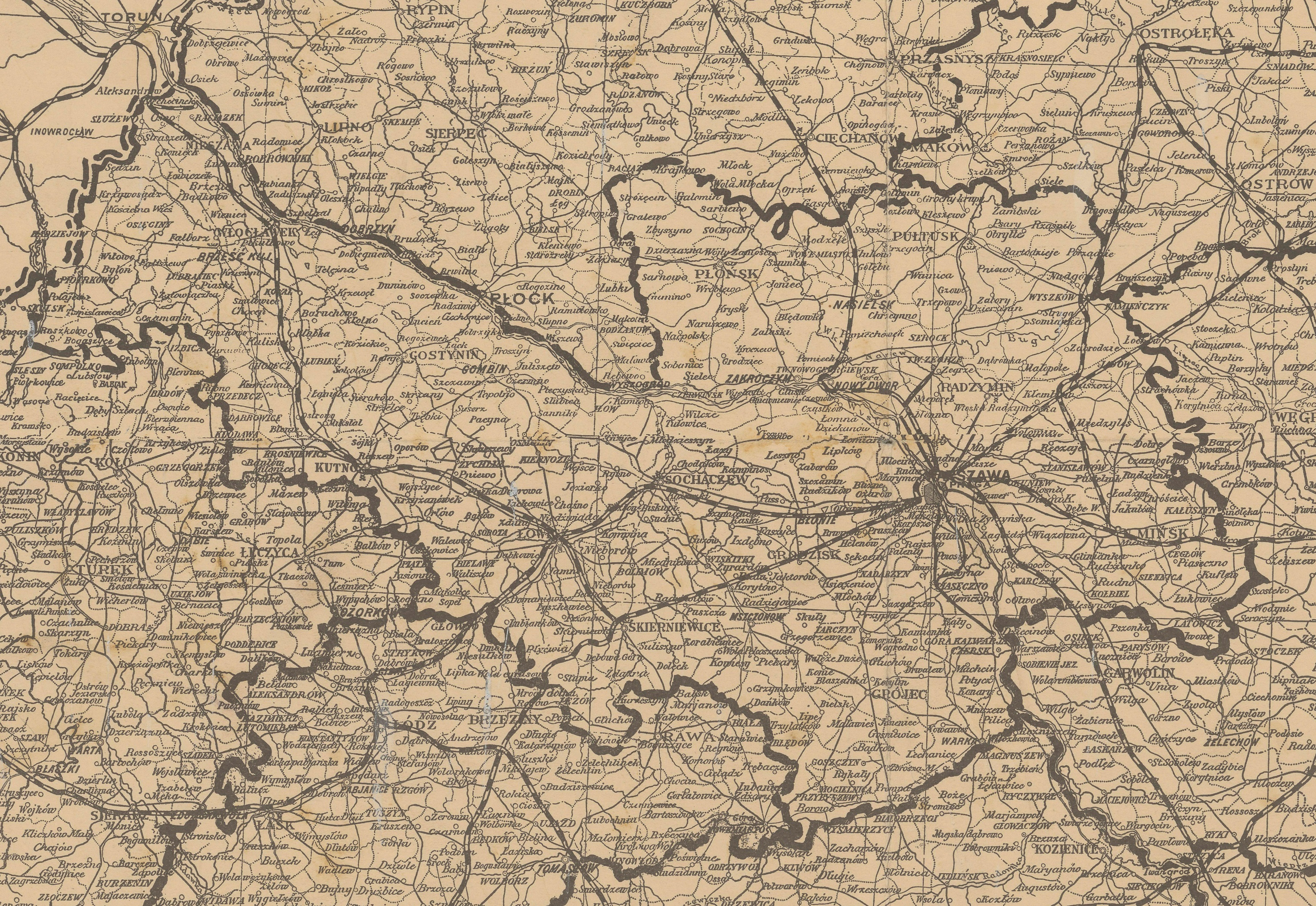
The map of the Warsaw Governorate in 1914, including the municipality of Mokotów.

The rural municipality of Mokotów was established on 13 January 1867, as part of the administrative reform in the Kingdom of Poland, which was part of the Russian Empire. The municipality was part of Warsaw County within the Warsaw Governorate. Its seat was set in the village of Mokotów. It also included the following villages: Czerniaków, Henryków, Królikarnia, Siekierki Małe, Siekierki Wielkie, Sielce, Szopy Niemieckie, Szopy Polskie, and Wierzbno. It also included the Mokotów Aerodrome. In 1890, it had a population of 8,708 people.

In 1903, the hamlet of Mokotów-Murowanka was incorporated into the city of Warsaw. The villages of Czerniaków, Szopy Polskie, Szopy Niemieckie, Siekierki Małe, and Siekierki Wielkie were transferred to the municipality of Wilanów in 1909.

After the area became occupied by the Imperial German Army during the First World War, the Warsaw Governorate begun being administrated by the Government General of Warsaw on 18 October 1915. The municipality was incorporated into the city of Warsaw on 8 April 1916, by the orders Governor-General Hans Hartwig von Beseler. The order was backdated to 1 April 1916.
