= Wierzbno metro station =

Warsaw metro station

Wierzbno
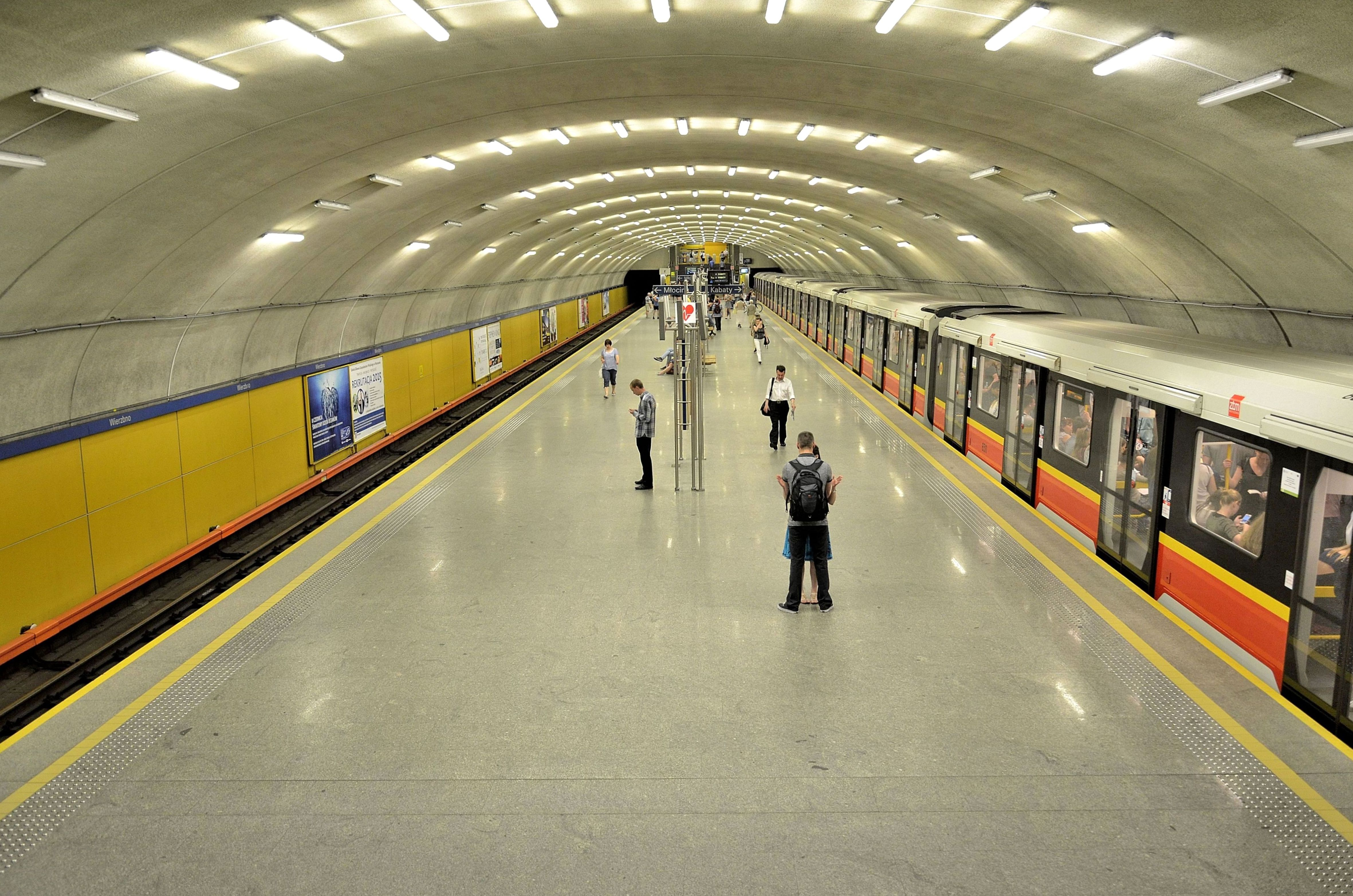

General information
- Coordinates: 52°11′23″N 21°1′0″E
- Owner: Public Transport Authority
- Platforms: 1 island platform
- Tracks: 2
- Connections: 174, 218, 308; N36; 18, 31

Construction
- Structure type: Underground
- Platform levels: 1
- Accessible: Yes

Other information
- Station code: A-8
- Fare zone: 1

History
- Opened: 7 April 1995; 31 years ago

Services
Preceding station	Warsaw Metro	Following station
Racławicka towards Młociny	M1 line	Wilanowska towards Kabaty
Location
- Location within Warsaw

Metro Wierzbno is a station on Line M1 of the Warsaw Metro, located in the Wierzbno neighbourhood, from which it derives its name. The station is in the Mokotów district of Warsaw.

The station was opened on 7 April 1995 as part of the inaugural stretch of the Warsaw Metro, between Kabaty and Politechnika.
