= Henryków, Mokotów =

Neighbourhood in Warsaw, Poland

Henryków
- Neighbourhood
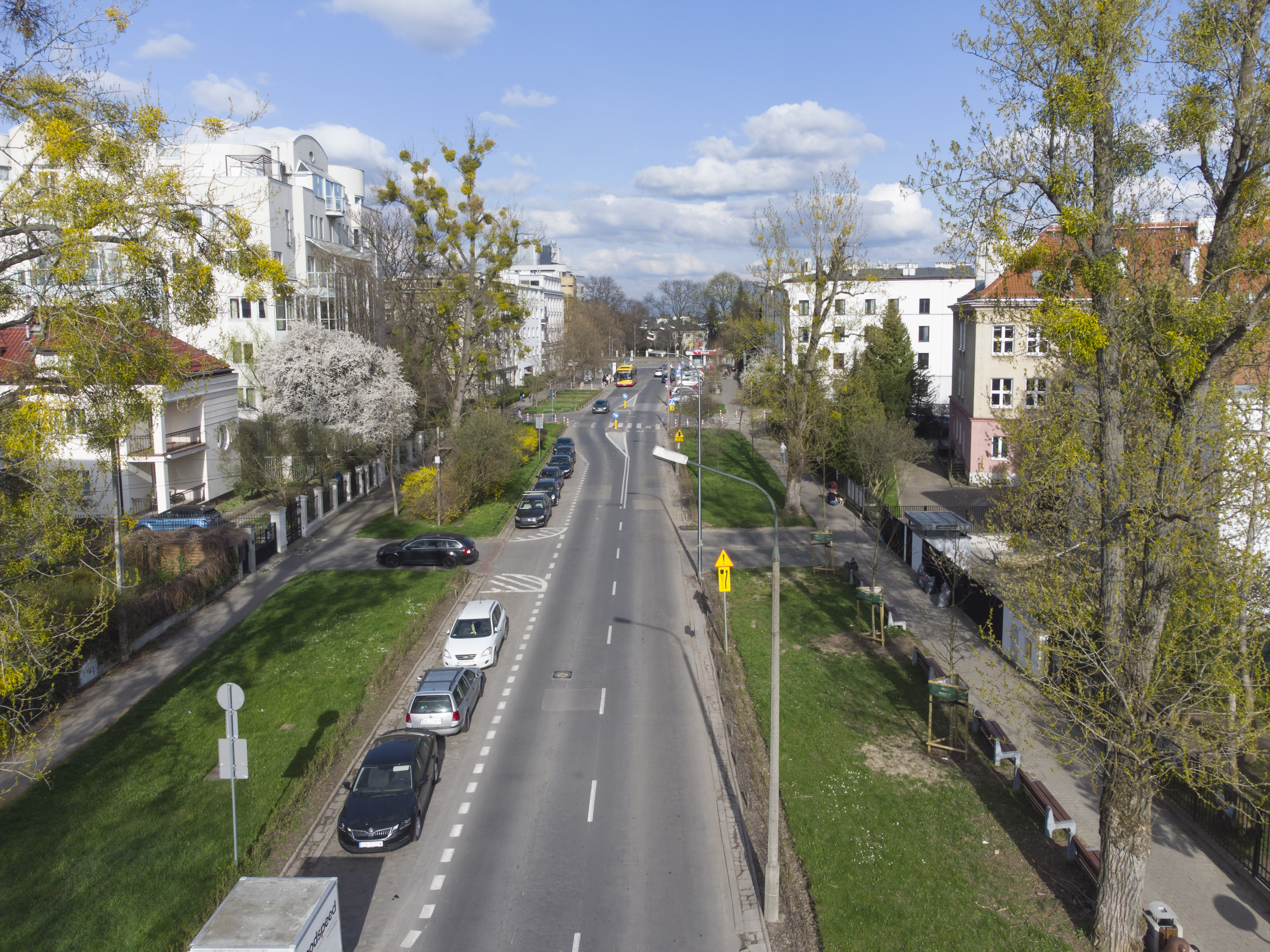
- Malczewskiego Street in Henryków, in 2023.
- Interactive map of Henryków
- Coordinates: 52°11′48″N 21°01′31″E
- Country: Poland
- Voivodeship: Masovian
- City county: Warsaw
- District: Mokotów
- Subdistrict: Upper Mokotów
- City Information System area: Wierzbno
- Municipal neighbourhood: Wierzbno
- Founded: 19th century
- Within city limits: 1916
- Time zone: UTC+1 (CET)
  - Summer (DST): UTC+2 (CEST)
- Area code: +48 22

Henryków (Polish pronunciation: [xɛnˈrɘ̟.kuf]) is a neighbourhood in the city of Warsaw, Poland, in the district of Mokotów. It is located within the City Information System area of Wierzbno, and partially within the municipal neighbourhood of Wierzbno. It is a residential area, mostly consisting of villas.

Henryków was established in the early 19th century, by Henryk Bonnet, a clerk and a judge. It was originally settled by French people. Throughout the 1920s and the 1930s, the neighbourhood went through major development, with villas being constructed within it.

== History ==
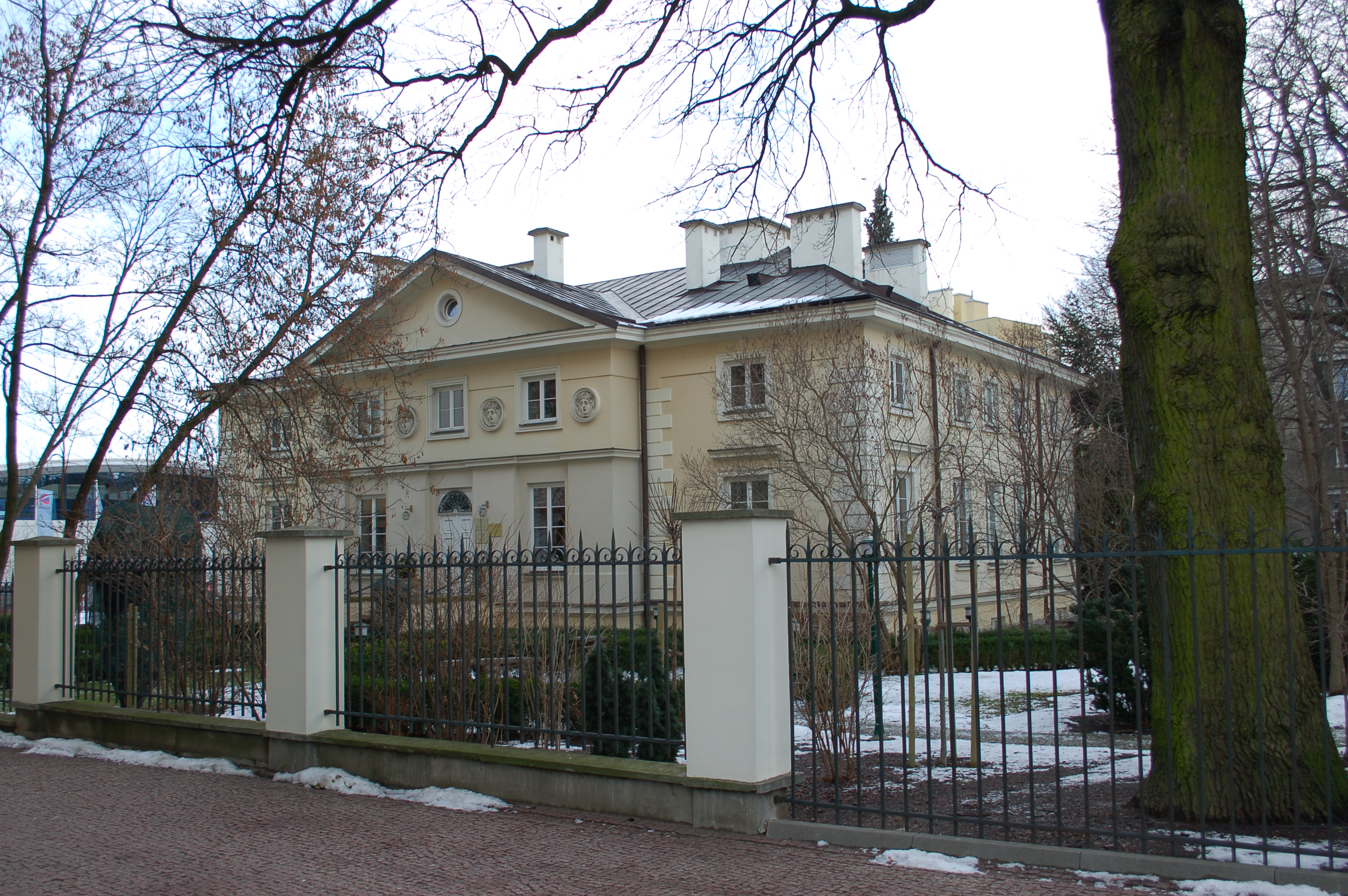
Fanshawe Palace built around 1850, as the residence of the Fanshawe family, the owners of Henryków. Photography made in 2012.

At the beginning of the 19th century, Henryk Bonnet, a French-born clerk who served as the State Councillor and the judge in the district court of Warsaw, had bought an area around current Malczewskiego Street, establishing there the folwark-type settlement of Henryków. It was originally settled by French people. In there was built a small palace residence of the Bonnet family. In 1824, Louisa Bonnet de Belon (1802-1876), Henryk Bonnet's daughter, had married George Fanshawe (1789-1867; also known as Jerzy Fanshave), English-born chamberlain and colonel in the Imperial Russian Army. The couple had inherited the property around 1830. Around 1850, in place of Bonnet's residence, at current 107A Puławska Street, was built Fanshawe Palace, which became the residence of the Fanshawe family. In 1900, the palace was inherited by nobleman August Potocki, who, while never living there himself, had accommodated there the less wealthy members of his family.

From 1867 to 1916, Henryków belonged to the gmina (municipality) of Mokotów. On 8 April 1916, Henryków, together with the rest of its municipality, were incorporated into the city of Warsaw.

Between 1920s and 1930s, in area of Henryków were built villas.

On 4 October 1996, the district of Mokotów had been subdivided into areas of the City Information System, with Henryków becoming part of the area of Wierzbno.

On 17 July 2014 was established the municipal neighbourhood of Wierzbno, which is governed by the neighbourhood council. It includes western portion of Henryków.
