= Racławicka metro station =

Warsaw metro station

Racławicka
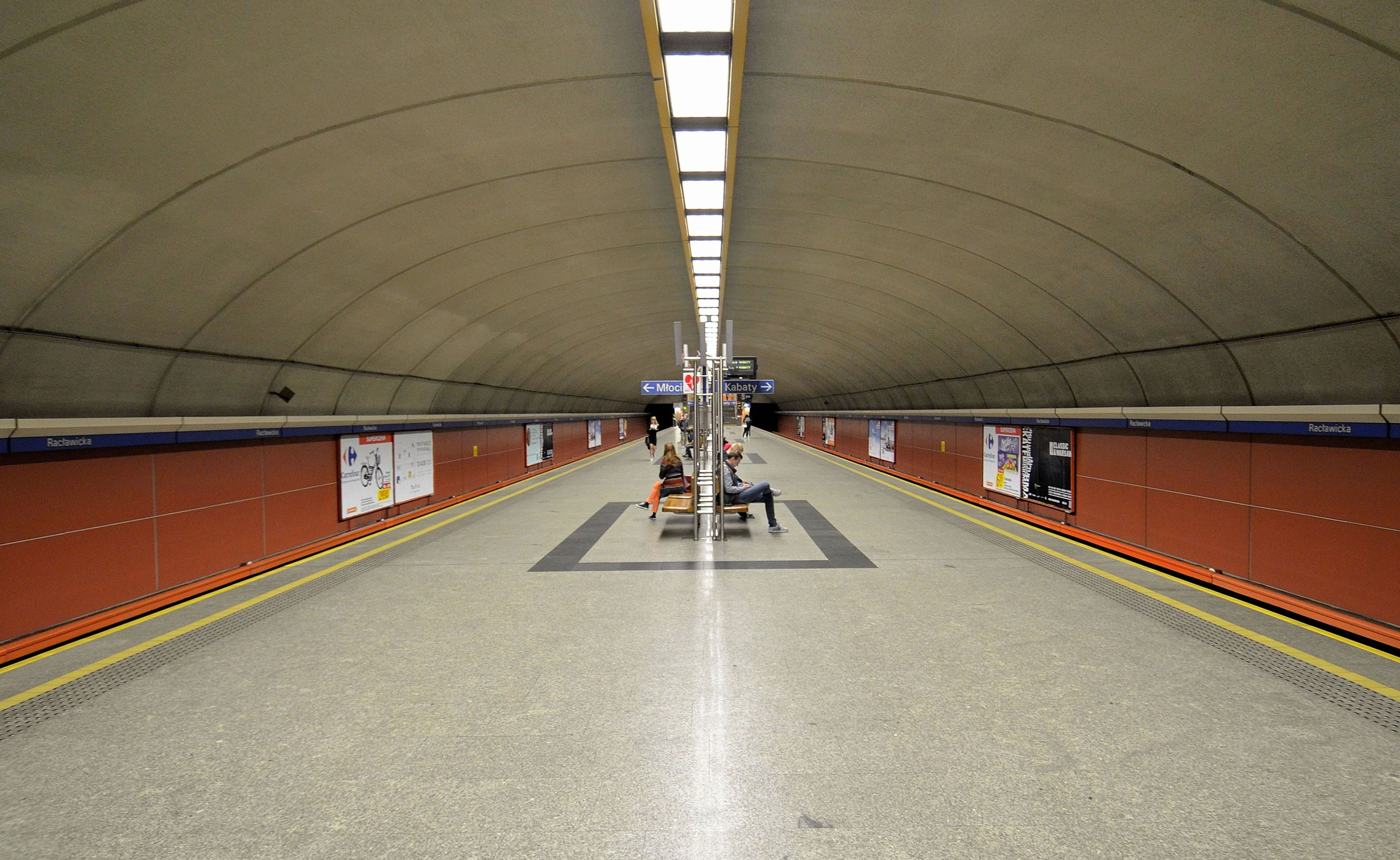

General information
- Coordinates: 52°11′55″N 21°0′44″E
- Owner: Public Transport Authority
- Platforms: 1 island platform
- Tracks: 2
- Connections: 174; N36

Construction
- Structure type: Underground
- Platform levels: 1
- Accessible: Yes

Other information
- Station code: A-9
- Fare zone: 1

History
- Opened: 7 April 1995; 31 years ago

Services
Preceding station	Warsaw Metro	Following station
Pole Mokotowskie towards Młociny	M1 line	Wierzbno towards Kabaty
Location
- Location within Warsaw

Metro Racławicka is a station on Line M1 of the Warsaw Metro. It is located in the Mokotów district of Warsaw, at the junction of ulica Racławicka (Racławicka Street) and Aleja Niepodległości (Independence Avenue).

The station was opened on 7 April 1995 as part of the inaugural stretch of the Warsaw Metro, between Kabaty and Politechnika.
