= Fanshawe Palace =

Palace in Warsaw, Poland

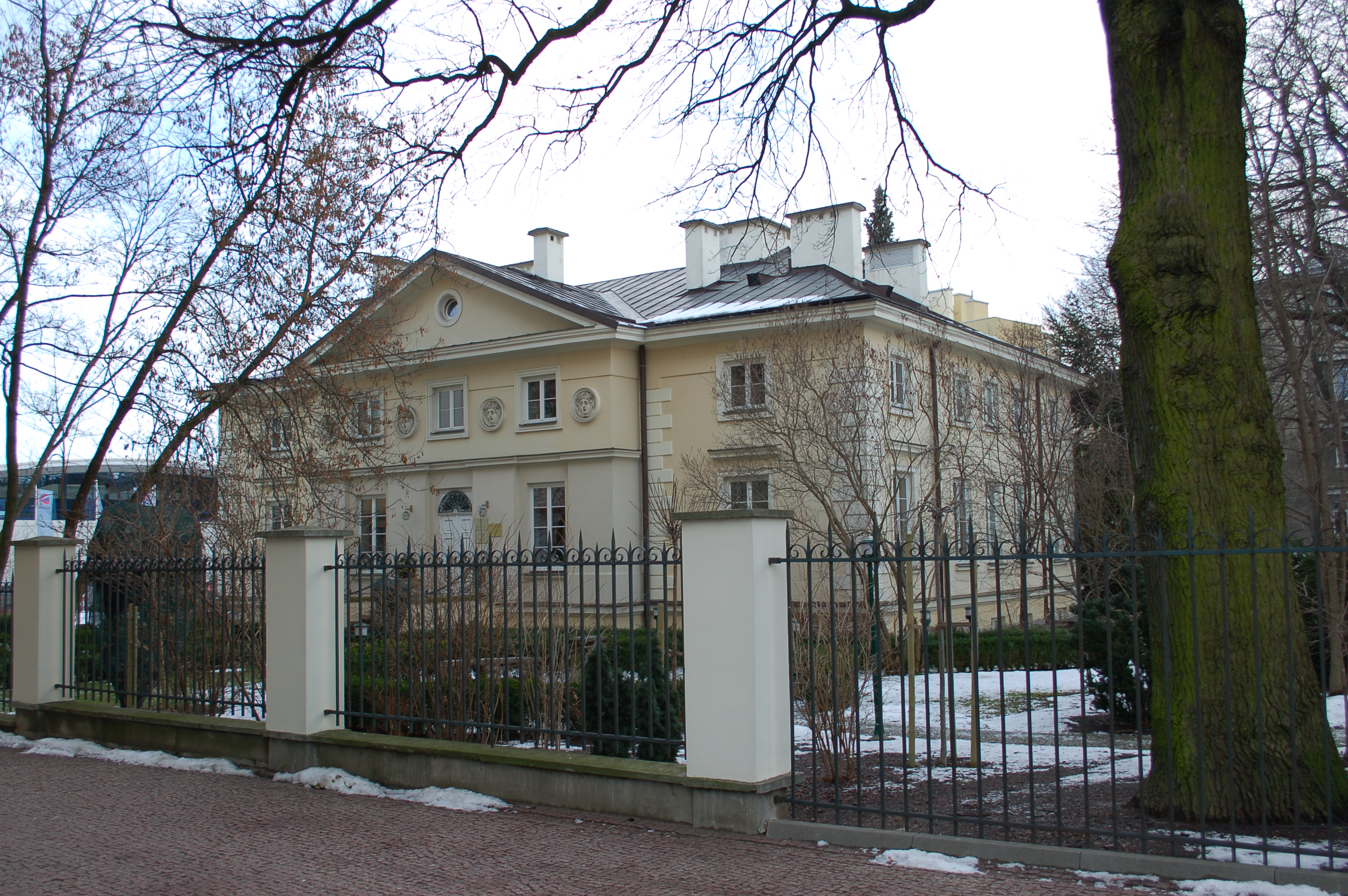
- The Fanshawe Palace in 2012.
- Interactive map of the Fanshawe Palace area

General information
- Architectural style: Neoclassical
- Location: Warsaw, Poland, 107A Puławska Street
- Coordinates: 52°11′41″N 21°01′30″E
- Completed: c. 1850

Technical details
- Floor count: 2

The Fanshawe Palace, (Note: Polish: Pałac Fanshawów) also known as the Henryków Palace (Note: Polish: Pałac Henryków, Pałac na Henrykowie, Pałacyk Henryków) is a neoclassical palace in Warsaw, Poland, located at the 107A Puławska Street. It was built around 1850 as the residence of the Fanshawe family.

== History ==
At the beginning of the 19th century, Henryk Bonnet, a French-born clerk who served as the State Councillor and the judge in the district court of Warsaw, had bought an area around current Malczewskiego Street, establishing there a small settlement of Henryków, originally, only inhabited by French population. A small palace residence of the Bonnet family was built there. In 1824, Louisa Bonnet de Belon (1802–1876), Henryk Bonnet's daughter, had married George Fanshawe (1789–1867; also known as Jerzy Fanshave), English-born chamberlain and colonel in the Imperial Russian Army. The couple had inherited the property around 1830. Around 1850, in place of Bonnet's residence, at current 107A Puławska Street, was built Fanshawe Palace, which became the residence of the Fanshawe family. Enrico Marconi is assumed to be the architect responsible for designing this palace.

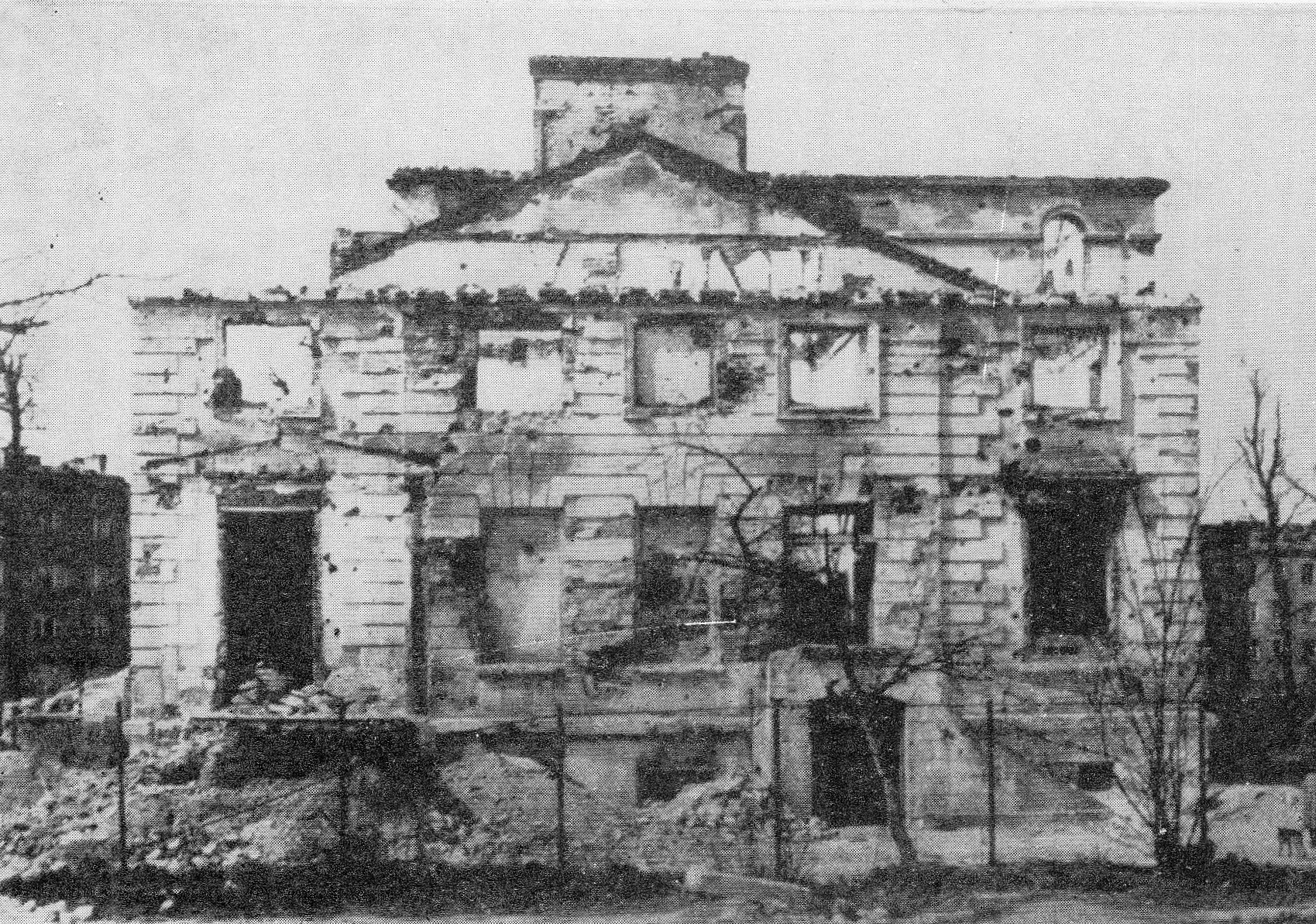
The ruins of the Fanshawe Palace in 1945, which was burned down during the Warsaw Uprising in 1944.

In 1900, the palace was inherited by nobleman August Potocki, who, while never living there himself, had accommodated there the less wealthy members of his family. After the First World War, the palace housed a children's hospital, and later accommodation for the officers of the Polish Armed Forces. During the Second World War, in the place was located the kitchen on the Central Welfare Council, a charity helping impoverished and people affected by the ongoing conflict. During the war, in palace also lived members of the Polish aristocracy who had fled the Soviet Union. During the Second World War, the upper floor and the roof of the building were damaged and the palace had burned down in 1944 during the Warsaw Uprising.

The building was reconstructed between 1951 and 1952, with the project by Stanisław Żaryn. Its interior was then designed into apartments.

In 1965, the building, together with its garden, was listed on the Registry of Cultural Property of Poland.

Currently the building is the headquarters of the Kosmetyczne Instytuty Dr Irena Eris cosmetics company.

== Characteristics ==
The Fanshawe Palace was designed in the neoclassical style. It is a two-storey building that has a rectangular floor plan of approximately 20 m × 15 m (65.6 ft × 49.2 ft). The front façade features a tondo depicting the heads of the gorgons from the Greek mythology. The top of the façade has a triangular gable. The façade from the side of the garden has the a portico with four columns, and a balcony. Inside, in the former living room is located the original fireplace.

The palace is surrounded by a garden. Among the plants growing there, is a European ash tree, which has the status of the natural monument.
