= Królikarnia =

Coordinates: 52°11′20.4″N 21°1′42.5″E

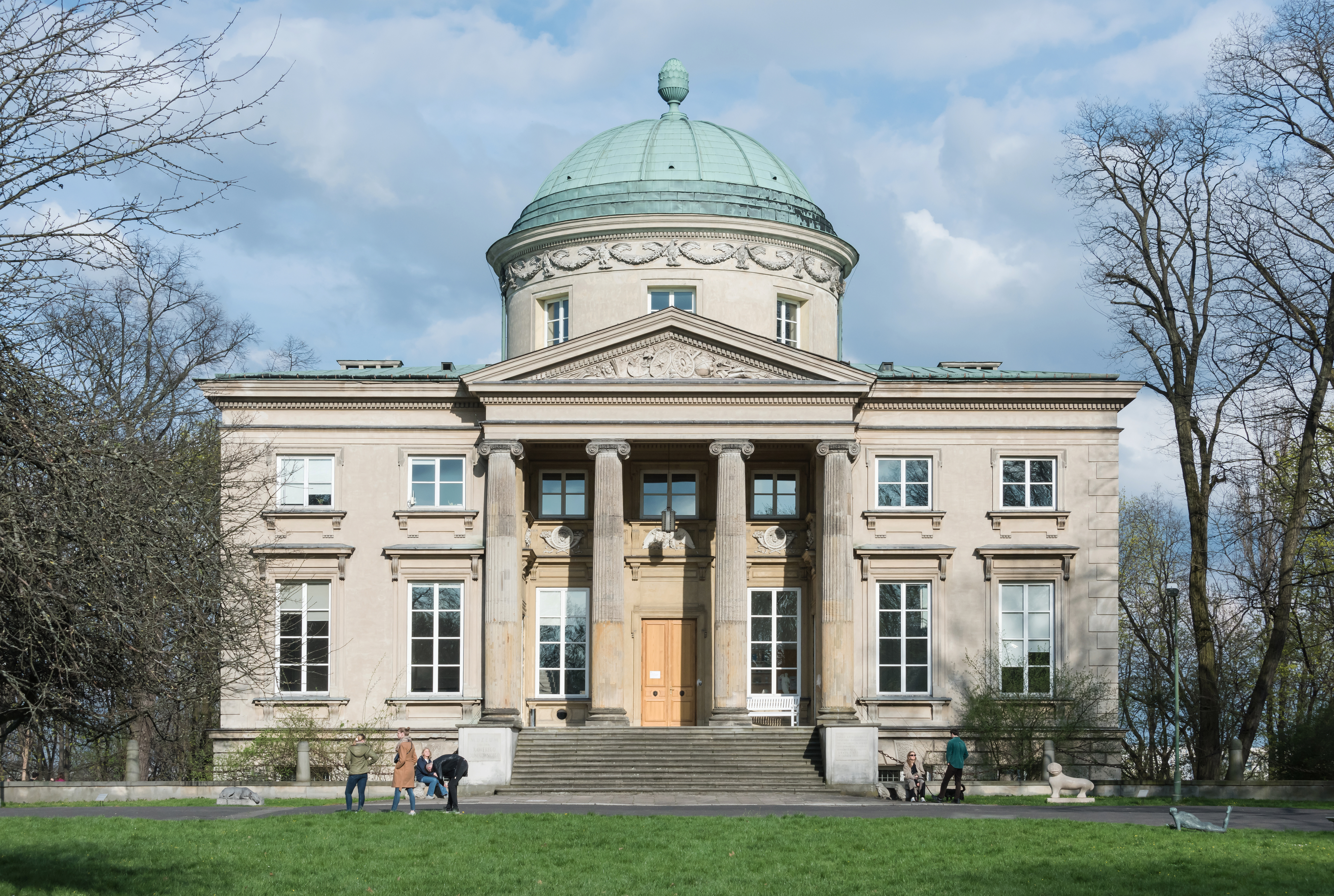
- Main façade.

General information
- Architectural style: Neoclassical
- Location: Warsaw, Poland
- Construction started: 1782
- Completed: 1786
- Demolished: 1944
- Client: Charles Thomatis

Design and construction
- Architect: Domenico Merlini

Other information
- Public transit: Wierzbno

Królikarnia (in English, "The Rabbit House") is a historic classicist palace in Warsaw, Poland; and a neighborhood in the Mokotów district of Warsaw.

Since 1965, the palace has housed a museum dedicated to Polish sculptor Xawery Dunikowski.

== History ==
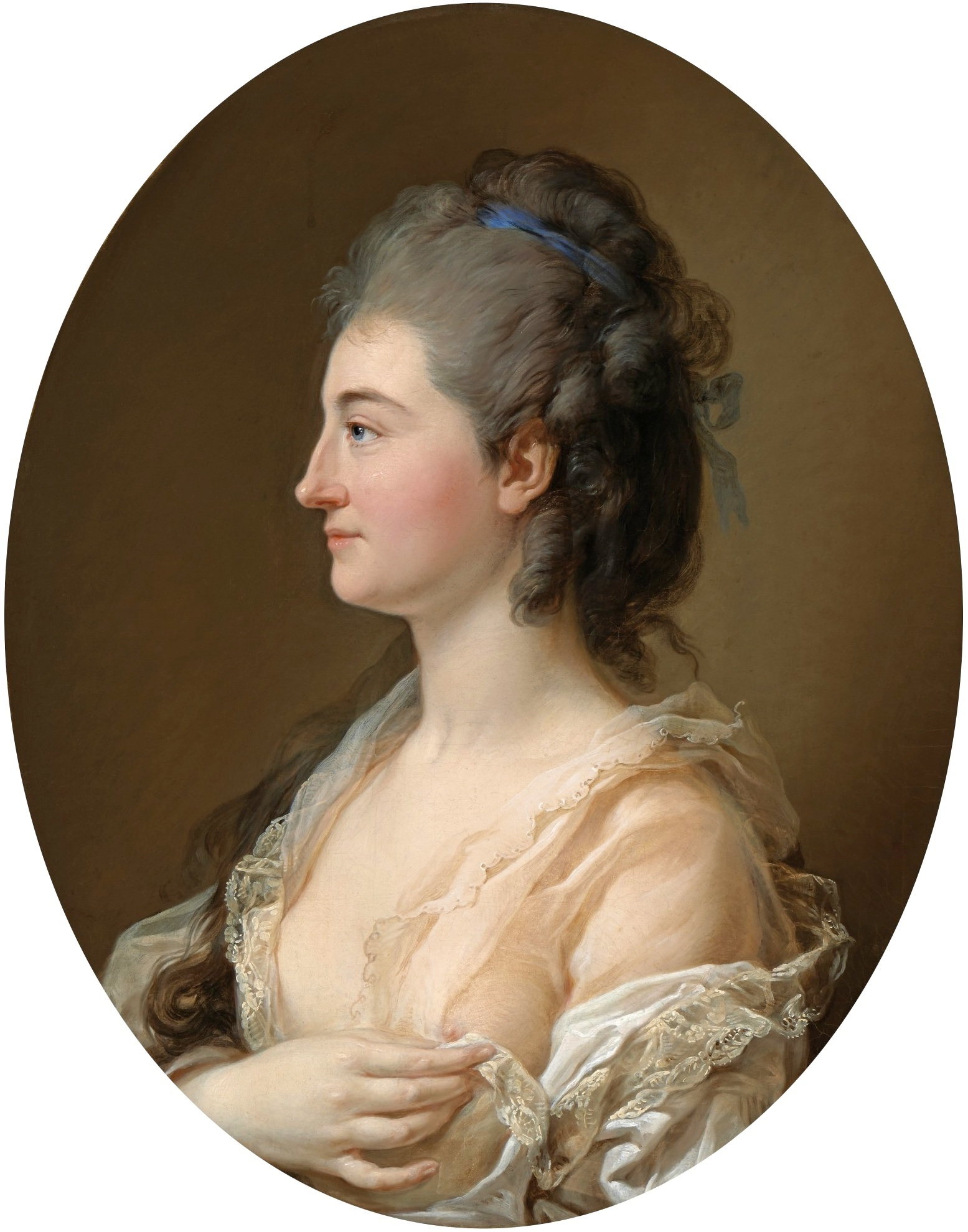
Catherina Gattai Thomatis, mistress to King Stanisław August Poniatowski

The palace is named for its former function as a rabbit warren for Poland's King Augustus II the Strong (reigned 1697–1706 and 1709–33).

The Królikarnia was erected on the picturesque Wisła River escarpment between 1782 and 1786 for King Stanisław August Poniatowski's Theatre Entrepreneur and Chamberlain, Charles Thomatis, Count de Valéry, by royal architect Domenico Merlini. It was modeled after the famous Renaissance-era Villa Rotonda outside Vicenza, Italy, designed by Andrea Palladio. Thomatis, whom biographer of Poniatowski Adam Zamoyski describes as having "pimped for the king," made various uses of the estate, yet Zamoyski concludes that "his villa at Królikarnia was little more than a high-class brothel."

In 1794, during the Kościuszko Uprising, the insurrection's leader Tadeusz Kosciuszko resided in the palace.

In 1816, the estate was purchased by Michał Hieronim Radziwiłł, and in 1849 by Ksawery Pusłowski, a passionate art collector. In 1879, the palace was partly destroyed by fire, and shortly afterward was rebuilt for the Pusłowski family by Józef Huss.

In 1944, during World War II, Królikarnia was completely destroyed in the Warsaw Uprising.

In 1964, it was rebuilt to house a collection of sculptures by Xawery Dunikowski, and now houses the Xawery Dunikowski Museum of Sculpture, opened in 1965. The Museum is a branch of the National Museum in Warsaw.

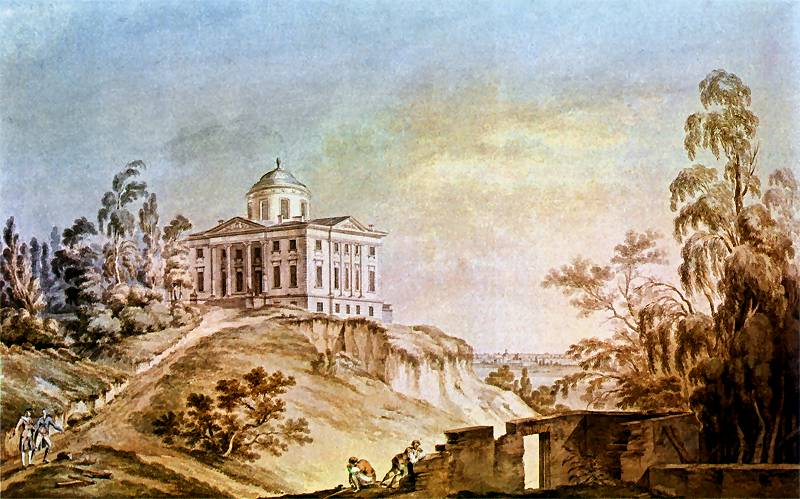
View of Królikarna by Zygmunt Vogel

== See also ==
- Architecture of Warsaw
- Architecture of Poland
