= Caterina Gattai Tomatis =

Italian ballerina

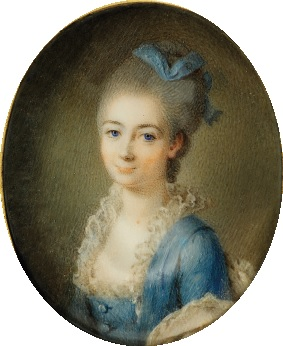
Katarzyna Tomatis

Cecilia Caterina Maria Gattai Tomatis née Filippazzi (Milan, 1747 - 1792, Warsaw), was an Italian ballerina. She was a mistress of Stanisław August Poniatowski. Tomatis is mentioned in the memoirs of Casanova.

Tomatis debuted in Venice in 1760. She was a Prima ballerina at the Royal Opera of Warsaw in 1765-66, during which she had an affair with the king.

In 1766, she married the Italian adventurer Carlo Alessandro Tomatis (1739-1797), who called himself count de Vallery et de la Loux, Baron de la Bridoire. Caterina Tomatis then retired from the stage.

Her relationship with King Stanislaw continued on an on-and-off basis to at least 1778. The king gave her and Carlo Tomatis a large cash gift, allowing them to lead a comfortable life in a palace in Warsaw, participating in high society.
