= Carl Friedrich Pöppelmann =

Carl Friedrich Pöppelmann (1697–1750) was an 18th-century Electorate of Saxony architect and son of Matthäus Daniel Pöppelmann.

== Works ==
His works included:

- Warsaw Castle
- Ujazdów Castle, Warsaw
- New Grodno Castle, Belarus
- Saxon Palace and The Saxon Gardens, Warsaw
- Piaseczno Church, Poland

== Sources ==
- Elżbieta Charazińska, Ogród Saski, Warszawa, 1979, s. 13.
