= Czerniaków =

Neighbourhood in Warsaw, Poland

- City Information System area (neighbourhood)
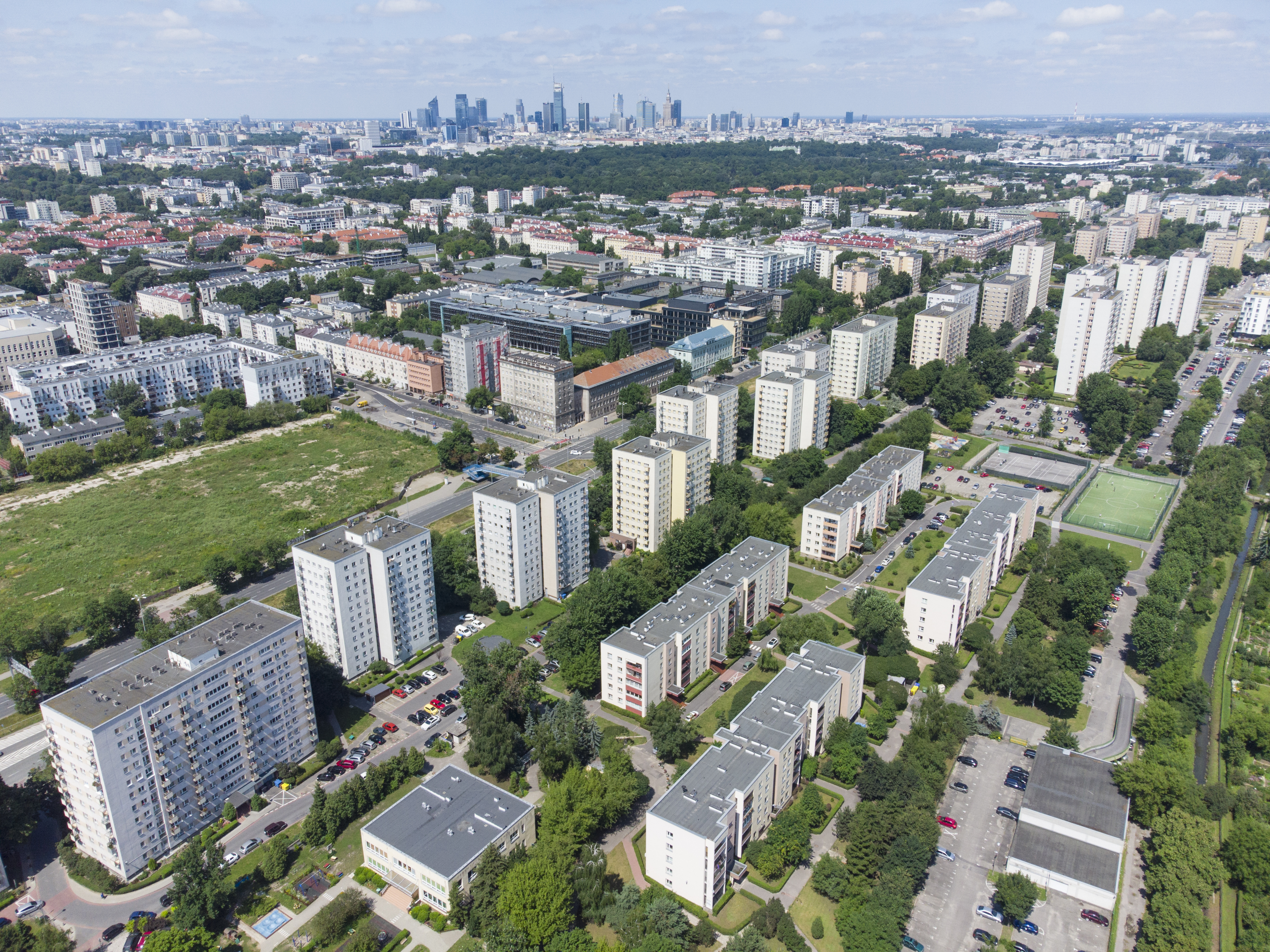
- The housing estate of Czerniakowska Wschodnia within Czerniaków

- The location of Czerniaków within the Mokotów district
- Coordinates: 52°12′27″N 21°03′04″E
- Country: Poland
- Voivodeship: Masovian
- City and county: Warsaw
- District: Mokotów
- Subregion: Lower Mokotów
- Administrative neighbourhood: Sadyba
- Time zone: UTC+1 (CET)
  - Summer (DST): UTC+2 (CEST)
- Area code: +48 22

Czerniaków (Polish: [t͡ʂɛrˈɲa.kuf]) is a neighbourhood, and a City Information System area, in Warsaw, Poland, within the Mokotów district. The area is part of its eastern half, known as the Lower Mokotów. It is a residential neighbourhood with high-rise apartment buildings. The neighbourhood features the St. Anthony of Padua Church dating to 1693, and the Warsaw Uprising Mound, an artificial hill and memorial, as well as the Czerniaków Lake, the largest still body of fresh water in the city.

Czerniaków was founded in the 13th century, as a small farming community. It was incorporated into Warsaw in the 1916, and in the 1920s, together with nearby Sadyba, it developed as a single-family residential neighbourhood, designed with principles of the garden city movement. In the 1970s, two high-rise multifamily houisng estates were constructed in Czerniaków.

== History ==
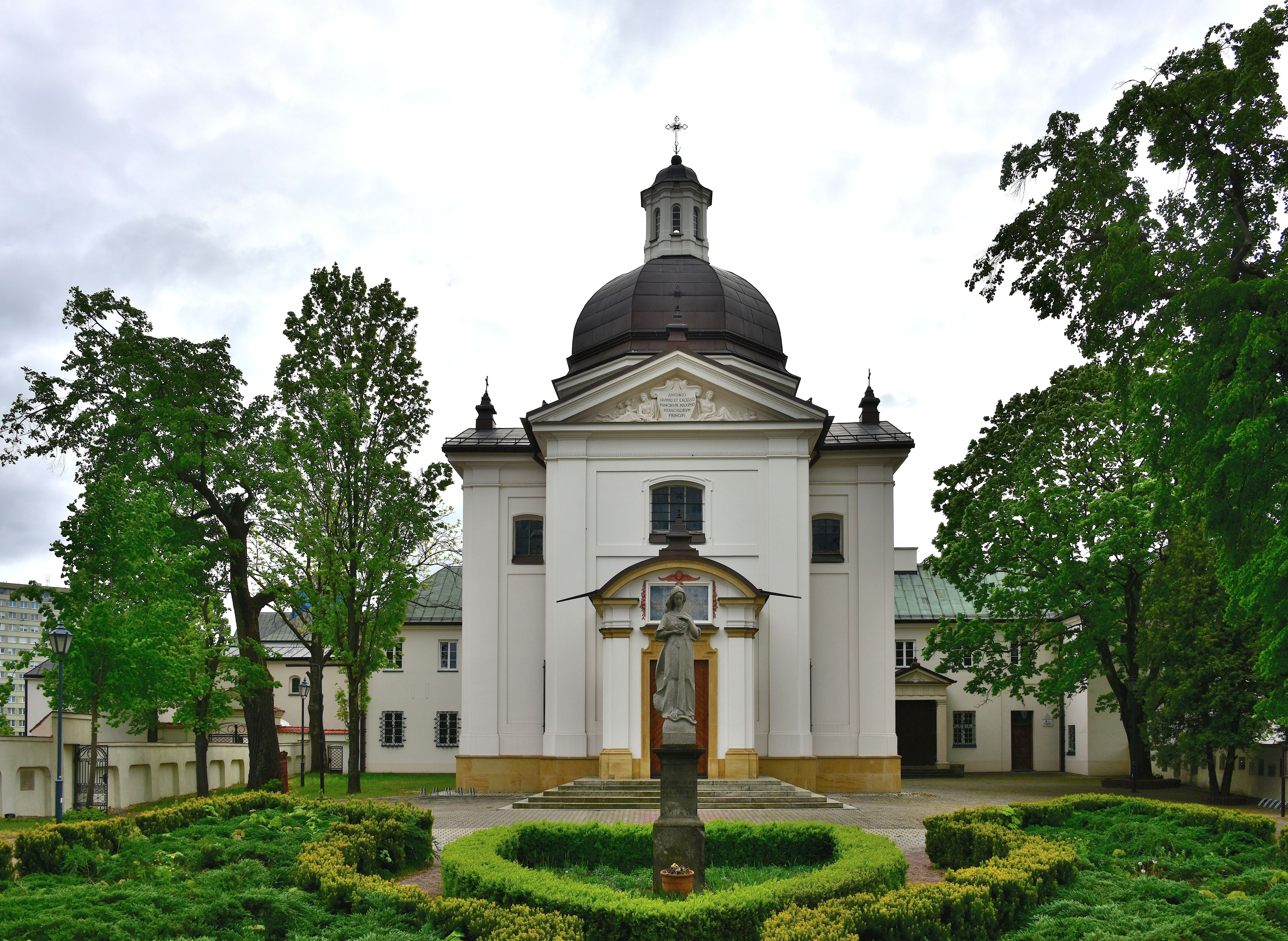
The St. Anthony of Padua Church, built in 1693

A small flint axe dating to around 500 BCE, was discovered near Idzikowskiego Street in the area of the modern Czerniaków.

In the 13th century, the villages of Czerniaków and Czernów, originally known as Czerniakowo and Czarnowo respectively, were founded in the area. Some historians propose that both villages, together with nearby Sielce, originally constituted a single settlement. Later, the village of Siekierki was also founded nearby in the 16th century. Czerniaków was originally part of a Roman Catholic parish of Solec, and since the 13th century, it probably belonged to the parish of Jazdów.

In the 15th century, Czerniaków became the property of Hincza Cedlic, a chamberlain of Warsaw in service of duke Janusz I. His family adopted the surname Czerniakowski, and in 1502, his descendant, Hincza Czerniakowski, sold the village to Mikołaj Milanowski. In 1528 the farmlands belonging to Czerniaków had an area of six Chełmno voloks, corresponding to 107.73 ha. In the second half of the 16th century, the village had a watermill and was inhabited by petty nobility, while nearby Czerniaków Lake was used for fishing.

In the 17th century, Czerniaków was acquired by Andrzej Górski, the voivode of Mazovia. After his death in 1626, the village was inherited by his descendants, and later by the King of Poland. In 1683, it became the property of Stanisław Herakliusz Lubomirski, the Grand Crown Marshal. He financed there construction of a hospital in the village, as well as the Roman Catholic St. Anthony of Padua Church, together with a monastery of Bernardines, opened in 1693. The monastery was closed in 1864, and reactivated in 1945.

From 31 July to 19 August 1732, the exercises and exhibition of the military of the Polish–Lithuanian Commonwealth were held at the field of Czerniaków.

On 13 January 1867, Czerniaków became part of the rural municipality of Mokotów, established as part of the administrative reform in the Kingdom of Poland. In 1909, it was transferred to the municipality of Wilanów. The municipality was incorporated into the city of Warsaw on 8 April 1916.

In 1865, the Czerniaków Harbour was opened on an oxbow lake of Vistula river, and until 1965, it housed a shipyard. In 1886, the River Pumps Station, a water-pumping facility of new municipal waterworks systems operated nearby. It pumped water from the river which was transported to the Lindley Filters. In 1928, the Czerniaków Waste Pond was formed nearby being used for the disposal of water pollutants.

In 1887, the Fort IX, also known as the Fort Czerniaków, was built to the south of the village. It was constructed by the Russian Imperial Army, as part of the Warsaw Fortress, a series of fortifications surrounding the city. It was decommissioned and partially deconstructed in 1913. Currently it is located within the City Information System area of Sadyba.

On 16 May 1891, a line of the narrow-gauge railroad operated by the Wilanów Railway was opened crossing Czerniaków. It included a station next to the St. Anthony of Padua Church. It connected Downtown, with Czerniaków, and was later expanded to Wilanów, and eventually, Piaseczno. Originally, it operated the horse-drawn cars, which were replaced with steam-powered locomotives in 1896. The line was closed down in 1957.

In 1907, the Czerniaków Cemetery was founded at 44 and 46 Powsińska Street, belonging to the Roman Catholic denomination. Currently, it is located within the City Information System area of Sadyba.

In the early 1920s, a neighbourhood of villas, designed following the principles of the garden city movement, was developed next to the Czerniaków Lake and alongside Gorczewska Street. Its buildings were inspired by the Polish manor houses from the 18th and 19th centuries. Later another neighbourhood, named Sadyba, was developed around the Fort IX.

In 1922, the tram tracks were built alongside Czerniakowska Street, with the line ending at the Bernardine Square in Czerniaków. In 1974, the street became part of Vistula Way, a thoroughfare crossing the city on the north–south axis. To facilitate the change, the tram tracks were removed from the road in 1973.

In the 1930s, artificial water canals were built to irrigate farmlands in Czerniaków and Siekierki by diverting the water to the Vistula river. Prior to 1939, Czerniaków was an impoverished parts. At the time, the neighbourhood, together with Powiśle was referred locally as the "Lowland" (Polish: Dół), due to its lower elevation when compared to the Downtown.

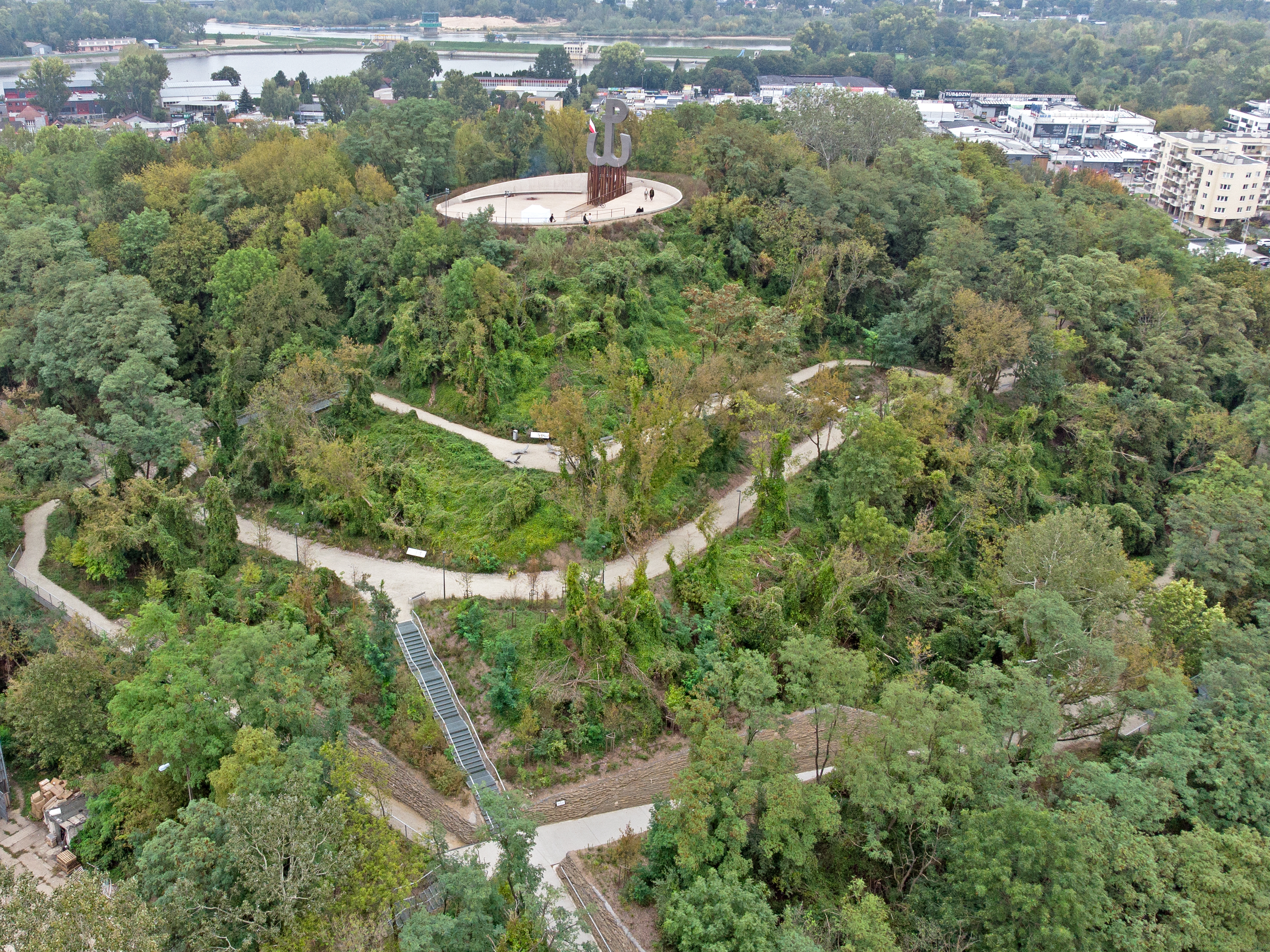
The Warsaw Uprising Mound, formed between 1945 and the 1960s

In 1945, the Warsaw Uprising Mound began being formed next to Bartycka Street. It was an artificial hill made from the rubble of buildings from across the city, which were destroyed during the Second World War. It continued to be used as a landfill until the 1960s. In 2004, it was cleaned up, and turned into a scenic viewpoint. A sculpture was placed on its top, depicting the Anchor, the symbol of the Polish Underground State during the Second World War, meant to commemorate the Warsaw Uprising. An urban park, named the Operation Tempest Park, was developed in the area around the mound.

In 1956, the Czerniaków Hospital was opened at 19 and 25 Stępińska Street. Currently, it is located within the City Information System area of Sielce.

Between 1970 and 1980, two housing estates of high-rise apartment buildings were developed in Czerniaków. They were Bernardyńska around Gołkowska Street, and Czerniakowska Wschodnia around Czerniakowska Street.

On 4 October 1996, the Mokotów district was subdivided into twelve City Information System areas, with Czerniaków becoming one of them. Parts of the historical neighbourhood became part of Sadyba instead. In 1997, a small portion of Czerniaków, between Czerniakowska Street, Idzikowskiego Street, and Witosa Avenue, also became part of the then-established administrative neighbourhood of Sadyba.

In 2002, Józef Bem Avenue was opened in Czerniaków, forming a part of Siekieri Route, a thoroughfare connecting the west and east banks of the Vistula river.

In 2019, the Memorial to the Soldiers of the Peasant Battalions and the People's Union of Women was unveiled at the corner of Czerniakowska Street and Polski Walczącej Avenue. It was designed by Agnieszka Świerzowicz-Maślaniec and Marek Maślaniec, and dedicated to the soldiers of the Peasant Battalions and the People's Union of Women, resistance organisations active in Poland during the Second World War.

== Characteristics ==
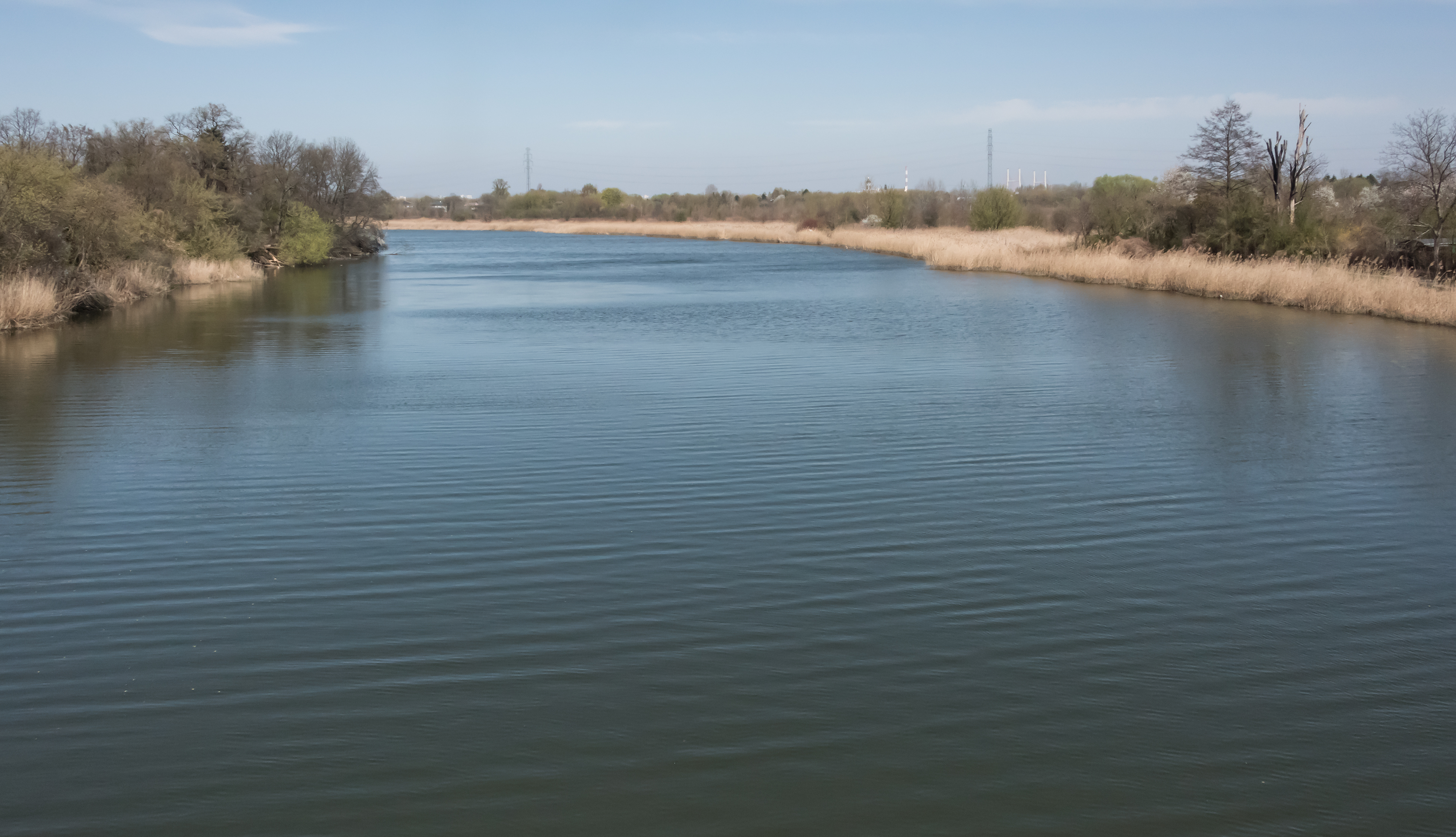
The Czerniaków Lake, the largest still body of fresh water in the city

Czerniaków is a residential area with high-rise multifamily housing. It includes two housing estates of apartment buildings, which are Bernardyńska around Gołkowska Street, and Czerniakowska Wschodnia around Czerniakowska Street.

The Warsaw Uprising Mound, an artificial hill with the height of 121 m above the sea level, or 31 m of relative height, is located near Bartycka Street. It is a scenic viewpoint, featuring a sculpture at its top, which depicts the Anchor, the symbol of the Polish Underground State during the Second World War, commemorating the Warsaw Uprising. The mound is surrounded by an urban park, named the Operation Tempest Park. Additionally, Memorial to the Soldiers of the Peasant Battalions and the People's Union of Women is at the corner of Czerniakowska Street and Polski Walczącej Avenue. It was designed by Agnieszka Świerzowicz-Maślaniec and Marek Maślaniec, and unveiled in 2019. It is dedicated to the soldiers of the Peasant Battalions and the People's Union of Women, resistance organisations active in Poland during the Second World War.

The St. Anthony of Padua Church, a Roman Catholic] parish church dating to 1693, together with a monastery of Bernardines, is at 2 and 4 Czerniakowska Street.

To the southeast, the neighbourhood also borders the Czerniaków Lake, which, together with surrounding it area, has the status of a nature reserve. With an area of 19.5 ha, it is the largest fresh water lake in Warsaw. It is also a bathing lake with a beach, the only in the city with such legal status. Additionally, to the north, the neighbourhood borders the Czerniaków Waste Pond, used for the disposal of water pollutants by the River Pumps Station, operated by the Waterworks and Sewage Municipal Company of the Capital City of Warsaw. Two artificial canals, called Czerniaków and Siekierki, also cross the neighbourhood, emptying in the Vistula river.

Czerniaków is crossed by Józef Bem Avenue, which forms a part of the Siekieri Route, a thoroughfare connecting west and east banks of Vistula river.

A small part of the City Information System area of Czerniaków belongs to the administrative neighbourhood of Sadyba, located between Czerniakowska Street, Idzikowskiego Street, and Witosa Avenue.

== Location and boundaries ==
Czerniaków is located in the city of Warsaw, Poland, within the north central portion of the Mokotów district, within the subregion of Lower Mokotów. Its boundaries are approximately determined to the north by Czerniaków Waste Pond and the building of the Waterworks and Sewage Municipal Company of the Capital City of Warsaw; to the east by Siekierki Canal, Czerniaków Lake, and the boundary with Siekierki; to the south by Gołkowska Street, and Idzikowskiego Street; and to the west by Witosa Avenue, and Czerniakowska Street. The neighbourhood borders Ujazdów to the north, Augustówka and Siekierki to the east, Sadyba to the south, and Sielce to the west.
