= Wilanów Wysoki =

Neighbourhood of Warsaw, Poland

- City Information System area (neighbourhood)
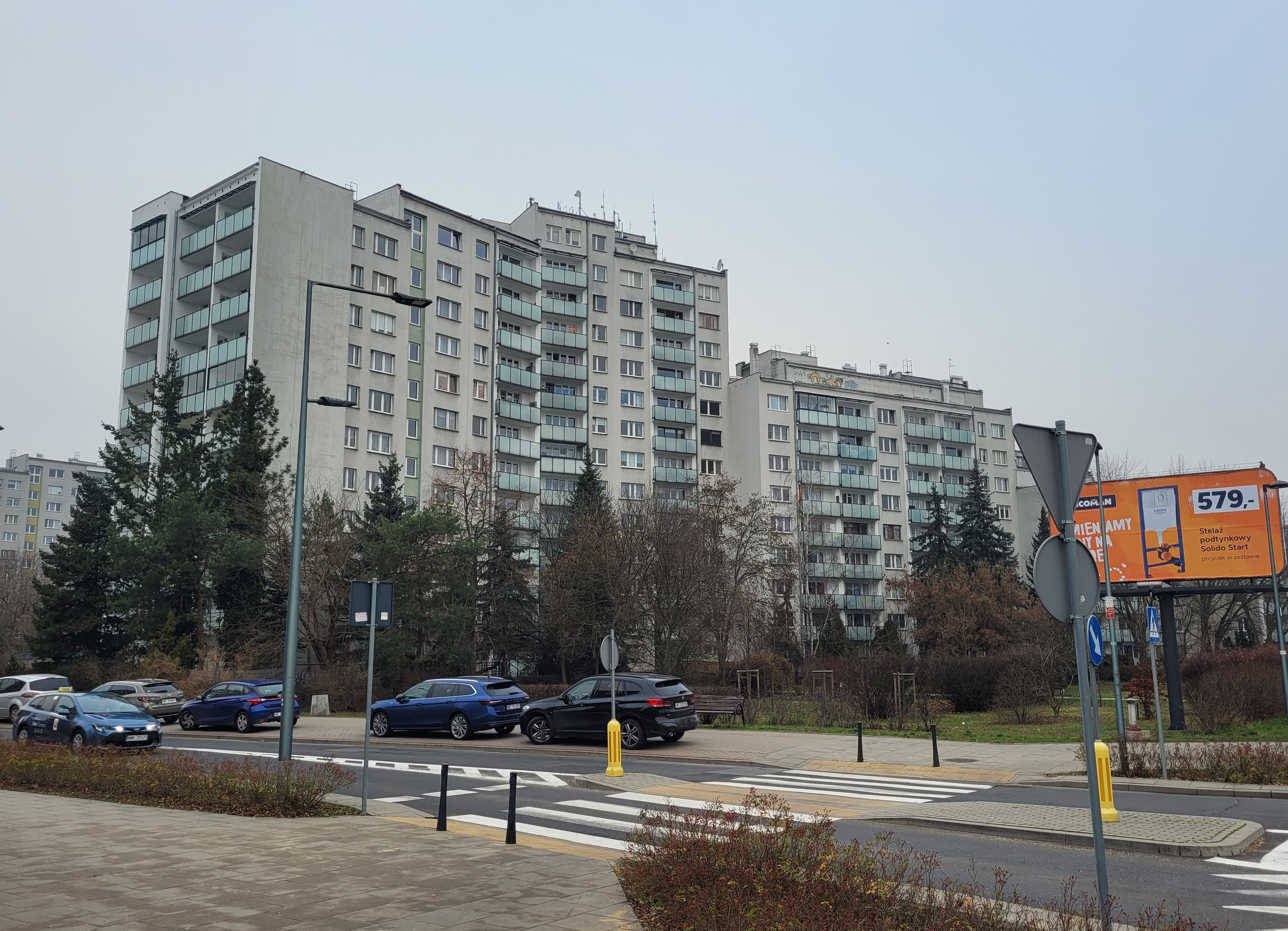
- Apartment buildings on Jabłonowskiego Street.

- Map of the subdivisions of Wilanów, including Wilanów Niski
- Coordinates: 52°10′21″N 21°04′09″E
- Country: Poland
- Voivodeship: Masovian
- City and county: Warsaw
- District: Wilanów
- Time zone: UTC+1 (CET)
  - Summer (DST): UTC+2 (CEST)
- Area code: +48 22

Wilanów Wysoki (Polish: [viˈla.nuf vɘ̟ˈsɔ.ki]; lit. 'High-rise Wilanów') is a neighbourhood, and a City Information System area, in Warsaw, Poland, within the Wilanów district. It is a high-rise multifamily residential area, consisting of three housing estates of apartment buildings. This includes the neighbourhood of Wilanów III, colloquially known to as the Bay of Red Pigs, due to it being predominately inhabited by the politicians of the Polish United Workers' Party in the 1980s. Together with the areas of Wilanów Królewski and Wilanów Niski, Wilanów Wysoki forms the neighbourhood of Old Wilanów.

The area was incorporated into Warsaw in 1951. From 1972 to 1979, two housing estates were developed in the area, consisting of apartment buildings constructed with the large panel system technique. In the 1980s, a third housing estate was built to the southeast, with some of its majority of its apartments being assigned to the politicians of the Polish United Workers' Party, leading it becoming known as the Bay of Red Pigs.

== Toponomy ==
The name Wilanów Wysoki translates directly from Polish to High-rise Wilanów, referring it being a high-rise multifamily residential area, in contrast to the nearby Wilanów Niski (lit. 'Low-rise Wilanów') being a low-rise single-family residential area. The name Wilanów itself was coined in the 16th century, as a Polonised borrowing of a Latin name Villa Nova, meaning "new village", which was used to refer to one of the residences in the area. Previously, the settlement was known as Milanów and Milanowo, with records of the name dating to the 13th century.

== History ==
Relicts of a human settlement, present in the area from the turn of the 12th to the 13th century, were discovered at the intersection of Sobieskiego Street, and Wilanowska Avenue, during the archeologist excavation conducted between 1976 and 1978. Forty objects were found, including huts with hearths, and farm buildings.

The area was incorporated into the city of Warsaw on 15 May 1951.

Between 1972 and 1975, the housing estate of Wilanów I was developed with several buildings, placed between Sobieskiego, Nałęczowska, Niemirowska, Resorowa, and Lentza Streets. Designed by T. Mrówczyński, it consisted of mid- and high-rise apartment buildings, constructed using the large panel system technique. It had a total of 730 apartments for around 2,200 residents, and covered an area of 5 ha. The area was expanded between 1976 and 1979, with another housing estate, known as Wilanów II, located between Królowej Marysieńki, Lentza, Resorowa, and Goplańska Streets. It was designed by J. Lipińska, it consisted of high-rise apartment buildings, also constructed with the large panel system technique, and covered an area of 20 ha.

In the 1980s, another housing estate, designated as Wilanów III, was built to the southeast, between Królowej Marysieński Street, Kosiarzy Street, Wilanowska Avenue, and Lentza Street, on an area of 11 ha. It was developed by the Council of Ministers Office, on an area which was expropriated for the construction of a hospital in 1975. It consisted of mid- and high-rise apartment buildings, constructed with the large panel system technique, and designed by W. Piziarski, J. Semeniuk, among others architects. Majority of its apartments were assigned to the politicians of the Polish United Workers' Party, including Aleksander Kwaśniewski, Leszek Miller, Józef Oleksy, Jerzy Szmajdziński, and Janusz Zemke, among others. The housing estate became colloquially known by the public as the Bay of Red Pigs (Polish: Zatoka czerwonych świń).

In 2006, the National Public Prosecutor's Office, from the request by the Internal Security Agency, begun an investigation into the owners of the apartments in buildings at Wiktorii Wiedeńskiej and Marconich Streets, within the housing estate of Wilanów III. They were sold by the city to the residents between 1996 and 1998, with prices greatly lower than their contemporary market value. Among investigated were high-ranking members of the government, including former president Aleksander Kwaśniewski, and former prime ministers Leszek Miller and Józef Oleksy. In 2008, the investigation was dismissed, in 41 cases due to lack of evidence, and in 4, due to the expiration of the statute of limitation.

On 26 September 2006, the Wilanów district was subdivided into eight City Information System areas, with Wilanów Wysoki becoming one of them.

== Characteristics ==
The neighbourhood of Wilanów Wysoki is a mid- and high-rise residential area, predominantly consisting of apartment buildings constructed in the 1970s and 1980s, using the large panel system technique. It is divided into three housing estates, including Wilanów I, with an area of 5 ha, located between Sobieskiego, Nałęczowska, Niemirowska, Resorowa, and Lentza Street; Wilanów II, with an area of 20 ha, between Królowej Marysieńki, Lentza, Resorowa, and Goplańska Streets; and Wilanów III, with an area of 11 ha, between Królowej Marysieński Street, Kosiarzy Street, Wilanowska Avenue, and Lentza Street. The later of the three is colloquially known as the Bay of Red Pigs (Polish: Zatoka czerwonych świń), due to it being predominately inhabited by the politicians of the Polish United Workers' Party in the 1980s.

== Location and boundaries ==
Wilanów Niski is a City Information System area in Warsaw, located in the central north portion of the Wilanów district. Its boundaries are approximately determined to the northwest by Nałęczowska Street, Niemirowska Street, and Goplańska Street; to the northeast by Królowej Marysieńki Street and in a streight line from Obornicka Street; to the southeast by Wilanowska Avenue; and to the southwest by Sobieskiego Street. The neighbourhood borders Sadyba to the north, Wilanów Niski to the east, Powsinek and Wilanów Królewski to the south, and Stegny to the west.
