= Szopy, Warsaw =

Neighbourhood in Warsaw, Poland

Szopy
- Neighbourhood
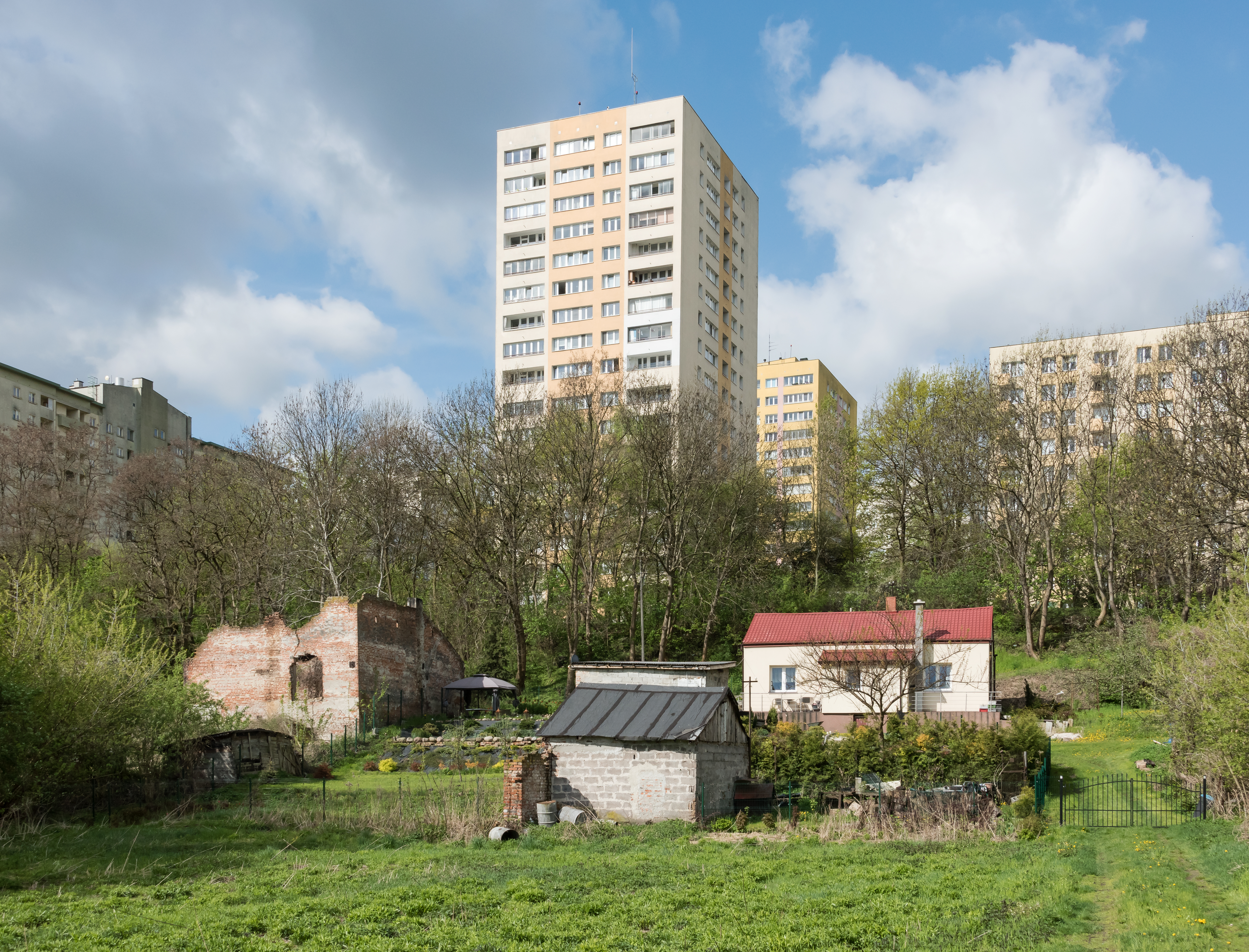
- Abandoned buildings on Bocheńska Street in Szopy, in 2023.
- Interactive map of Szopy
- Country: Poland
- Voivodeship: Masovian
- City county: Warsaw
- District: Mokotów
- Subdistrict: Lower Mokotów
- City Information System area: Stegny
- Time zone: UTC+1 (CET)
  - Summer (DST): UTC+2 (CEST)
- Area code: +48 22

Szopy (Polish: [ˈʂɔ.pɘ̟]) is a neighbourhood in the city of Warsaw, Poland. It is located in the district of Mokotów, in the City Information System area of Stegny. The neighbourhood consists of low-rise houses located around Bocheńska Street, and Jaśminowa Street.

The first known mention of Szopy in the documentation comes from 1456. It was a small settlement owned by petty noble family of Szopski, located in the area of Puławska Street. In the late 18th century, in the portion of Szopy had settled German population. Since then the settlement became divided mostly into two portions, with the western portion inhabited by the German population becoming known as Szopy Niemieckie (German Szopy), and the eastern portion, inhabited by Polish population, known as Szopy Polskie (Polish Szopy). To the north of Szopy Polskie, was also located Szopy Francuskie (French Szopy), inhabited by French population. In 1916, Szopy was incorporated into the city of Warsaw. Currently, most of the historical area of the settlement was overbuilt, mostly in the 1970s, with the multifamily residential apartment buildings. A few remaining historical buildings are located mostly in the historical portion of Szopy Polskie, around Bocheńska Street, and Jaśminowa Street.

== History ==
The first known mention of Szopy in the documentation, then listed as Sopi, comes from 1456. It was a folwark-type settlement originally owned by petty noble family of Szopski. The settlement was located to the south from Wierzbno and Królikarnia palace, in the area around current Puławska Street.

Since the first half of the 17th century, the settlement was owned by the order of Discalced Carmelites. In 1795, as the area became part of the Kingdom of Prussia, Szopy was nationalized. In the late 18th century, the Prussian government had placed German settlers, in the western portion of the settlement, to the west of Puławska Street. As such it became known as Szopy Niemieckie (German Szopy). It was located in the modern City Information System area of Ksawerów. The area inhabited by Polish population, in the eastern portion of the settlement, to the east of Puławska Street, became known as Szopy Polskie (Polish Szopy). To the north of Szopy Polskie, was also located Szopy Francuskie (French Szopy), settled by French people. Both of those settlements were located in the modern City Information System area of Stegny.

On 8 April 1916, Szopy, together with the surrounding area, was incorporated into the city of Warsaw.

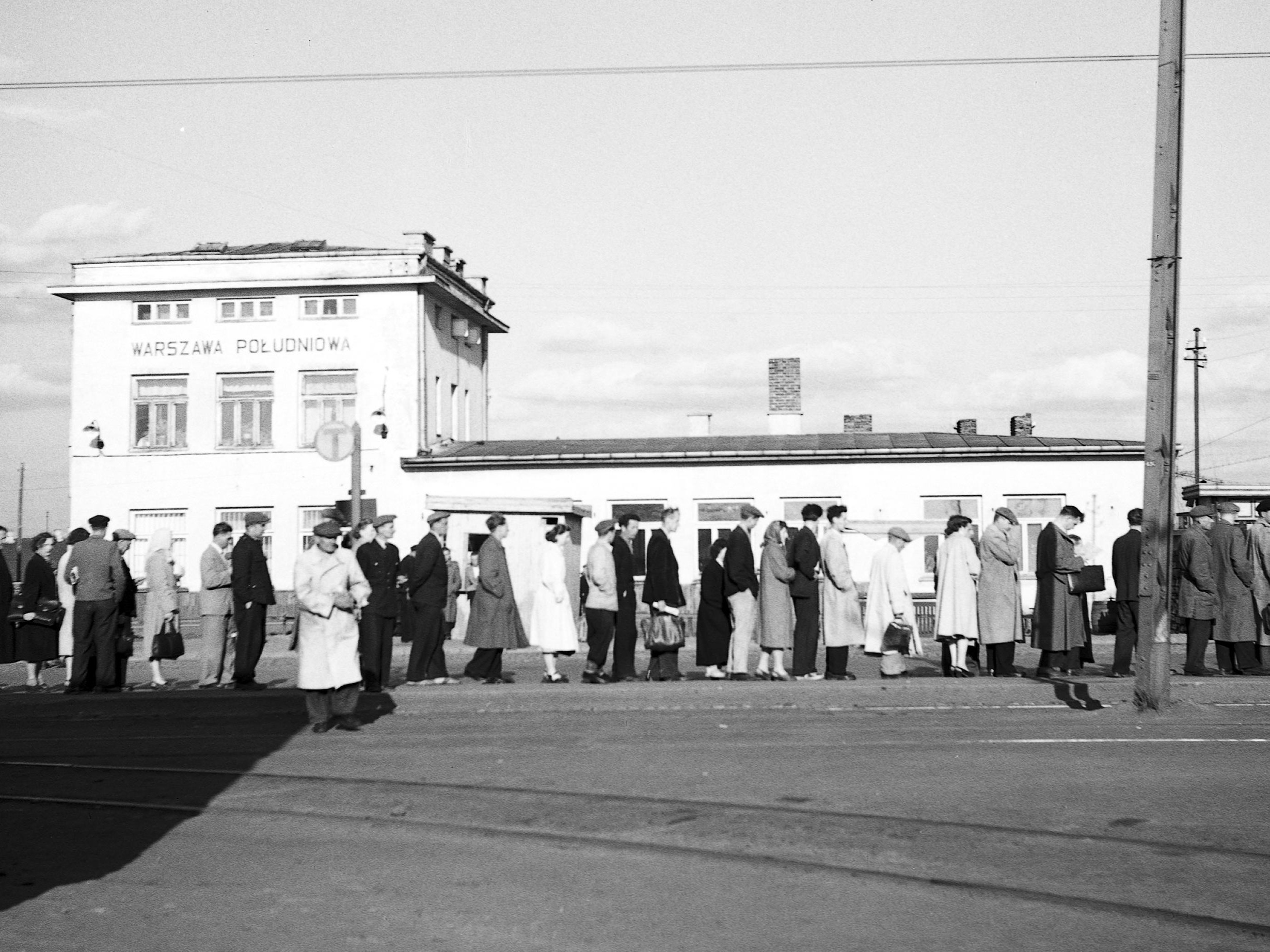
The main building of the Warszawa Południowa railway station, located in Szopy, in the 1950s.

In 1937, in the settlement was opened the Warszawa Szopy railway station, later known as Warszawa Południowa. It was operated by the Grójec Narrow-Gauge Railway, and was part of the railway line between stations of Warszawa Mokotów and Nowe Miasto nad Pilicą. The station operated until 1969. Its building was deconstructed in 2000. It was located near Puławska Street. On 7 April 1995, in its place was opened Wilanowska station of the M1 line of the Warsaw Metro.

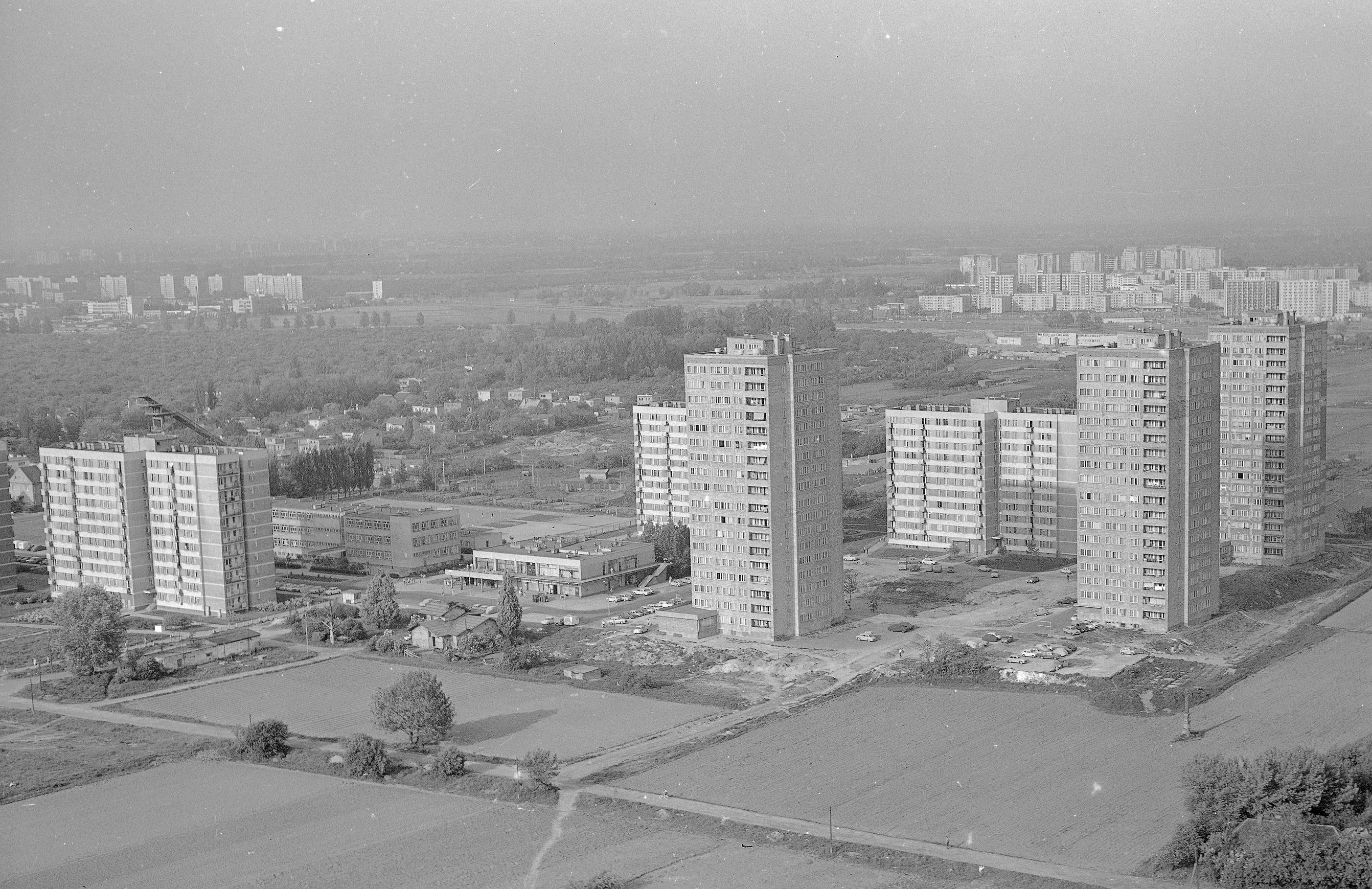
The buildings of the neighbourhood of Skocznia, and the remaining buildings of Szopy Niemieckie, in 1974.

Most of the historical low-rise houses of Szopy were overbuilt, mostly in the 1970s with the multifamily residential apartment buildings. Between 1968 and 1975, in the area of Szopy Niemieckie was built a residential neighbourhood of Skocznia. A few remaining historical buildings are mostly located in the historical portion of Szopy Polskie, around Bocheńska Street, and Jaśminowa Street.
