= Sadyba =

Neighbourhood in Warsaw, Poland

- City Information System area (neighbourhood)
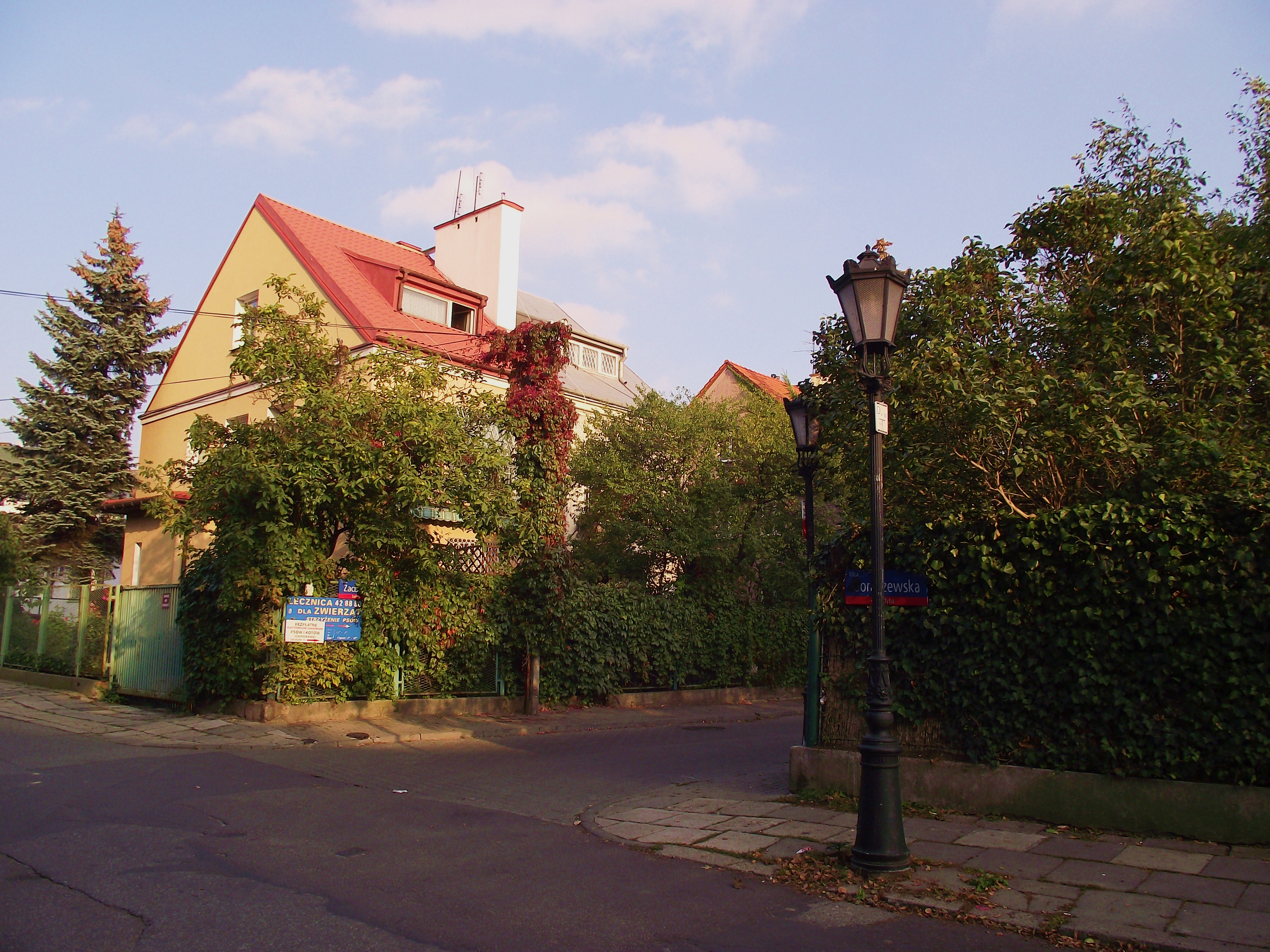
- Godebskiego Street in Sadyba

- The location of Augustówka within the Mokotów district.
- Coordinates: 52.188747°N 21.068766°E
- Country: Poland
- Voivodeship: Masovian
- City and county: Warsaw
- District: Mokotów
- Subregion: Lower Mokotów
- Administrative neighbourhood: Sadyba
- Time zone: UTC+1 (CET)
  - Summer (DST): UTC+2 (CEST)
- Area code: +48 22

Sadyba (Polish: [saˈdɘ̟.ba]) is a neighbourhood, and the City Information System area, in Warsaw, Poland, within the Mokotów district. It is a residential area with low-rise single-family housing in the south and high-rise multifamily housing in the north. In 1887, Fort IX was built in the area, as part of the series of fortifications surrounding the city, and was incorporated into Warsaw in 1916. Throughout the 1920s, the neighbourhoods of Sadyba and Garden City of Czerniaków, with the low-rise single-family housing, were developed in the area. In the 1970s, several housing estates of high-rise apartment buildings were developed in Sadyba. In 2000, Sadyba Best Mall, one of the oldest shopping malls in Poland, was opened in the neighbourhood.

== Toponomy ==
The term sadyba means in Polish a settlement, and archaically, also means an isolated house, usually with rudimentary structure. During the interwar period, the term was used by the Polish Armed Forces as a name for military settlements in the Eastern Borderlands of Poland. The neighbourhood was founded by a group of soldiers of the Polish Armed Forces, whom named it after said term.

== History ==
In the 1880s, the Fort IX and Fort Che were built to the south of the village of Czerniaków, on Powsińska Street. They were constructed by the Russian Imperial Army, as part of the Warsaw Fortress, a series of fortifications surrounding the city. They were decommissioned in 1909, and Fort IX was partially demolished in 1913. The remains of the moat of the Fort Che, now forming a small pond, known as Bernardyńska Woda.

In 1907, the Czerniaków Cemetery was opened at 44 and 46 Powsińska Street, serving the nearby village of Czerniaków, with the structure now located within the boundaries of Sadyba.

On 8 April 1916, the area was incorporated into the city of Warsaw. In 1919, a series of single-family houses were constructed alongside Gorczerwska Street, stretching between Czerniaków Lake and Posińska Street. In the early 1920s, in the area of Czerniaków Lake was also developed a neighbourhood of villas, known as the Garden City of Czerniaków (Polish: Miasto-Ogród Czerniaków). It was designed following the garden city movement princiles, and later the houses inspired by the 18th- and 19th-century Polish manor houses were developed in the area.

Between 1924 and 1928, the neighbourhood of Sadyba was developed around the Fort IX, and with its outer boundary marked by Okrężna Street. It consisted of detached and semi-detached single-family houses. It was developed by the Sadyba Officer Construction and Housing Association (Polish: Oficerska Spółdzielnia Budowlano-Mieszkaniową „Sadyba”), founded in 1923 by officers of the General Staff of the Polish Armed Forces, with major Władysław Kuntz and general Józef Zając at its helm. First residents moved in 1926, which included families of 28 organisation founders, and numerous officers of the Polish Armed Forces, including veterans of the First World War and the Polish–Soviet War. In 1933, the Association of the Friends of Garden City of Czerniaków was founded, being granted the ownership of the Fort IX by the city. In 1936, the remains of the fortifications on the eastern side of Powsińska Street were destroyed, with the area being developed into a park, later named Szczubełek Park in 1993.

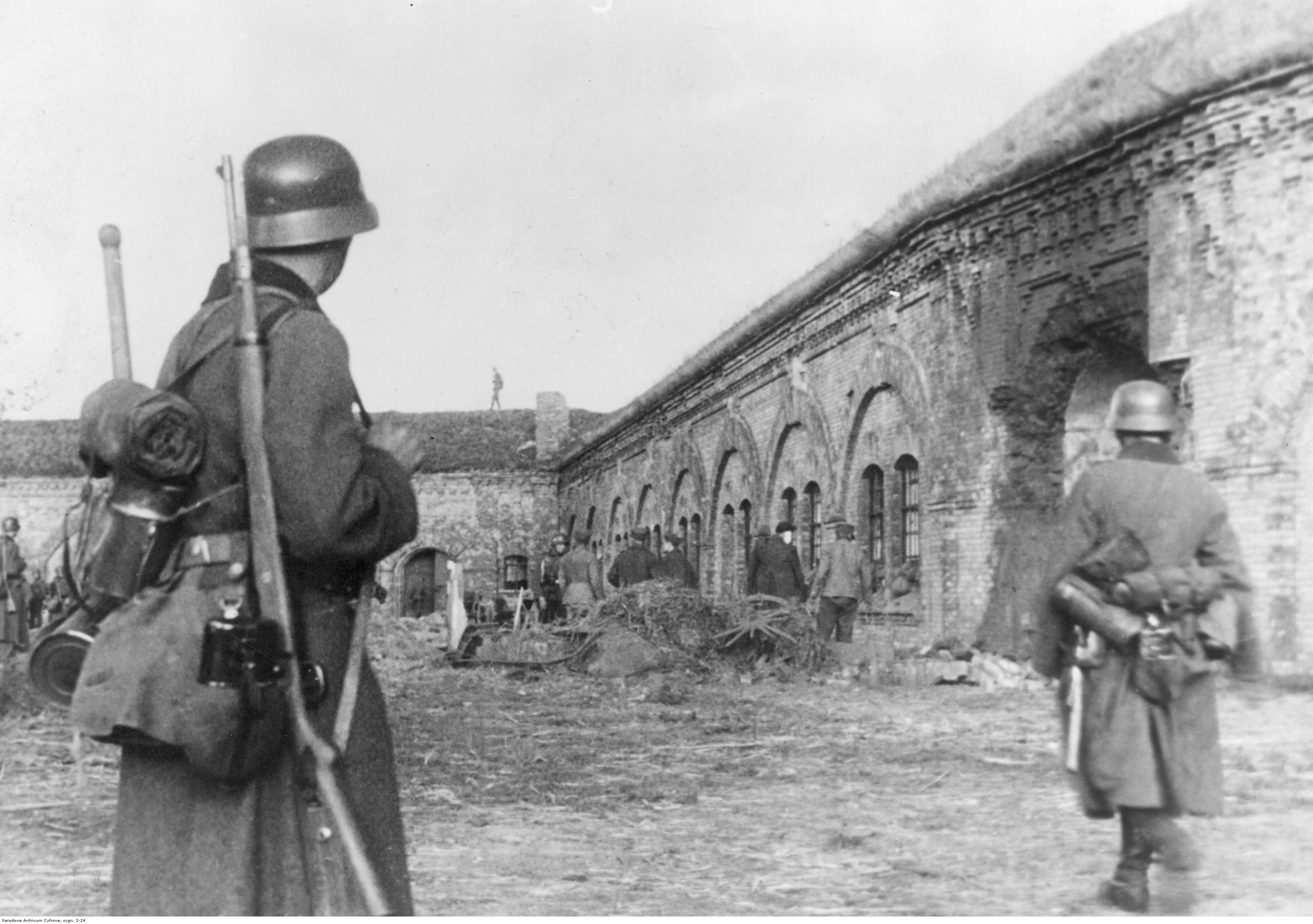
The Fort IX, one of the city fortifications, dating to 1887. Photography made in 1944, while it was occupied by the German Army during the Second World War.

During the siege of Warsaw in the Second World War, the Fort IX was used as defensive position by the Polish Land Forces, including the 2nd Battalion of the 360th Infantry Regiment and other volunteers. The fortification was attacked by the German Army on 26 September 1939, and following heavy fighting, captured after its defenders capitulated. During the Warsaw Uprising, the fort was abandoned by German soldiers on 7 August 1944, and from 19 August, the fort, together with the nearby neighbourhoods of Sadyba and the Garden City of Czerniaków, were occupied by the soldiers of the Oaza Battalion of the Home Army, which moved to the area from the Chojnów Woods. The German forces, led by major general Günther Rohr begun attacking the area on 29 August 1944. The neighbourhood was also heavily bombarded by the German Air Force. On 1 September, Sadyba was attacked by German forces greatly outnumbering Polish defenders. On that day, a bomb was dropped from a plane onto the fort, killing leader of Oaza Battalion, Czesław Szczubełek, and 24 others members. The neighbourhood was captured the next day. Around 200 Polish soldiers died in fighting, with only a few managing to retreat. Afterwards, the German officers executed Polish prisoners-of-war captured in Sadyba, and conducted series of executions of civilians in the area, including men, women, and children. This included the killing of around 80 residents of houses on Podhalańska, Klarysewska, Chochołowska Streets.

In 1969, the new headquarters of the Institute of Food and Nutrition was opened at 61 and 63 Powsińska Street.

Beginning in 1969, throughout the 1970s, housing estates of high-rise apartment buildings were developed between Św. Bonifacego, Powsińska, Idzikowskiego, and Jana III Sobieskiego Streets. They were constructed with the large panel system technology. The undeveloped area in its centre, located between Limanowskiego, Konstancińska, Jaszowiecka, and Spalska Streets became a recreational area, later named the Dygat Park in 2009.

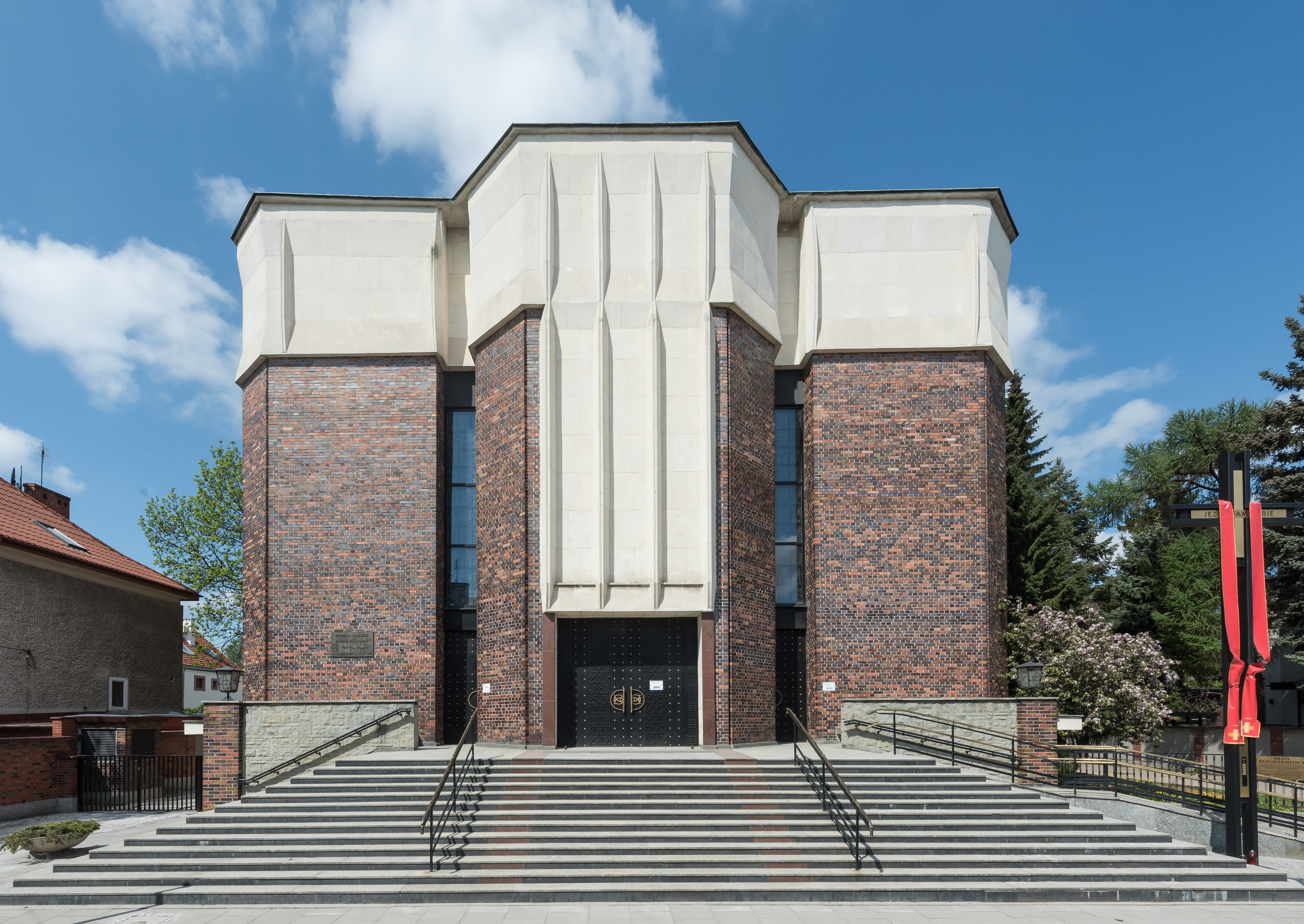
The St. Thaddeus the Apostle Church, built in 1985.

Between 1981 and 1985, the St. Thaddeus the Apostle Church, which belongs to the Roman Catholic denomination, was built at 16 Goraszewska Street.

In 1993, the Museum of Polish Military Technology and the Katyń Museum were opened in the Fort IX. The latter was moved to the Warsaw Citadel in 2009. The same year, the historic architecture of single-family houses in the neighbourhood of Sadyba was placed onto the national heritage list.

On 4 October 1996, the Mokotów district was subdivided into twelve City Information System areas, with Sadyba becoming one of them. On 4 December 1997, the administrative neighbourhood of Sadyba was established, as a subdivision of the Mokotów district, governed by an elected council, with its boundaries determined by Witosa Avenue, Czerniakowska, Powsińska, Bonifacego, and Jana III Sobieskiego Streets.

In 2000, Sadyba Best Mall was opened at 31 Powsińska Street. It was one of the first shopping malls opened in Poland, and the first to offer the IMAX cinema.

In 2005, a bronze sculpture by Jarosław Urbański, titled The Locomotive, was unveiled at the corner of Powsińska and Okrężna. It depicts a small steam-powered locomotive, commemorating the Wilanów Railway line, which crossed the neighbourhood at the turn of the 20th century.

In 2013, a small garden square at the corner of Powsińska and Okrężna Street was named the Armenian Square, to celebrate Armenian minority in Poland. A khachkar, a traditional Armenian memorial stone sculpture bearing a cross, was placed at in the garden. Eighteen oak trees were also planted there, being dedicated in memorial to officers of the Polish Armed Forces from Sadyba, which were murdered in the Katyn massacre.

In 2024, tram line tracks were opened alongside Jana III Sobieskiego Street.

== Characteristics ==
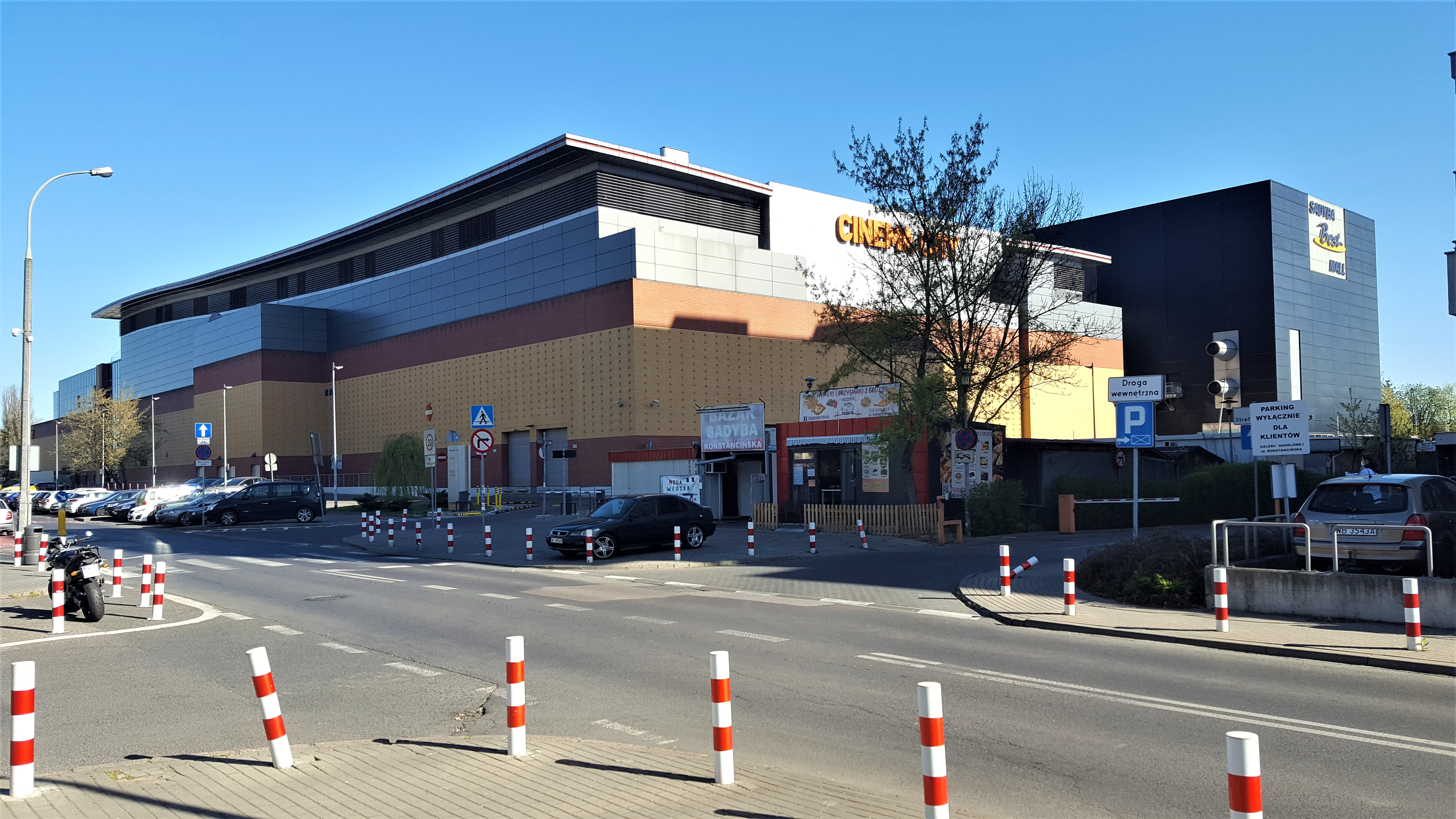
Sadyba Best Mall, one of the oldest shopping malls in Poland.

Sadyba is a residential area. To the south of Św. Bonifacego Street, it features low-rise single-family housing with detached and semi-detached houses, some dating to the 1920s. To the north, it features the housing estate of Sadyba, consisting of the high-rise multifamily housing with large-panel-system apartment buildings, most dating to the 1970s. The neighbourhood also features Sadyba Best Mall, one of the oldest shopping malls in Poland, located at 31 Powsińska Street. The neighbourhood is crossed by a tram line tracks alongside Jana III Sobieskiego Street.

The Fort IX, a 19th-century decommissioned fortification, now housing the Museum of Polish Military Technology, is located at Powsińska Street in Sadyba. It is surrounded by two urban parks, the Szczubełek Park to the east, and the Armenian Square to the north. The latter includes the 18 oak trees, dedicated in memorial to officers of the Polish Armed Forces from Sadyba, that were murdered in the Katyn massacre. Additionally, further to the north, the neighbourhood also includes the Dygat Park placed between Limanowskiego, Konstancińska, Jaszowiecka, and Spalska Streets, being surrounded by the apartment buildings of the housing estate of Sadyba. Additionally, a bronze sculpture by Jarosław Urbański, titled The Locomotive, is placed at the corner of Powsińska and Okrężna Street. It depicts a small steam-powered locomotive, and commemorates the Wilanów Railway line, which crossed the neighbourhood at the turn of the 20th century. Sadyba also features the St. Thaddeus the Apostle Church, a Roman Catholic parish church, is located at 16 Goraszewska Street. The neighbourhood also includes the Czerniaków Cemetery, located at 44 and 46 Powsińska Street.

Bernardyńska Woda, a pond formed from the remains of a moat of the nearby Fort Che, dating to the 1880s, is located in the northwest of the neighbourhood, north to Idzikowskiego Street.

To the east, the Sadyba also borders the Czerniaków Lake, which, together with the surrounding area, has the status of a conservation area. With an area of 19.5 ha, it is the largest water lake in Warsaw. It is also a bathing lake with a beach, the only one in the city with such legal status.

Additionally, the neighbourhood includes the headquarters of the Institute of Food and Nutrition, located at 61 and 63 Powsińska Street.

== Location and boundaries ==
Sadyba is located in the city of Warsaw, Poland, within the north central portion of the Mokotów district, within the subregion of Lower Mokotów. Its boundaries are approximately determined to the north by Idzikowskiego Street, and Gołkowska Street; to the east by Koronowska Street, Jeziorna Street, Rembowski Square, Okrężna Street, and around houses at Rymanowska Street to the east; to the south by Augustówka Street, Wiertnicza Street, Goplańska Street, Niemirowska Street, and Nałęczowska Street; and to the west by Jana III Sobieskiego Street, and Witosa Street. The neighbourhood borders Czerniaków and Sielce to the north, Augustówka to the east, Wilanów Niski and Wilanów Wysoki to the south, and Stegny to the west.
