= Stanisław Dygat Park =

Urban park in Warsaw, Poland

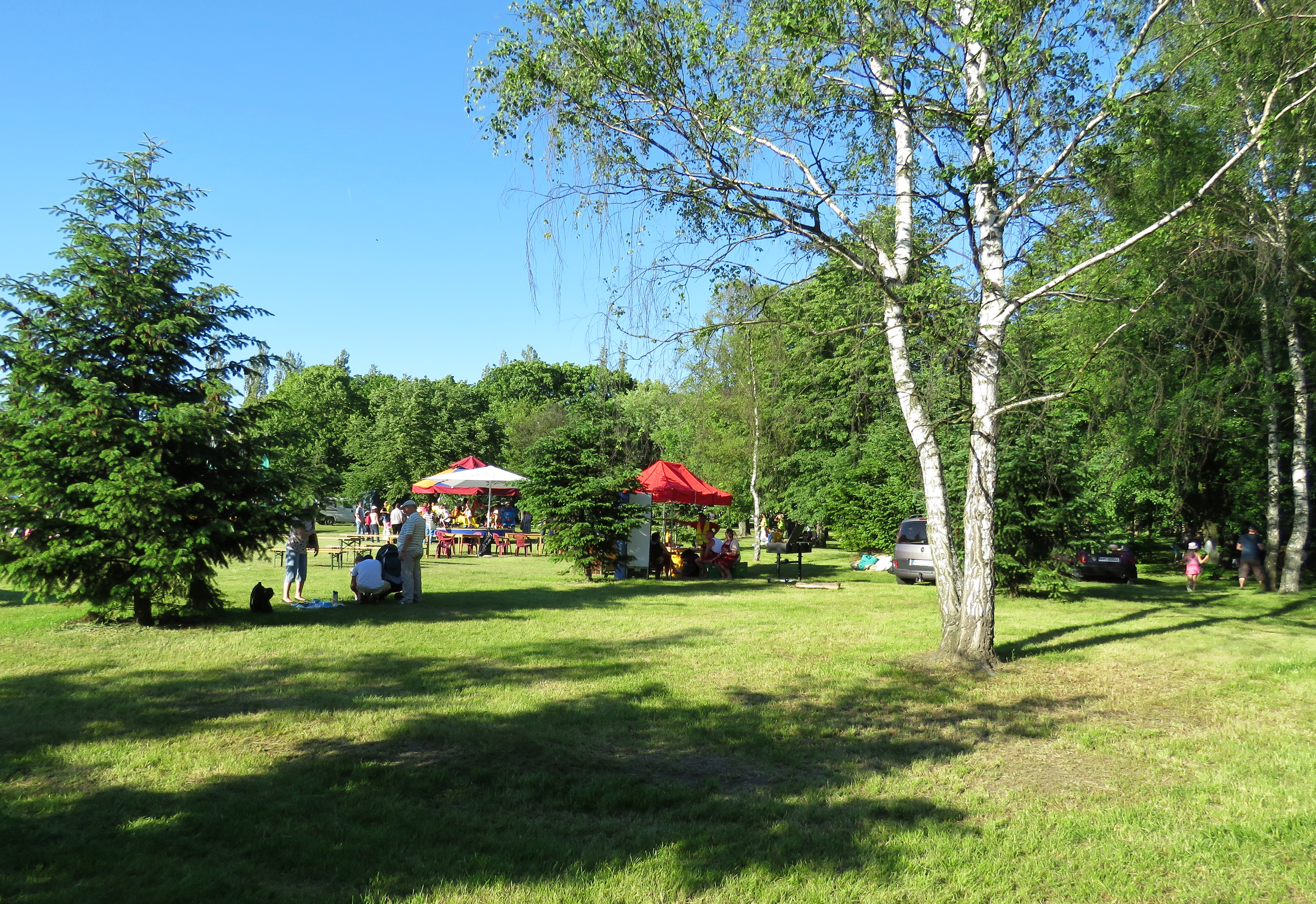
- The Stanisław Dygat Park in 2017.
- Interactive map of Stanisław Dygat Park
- Type: Urban park
- Location: Warsaw, Poland
- Coordinates: 52°11′13.06″N 21°03′21.35″E
- Area: 6.3 hectares (16 acres)
- Created: 2009

The Stanisław Dygat Park (Polish pronunciation: [staˈɲi.swaf ˈdɨ.ɡat]; Polish: Park im. Stanisława Dygata) is an urban park in Warsaw, Poland. It is located in the neighbourhood of Sadyba, within the district of Mokotów, between Limanowskiego Street, Konstancińska Street, Jaszowiecka Street, and Spalska Street. It was formed in the 1970s, and was officially given the status of a park in 2009.

== History ==
In the 1970s, the area of the current park was left undeveloped, as the place for potential further expansion during the construction of the neighbourhood of Sadyba. It began being used by local population as a garden square. In 2009, it was officially given the status of an urban park, and named after Stanisław Dygat, a writer who for 20 years lived in Mokotów.

== Characteristics ==
The park is located in the neighbourhood of Sadyba, within the district of Mokotów, between Limanowskiego Street, Konstancińska Street, Jaszowiecka Street, and Spalska Street. It has the total area of 6.3 ha.
