= Sielce =

Neighbourhood in Warsaw, Poland

- City Information System area (neighbourhood)
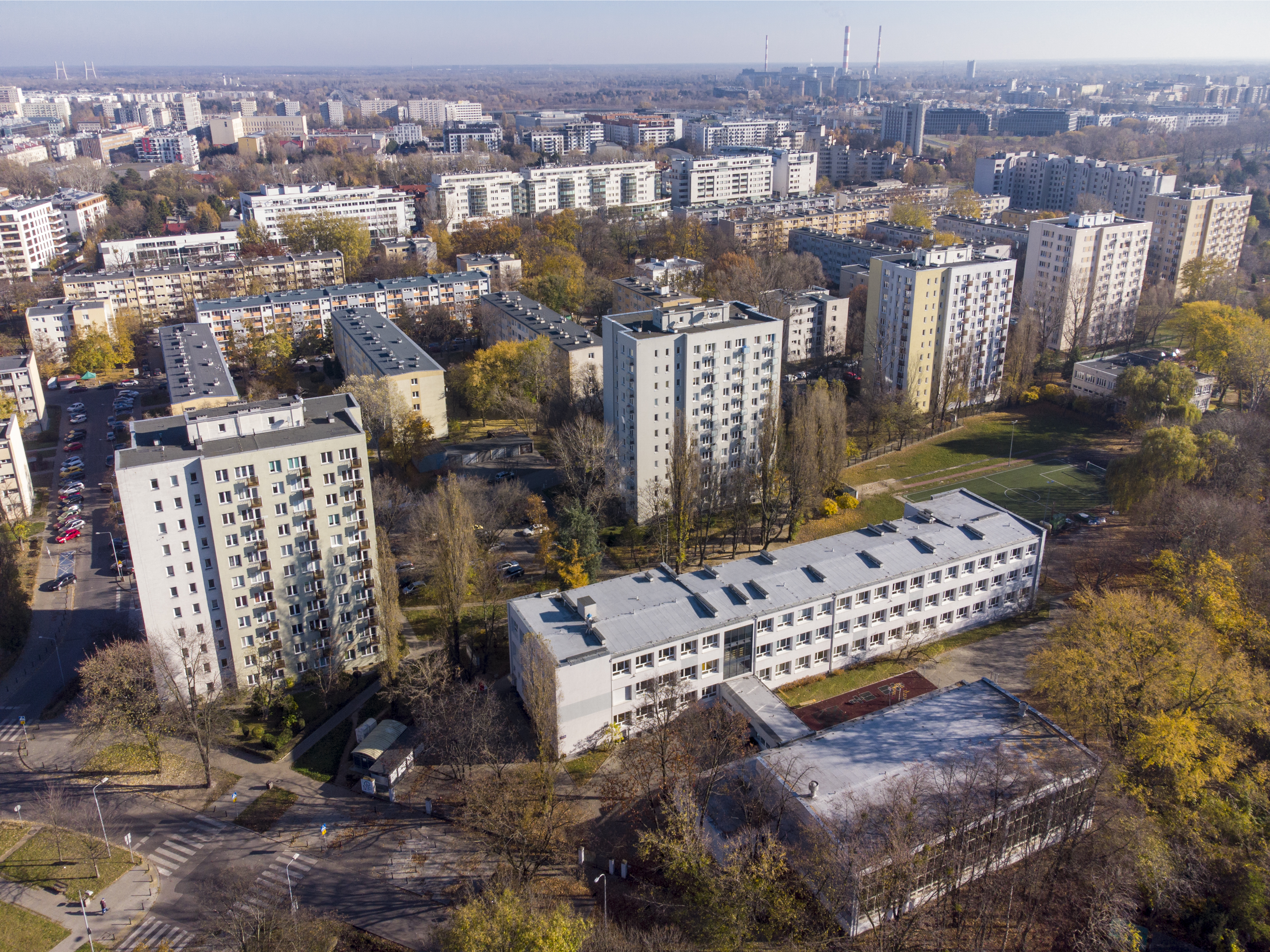
- Apartment buildings on Piaseczyńska Street in 2021.

- The location of Sielce within the Mokotów district.
- Coordinates: 52°12′29″N 21°05′00″E
- Country: Poland
- Voivodeship: Masovian
- City and county: Warsaw
- District: Mokotów
- Subdistrict: Lower Mokotów
- Time zone: UTC+1 (CET)
  - Summer (DST): UTC+2 (CEST)
- Area code: +48 22

Sielce (Polish: [ˈɕɛl.t͡sɛ]) is a neighbourhood, and a City Information System area, in Warsaw, Poland, within the Mokotów district. The area is part of its eastern half, known as the Lower Mokotów. Sielce is a residential neighbourhood with mixed low- and high-rise housing. It features several green areas, including the Arcadia Park, Eye of the Sea Park, and Sielce Park. The historic buildings in the neighbourhood include the Sielce Manor House, a neoclassical two-storey palace built in the 18th century, as well as the St. Joseph the Betrothed Church and the St. Casimir Church, built 1926 and 1934 respectively. The oldest records of Sielce, then a small farming community, date to 1412. It was incorporated into the city in 1916.

== Toponomy ==
The name Sielce, is an evolution of its original form, Siedlce, coming from Polish term zasiedlony, meaning settled.

== History ==
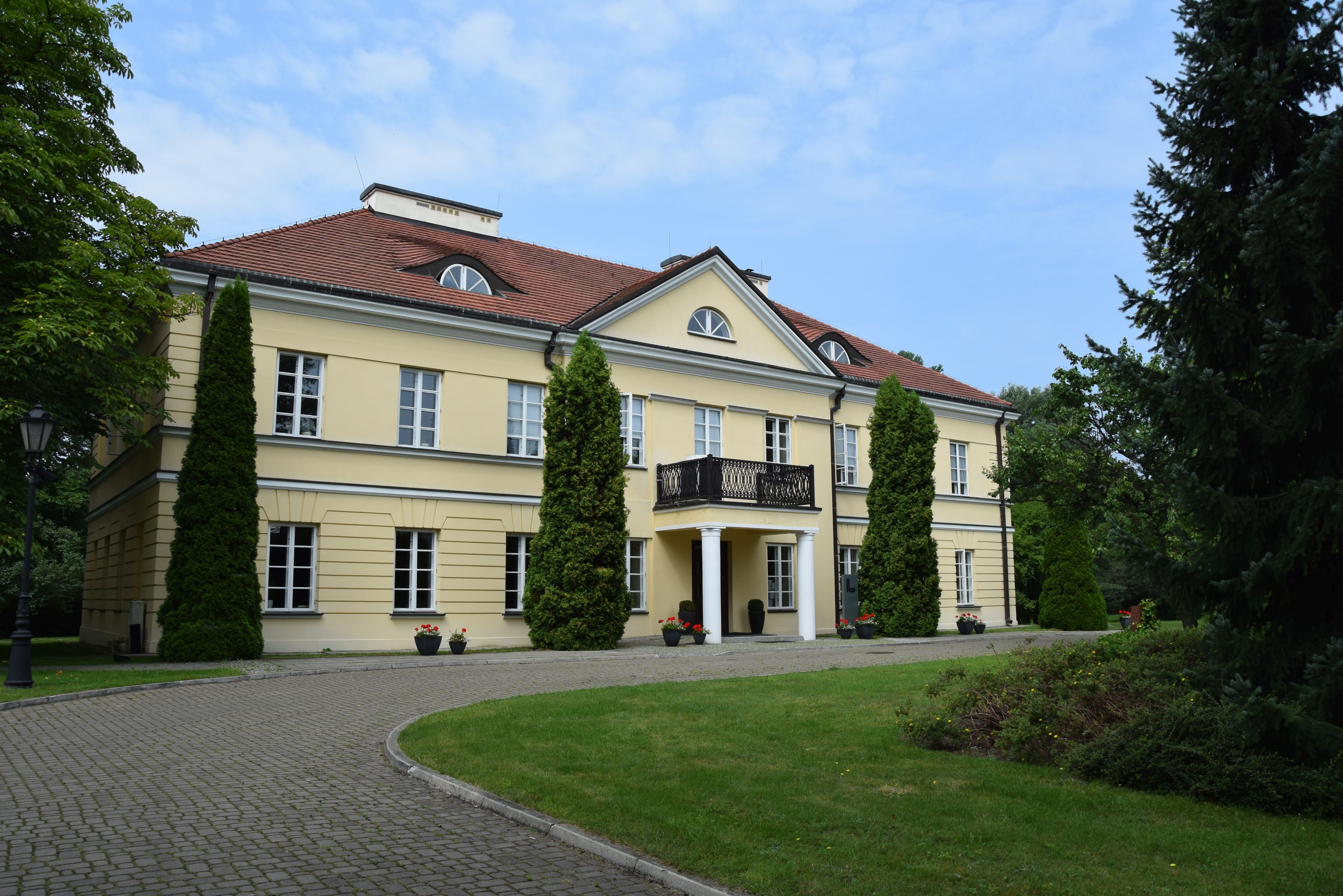
The Sielce Manor House, built in the 18th century.

The oldest records of Sielce, then known as Siedlce, date to 1412, when duke Janusz I the Old gave its ownership to the St. John Archcathedral. It remained in its possession until it was confiscated by the Prussian government, following the Third Partition of Poland in 1795. Sielce was a small farming community, probably originating as a part of the village of Czerniaków. In 1628, its farming estate had an area of 5 lans, equivalent to around 90 ha.

In 1680, nobleperson and politician Stanisław Herakliusz Lubomirski built his palace residence near the current Piaseczyńska Street, with a garden complex. In 1720, the area was bought by Augustus III of Poland, monarch of the Polish–Lithuanian Commonwealth, to use its natural water springs, to feed the water features of the Royal Baths park complex, via Piaseczno Ditch, dug from the pond Arcadia. In 1748, the land was acquired by nobleman, writer, and military officer Alois Friedrich von Brühl, who redeveloped it into a Baroque garden, named the Arcadia. At the end of the first half of the 19th century, the gardens surrounding the Rabbit House were redeveloped as an English landscape garden.

In 1770, the fortification lines known as the Lubomirski Ramparts were developed around Warsaw, crossing land to the north of Mokotów. By the beginning of the 18th century, a set of tollhouses was established at the entrance alongside Belwederska Street (then Belweder Road), known as the Belweder Tollhouses. Between 1818 and 1823, they were replaced with two new neoclassical pavilions.

In 1775, the village was leased to king Stanisław August Poniatowski, who founded there an English landscape garden centred around the Sielce Lake. In the second half of the 18th century the Sielce Manor House, a neoclassical two-storey palace, was built in the garden. Around 1860, a silkworm farm was established in the area.

In 1774, the Szuster Palace, together with a garden complex, were built to the northwest of Sielce, as a residence of princess Elżbieta Izabela Lubomirska. In 1820, the estate became property of nobleperson Anna Tyszkiewicz, and in 1845, it was bought by Franciszek Szuster, who then opened a popular holiday village in the area, named the Promenade (Polish: Promenada), with the gardens becoming its recreational green area. The park also included the Promenade Ponds, two artificial lakes formed from flooded clay pits. At the end of the 19th century, the Promenade amusement park was opened, with a luxury restaurant, circus, and open-air theatre among other attractions. It operated until the outbreak of the First World War, and again from its end until the beginning of the Second World War.

In the second half of the 19th century, a portion of Sielce belonged to Konstantin Pavlovich, the commander-in-chief of the Army of Congress Poland, and a member of the House of Romanov. Following his and his wife's deaths in 1831, the possession was left in their last will to his brother, Nicholas I, the Emperor of Russia and King of Poland. As such, it became a property of the Russian government, and remained in its possession until the independence of Poland in 1918.

In 1866, a portion of the lands of Sielce, which belonged to the estate of the Duchy of Łowicz, was partitioned and sold, leading to the formations of four new hamlets founded alongside Wilanów Road (now Jana III Sobieskiego Street). They were Jadzin, Marcelin, Stoczek, and Przylipie. On 13 January 1867, the area became part of the rural municipality of Mokotów, established as part of the administrative reform in the Kingdom of Poland. The municipality was incorporated into the city of Warsaw on 8 April 1916.

In 1891, the narrow-gauge tracks of the Wilanów Railway were built crossing the area along the current Chełmska Street, with a station in Marcelin. In 1894, the horsecars were replaced with steam locomotives. Amid the protest from the residents of Sielce against the noise caused by the trains, the route was altered to omit the village. In 1914, a tram line was briefly operated crossing the village, however, due to low demand, it was closed shortly after, and the tracks were removed. In 1921, Sielce was connected to the municipal transit system via a bus line, which was replaced with a tram line on Czerniakowska Street a year later. The line ended at the Bernardine Square in Czerniaków.

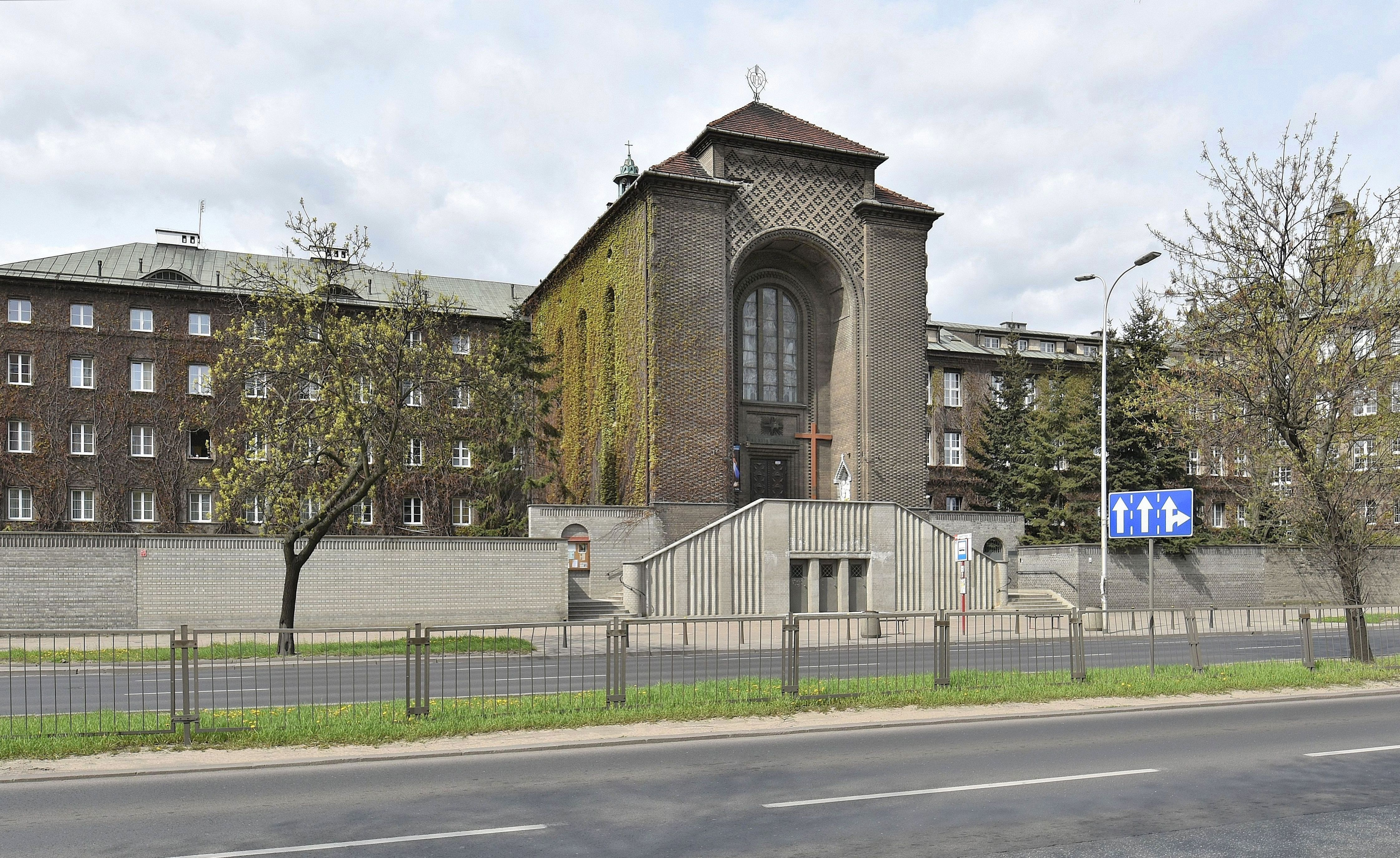
The St. Joseph the Betrothed Church, built in 1926.

In the interwar period, the area around Belwederska Street began to develop into a modern suburb. At the time, two Catholic churches were constructed in the area. This included the St. Joseph the Betrothed Church built at 137 Czerniakowska Street in 1926, and the St. Casimir Church, built at 21A Chełmska Street in 1934. In 1944, the neighbourhood became a battleground during the Warsaw Uprising. At night from 15 to 16 September, the Polish resistance partisans were pushed out of Sielce by the German soldiers, retreating to Upper Mokotów.

In 1949, Wytwórnia Filmów Dokumentalnych i Fabularnych (lit. 'Narrative and Documentary Film Studio'), one of the oldest continuously-operated film studios in Poland, was founded at 21 Chełmska Street.

Between 1953 and 1967, a series of housing estates were developed in the area. They were centred around Chełmska, Gagarina, and Sobieskiego Streets, and featured apartment buildings constructed with the large panel system technology. This included neighbourhoods of Chełmska, Dolna-Belwederska, Dolna-Piaseczyńska, Dolna-Sobieskiego, and Sielce, among others.

In 1956, the Czerniaków Hospital, featuring 8 wards, was opened at 19 and 25 Stępińska Street.

In 1960, the Chełmska bus depot was opened at the corner of Chełmska and Czerniakowska Streets. As the only one of the city, it stored the trolleybuses, until they were phased out in 1973. The depot operated until 2006 when it was demolished.

Throughout the 1960s and 1970s, the historic gardens in the area were redeveloped into the Arcadia Park, the Sielce Park, and the Eye of the Sea Park.

In 1974, Czerniakowska Street became part of Vistula Way, a thoroughfare crossing the city on the north–south axis. To facilitate the change, the tram tracks were removed from Czerniakowska Street, Gagarina Street, and Spacerowa Street in 1973.

In 1980, the brutalist bookstore pavilion, known as Uniwersus, was built at 20 and 22 Belwederska Street, and acclaimed for its design. In the 1990s, it was turned into an office building.

In 1991, the Tadeusz Koźluk Medical Academy of Warsaw, the first private university in the city, was founded at 9 Bobrowiecka Street.

In 1993, the Centrum Handlowe Panorama was opened at 31 Witosa Street, becoming the first shopping mall in the city.

On 4 October 1996, the Mokotów district was subdivided into twelve City Information System areas, with Sielce becoming one of them.

In 2002, the Agora Headquarters, a postmodernist office building was opened at 8 and 10 Czerska Street. It was acclaimed for its design, and is regarded as one of the best office building designs in the city. The same year, the Wajda School, a private film university, was founded at 21 Chełmska Street, by filmmakers Andrzej Wajda, Wojciech Marczewski, and Barbara Pec-Ślesicka.

In 2003, the Beit Warszawa Synagogue, which belongs to the Reform Jewish denomination, was founded in a house at 9 Stępińska Street.

In 2024, tram line tracks were opened alongside Belwederska Street, Jana III Sobiesdkiego Street, Spacerowa Street, and Gagarina Street.

== Characteristics ==
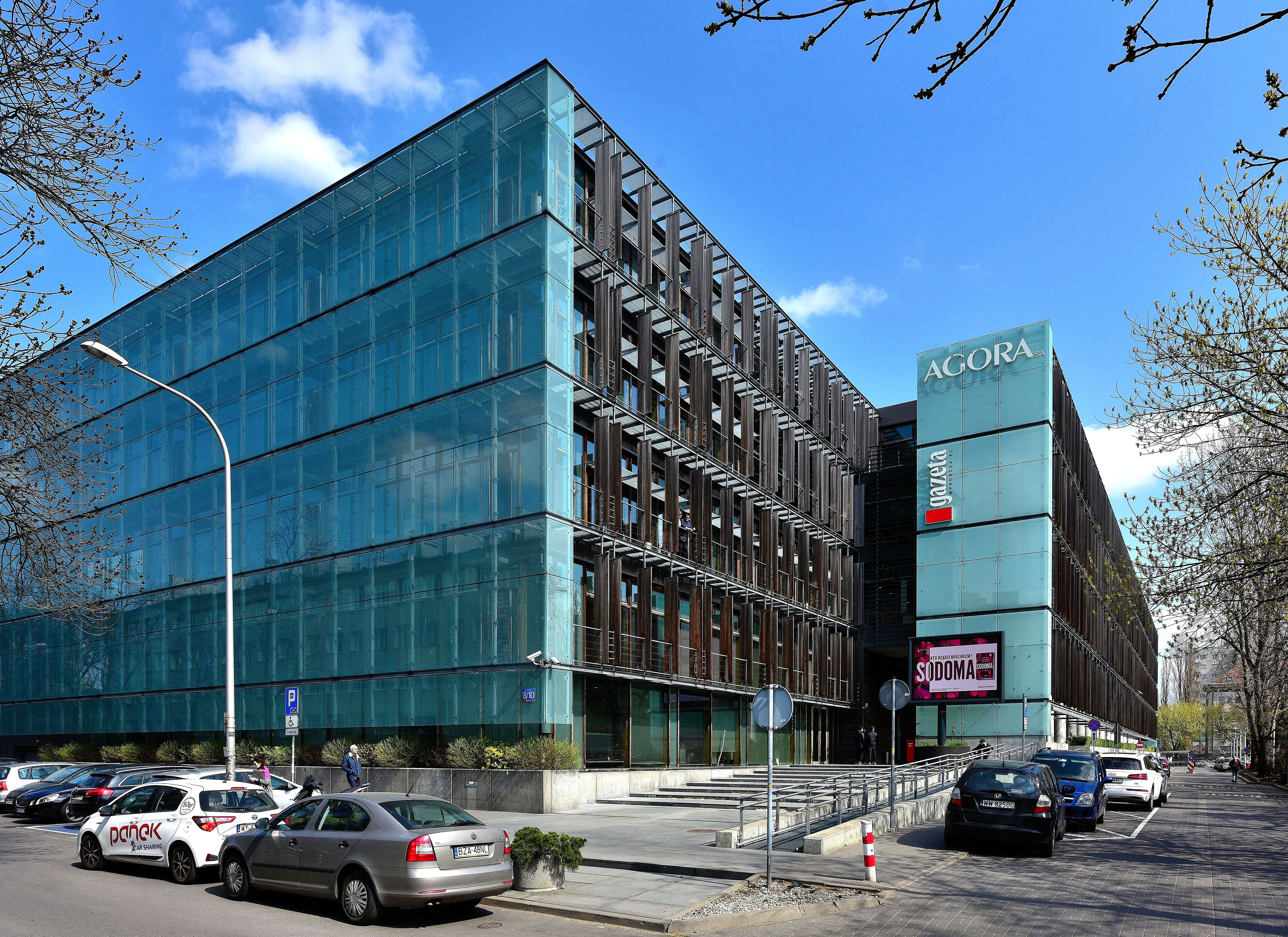
The Agora Headquarters, a postmodernist building, regarded as one of the best office building designs in Warsaw.

Sielce is a residential area with several housing estates of apartment buildings, mostly centred around Chełmska, Gagarina, and Sobieskiego Streets. This includes the neighbourhoods of Chełmska, Dolna-Belwederska, Dolna-Piaseczyńska, Dolna-Sobieskiego, and Sielce. Sielce also features several green areas, including the Arcadia Park, the Eye of the Sea Park, and the Sielce Park. The latter includes the Sielce Manor House, a historical a neoclassical two-storey palace built in the 18th century. The area also has several ponds, such as Arcadia, Promenade, Rabbit House, Sielce, and Warszawianka. It is also passed through by Piaseczno Ditch. The neighbourhood features the tracks of the tram network placed alongside Belwederska Street, Jana III Sobiesdkiego Street, Spacerowa Street, and Gagarina Street.

Sielce features two Catholic parish churches, the St. Joseph the Betrothed Church built at 137 Czerniakowska Street in 1926, and the St. Casimir Church built at 21A Chełmska Street in 1934, as well as the Beit Warszawa Synagogue at 9 Stępińska Street, which belongs to the Reform Jewish denomination.

The area also features two office buildings acclaimed for their design, Uniwersus, a historical brutalist bookstore pavilion dating to 1980, now an office building, at 20 and 22 Belwederska Street, and Agora Headquarters, a postmodernist building, at 8 and 10 Czerska Street, regarded as one of the best office building designs in the city. It also features Centrum Handlowe Panorama, at 31 Witosa Street, the first shopping mall in Warsaw, founded in 1993. Sielce also includes two private universities, the Tadeusz Koźluk Medical Academy of Warsaw at 9 Bobrowiecka Street, and the Wajda School, at 21 Chełmska Street. Additionally, the Czerniaków Hospital is located at 19 and 25 Stępińska Street. Wytwórnia Filmów Dokumentalnych i Fabularnych (lit. 'Narrative and Documentary Film Studio'), one of the oldest continuously-operated film studios in Poland, dating to 1949, also has its headquarters at 21 Chełmska Street.

Czerniakowska Street, which forms the neighbourhood's eastern border, is part of Vistula Way, a thoroughfare crossing the city on the north–south axis.

== Location and boundaries ==
Sielce is a City Information System area, located in the central north portion of the Mokotów district. Its boundaries are approximately determined by Gagarina Street, Podchorążych Street, and Nowosielecka Street to the north; Czerniakowska Street, and Witosa Avenue to the east; Idzikowskiego Street to the south; and the Warsaw Escarpment and around the Warszawianka sports complex to the west. The neighbourhood borders Ujazdów to the north, Czerniaków to the east, Sadyba and Stegny to the south, and Ksawerów, Old Mokotów, and Wierzbno to the west. Its nother boundary forms the border between the districts of Downtown and Mokotów.
