= Memorial to the Soldiers of the Peasant Battalions and the People's Union of Women =

Monument in Warsaw, Poland

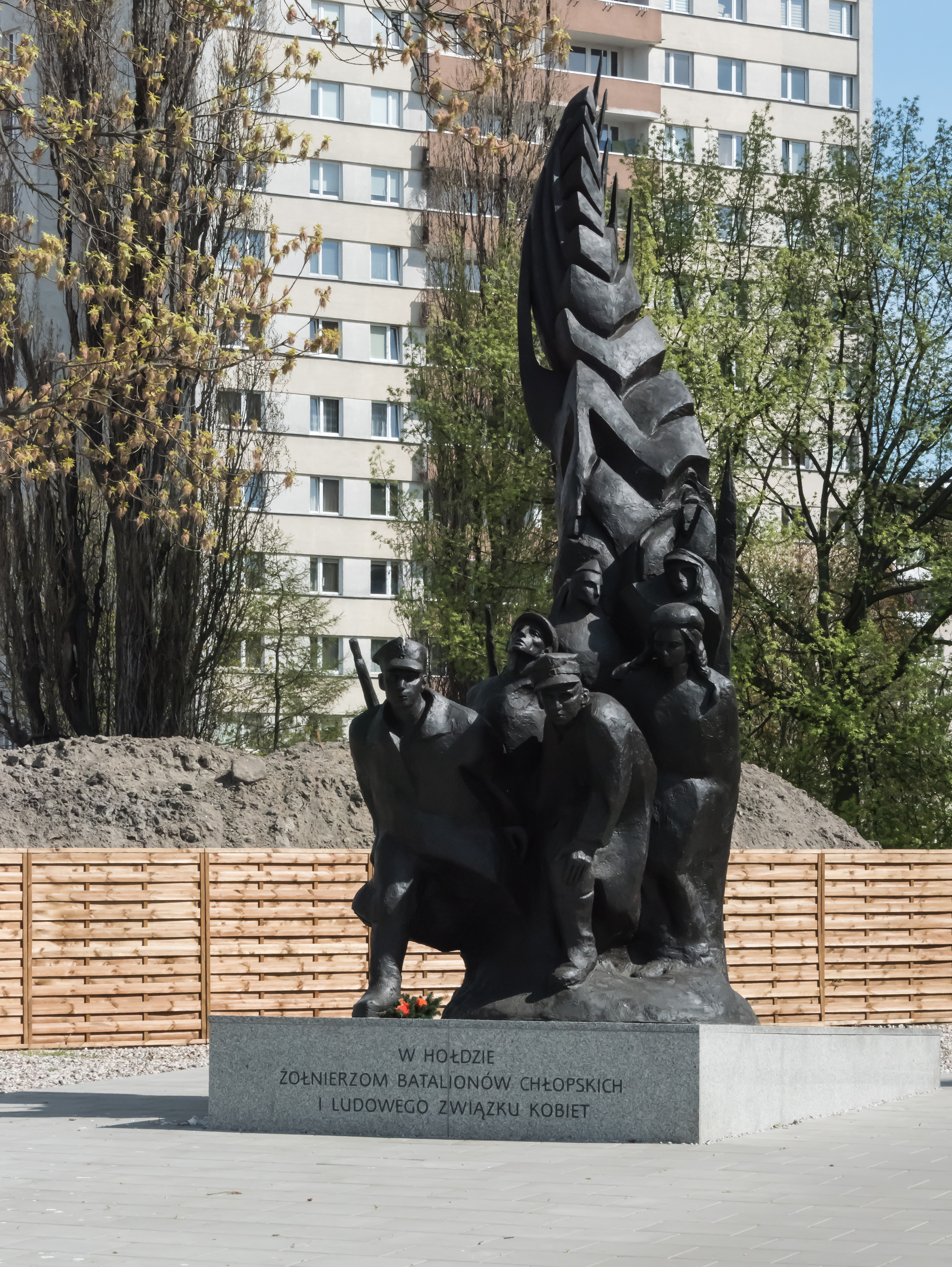
- The monument in 2020.
- Interactive map of Memorial to the Soldiers of the Peasant Battalions and the People's Union of Women
- Location: Mokotów, Warsaw, Poland
- Coordinates: 52°12′23.47″N 21°02′58.74″E
- Designer: Agnieszka Świerzowicz-Maślaniec; Marek Maślaniec
- Type: Sculpture
- Opening date: 8 October 2019

The Memorial to the Soldiers of the Peasant Battalions and the People's Union of Women (Note: Polish: Pomnik Żołnierzy Batalionów Chłopskich i Ludowego Związku Kobiet) is a monument in Warsaw, Poland. It is located at the intersection of Czerniakowska Street and Polski Walczącej Avenue, within the neighbourhood of Czerniaków in the district of Mokotów. The monument commemorates the soldiers of the Peasant Battalions and the People's Union of Women, resistance organisations active in Poland during the Second World War. It was designed by Agnieszka Świerzowicz-Maślaniec and Marek Maślaniec, and unveiled on 8 October 2019.

== History ==
The monument was initiated by the All-Poland Association of the Soldiers of the Peasant Battalions, designed by Agnieszka Świerzowicz-Maślaniec and Marek Maślaniec. It was presented to the general public on 8 October 2019, the 79th anniversary of the Peasant Battalions' formation.

== Characteristics ==
The monument commemorates soldiers of the Peasant Battalions and the People's Union of Women, resistance organisations active in Poland during the Second World War. It is placed at the intersection of Czerniakowska Street and Polski Walczącej Avenue, within the neighbourhood of Czerniaków in the district of Mokotów. The sculpture depicts group of marching soldiers and nurses. Behind them is placed a monumental ear of grain.
