= Wilanów III =

Neighbourhood of Warsaw, Poland

- Neighbourhood
- Interactive map of Wilanów III
- Coordinates: 52°10′12.72″N 21°04′23.88″E
- Country: Poland
- Voivodeship: Masovian
- City and county: Warsaw
- District: Wilanów
- CIS area: Wilanów Wysoki
- Time zone: UTC+1 (CET)
  - Summer (DST): UTC+2 (CEST)
- Area code: +48 22

Wilanów III (Polish: [viˈla.nuf ˈtʂɘ̟]), known coloquailly as the Bay of Red Pigs (Polish: Zatoka czerwonych świń, [zaˈtɔ.ka t͡ʂɛrˈvɔ.nɘ̟x ˈɕfiɲ]), is a housing estate in Warsaw, Poland, within the Wilanów district. It has an area of 11 ha, and is located within the City Information System area of Wilanów Wysoki, between Królowej Marysieński Street, Kosiarzy Street, Wilanowska Avenue, and Lentza Street. The neighbourhood is a mid- and high-rise residential area, predominantly consisting of apartment buildings constructed large panel system technique. It was developed in the 1980s by the Council of Ministers Office, with its apartments being mostly assigned to the politicians of the Polish United Workers' Party.

== History ==
Relicts of a human settlement, present in the area from the turn of the 12th to the 13th century, was discovered at the intersection of Sobieskiego Street, and Wilanowska Avenue, during the archeologist excavation conducted between 1976 and 1978. Forty objects were found, including huts with hearths, and farm buildings.

The area was incorporated into the city of Warsaw on 15 May 1951.

In the 1980s, the housing estate, designated as Wilanów III, was built between Królowej Marysieński Street, Kosiarzy Street, Wilanowska Avenue, and Lentza Street, on an area of 11 ha. It was developed by the Council of Ministers Office, on an area which was expropriated for the construction of a hospital in 1975. It consisted of mid- and high-rise apartment buildings, constructed with the large panel system technique, and designed by W. Piziarski, J. Semeniuk, among others architects. Majority of its apartments were assigned to the politicians of the Polish United Workers' Party, including Aleksander Kwaśniewski, Leszek Miller, Józef Oleksy, Jerzy Szmajdziński, and Janusz Zemke, among others. The housing estate became colloquially known by the public as the Bay of Red Pigs.

In 2006, the National Public Prosecutor's Office, from the request by the Internal Security Agency, begun an investigation into the owners of the apartments in buildings at Wiktorii Wiedeńskiej and Marconich Streets, within the housing estate of Wilanów III. They were sold by the city to the residents between 1996 and 1998, with prices greatly lower than their contemporary market value. Among investigated were high-ranking members of the government, including former president Aleksander Kwaśniewski, and former prime ministers Leszek Miller and Józef Oleksy. In 2008, the investigation was dismissed, in 41 cases due to lack of evidence, and in 4, due to the expiration of the statute of limitation.

On 26 September 2006, the Wilanów district was subdivided into eight City Information System areas, with the housing estate becoming part of the area of Wilanów Wysoki.

In 2024, the Polski Holding Nieruchomości holding company announced the plan to demolish 23 buildings in the housing estate, and built 16 new apartment buildings in their place, with somewhere between 600 and 800 apartments. The project was criticised by the politicians from local party The City Is Ours. Amid critisim, Polski Holding Nieruchomości canceled their plan, announcing to instead renovate already existing buildings.

== Characteristics ==
Wilanów III is a housing estate, with an area of 11 ha, located between Królowej Marysieński Street, Kosiarzy Street, Wilanowska Avenue, and Lentza Street. It is a mid- and high-rise residential area, predominantly consisting of apartment buildings constructed in the 1980s, using the large panel system technique. It is colloquially known as the Bay of Red Pigs, due to it being predominately inhabited by the politicians of the Polish United Workers' Party in the 1980s.
