= Sielce Park =

Urban park in Warsaw, Poland

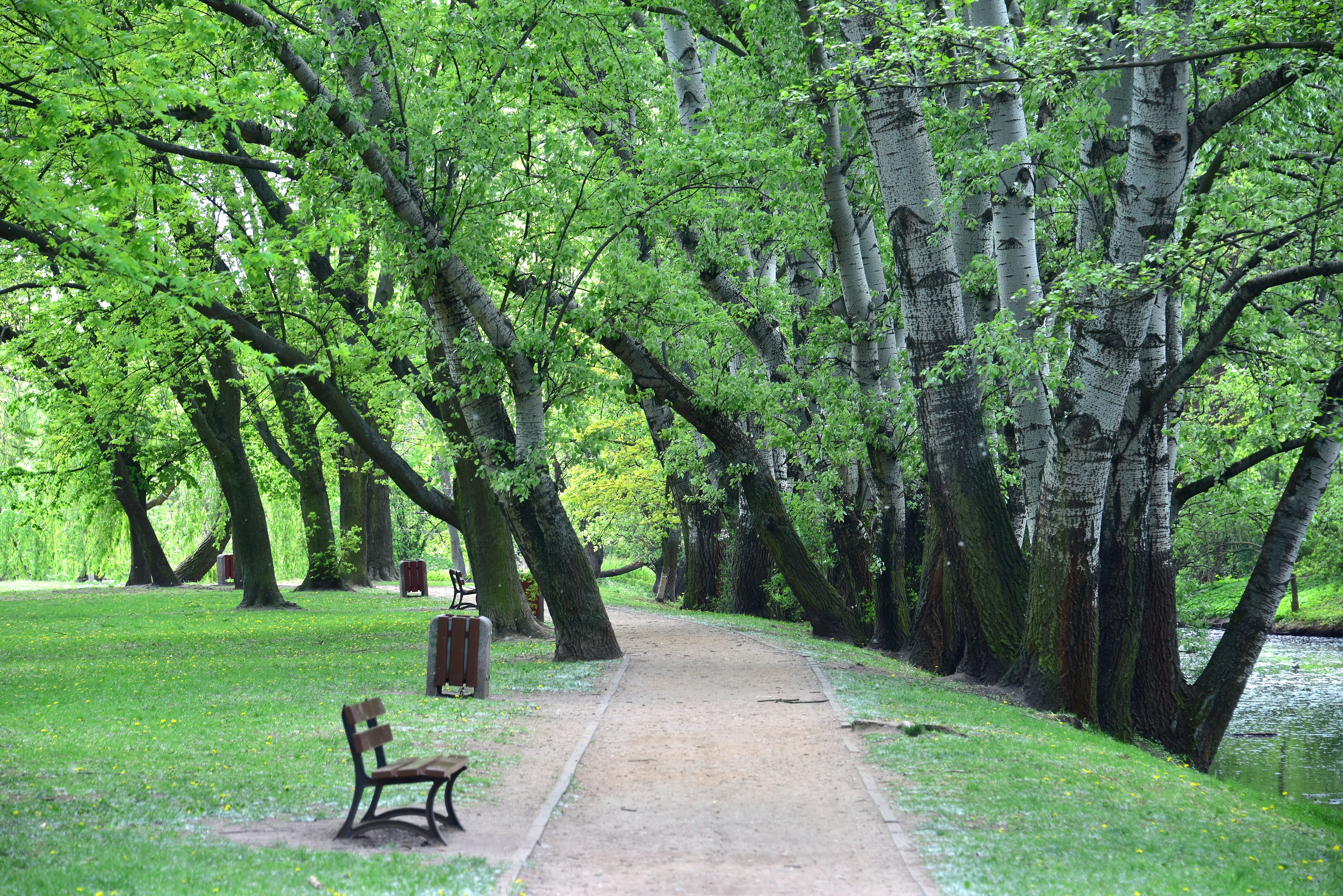
- The main park avenue in 2019.
- Interactive map of Sielce Park
- Type: Urban park
- Location: Mokotów, Warsaw, Poland
- Coordinates: 52°11′58.02″N 21°02′27.13″E
- Area: 3.16 hectares (7.8 acres)
- Created: 1775 (original form); 1960s (current form)
- Designer: Longin Majdecki

The Sielce Park (Polish pronunciation: [ˈɕɛl.t͡sɛ]; Polish: Park Sielecki) is an urban park in Warsaw, Poland. It is located in the neighbourhood of Sielce, within the district of Mokotów, and placed around the Sielce Lake, and next to Jana III Sobieskiego Avenue. The park was originally opened in 1775 as an English landscape garden, and was developed to its current form in the 1960s.

== History ==
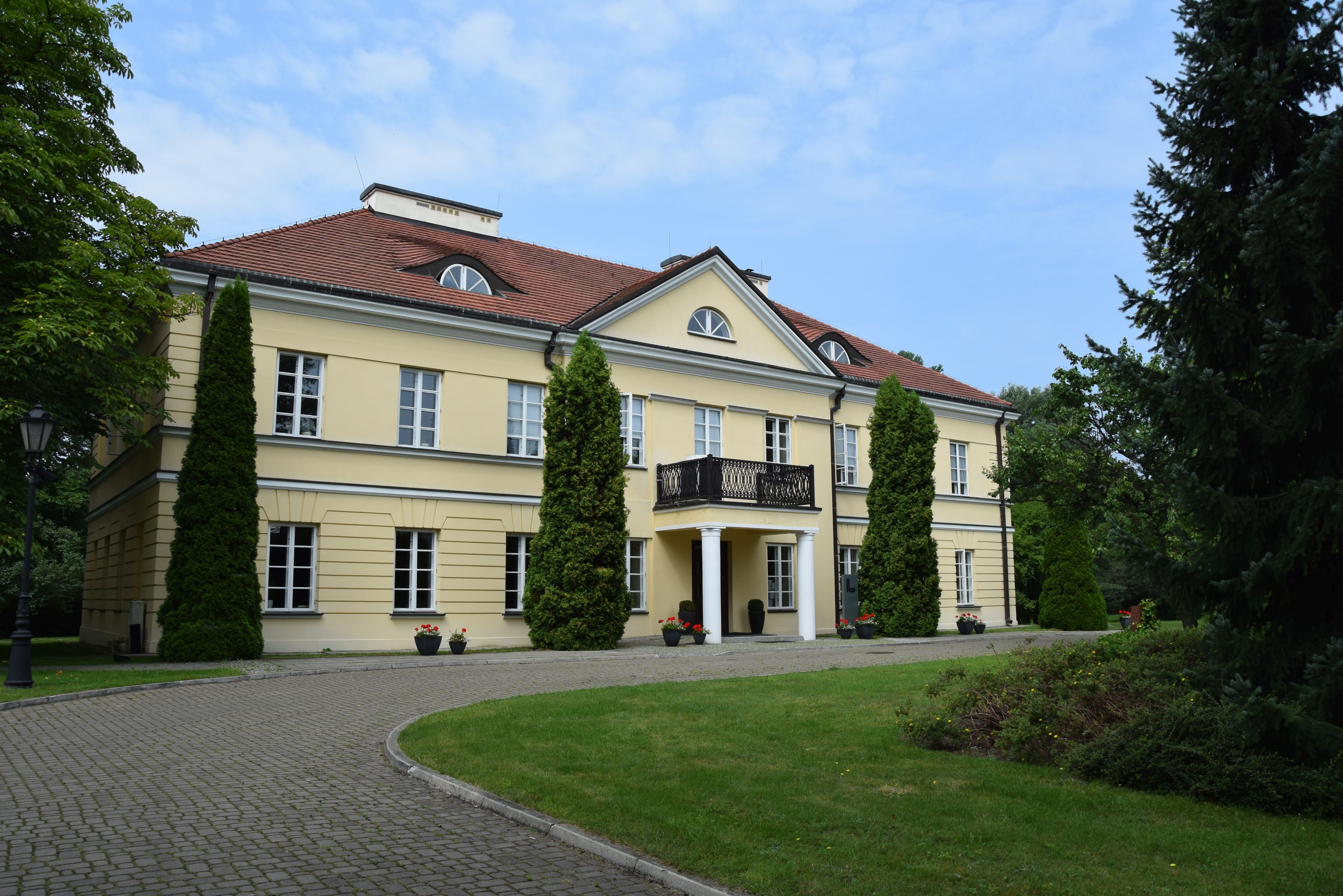
The Sielce Manor House in the park, constructed in the 18th century. Photography made in 2016.

In 1775, King Stanisław August Poniatowski founded there an English landscape garden centred around Sielce Lake. In the second half of the 18th century there was founded the Sielce Manor House, a two-storey palace built in the neoclassical style. In the second part of the 19th century, the area became part of the Belweder Palace estate. At the time there were also bred silkworms, used in the silk production.

The area was incorporated into Warsaw in 1916, and in the following decades, it was a popular urban park. Across years, its area decreased as its parts were built over. It was also heavily damaged during the First and Second World War.

The park was renovated and redeveloped in the 1960s, in accordance to the design by Longin Majdecki. Since 1965, it has the status of a protected cultural property.

== Characteristics ==
The park is located in the neighbourhood of Sielce, within the district of Mokotów. It is centred around Sielce Lake, and has a form of a long and thin stretching from north to south, between buildings at Jana III Sobieskiego Avenue, Chełmska Street, Cybulskiego Street, and Węgrzyna Street. It has the total area of 3.16 ha. The park has the status of a protected cultural property. Next to the park is located the Sielce Manor House, an 18th-century palace.
