= Stegny =

Neighbourhood in Warsaw, Poland

- City Information System area (neighbourhood)
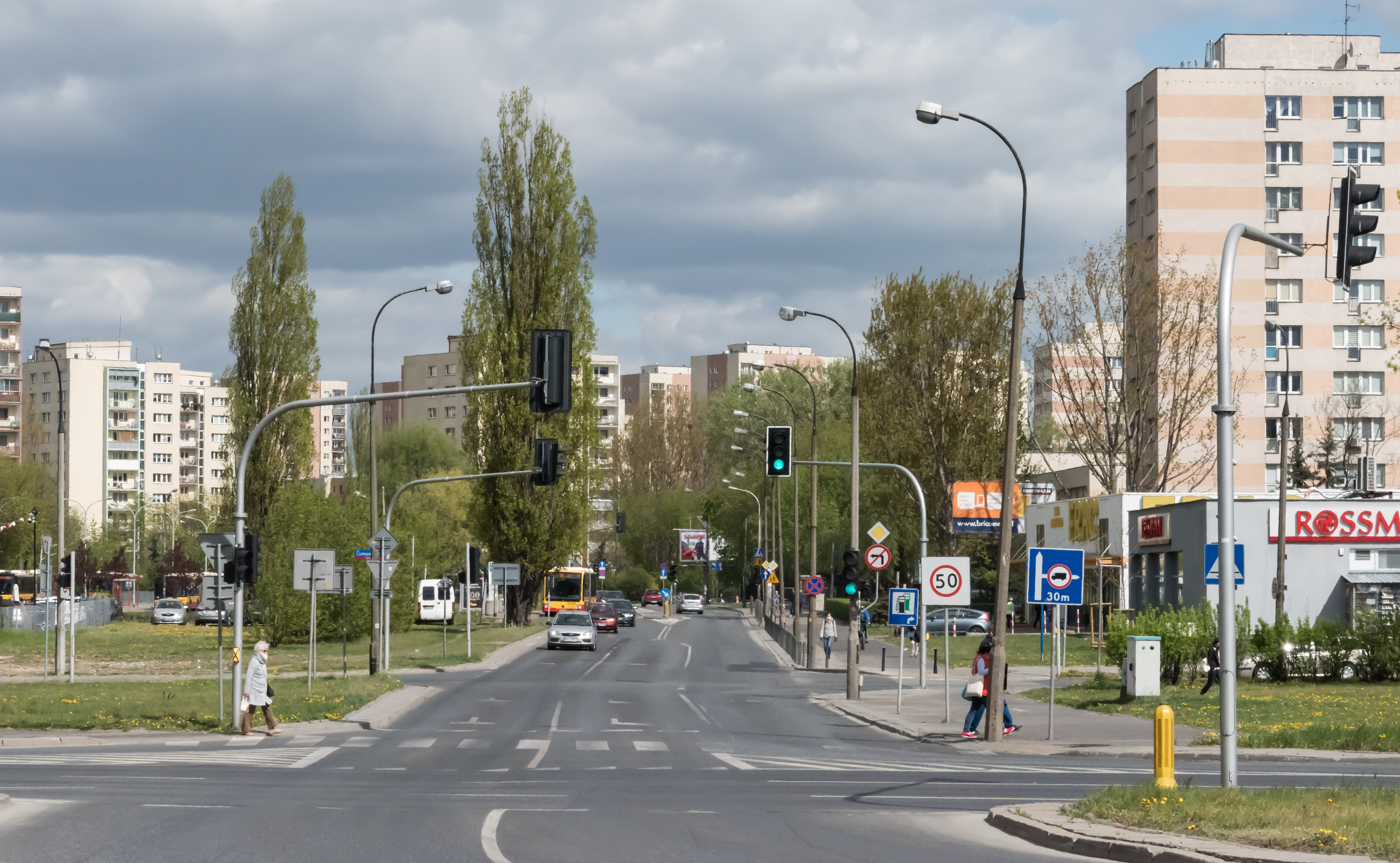
- Świętego Bonifacego Street in Stegny.

- The location of Augustówka within the Mokotów district.
- Coordinates: 52°10′40″N 21°02′53″E
- Country: Poland
- Voivodeship: Masovian
- City and county: Warsaw
- District: Mokotów
- Subregion: Lower Mokotów
- Time zone: UTC+1 (CET)
  - Summer (DST): UTC+2 (CEST)
- Area code: +48 22

Stegny (Polish: [ˈstɛɡ.nɘ̟]) is a neighbourhood, and a City Information System area, in Warsaw, Poland, within the Mokotów district. The area is part of its eastern half, known as the Lower Mokotów. It is a residential area, predominantly consisting of housing estates of apartment buildings, including Arbuzowa, Nova Królikarnia, Osiedle Ażurowych Okiennic, Stegny, and Wilanówek. It also includes low-rise single-family housing, predominantly in the neighbourhood of Królikarnia. Additionally, it features the Fort Che, historical demilitarised fortifications, dating to the 1880s.

In the 15th century, the village of Szopy was founded in the area of the Warsaw Escarpment. In the 18th century, it was settled by German population, being renamed to Szopy Niemieckie (lit. 'German Szopy'), with a hamlet of Szopy Polskie (lit. 'Szopy Polskie') being founded to the east by Polish people. At the beginning of the 19th century, the village of Potok was founded to its south. The area was incorporated into Warsaw in 1916. In the 1970s, the housing estate of Stegny was developed in the area, consisting of apartment buildings constructed with the large panel system technology. In the first half of the 21st century, series of another housing estates were developed in the area, including Arbuzowa, Nova Królikarnia, and Osiedle Ażurowych Okiennic.

== History ==
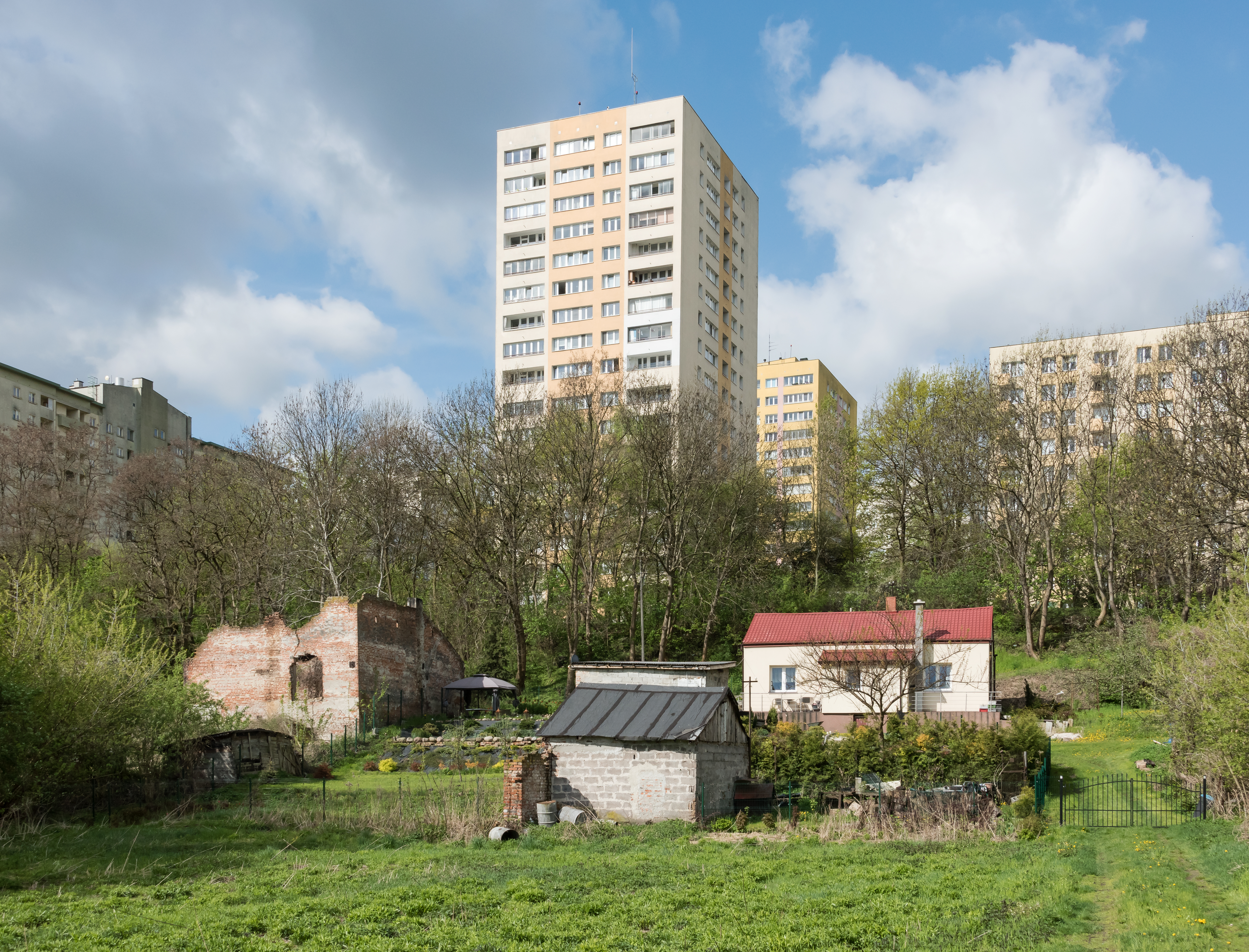
The remains of historical neighbourhood of Szopy at Bocheńska Street.

By 1456, the village of Szopy was recorded in the area to the west of the Warsaw Escarpment near the road connecting Warsaw with Puławy, now forming Puławska Street. The settlement was owned by the Szopski family, which belonged to the petty nobility. Since the first half of the 17th century, the settlement was owned by the Roman Catholic order of Discalced Carmelites. In 1795, as the area became part of the Kingdom of Prussia, Szopy was nationalised, and in the late 18th century, the government begun placing German settlers in the village, which became known as Szopy Niemieckie (lit. 'German Szopy'). The Polish population settled an area to the east of Warsaw Escarpment, naming their settlement as Szopy Polskie (lit. 'Polish Shopy'). To the north of Szopy Polskie, was also founded Szopy Francuskie (lit. 'French Szopy'), settled by a French population. A few remaining historical buildings of Szopy Polskie survive in the area of Bocheńska and Jaśminowa Streets.

On 13 January 1867, the area, including Szopy Niemieckie and Szopy Polskie, became part of the rural municipality of Mokotów, established as part of the administrative reform in the Kingdom of Poland. The municipality was incorporated into the city of Warsaw on 8 April 1916. In 1909, it was transferred to the municipality of Wilanów. Szopy Niemieckie and Szopy Polskie were incorporated into the city of Warsaw on 8 April 1916.

At the beginning of the 19th century, the village of Potok was founded alongside a road now forming Potoki Street. In 1887, it had 63 residents. It was incorporated into Warsaw on 27 September 1938.

In the 1880s, the Fort Che, later renamed to the Piłsudski Fort in 1928, was constructed by the Russian Imperial Army as part of the Warsaw Fortress, a series of fortifications surrounding the city. After 1892, it was primary used as a military warehouse, and in 1909, it was decommissioned. During the interwar period, it houses an ammunition factory. In the 1930s, the surrounding area was parceled and sold for the construction of single-family housing, expanding the nearby neighbourhood of Królikarnia. During the Second World War, soldiers of the Polish Land Forces defended themselves in the fort until its capture on 25 September 1939. It was again used during the Warsaw Uprising in 1944 by the Polish resistance before being captured on 15 September.

In 1959, a small ski jumping venue was opened at 3 Czerniowiecka Street. It was operated by the Warsaw Ski Club, and had the construction point at 38 m (124.67 ft). It was mostly used as a training venue and occasionally hosted ski jumping competitions. It was modernised between 1975 and 1980. The last competition was hosted there in 1989, with it continuing to serve as a training venue until the early 1990s, after which it stopped being used. It was deconstructed between 2010 and 2011.

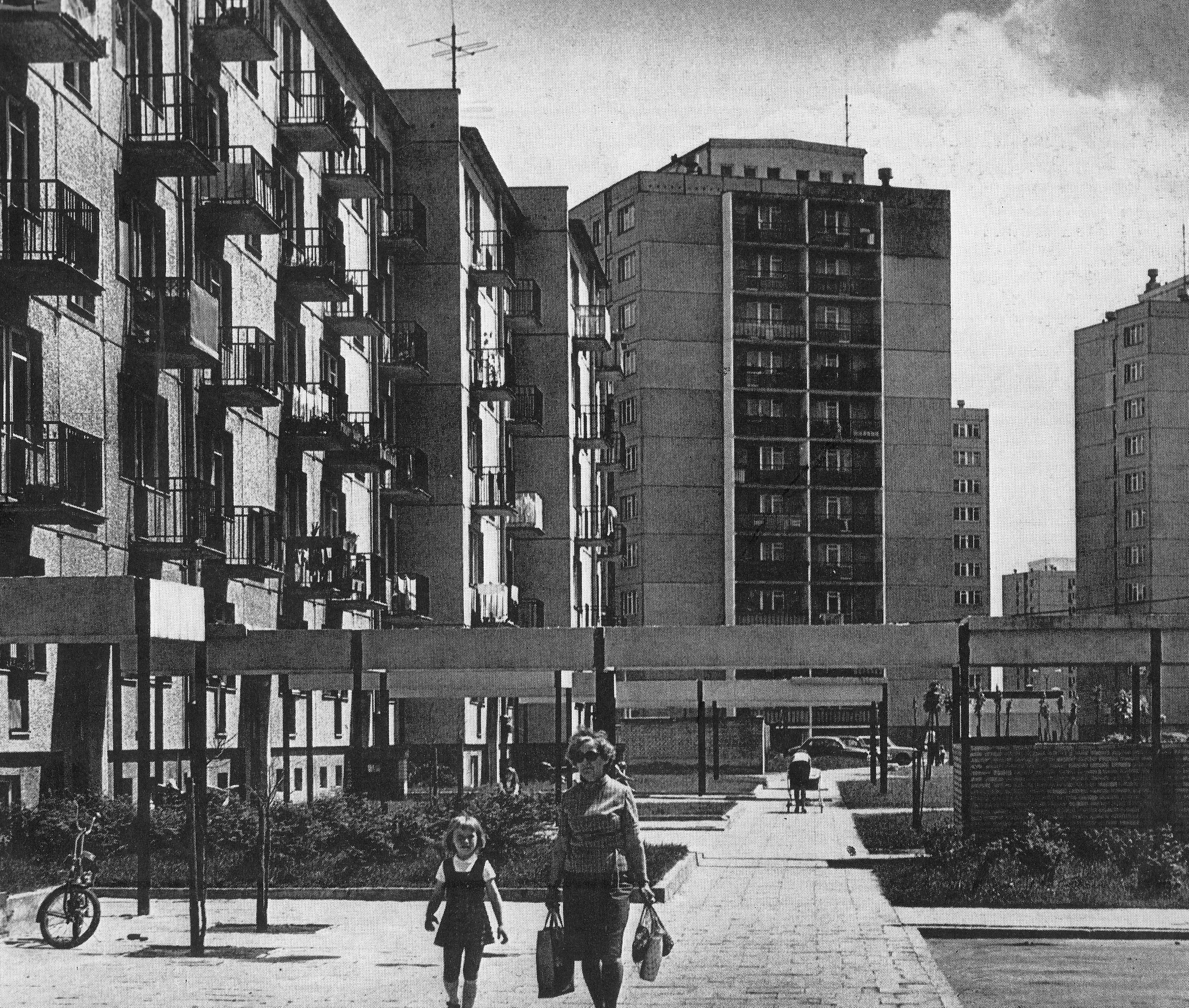
The apartments buildings in Stegny in the 1970s.

Between 1971 and 1977, the housing estate of Stegny was developed in the area of 75 ha. It consisted of apartment buildings, constated with the large panel system technology. The buildings were made from prefabricated components, manufactured in the Służewiec House Factory (Polish: Fabryka Domów „Służewiec”). The neighbourhood was designed by Jadwiga Grębecka, Jan Szpakowicz, and Romuald Welder, with the project receiving the Minister of Constitution Award. In January 1975, the one-millionth public housing unit in the Polish People's Republic, and simultaneously the 150-thousandth unit in Warsaw, was assigned in the building at 3 Marylska Street. The event was commemorated with a plaque installed on the building's façade.

In 1973, the Institute of Psychiatry and Neurology was opened at 5 Sobieskiego Street.

In 1979, the Stegny speed skating rink was opened at 1 Inspektowa Street, featuring a track with dimensions of 400 m × 11 m. Prior to this, a natural ice rink operated at the location.

In 1989, wooden blacksmiths building was built at 84 Przy Grobli Street, which since the late 1990s houses the Museum of Blacksmithing.

Between 1980 and 1993, the housing estate of Wilanówek was developed in area between Wilanowska Avenue, Jana III Sobieskiego Street, and Śródziemnomorska Street. It consisted of terraced houses and apartment buildings.

Between 1981 and 1993, the Church of the Most Holy Virgin Mary the Mother of Divine Mercy was built at 9 Świętego Bonifacego Street, and between 1999 and 2003, the St. Anthony Maria Zaccaria Church was built at 15 Sobieskiego Street. Both belong to the Roman Catholic denomination. Between 1986 and 1992, the housing estate of Arbuzowa, consisting of apartment buildings constructed with the large panel system technology. It was designed by Jolanta Lipińska and Marek Mirski. The neighbourhood is located between Wilanowska Avenue, Patkowskiego Street, Służewiec Stream.

On 4 October 1996, the Mokotów district was subdivided into twelve City Information System areas, with Stegny becoming one of them.

Between 2006 and 2014, the housing estate of Osiedle Ażurowych Okiennic (lit. 'Openwork Shutters Estate') was constructed between Przy Grobli Street, Patkowskiego Street, and Wilanowska Avenue, consisting of 13 apartment buildings, varying in height between 4 and 7 storeys, and characterized by their wooden window blinds installed on their façades.

The Fort Che was sold in 2007 by the Polish Armed Forces to the private investors. Between 2017 and 2018, it was redeveloped as an apartment hotel, a series of with neomodernist residential buildings being developed in the complex. The historical fort barracks were also restored as a shopping centre with restaurants and cultural institutions.

Beginning in 2016, and continuing throughout the 2010s and 2020s, the housing estate of Nova Królikarnia is being developed to the east of Sikorskiego Avenue, and to the north of Wilanowska Avenue. Designed following the principles of the garden city movement, it consists of a series of the modernist apartment buildings.

In 2024, tram line tracks were opened alongside Jana III Sobieskiego Street, and in 2025, theg were also built alongside Świętego Bonifacego Street, ending with a turning loop.

== Characteristics ==
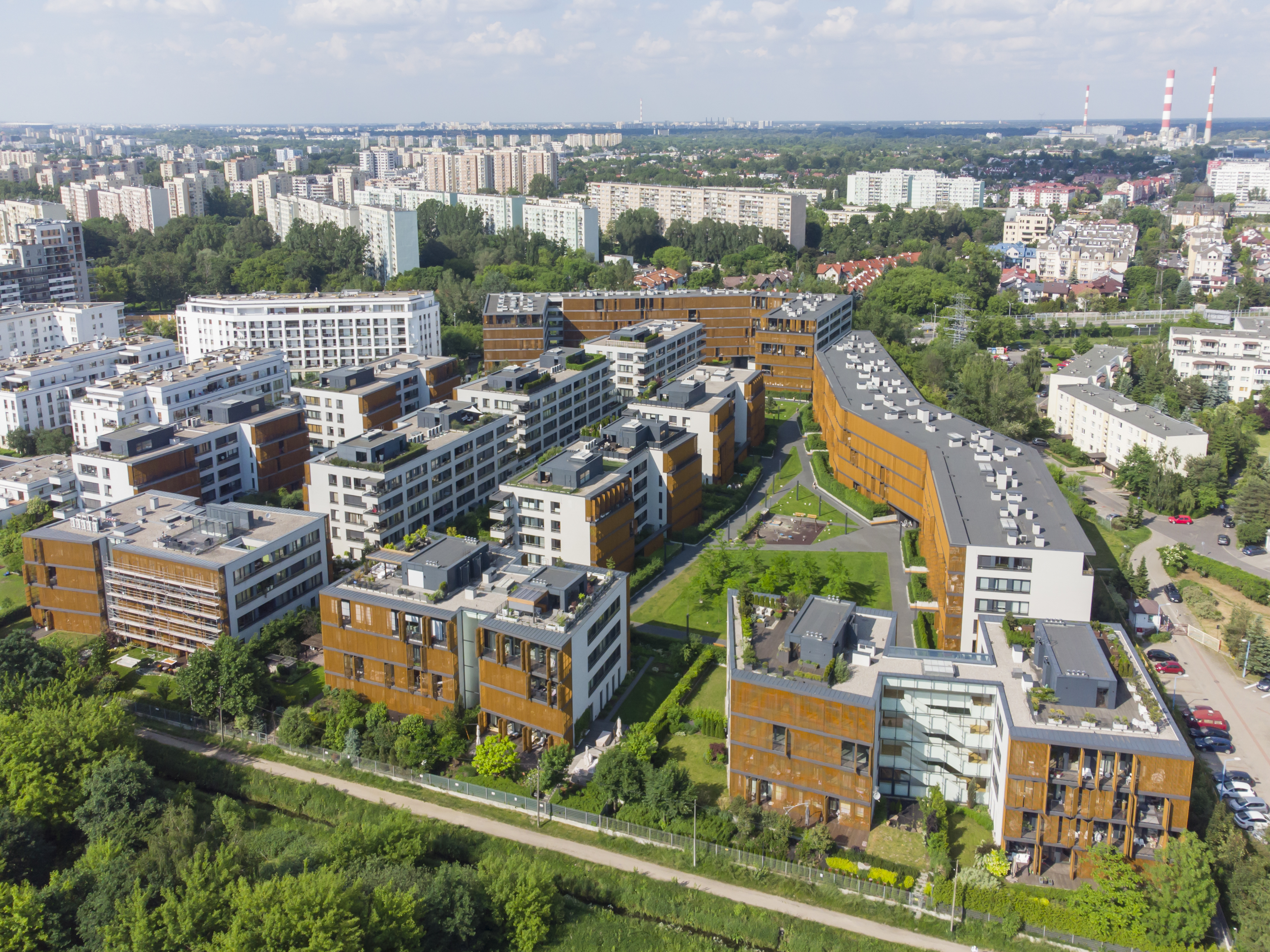
Osiedle Ażurowych Okiennic.

Stegny is a residential area. In the east of Sikorskiego Avenue, it is dominated by the housing estate of Stegny, consisting of high-rise apartment buidlings, dating to the 1970s. To the west, it features the housing estate of Nova Królikarnia, consisting of modernist apartment buildings developed in the 2010s and 2020s. It also includes small neighbourhoods of Szopy and Potok, both consisting of a few houses in the area of Boheńska and Potocki Street, and a portion of the neighbourhood of Królikarnia near Idzikowskiego Street and Warsaw Escarpment, consisting of single-family housing. To the south of Wilanowska Avenue, the area also includes the housing estates of Arbuzowa, Osiedle Ażurowych Okiennic (lit. 'Openwork Shutters Estate'), and Wilanówek, predominantly consisting of apartment buildings. In the north, it also includes a series of neomodernist residential buildings on Idzikowskiego Street, forming an apartment hotel centred around the Fort Che, historical demilitarised fortifications, which barracks now served as a shopping centre. The area is crossed through by the tram line tracks placed alongside Jana III Sobieskiego Street and Świętego Bonifacego Street, the latter ending with a turning loop.

The neighbourhood features the Stegny speed skating rink at 1 Inspektowa Street, with track dimensions of 400 m × 11 m. Additionally, it also housed the Institute of Psychiatry and Neurology at 5 Sobieskiego Street, and Museum of Blacksmithing at 84 Przy Grobli Street. Stegny also has two Roman Catholic parish churches. They are the Church of the Most Holy Virgin Mary the Mother of Divine Mercy at 9 Świętego Bonifacego Street and St. Anthony Maria Zaccaria Church at 15 Sobieskiego Street.

Its southern boundary is marked by the Służewiec Stream, and its western boundary by the peaks of the Warsaw Escarpment.

== Location and boundaries ==
Stegny is located in the city of Warsaw, Poland, within the south central portion of the Mokotów district, within the subregion of Lower Mokotów. Its boundaries are approximately determined to the north by Idzikowskiego Street, to the east by Jana III Sobieskiego Street; to the south by the Służewiec Stream, Fosa Street, and Wilanowska Avenue, and to the west by the Warsaw Escarpment and Idzikowskiego Street. The neighbourhood borders Sielce to the north, Sadyba to the east, Błonia Wilanowskie, Służew, and Stary Służew to the south, and Ksawerów to the west.
