= Andrzej Górski =

Polish noble (died 1626)

Nałęcz coat of arms

Andrzej Górski h. Nałęcz (died 1626) was Treasurer of the Crown, voivode of Masovia from 1623, castellan of Kamieniec from 1619, starost of Ovruch and Strzelce, diplomat.

At the time of the Zebrzydowski Rebellion he supported King Sigismund III Vasa who sent him twice as a delegate to the negotiations with the Rokosz. In 1613 he headed the envoy to the Ottoman Empire. He was appointed administrator of the salt mines of Wieliczka in 1620.

== Marriage and issue ==
Andrzej was married to Elżbieta Niezabitowska h. Lubicz. Later he married Helena Zamoyska and had one child:

- Teofilia Górska, was married to stolnik and castellan of Sieradz Wojciech Łubieński h. Pomian and later to miecznik of Kalisz Władysław Mycielski h. Dołęga.

== Bibliography ==
- Sławomira Peleszowa, Andrzej Górski, w: Polski Słownik Biograficzny, 1959–1960, t. VIII, s. 433-434.
