= Lower Mokotów =

Area in Warsaw, Poland

- Neighbourhood
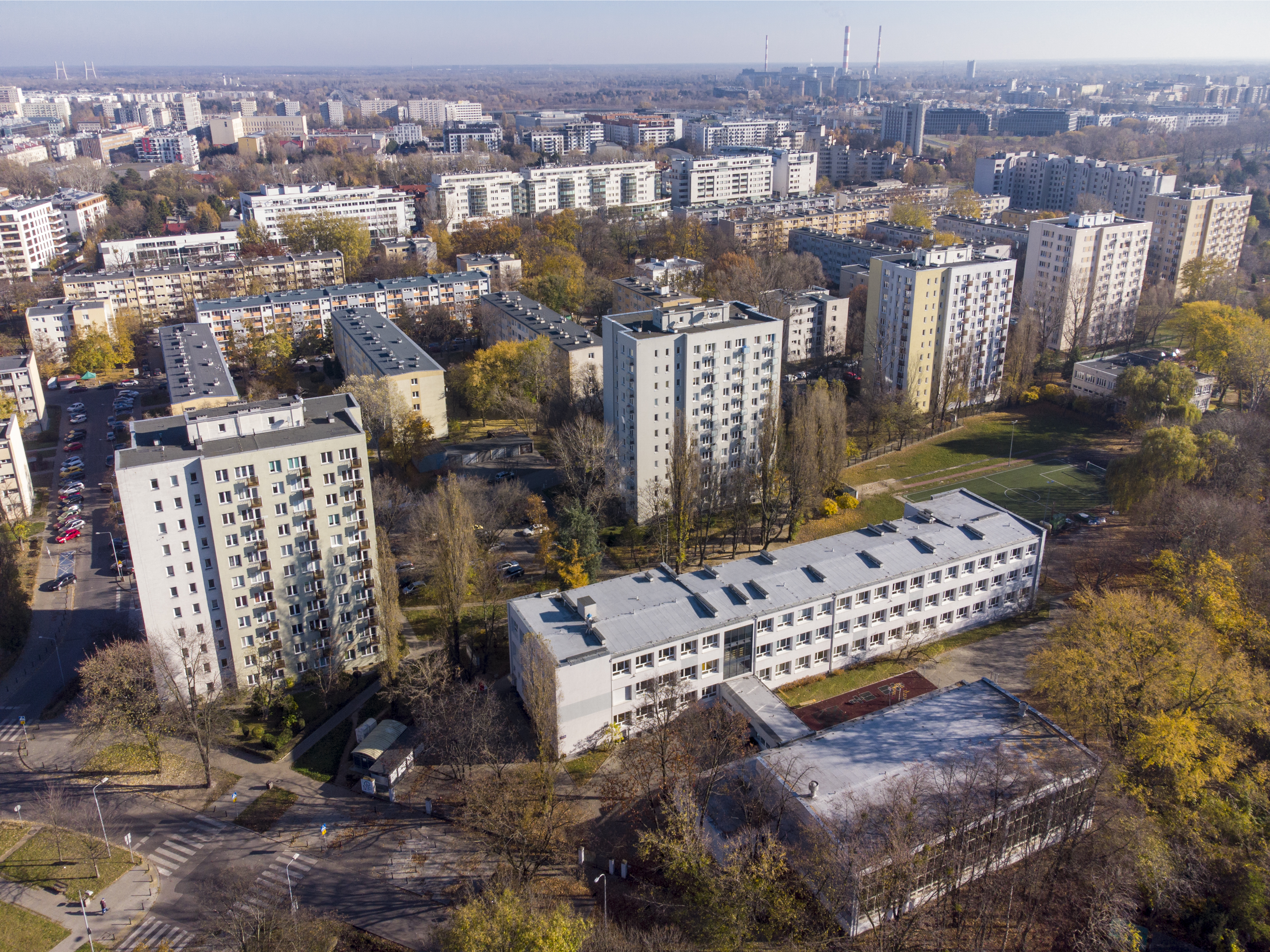
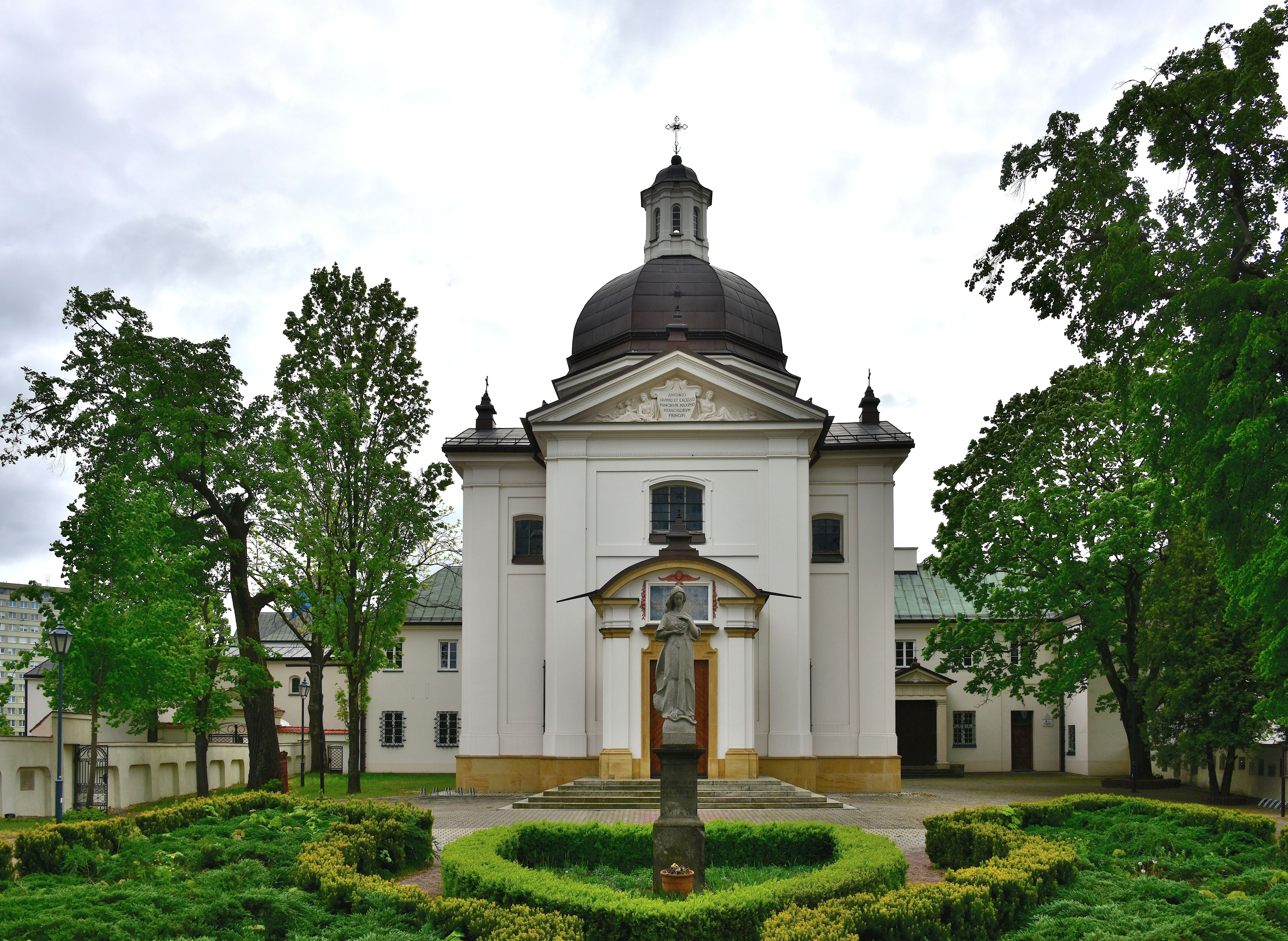
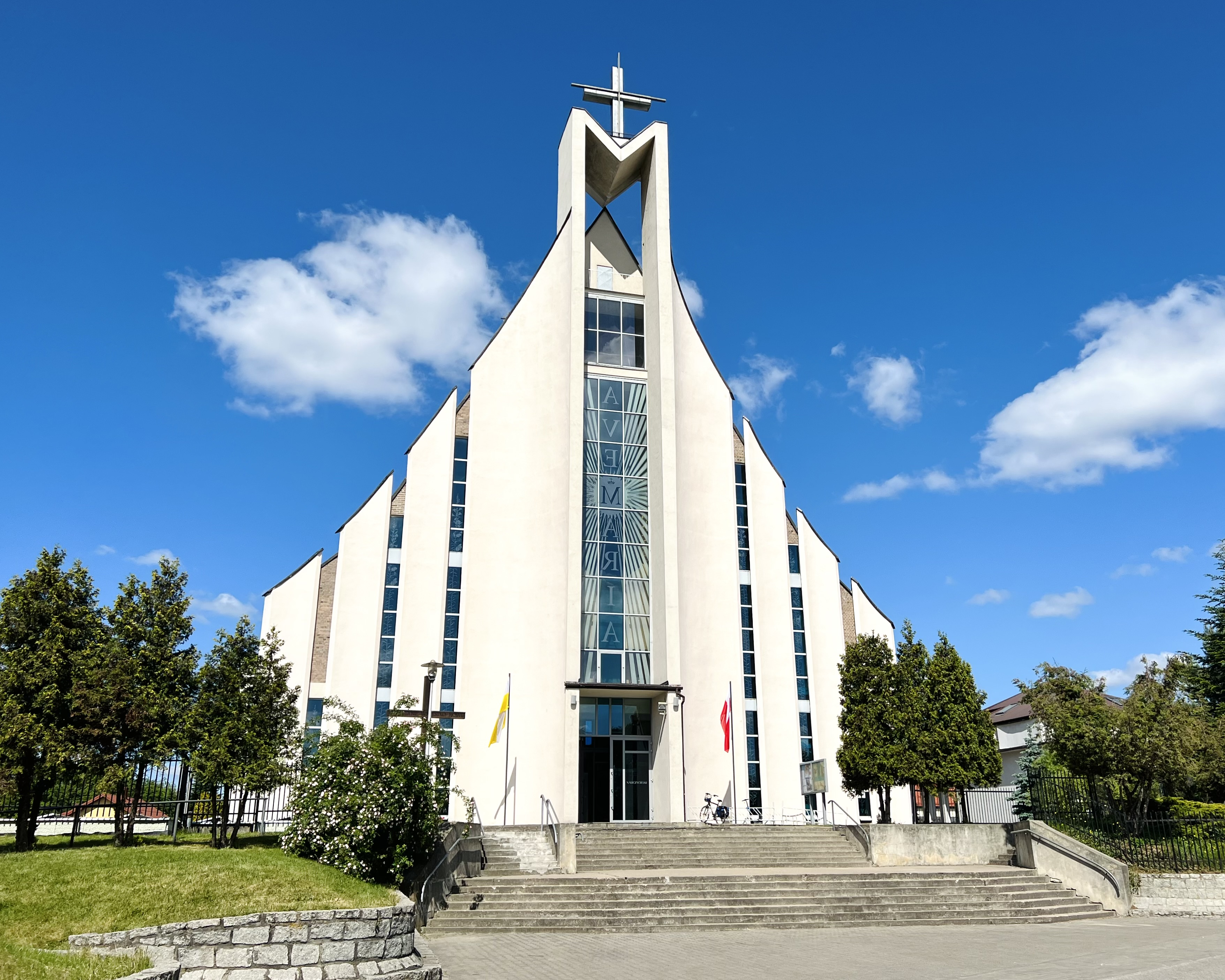
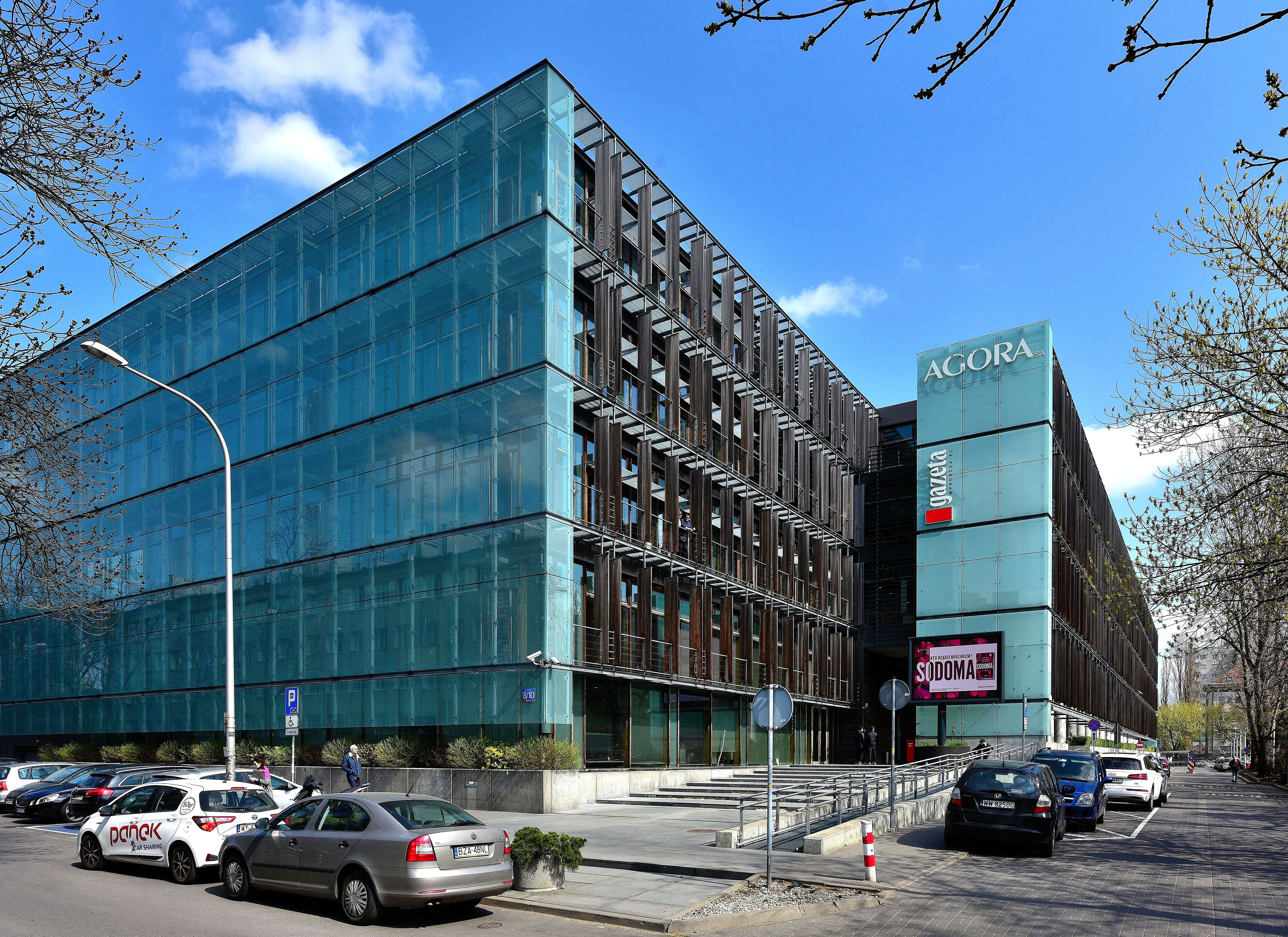
- Apartment buildings in Czerniaków St. Anthony of Padua Church Sanctuary of Our Lady the Teacher of the Youth Agora Headquarters
- Interactive map of Lower Mokotów
- Coordinates: 52°11′47″N 21°03′41″E
- Country: Poland
- Voivodeship: Masovian
- City and county: Warsaw
- District: Mokotów
- Time zone: UTC+1 (CET)
  - Summer (DST): UTC+2 (CEST)
- Area code: +48 22

Lower Mokotów (Polish: Dolny Mokotów, [ˈdɔl.nɘ̟ mɔˈkɔ.tuf]) is an area in the city of Warsaw, Poland, forming the eastern side of the Mokotów district. It contains six out of its twelve City Information System areas, which are: Augustówka, Czerniaków, Sadyba, Siekierki, Sielce, and Stegny. Lower Mokotów is a residential area, dominated by high-rise housing with apartment buildings. It includes the neighbourhoods of Czerniakow, Sadyba, Siekierki, Sielce, Stegny. It also includes low-rise areas with single-family housing, such as in Augustówka, Królikarnia, Sadyba, and Siekierki. Upper Mokotów constitutes the other side of the district.

Lower Mokotów features the St. Anthony of Padua Church, a Roman Catholic parish church dating to 1693, and the Sielce Manor House, a historical a neoclassical two-storey palace built in the 18th century. It also includes Uniwersus, a historical brutalist bookstore pavilion dating to 1980, now an office building, and Agora Headquarters, a postmodernist building, opened in 2002, regarded as one of the best office building designs in the city. Additionally, the area features shopping centres such as Centrum Handlowe Panorama and Sadyba Best Mall. Lower Mokotów features several green areas, including three parks in the neighbourhood of Sielce, named the Arcadia Park, the Eye of the Sea Park, and the Sielce Park. It also includes the Warsaw Uprising Mound, an artificial hill with the height of 121 m above the sea level, or 31 m of relative height, which forms a memorial and an urban park. The area borders the Vistula river to the east, and Warsaw Escarpment in the west. It also includes Czerniaków Lake, the largest lake in Warsaw.

The oldest known signs of human activity area come from around 500 BCE. In the 13th century, the village of Czerniaków was founded near the Vistula river. The next century, Sielce and Szopy were also established. In the 16th century, the village of Siekierki was also founded. In 1867, the area was divided between municipalities of Mokotów to the west and Wilanów to the east. Throughout the 1880s, three forts were built across Lower Mokotów by the Russian Imperial Army as part of the series of fortifications surrounding the city, known as the Warsaw Fortress. They were decommissioned in 1909, and partially demolished in 1913. Majority of the area of Lower Mokotów was incorporated into the city of Warsaw in 1916, with small portion were later added in 1938 and 1951. Between 1924 and 1928, the neighbourhood of Sadyba, consisting of single-family housing, was developed to the south of Czerniaków. Between 1953 and 1967, a series of housing estates were developed in the area of Sielce. They were followed with developments in the neighbourhoods of Czerniaków and Stegny, in the 1970s and 1980s. Another modernist housing estates were developed in the first quoter of the 21st century, including in the areas of Stegny and Siekierki. In 1993, Centrum Handlowe Panorama was opened becoming the first shopping mall in Warsaw. In 2002, the Siekierki Bridge was opened, forming the corssing over the Vistula river.

== Toponomy ==
The name Mokotów most likely comes from the name of its former owner Mokot or Mokoto, which with addition of the suffix -ów, translates to Mokot's place. A hypothesis proposes the person's name originates from a Middle High German word mocke, meaning "clumsy" and "uneducated". Originally used for the village, now in the neighbourhood of Old Mokotów, it became a name of the city district of Mokotów. It is traditionally divided into two areas, Upper Mokotów in the west, and Lower Mokotów in the east, divided by the peaks of the Warsaw Escaprment.

== History ==
=== Prehistory ===
A small flint axe dating to around 500 BCE, was discovered near Idzikowskiego Street in the area of the modern neighbourhood of Czerniaków.

=== Middle Ages ===
In the 13th century, the villages of Czerniaków and Czernów, originally known as Czerniakowo and Czarnowo respectively, were founded near Vistula river. In the 15th century, Czerniaków became the property of Hincza Cedlic, a chamberlain of Warsaw in service of duke Janusz I. In 1412, the village of Sielce was recorded in documents in which duke Janusz I the Old granted its ownership to the St. John Archcathedral in Warsaw. It remained in its possession until it was confiscated by the Prussian government, following the Third Partition of Poland in 1795. Sielce was a small farming community, probably originating as a part of the village of Czerniaków. By 1456, the village of Szopy was also recorded in the area to the west of the Warsaw Escarpment near the road connecting Warsaw with Puławy, now forming Puławska Street.

=== Early modern period ===
In the 16th century, the village of Siekierki, originally known as Kępa Bełt, was first recorded in the documents. In the 17th century, Czerniaków was acquired by Andrzej Górski, the voivode of Mazovia. After his death in 1626, the village was inherited by his descendants, and later by the King of Poland.

Since the first half of the 17th century, the village of Szopy was owned by the Roman Catholic order of Discalced Carmelites. In 1795, as the area became part of the Kingdom of Prussia, the village was nationalised, and in the late 18th century, the government begun placing German settlers in the village, which became known as Szopy Niemieckie (lit. 'German Szopy'). The Polish population settled an area to the east of Warsaw Escarpment, naming their settlement as Szopy Polskie (lit. 'Polish Shopy'). To the north of Szopy Polskie, was also founded Szopy Francuskie (lit. 'French Szopy'), settled by a French population. A few remaining historical buildings of Szopy Polskie survive in the area of Bocheńska and Jaśminowa Streets.

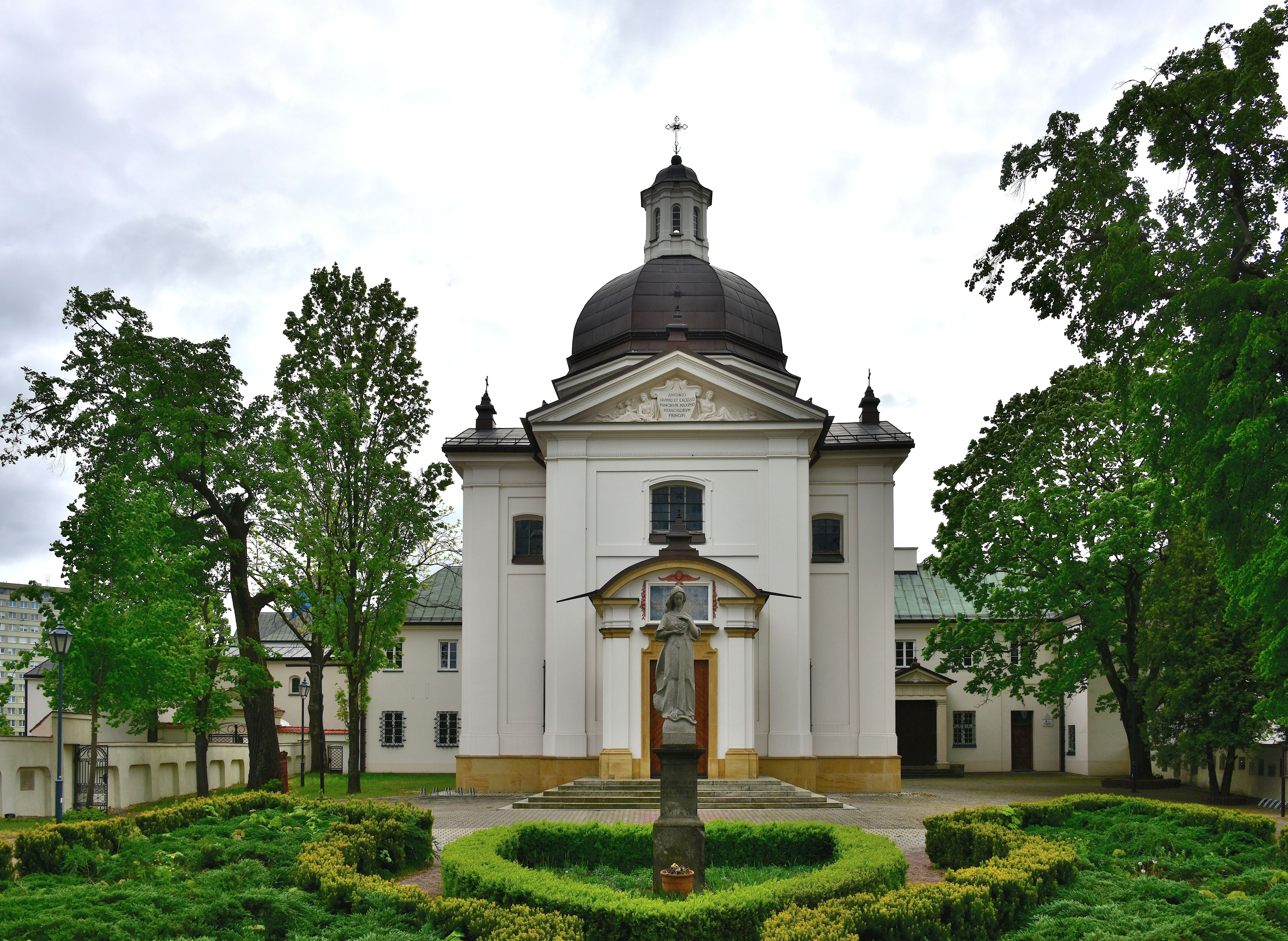
The St. Anthony of Padua Church, built in 1693.

In 1680, nobleperson and politician Stanisław Herakliusz Lubomirski built his palace residence near the current Piaseczyńska Street, with a garden complex. It included the Arcadia and Rabbit House ponds. In 1720, the area was bought by king Augustus III of Poland, monarch of the Polish–Lithuanian Commonwealth, to use its natural water springs, to feed the water features of the Royal Baths park complex. In 1683, Stanisław Herakliusz Lubomirski also acquired Czerniaków and Siekierki, incorporating them into his agricultural landed estate. He also founded the construction of a hospital and the St. Anthony of Padua Church in Czerniaków. The later belonged to the Roman Catholic denomination, and was cojoined with a monastery of Bernardines, both being opened in 1693. The monastery was closed in 1864, and reactivated in 1945. An area near Siekierki was leased in the 18th century as a hunting ground to king Augustus II the Strong.

From 31 July to 19 August 1732, the exercises and exhibition of the military of the Polish–Lithuanian Commonwealth was held at the field of Czerniaków.

In 1770, the fortification lines known as the Lubomirski Ramparts, was developed around Warsaw, crossing land to the north of Mokotów. By the beginning of the 18th century, a set of tollhouses was established at the entrance alongside Belwederska Street (then Belweder Road), known as the Belweder Tollhouses. Between 1818 and 1823, they were replaced with two new neoclassical pavilions.

In 1774, the Szuster Palace, together with a garden complex, were built to the northwest of Sielce, as a residence of princess Elżbieta Izabela Lubomirska. In 1820, the estate became property of nobleperson Anna Tyszkiewicz, and in 1845, it was bought by Franciszek Szuster, who then opened a popular holiday village in the area, named the Promenade (Polish: Promenada), with the gardens becoming its recreational green area. The park also included the Promenade Ponds, two artificial lakes formed from flooded clay pits. At the end of the 19th century, the Promenade amusement park was opened, with a luxury restaurant, circus, and open-air theatre among other attractions. It operated until the outbreak of the First World War, and again from its end until the beginning of the Second World War.

In 1775, the village of Sielce was leased to king Stanisław August Poniatowski, who founded there an English landscape garden centred around the Sielce Lake. In the second half of the 18th century the Sielce Manor House, a neoclassical two-storey palace, was built in the garden. Around 1860, a silkworm farm was established in the area.

=== 19th century ===
At the beginning of the 19th century, the village of Potok was founded alongside a road now forming Potoki Street, near the Warsaw Escarpment to the south of Szopy Polskie. By the 19th century, the village of Augustówka was also present in the area near the Vistula river, while the village of Siekierki was divided into two settlements, Siekierki Wielkie and Siekierki Małe (Polish for Greater Siekierki and Lesser Siekierki).

In 1865, the Czerniaków Harbour was opened on an oxbow lake of Vistula river, and until 1965, it housed a shipyard.

In 1866, a portion of the lands of Sielce, which belonged to the estate of the Duchy of Łowicz, was partitioned and sold, leading to the formations of four new hamlets founded alongside Wilanów Road (now Jana III Sobieskiego Street). They were Jadzin, Marcelin, Stoczek, and Przylipie. In the second half of the 19th century, a portion of Sielce belonged to Konstantin Pavlovich, the commander-in-chief of the Army of Congress Poland, and a member of the House of Romanov. Following his and his wife's deaths in 1831, the possession was left in their last will to his brother, Nicholas I, the Emperor of Russia and King of Poland. As such, it became a property of the Russian government, and remained in its possession until the independence of Poland in 1918.

On 13 January 1867, the area of Lower Mokotów was divided between municipalities of Mokotów to the west and Wilanów to the east, which were established as part of the administrative reform in the Kingdom of Poland. The municipality of Mokotów included the villages of Czerniaków, Siekierki Małe, Siekierki Wielkie, Sielce, Szopy Niemieckie, and Szopy Polskie, while the municipality of Wilanów included Augustówka. In 1909, villages of Czerniaków, Szopy Polskie, Szopy Niemieckie, Siekierki Małe, and Siekierki Wielkie were transferred to the municipality of Wilanów.

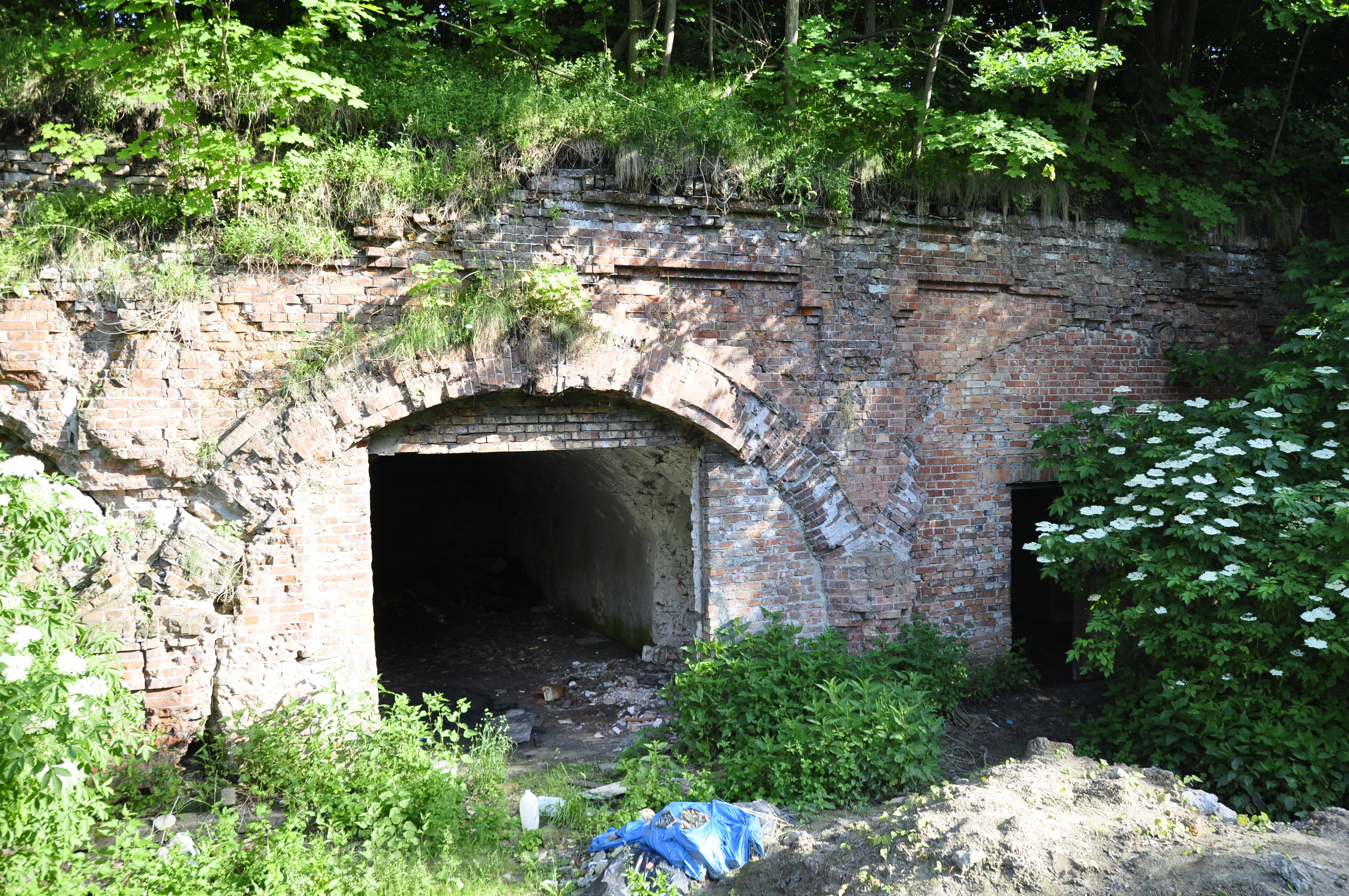
The ruins of the Fort Che, built in the 1880s.

Throughout the 1880s, three forts were built across Lower Mokotów by the Russian Imperial Army as part of the series of fortifications surrounding the city, known as the Warsaw Fortress. This included the Fort IX to the south of Czerniaków, the Fort X to the north of Augustówka, and the Fort Che to the east of Szopy. They were decommissioned in 1909, and the first two were partially demolished in 1913.

On 16 May 1891, a line of the narrow-gauge railroad operated by the Wilanów Railway, connecting the area with Old Mokotów and Warsaw, with station in Marcelin, and ending at Berdandine Square in Czerniaków. It was originally operated with the horsecars, which were with steam locomotives in 1894. In 1914, the tracks briefly crossed Sielce, being closed and rerouted shortly after, due to low demand and protests from the local residents. In 1921, Sielce was connected to the municipal transit system via a bus line, which was replaced with a tram line on Czerniakowska Street a year later. The line ended at the Bernardine Square in Czerniaków. In 1935, it was extended to the south, alongside Powsińska Street, connecting the line to Wilanów. The line was closed down in 1957.

=== Early 20th century ===
In 1907, the Czerniaków Cemetery was founded at 44 and 46 Powsińska Street, belonging to the Roman Catholic denomination.

On 8 April 1916, the majority of the villages of Lower Mokotów were incorporated into the city of Warsaw. Potok was incorporated into the city on 27 September 1938, while Augustówka was incorporated on 15 May 1951.

In 1919, a series of single-family houses were constructed alongside Gorczerwska Street, stretching between Czerniaków Lake and Posińska Street. In the early 1920s, in the area of Czerniaków Lake was also developed a neighbourhood of villas, known as the Garden City of Czerniaków (Polish: Miasto-Ogród Czerniaków). It was designed following the principles of the garden city movement, and later the houses inspired by the 18th- and 19th-century Polish manor houses were developed in the area. Between 1924 and 1928, the neighbourhood of Sadyba was developed around the Fort IX, and with its outer boundary marked by Okrężna Street. It consisted of detached and semi-detached single-family houses. It was developed by the Sadyba Officer Construction and Housing Association (Polish: Oficerska Spółdzielnia Budowlano-Mieszkaniową „Sadyba”), founded in 1923 by officers of the General Staff of the Polish Armed Forces, with major Władysław Kuntz and general Józef Zając at its helm. First residents moved in 1926, which included families of 28 organisation founders, and numerous officers of the Polish Armed Forces, including veterans of the First World War and the Polish–Soviet War. In 1933, the Association of the Friends of Garden City of Czerniaków was founded, being granted the ownership of the Fort IX by the city. In 1936, the remains of the fortifications on the eastern side of Powsińska Street were demolished, with the area being developed into a park, later named Szczubełek Park in 1993. During the interwar period, the area around Belwederska Street in Sielce also began to develop into a modern suburb. In 2013, a small garden square at the corner of Powsińska and Okrężna Street near the fort was also named the Armenian Square, to celebrate Armenian minority in Poland. A khachkar, a traditional Armenian memorial stone sculpture bearing a cross, was placed at in the garden. Eighteen oak trees were also planted there, being dedicated in memorial to officers of the Polish Armed Forces from Sadyba, which were murdered in the Katyn massacre.

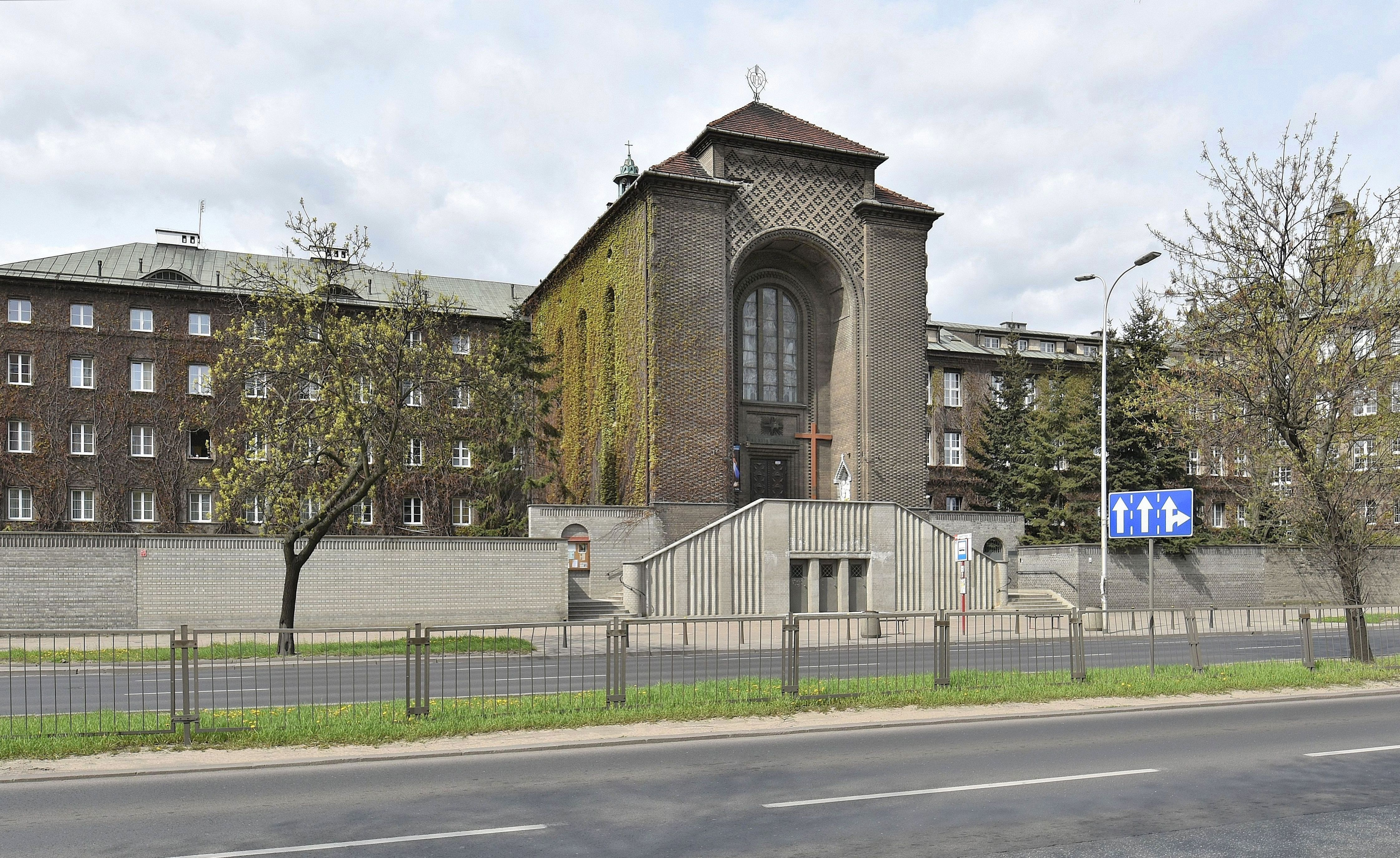
The St. Joseph the Betrothed Church, built in 1926.

During the interwar period, two Roman Catholic churches were developed in Sielce. They were the St. Joseph the Betrothed Church built at 137 Czerniakowska Street in 1926, and the St. Casimir Church built at 21A Chełmska Street in 1934.

In 1926, a levee along the left bank of the Vistula was completed, mitigating the previously threatening flood hazard and facilitating further development. In the 1930s, artificial water canals were built to irrigate farmlands in Czerniaków and Siekierki by diverting the water to the Vistula river. Prior to 1939, Czerniaków was an impoverished area. At the time, the neighbourhood, together with Powiśle was referred locally as the "Lowland" (Polish: Dół), due to its lower elevation when compared to the Downtown.

During the interwar period the Fort Che housed an ammunition factory. In the 1930s, the surrounding area was parceled and sold for the construction of single-family housing, expanding the nearby neighbourhood of Królikarnia.

=== Second World War ===
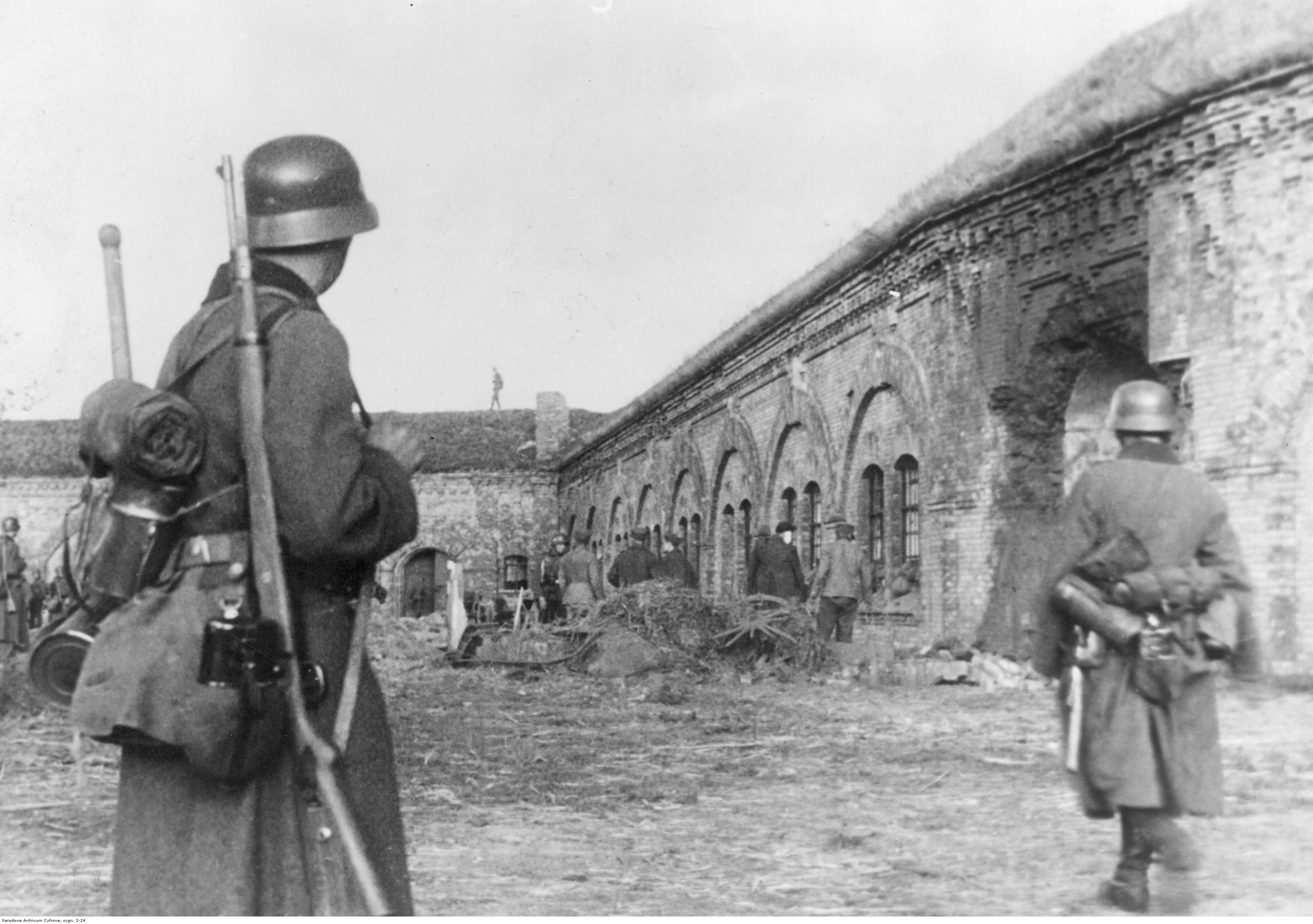
The Fort IX, one of the city fortifications, dating to 1887. Photography made in 1944, while it was occupied by the German Army during the Second World War.

In September 1939, during the siege of Warsaw in the Second World War, the fortifications in the area were used as defensive position by the Polish Land Forces. The Fort Che was captured by the German Army on 25 September 1939, while the Fort IX, defended by the 2nd Battalion of the 360th Infantry Regiment and other volunteers, was captured the next day, following heavy fighting.

During the Warsaw Uprising, the Fort IX was abandoned by German soldiers on 7 August 1944, and from 19 August, the fort, together with the nearby neighbourhoods of Sadyba and the Garden City of Czerniaków, were occupied by the soldiers of the Oaza Battalion of the Home Army, which moved to the area from the Chojnów Woods. The German forces, led by major general Günther Rohr begun attacking the area on 29 August 1944. Sadyba was also heavily bombarded by the German Air Force. On 1 September, the fort was attacked by German forces greatly outnumbering Polish defenders. On that day, a bomb was dropped from a plane onto the fort, killing leader of Oaza Battalion, Czesław Szczubełek, and 24 others members. The neighbourhood was captured the next day. Around 200 Polish soldiers died in fighting, with only a few managing to retreat. Afterwards, the German officers executed Polish prisoners-of-war captured in Sadyba, and conducted series of executions of civilians in the area, including men, women, and children. This included the killing of around 80 residents of houses on Podhalańska, Klarysewska, Chochołowska Streets. The German officers also conducted mass executions on residents of Siekierki, and burned down most of its buildings. The Fort Che was also used as defensive position by the Home Army soldiers, being captured by the Germany Armed Forces on 15 September 1944.

Between 17 and 19 September 1944, units of the First Polish Army conducted the reconnaissance and diversion activities in the area of Siekierki, crossing from the other side of the Vistula river. In 1944, the ruins of Fort X in Augustówka were used by the German soldiers during the defense from the Red Army of the Soviet Union. After the war, the area was used as a military shooting range.

=== Communist period ===
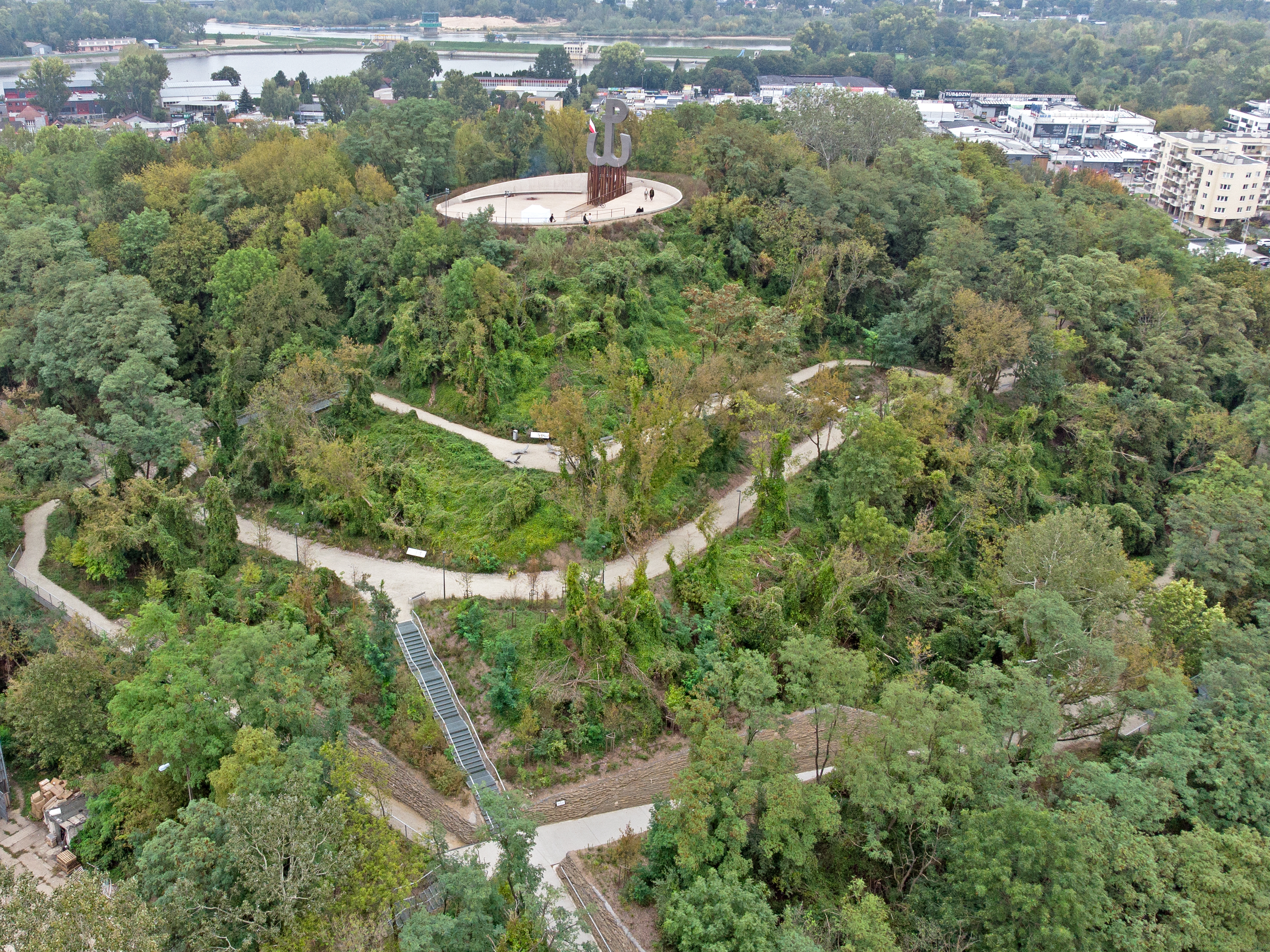
The Warsaw Uprising Mound, formed between the 1945 and the 1960s.

Between 1943 and 1949, local girl Władysława Papis claimed to have experienced a private revelation in Siekierki, in form of repeated apparitions of Virgin Mary, Jesus Christ, and other Christian religious symbols, giving rise to a local Marian worship. In 1946, a small chapel was built at 3 Gwintowa Street, in place of the supposed revelation. In 1994, the Sanctuary of Our Lady the Teacher of the Yough was opened next to it, managed by the Piarist order.

In 1945, the Warsaw Uprising Mound began being formed next to Bartycka Street. It was an artificial hill made from the rubble of buildings from across the city, which were destroyed during the Second World War. It continued to be used as a landfill until the 1960s. In 2004, it was cleaned up, and turned into a scenic viewpoint. A sculpture was placed on its top, depicting the Anchor, the symbol of the Polish Underground State during the Second World War, meant to commemorate the Warsaw Uprising. An urban park, named the Operation Tempest Park, was developed in the area around the mound.

In 1949, Wytwórnia Filmów Dokumentalnych i Fabularnych (lit. 'Narrative and Documentary Film Studio'), one of the oldest continuously operated film studios in Poland, was founded at 21 Chełmska Street.

In 1951, Warsaw was divided into 11 city districts. Majority of Lower Mokotów became part of the district of Wilanów, while its eastern portion, including Sielce, Szopy Polskie, and Potok, were incorporated into the district of Mokotów. On 1 January 1960, both district were combined, forming new district of Mokotów. On 2 April 1990, the district was transformed into the municipality of Warsaw-Mokotów. On 19 June 1994, it was disestablished, with its northern portion being incorporated into the municipality of Warsaw-Centre, becoming its subdivision as the Mokotów district. The municipality was disestablished on 27 October 2002, with Mokotów becoming again a city district of Warsaw.

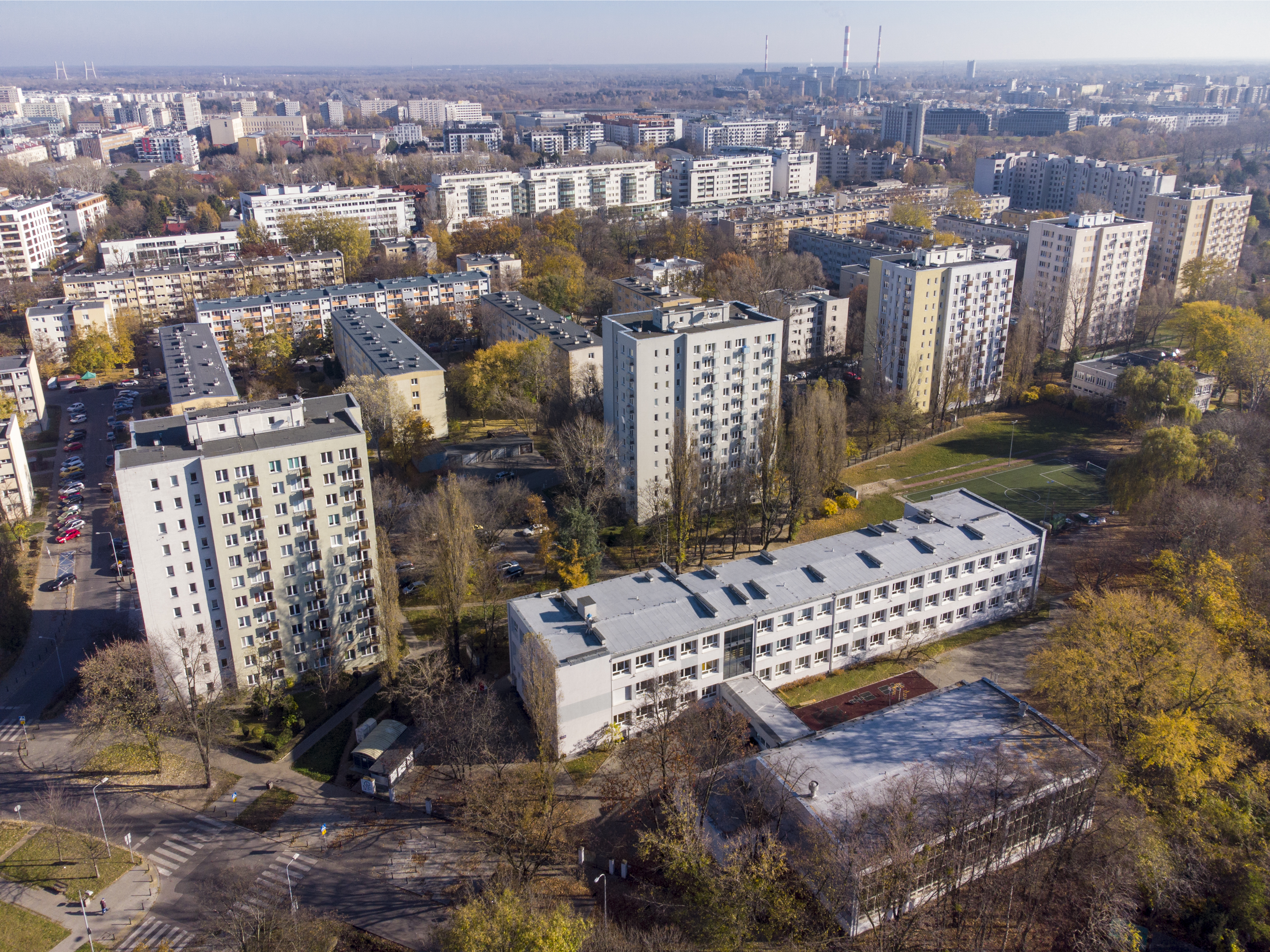
The apartment buildings of the housing estate of Dolna Sobieskiego, developed in Sielce between 1953 and 1967.

Between 1953 and 1967, a series of housing estates were developed in the area of Sielce. They were centred around Chełmska, Gagarina, and Sobieskiego Streets, and featured apartment buildings constructed with the large panel system technology. This included neighbourhoods of Chełmska, Dolna-Belwederska, Dolna-Piaseczyńska, Dolna-Sobieskiego, and Sielce, among others. Beginning in 1969, throughout the 1970s, another series of housing estates of high-rise apartment buildings were developed between Świętego Bonifacego, Powsińska, Idzikowskiego, and Jana III Sobieskiego Streets. They were also constructed with the large panel system technology. The undeveloped area in its centre, located between Limanowskiego, Konstancińska, Jaszowiecka, and Spalska Streets became a recreational area, later named the Dygat Park in 2009.

In 1956, the Czerniaków Hospital was opened at 19 and 25 Stępińska Street.

In 1959, a small ski jumping venue was opened at 3 Czerniowiecka Street. It was operated by the Warsaw Ski Club, and had the construction point at 38 m (124.67 ft). It was mostly used as a training venue and occasionally hosted ski jumping competitions. It was modernised between 1975 and 1980. The last competition was hosted there in 1989, with it continuing to serve as a training venue until the early 1990s, after which it stopped being used. It was deconstructed between 2010 and 2011.

In 1960, the Chełmska bus depot was opened at the corner of Chełmska and Czerniakowska Streets. As the only one of the city, it stored the trolleybuses, until they were phased out in 1973. The depot operated until 2006 when it was demolished.

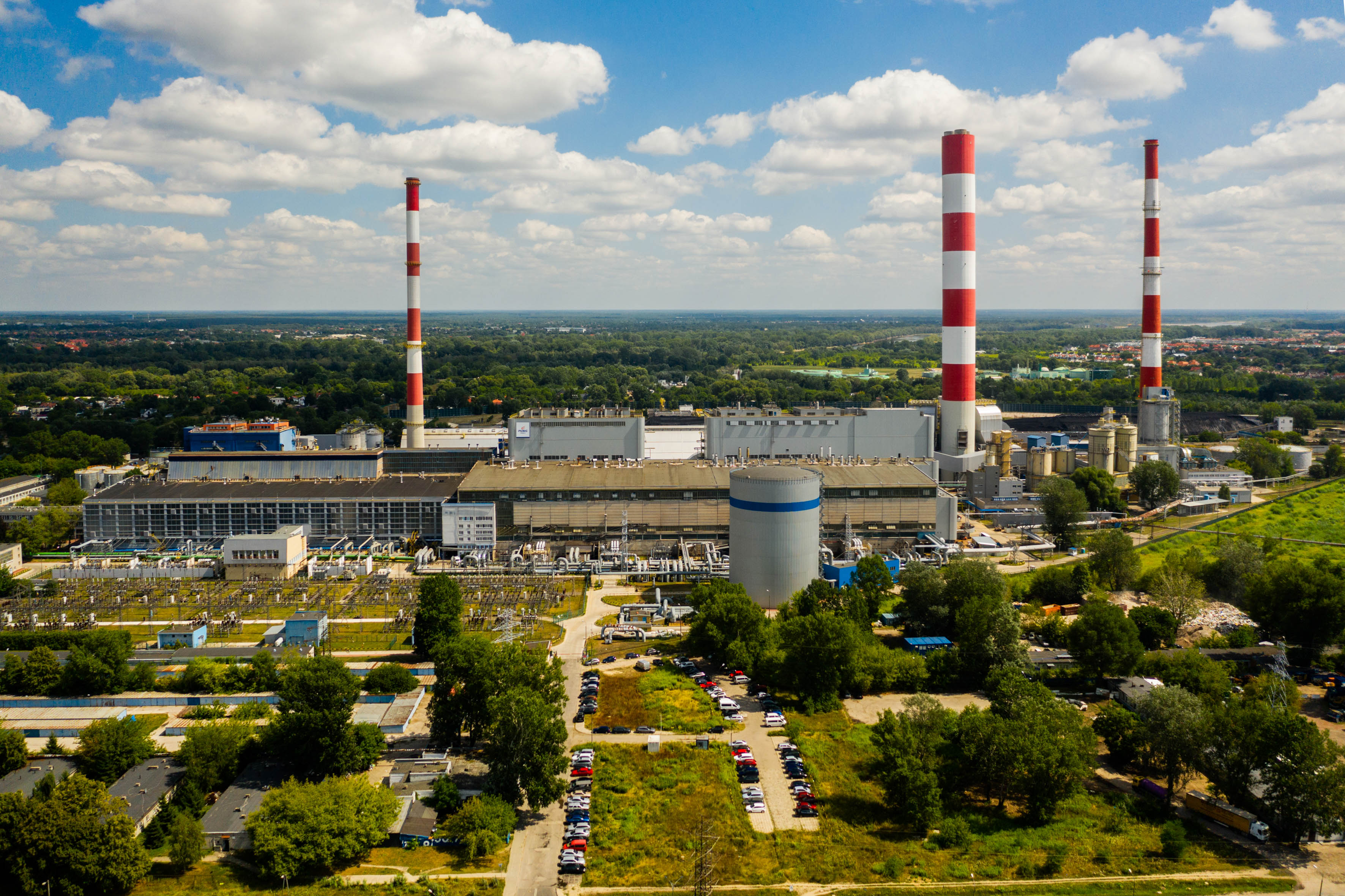
The Siekierki Cogeneration Plant, built in 1961.

In 1961 the Siekierki Cogeneration Plant, the largest combined heat and power plant in Poland, was built in the vicinity if the neighbourhood. The government planned to develop a science park in Augustówka and Siekierki by constructing a complex of research facilities along with corresponding housing developments. However, the increasing economic crisis halted the project, with the Space Research Centre of Polish Academy of Sciences, completed in 1978, being its only facility.

In 1969, the new headquarters of the Institute of Food and Nutrition was opened at 61 and 63 Powsińska Street.

Throughout the 1960s and 1970s, the historic gardens in Sielce were redeveloped into the Arcadia Park, the Sielce Park, and the Eye of the Sea Park.

Between 1970 and 1980, two housing estates of high-rise apartment buildings were developed in Czerniaków. They were Bernardyńska around Gołkowska Street, and Czerniakowska Wschodnia around Czerniakowska Street.

Between 1971 and 1977, the housing estate of Stegny was developed in the area of 75 ha. It consisted of apartment buildings, constated with the large panel system technology. The buildings were made from prefabricated components, manufactured in the Służewiec House Factory (Polish: Fabryka Domów „Służewiec”). The neighbourhood was designed by Jadwiga Grębecka, Jan Szpakowicz, and Romuald Welder, with the project receiving the Minister of Constitution Award. In January 1975, the one-millionth public housing unit in the Polish People's Republic, and simultaneously the 150-thousandth unit in Warsaw, was assigned in the building at 3 Marylska Street. The event was commemorated with a plaque installed on the building's façade.

In 1973, the Institute of Psychiatry and Neurology was opened at 5 Sobieskiego Street.

In 1974, Czerniakowska and Powsińka Streets became part of Vistula Way, a thoroughfare crossing the city on the north–south axis. To facilitate the change, the tram tracks were removed from Czerniakowska Street, Gagarina Street, Spacerowa Street, Powsińska Street in 1973.

In 1979, the Stegny speed skating rink was opened at 1 Inspektowa Street, featuring a track with dimensions of 400 m × 11 m. Prior to this, a natural ice rink operated at the location.

In 1980, the brutalist bookstore pavilion, known as Uniwersus, was built at 20 and 22 Belwederska Street, and acclaimed for its design. In the 1990s, it was turned into an office building.

Between 1981 and 1985, the St. Thaddeus the Apostle Church, which belongs to the Roman Catholic denomination, was built at 16 Goraszewska Street.

=== Democratic period ===
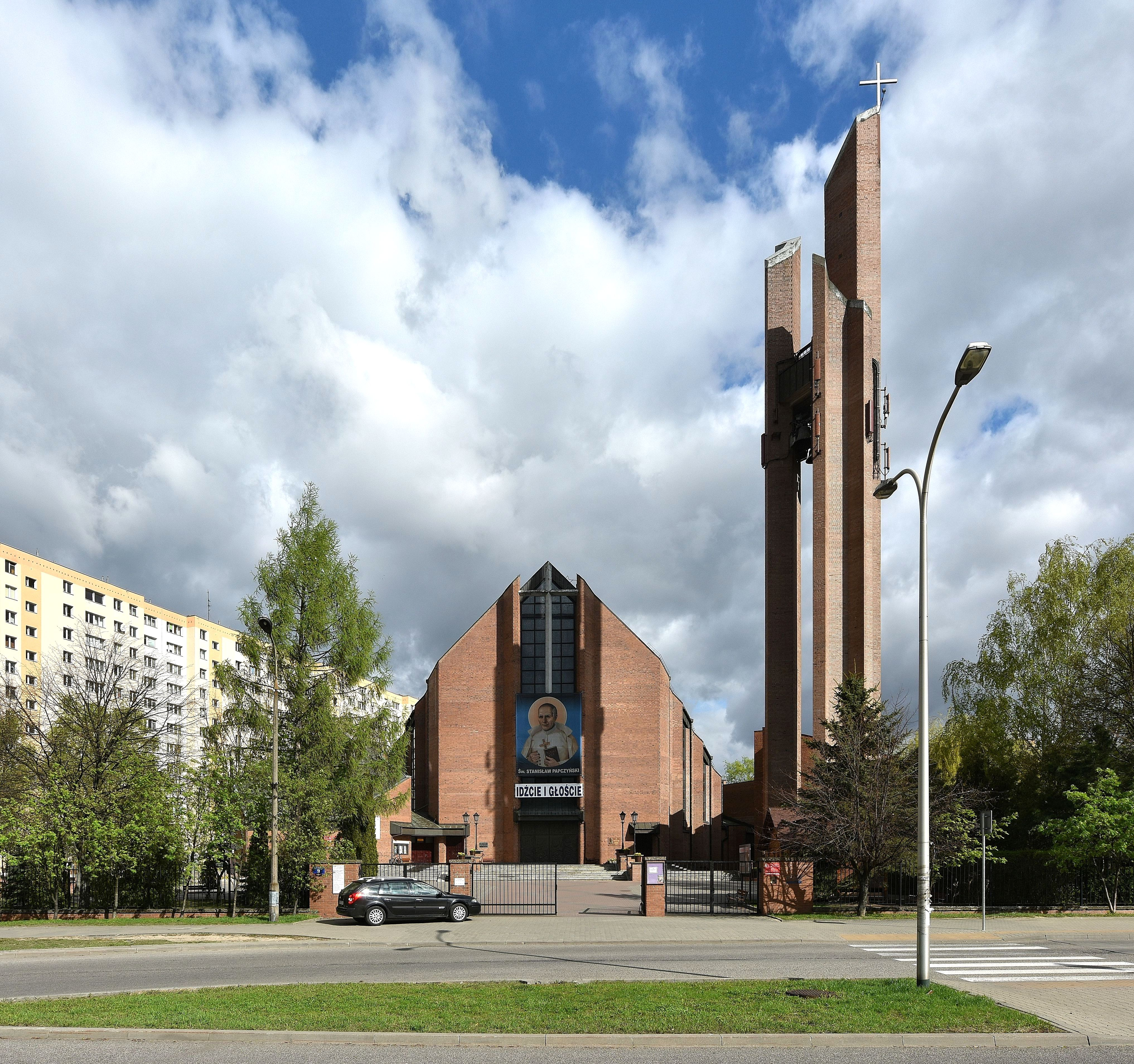
The Church of the Most Holy Virgin Mary the Mother of Divine Mercy, built in 2003.

Between 1980 and 1993, the housing estate of Wilanówek was developed in area between Wilanowska Avenue, Jana III Sobieskiego Street, and Śródziemnomorska Street. It consisted of terraced houses and apartment buildings.

Between 1981 and 1993, the Church of the Most Holy Virgin Mary the Mother of Divine Mercy was built at 9 Świętego Bonifacego Street, and between 1999 and 2003, the St. Anthony Maria Zaccaria Church was built at 15 Sobieskiego Street. Both belong to the Roman Catholic denomination and are located in Stegny. Between 1986 and 1992, the housing estate of Arbuzowa, consisting of apartment buildings constructed with the large panel system technology. It was designed by Jolanta Lipińska and Marek Mirski. The neighbourhood is located between Wilanowska Avenue, Patkowskiego Street, and Służewiec Stream.

In 1991, the Tadeusz Koźluk Medical Academy of Warsaw, the first private university in the city, was founded at 9 Bobrowiecka Street.

In 1993, the Museum of Polish Military Technology and the Katyń Museum were opened in the Fort IX. The latter was moved to the Warsaw Citadel in 2009.

In 1993, Centrum Handlowe Panorama was opened at 31 Witosa Street, becoming the first shopping mall in the city. In 2000, Sadyba Best Mall was also opened at 31 Powsińska Street.

On 4 October 1996, the Mokotów district was subdivided into twelve City Information System areas, with Lower Mokotów forming its western side including the areas of Augustówka, Czerniaków, Sadyba, Siekierki, and Sielce. On 4 December 1997, the administrative neighbourhood of Sadyba was established, as a subdivision of the Mokotów district, governed by an elected council. It was followed with the establishments of the administrative neighbourhoods of Siekierki on 26 January 2016, and Augustówka on 9 December 2025.

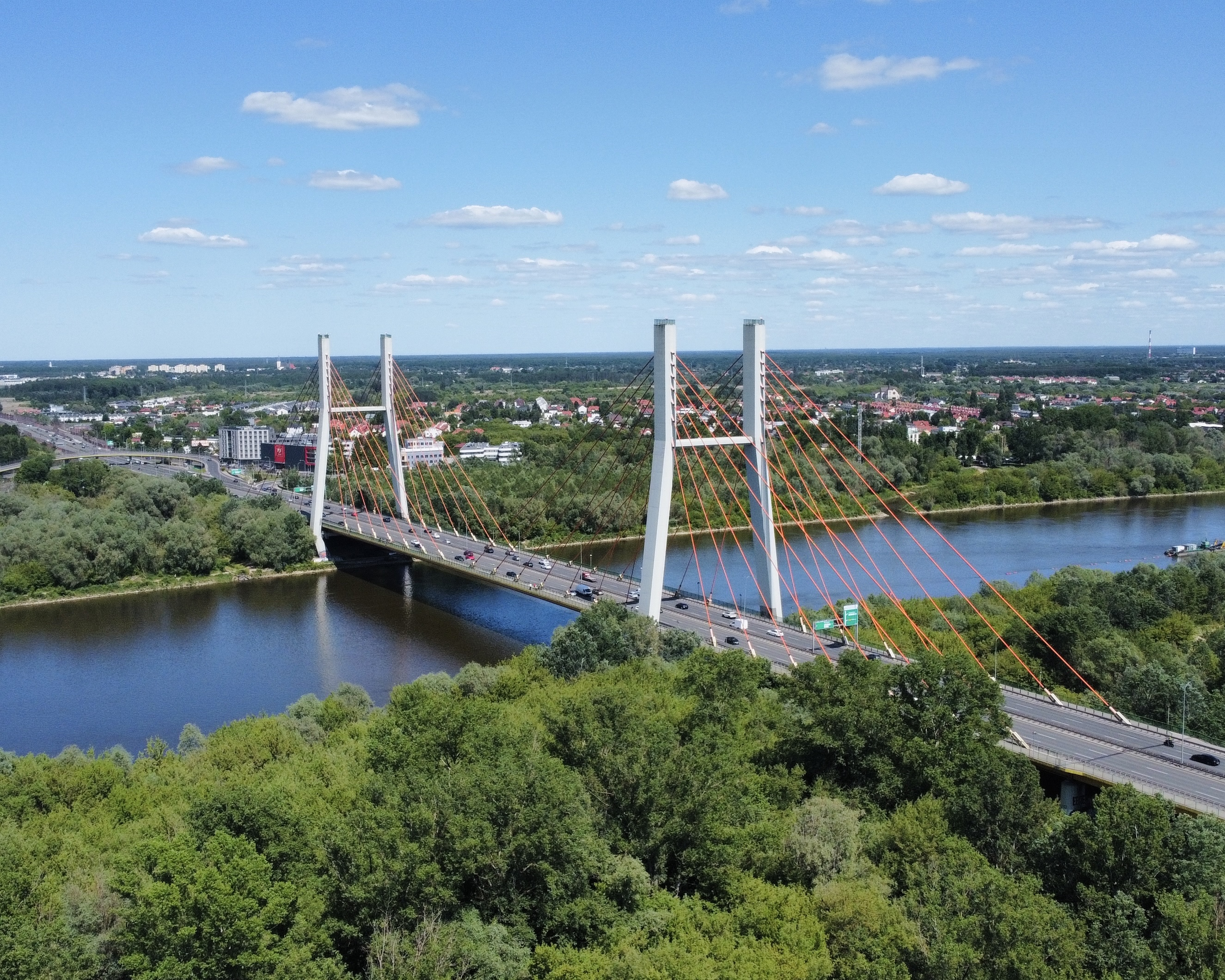
The Siekierki Bridge, opened in 2002.

In 2002, the Siekieri Route, a thoroughfare connecting the west and east banks of the Vistula river, was opened crossing neighbourhood, including Bem Avenue, and the Siekierki Bridge on the Vistula river. In 2004, the land adjacent to the river was designated as a conservation area under the Natura 2000 program.

In 2002, the Agora Headquarters, a postmodernist office building was opened at 8 and 10 Czerska Street. It was acclaimed for its design, and is regarded as one of the best office building designs in the city. The same year, the Wajda School, a private film university, was founded at 21 Chełmska Street, by filmmakers Andrzej Wajda, Wojciech Marczewski, and Barbara Pec-Ślesicka.

In 2003, the Beit Warszawa Synagogue, which belongs to the Reform Jewish denomination, was founded in a house at 9 Stępińska Street.

Between 2006 and 2014, the housing estate of Osiedle Ażurowych Okiennic (lit. 'Openwork Shutters Estate') was constructed between Przy Grobli Street, Patkowskiego Street, and Wilanowska Avenue, consisting of 13 apartment buildings, varying in height between 4 and 7 storeys, and characterized by their wooden window blinds installed on their façades. In the early 2010s, the housing estates of apartment buildings began developing in Siekierki. In 2019, the arterial road known as Polski Walczącej Avenue was opened in the neighbourhood, connecting Siekierki Route and Czerniakowska Street. Between 2017 and 2018, the area of Fort Che was redeveloped as an apartment hotel, a series of with neomodernist residential buildings being developed in the complex. The historical fort barracks were also restored as a shopping centre with restaurants and cultural institutions. Beginning in 2016, and continuing throughout the 2010s and 2020s, the housing estate of Nova Królikarnia is being developed to the east of Sikorskiego Avenue, and to the north of Wilanowska Avenue. Designed following the principles of the garden city movement, it consists of a series of the modernist apartment buildings.

In 2024, tram line tracks were opened alongside Belwederska Street, Jana III Sobiesdkiego Street, Spacerowa Street, and Gagarina Street. In 2025, they were also built alongside Świętego Bonifacego Street, ending with a turning loop.

== Housing and economy ==
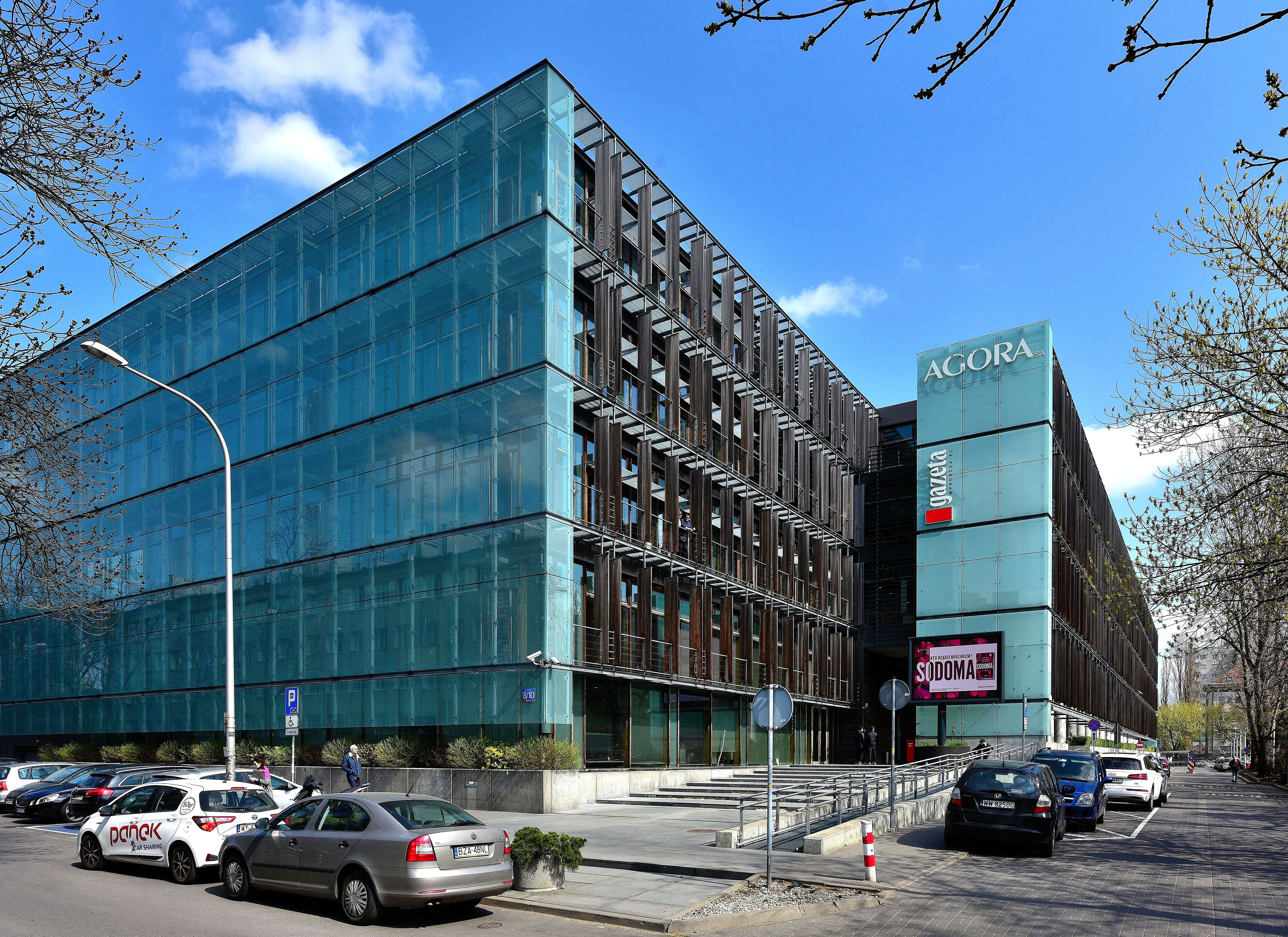
The Agora Headquarters, a postmodernist building, regarded as one of the best office building designs in Warsaw.

Lower Mokotów is dominated by high-rise housing with apartment buildings. It includes the neighbourhoods of Czerniakow, Sadyba, Siekierki, Sielce, Stegny. It also includes low-rise areas with single-family housing, such as Augustówka, Królikarnia, Sadyba, and Siekierki.

The area also features office buildings, including a postmodernist building, at 8 and 10 Czerska Street, regarded as one of the best office building designs in the city. The area also features office buildings, including a postmodernist building, at 8 and 10 Czerska Street, regarded as one of the best office building designs in the city. It also includes Uniwersus, a historical brutalist bookstore pavilion dating to 1980, now an office building, at 20 and 22 Belwederska Street, and Agora Headquarters, a postmodernist building, at 8 and 10 Czerska Street, regarded as one of the best office building designs in the city. Additionally, Lower Mokotów features shopping centres such as Centrum Handlowe Panorama at 31 Witosa Street, and Sadyba Best Mall at 31 Powsińska Street. The former is the oldest shopping mall in Warsaw, being founded in 1993, while the latter is also considered being one of the oldest, dating to 2000. It also includes the a shopping centre houses in the barracks of the Fort Che, a historic demilitarised fortification comples, dating to the 1890s. It is surrounded by a complex of neomodernist residential buildings, operated as an apartment hotel.

Lower Mokotów also houses the Siekierki Cogeneration Plant, the largest combined heat and power plant in Poland, located at 30 Augustówka Street.

== Science and higher education ==
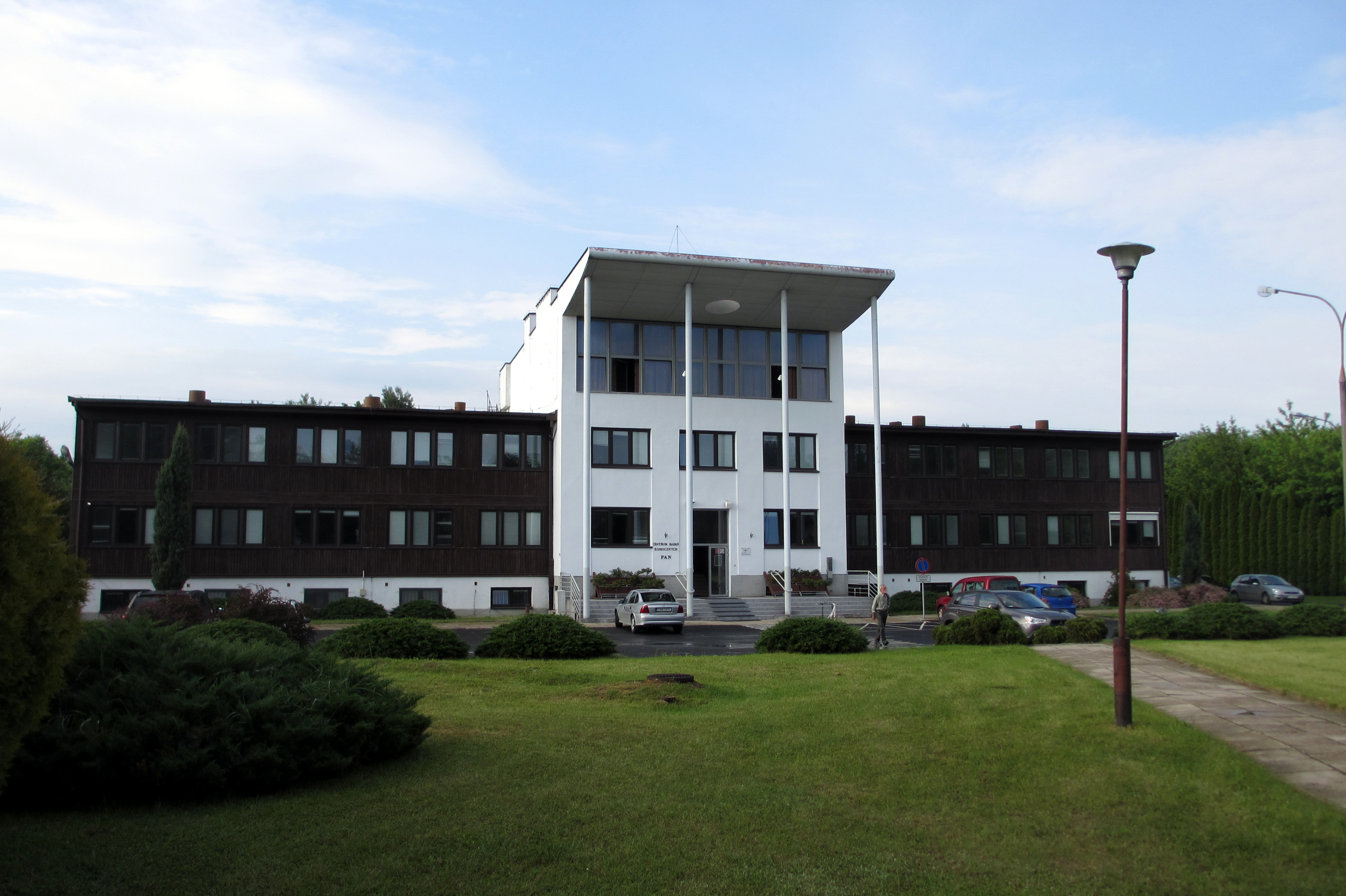
The Space Research Centre of Polish Academy of Sciences.

Lower Mokotów features the headquarters of three state-owned research organisations, the Institute of Food and Nutrition, Institute of Psychiatry and Neurology, and the Space Research Centre of Polish Academy of Sciences. The Siekierki Cogeneration Plant, the largest combined heat and power plant in Poland, also houses one of the facilities of the Institute of Energy, the state-owned research organisation of energy transfer. The area also includes two private universities, the Tadeusz Koźluk Medical Academy of Warsaw at 9 Bobrowiecka Street, and the Wajda School, at 21 Chełmska Street. Additionally, the Czerniaków Hospital is located at 19 and 25 Stępińska Street.

== Culture ==
Lower Mokotów features the St. Anthony of Padua Church, a Roman Catholic parish church dating to 1693, together with a monastery of Bernardines, which is placed at 2 and 4 Czerniakowska Street in Czerniaków. It also includes the Sielce Manor House, a historical a neoclassical two-storey palace built in the 18th century, located in Sielce Park. The area also features two historical fortification complexes, which were built as part of the Warsaw Fortress in the 1890s, and later partially demolished in 1913. They are Fort Che and Fort IX, located on Powsińska and Idzikowskiego Street, with the former housing the Museum of Polish Military Technology. The area also includes the ruins of the Fort X near Wał Zawastowski Street. Lower Mokotów also includes Wytwórnia Filmów Dokumentalnych i Fabularnych (lit. 'Narrative and Documentary Film Studio'), one of the oldest continuously operated film studios in Poland, dating to 1949, and headquartered at 21 Chełmska Street in Sielce.

== Parks and recreation ==
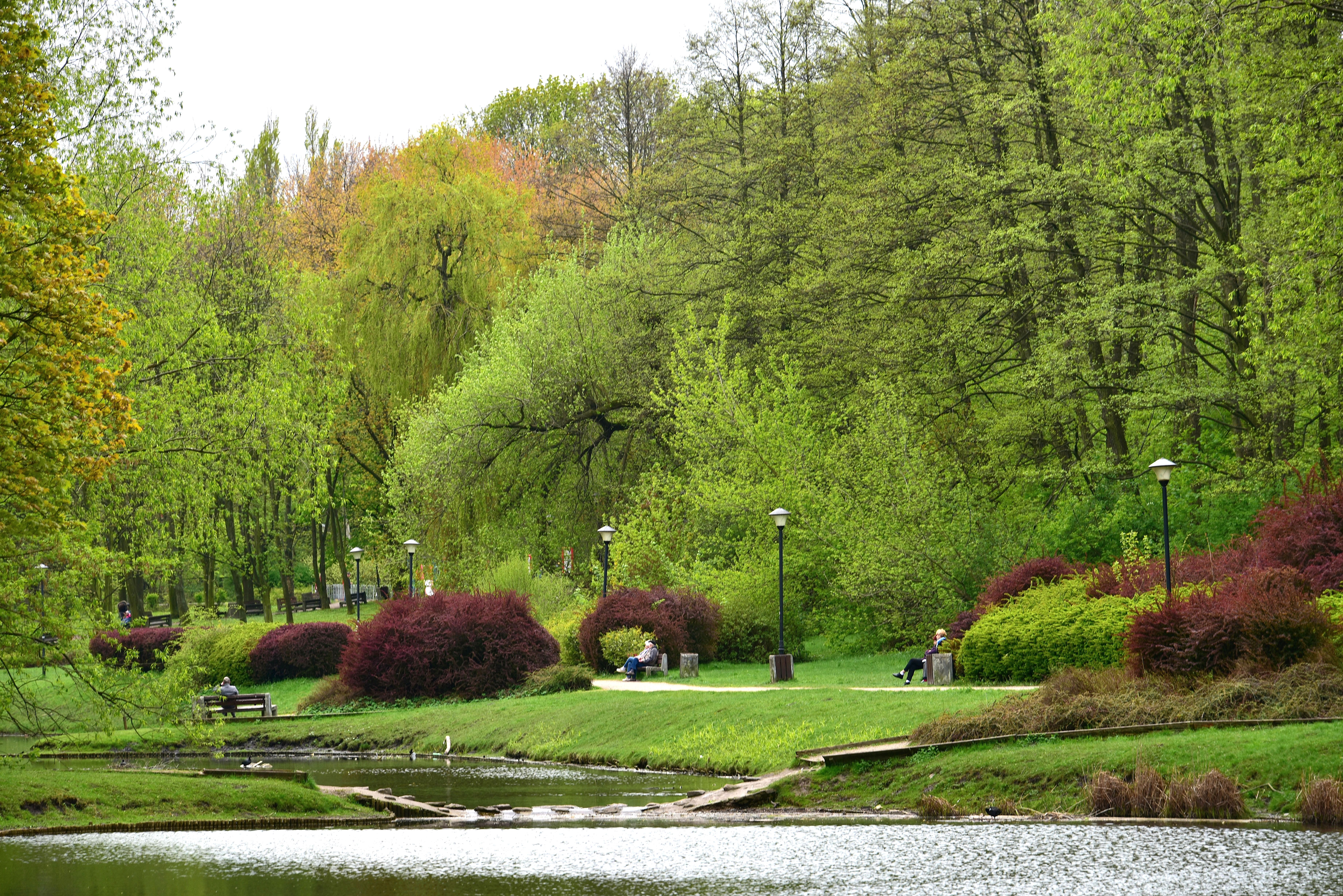
The Arcadia Park.

Lower Mokotów features several green areas, including three parks in the neighbourhood of Sielce, named the Arcadia Park, the Eye of the Sea Park, and the Sielce Park. It also has two parks around the Fort IX, a 19th-century decommissioned fortification. They are the Szczubełek Park to the east, and the Armenian Square to the north. The latter includes the 18 oak trees, dedicated in memorial to officers of the Polish Armed Forces from Sadyba, that were murdered in the Katyn massacre. Additionally, further to the north, the neighbourhood also includes the Dygat Park placed between Limanowskiego, Konstancińska, Jaszowiecka, and Spalska Streets, being surrounded by the apartment buildings of the housing estate of Sadyba.

The Warsaw Uprising Mound, an artificial hill with the height of 121 m above the sea level, or 31 m of relative height, is also located near Bartycka Street in Czerniaków. It is a scenic viewpoint, featuring a sculpture at its top, which depicts the Anchor, the symbol of the Polish Underground State during the Second World War, commemorating the Warsaw Uprising. The mound is surrounded by an urban park, named the Operation Tempest Park.

The area also features the Stegny speed skating rink, with track dimensions of 400 m × 11 m, located at 1 Inspektowa Street.

== Nature ==
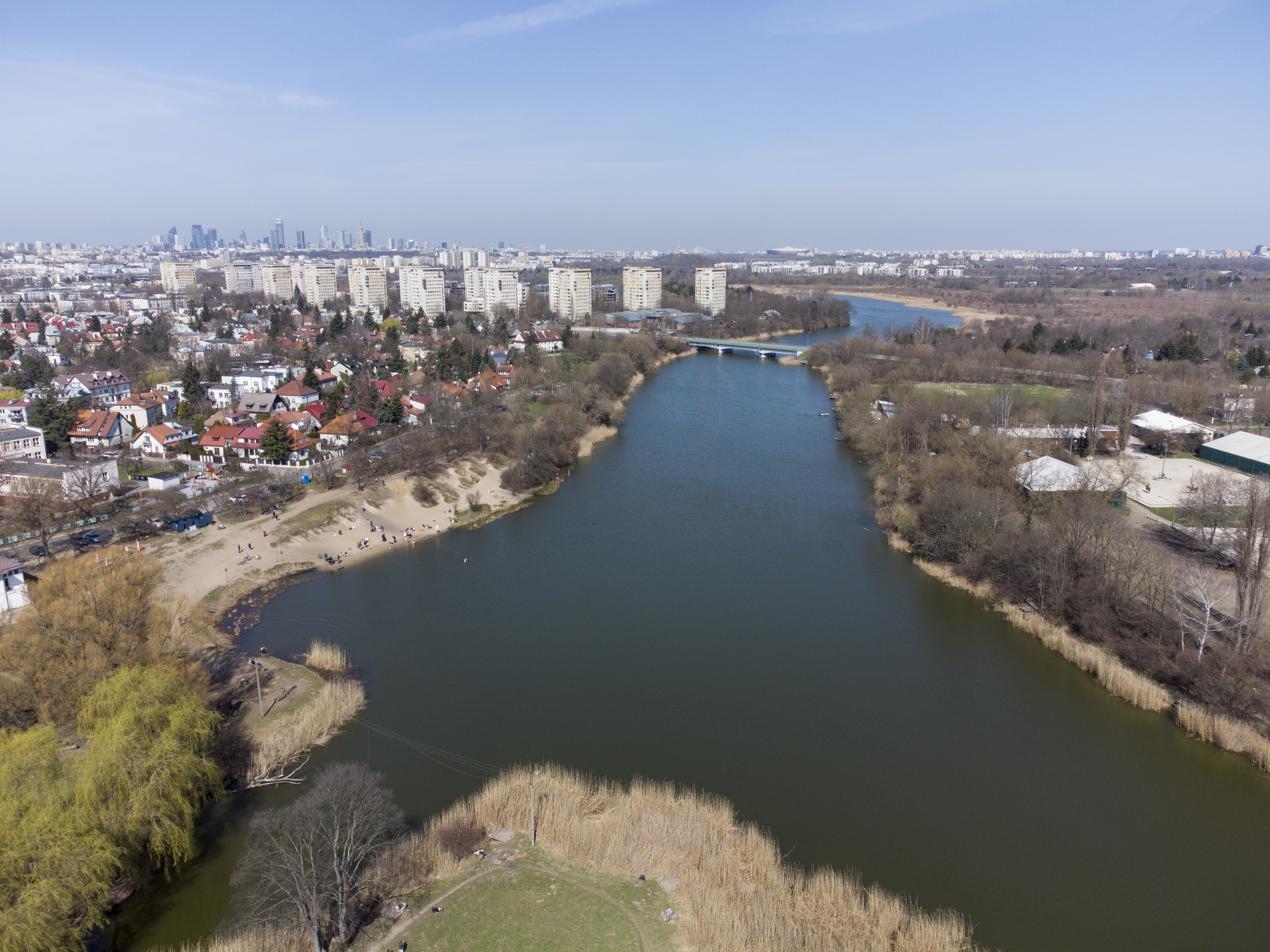
Czerniaków Lake, the largest lake in Warsaw.

The eastern boundary of the Lower Mokotów is marked by the Vistula river, with the land adjacent to its coast being designated as a conservation area under the Natura 2000 program. A portion of its southeastern boundary is also marked by the Wilanówka river, which outflows into the Vistula in the area of the neighbourhood of Augustówka. To the east, the area also features the Czerniaków Lake, which, with an area of 19.5 ha, it is the largest fresh water lake in Warsaw. It is also a bathing lake with a beach, the only in the city with such legal status. The lake is also the outflow destination of two man-made water canals, the Siekierki Canal in the north, and Canal W in the south. To the north, is also located the Siekierki Lake, an oxbow lake branched off from the Vistula river. The surroundings of both lakes have statuses of conservation areas. The Wolica Moat, which was which was also created in the 1890s as part of the city fortifications, is also located to the northeast of Siekierki Lake.

In the west, Lower Mokotów also features several smaller ponds, including Arcadia, Promenade, Rabbit House, Sielce, and Warszawianka. It also includes Bernardyńska Woda, a pond formed from the remains of a moat of the Fort Che, dating to the 1880s. The western boundary of Lower Mokotów is marked by the peaks of the Warsaw Escarpment, while a portion of its southwestern border is marked by the Służewiec Stream.

== Religion ==
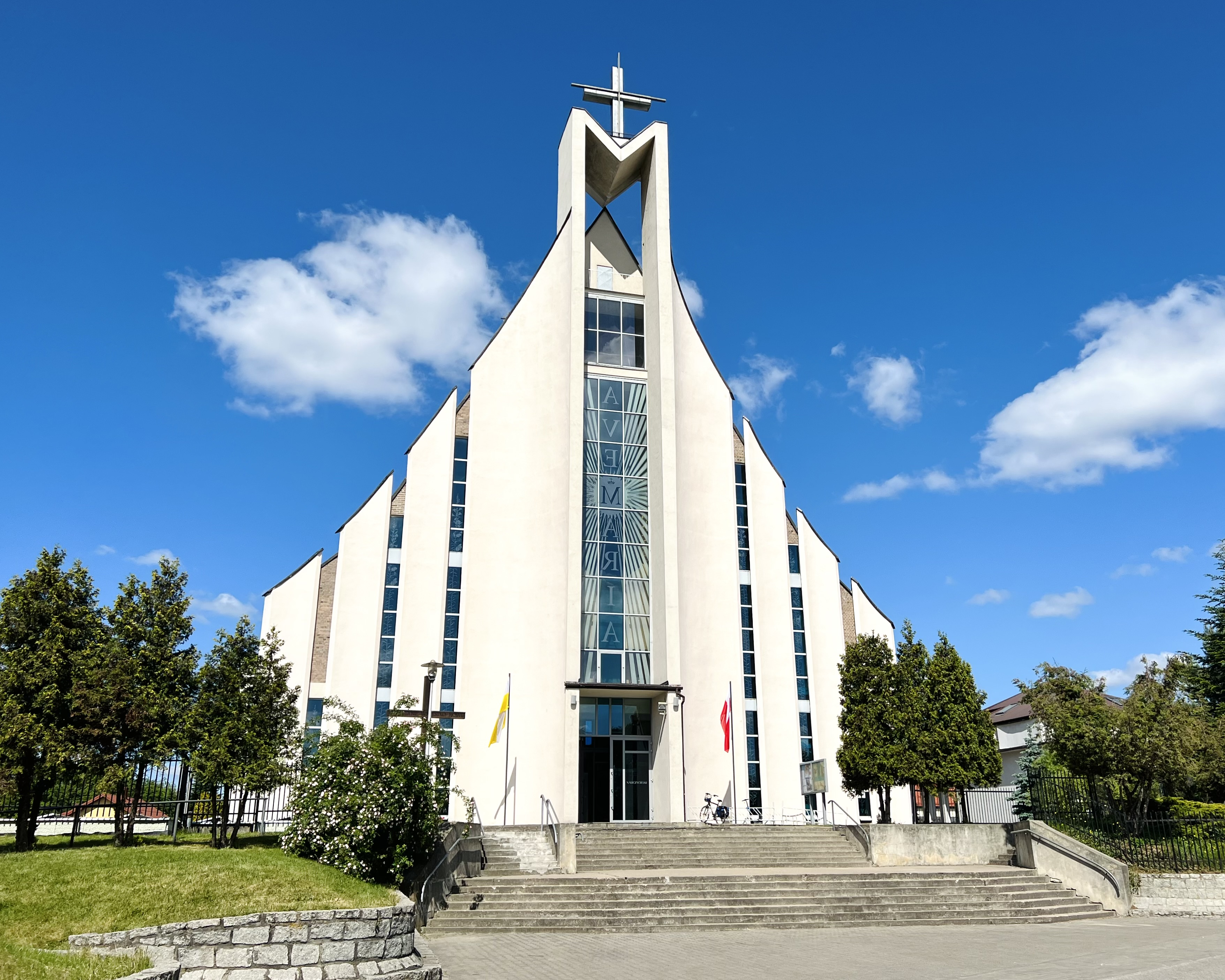
The Sanctuary of Our Lady the Teacher of the Youth.

Lower Mokotów includes several Roman Catholic parish churches. Among them is the St. Anthony of Padua Church, located at 2 and 4 Czerniakowska Street in Czerniaków, which dates to 1693. It is cojoined with a monastery of Bernardines. The other historic churches in the area include St. Joseph the Betrothed Church built in 1926, and the St. Casimir Church built in 1934, both located in Sielce. The neighbourhood of Siekierki also features Sanctuary of Our Lady the Teacher of the Youth, located at 3 Gwintowa Street. managed by the Piarist order, was built in place, where Władysława Papis have claimed to have experienced a private revelation in form of repeated apparitions of Virgin Mary, Jesus, and other religious symbols, between 1943 and 1949. Other Roman Catholic parish churches in the area include the St. Thaddeus the Apostle Church in Sadyba, and the Church of the Most Holy Virgin Mary the Mother of Divine Mercy and the St. Anthony Maria Zaccaria Church in Stegny. The neighbourhood of Sadyba also includes the Czerniaków Cemetery, located at 44 and 46 Powsińska Street. Additionally, the Beit Warszawa Synagogue, which belongs to the Reform Jewish denomination, is located at 9 Stępińska Street in Sielce.

== Transport ==
Lower Mokotów is crossed by Beck Avenue, which forms a part of the Siekieri Route, a thoroughfare connecting west and east banks of Vistula river, via the Siekierki Bridge, a 500-metre-long (1640 ft) cable-stayed bridge. It is also passed through by Vistula Way, a thoroughfare crossing the city on the north–south axis. The area also features tracks of the tram line along several streets in the neighbourhoods in Sadyba, Siekierki, and Sielce.

== Subdivisions ==
The subdivision of the Mokotów district into twelve City Information System areas. Its eastern portion constitutes Lower Mokotów.

Lower Mokotów forms the eastern side of the Mokotów district. It contains six out of its twelve City Information System areas, the subdivisions of the municipal standardised system of street signage in Warsaw. They are: Augustówka, Czerniaków, Sadyba, Siekierki, Sielce, and Stegny. The district is also subdivided into five neighbourhoods governed by elected councils. Three of them, Augustówka, Sadyba, and Siekierki, are located within Lower Mokotów.
