= Augustówka =

Neighbourhood in Warsaw, Poland

- City Information System area (neighbourhood)
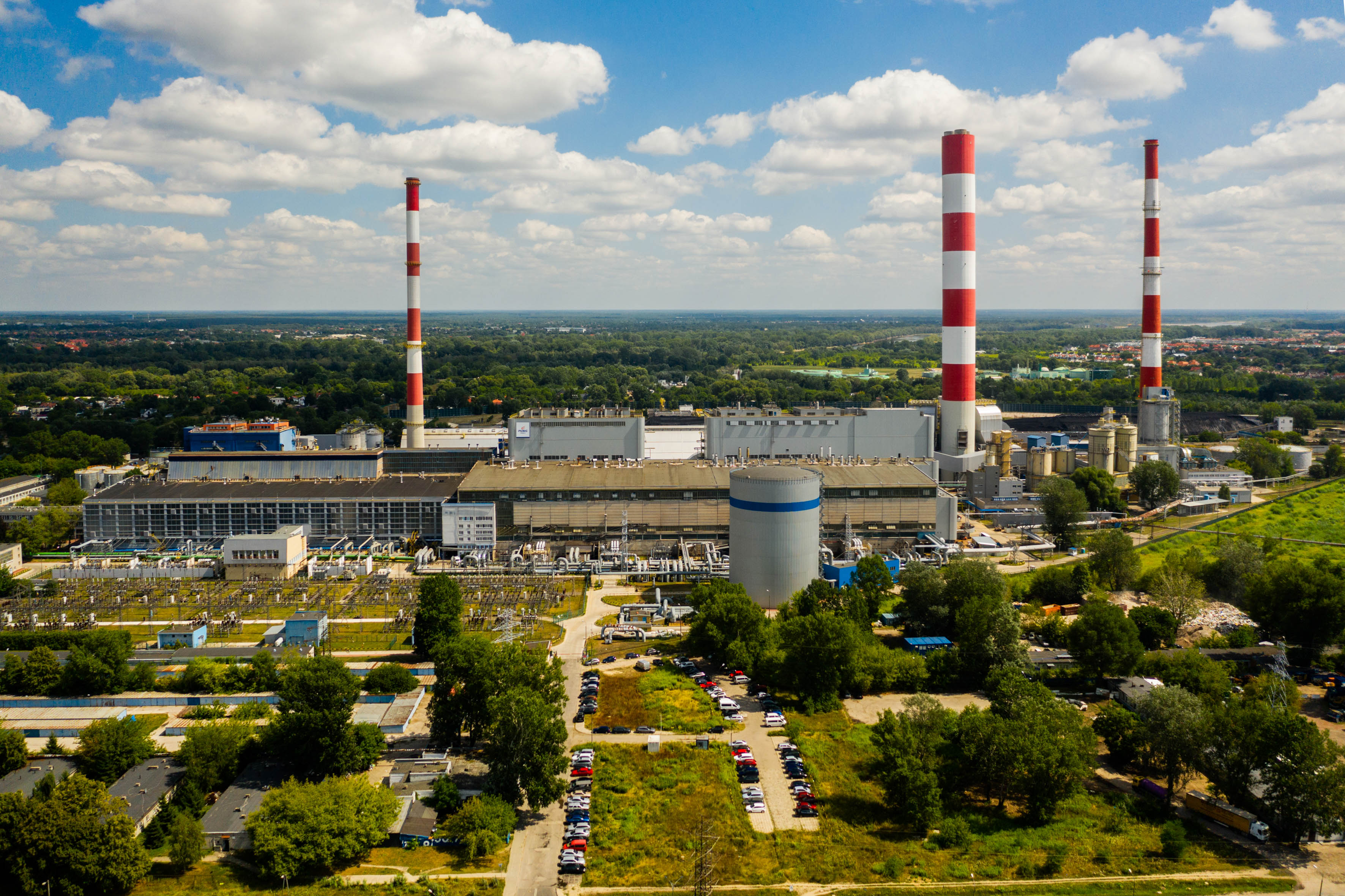
- The Siekierki Cogeneration Plant in Augustówka.

- The location of Augustówka within the Mokotów district.
- Coordinates: 52°11′26″N 21°04′55″E
- Country: Poland
- Voivodeship: Masovian Voivodeship
- City county: Warsaw
- District: Mokotów
- Subregion: Lower Mokotów
- Administrative neighbourhood: Augustówka
- Time zone: UTC+1 (CET)
  - Summer (DST): UTC+2 (CEST)

Augustówka (Polish: [aw.ɡusˈtuf.ka]) is a neighbourhood, and a City Information System area, in Warsaw, Poland, within the Mokotów district. The area is part of its eastern half, known as the Lower Mokotów. The neighbourhood is a loosely-populated area, predominantly urbanized in its south, featuring low-rise single-family housing. It features the Siekierki Cogeneration Plant, the largest combined heat and power plant in Poland. Augustówka lies on the west coast of the Vistula river, and includes the Czerniaków Lake, the largest still body of fresh water in the city.

By the 19th century, Augustówka was a small farming community. In 1890, the Fort X was built near the village, as part of the series of the city fortifications known as the Warsaw Fortress. Augustówka was incorporated into the city in 1951. In 1961, the Siekierki Cogeneration Plant was opened in its area.

== History ==
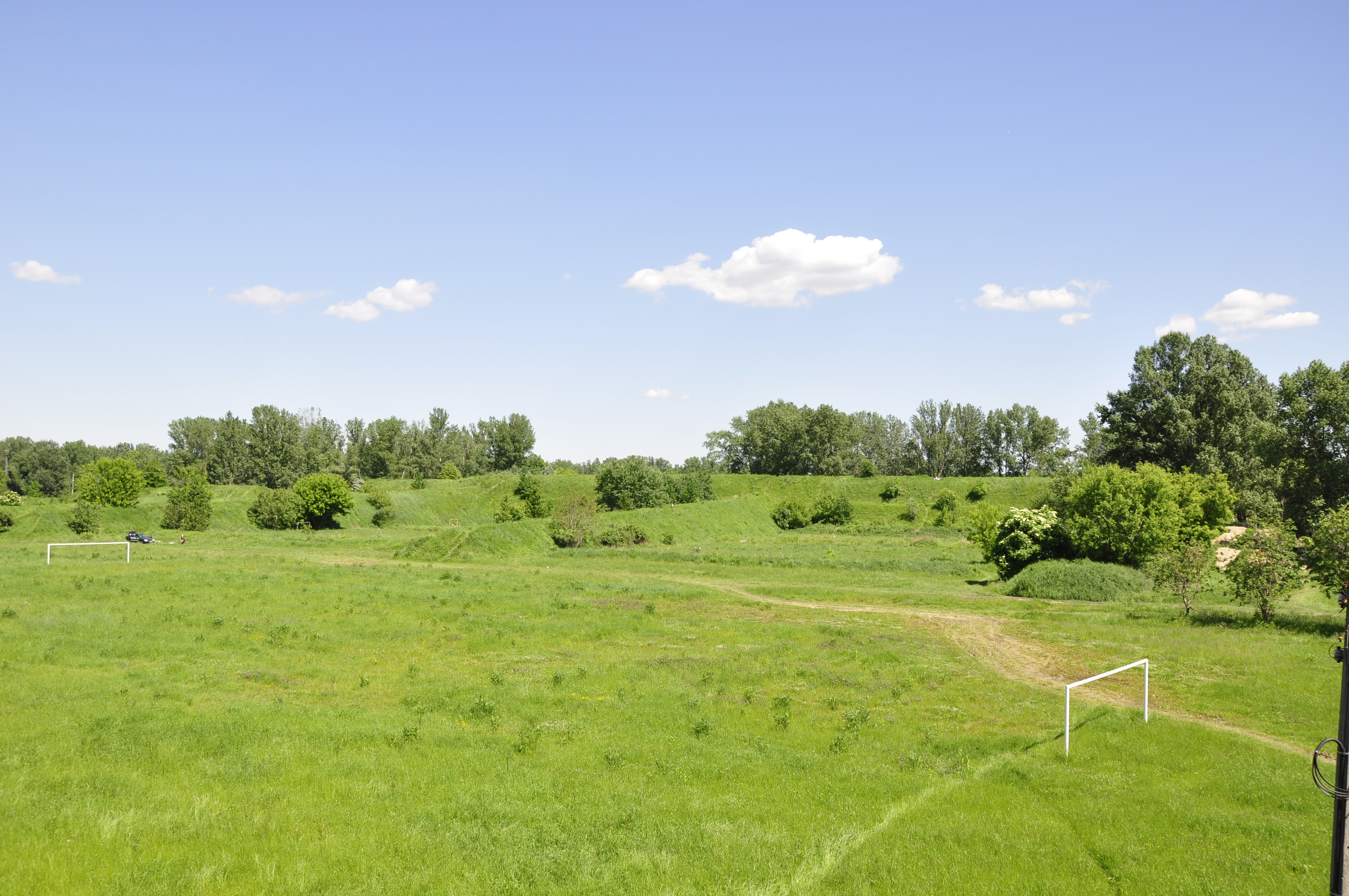
The ruins of Fort X in Augustówka, in form of distorted land formations. The structed was built in 1890, and demolished in 1913.

By the 19th century, the village of Augustówka was a small faming community. On 13 January 1867, it became part of the rural municipality of Wilanów, established as part of the administrative reform in the Kingdom of Poland. From 20 October 1933, Augustówka was one of its thirteen gromadas (village assemblies).

Between 1883 and 1890, the Fort X "Augustówka" was built near Vistula river, and the current Beck Avenue. It was constructed by the Russian Empire, as part of the Warsaw Fortress, a series of fortifications around the city. It was decommissioned in 1909, and partially demolished in 1913. In the 1880s, the Wolica Moat was also dug out between the Fort X and the Czerniaków Lake, as part of the fortifications.

In 1939, the Polish Armed Forces used the ruins of Fort X as defensive position against advancing forces of the German Army, during the siege of Warsaw in the Second World War. In 1944, the ruins were used by the German soldiers during the defense from the Red Army of the Soviet Union. After the war, the area had been used as a military shooting range.

In 1943, Augustówka had 482 inhabitants. On 15 May 1951, the municipality of Wilanów, including Augustówka, was incorporated into the city of Warsaw.

In 1961, the Siekierki Cogeneration Plant, the largest combined heat and power plant in Poland, was opened at 30 Augustówka Street. The government planned to develop a science park in Augustówka and Siekierki by constructing a complex of research facilities along with corresponding housing developments. However, the increasing economic crisis halted the project.

On 4 October 1996, the Mokotów district was subdivided into twelve City Information System areas, with Augustówka becoming one of them.

In 2002, the Siekieri Route, a thoroughfare connecting the west and east banks of the Vistula river, was opened crossing neighbourhood, including Bem Avenue, and the Siekierki Bridge on the Vistula river. In 2004, the land adjacent to the river was designated as a conservation area under the Natura 2000 program. Between 2005 and 2008, it was planned to develop a technology and science park in Siekierki and Augustówka, codenamed the Warsaw Technology Park, however, the project was abandoned.

On 9 December 2025, the administrative neighbourhood of Augustówka was established, as a subdivision of the Mokotów district, governed by an elected neighbourhood council. Its boundaries are marked by Piramowicza Street, the Vistula river, Wilanówka river, the border of the Mokotów district, Łucznicza Street, Zawodzie Street, and Augustówka Street.

== Characteristics ==
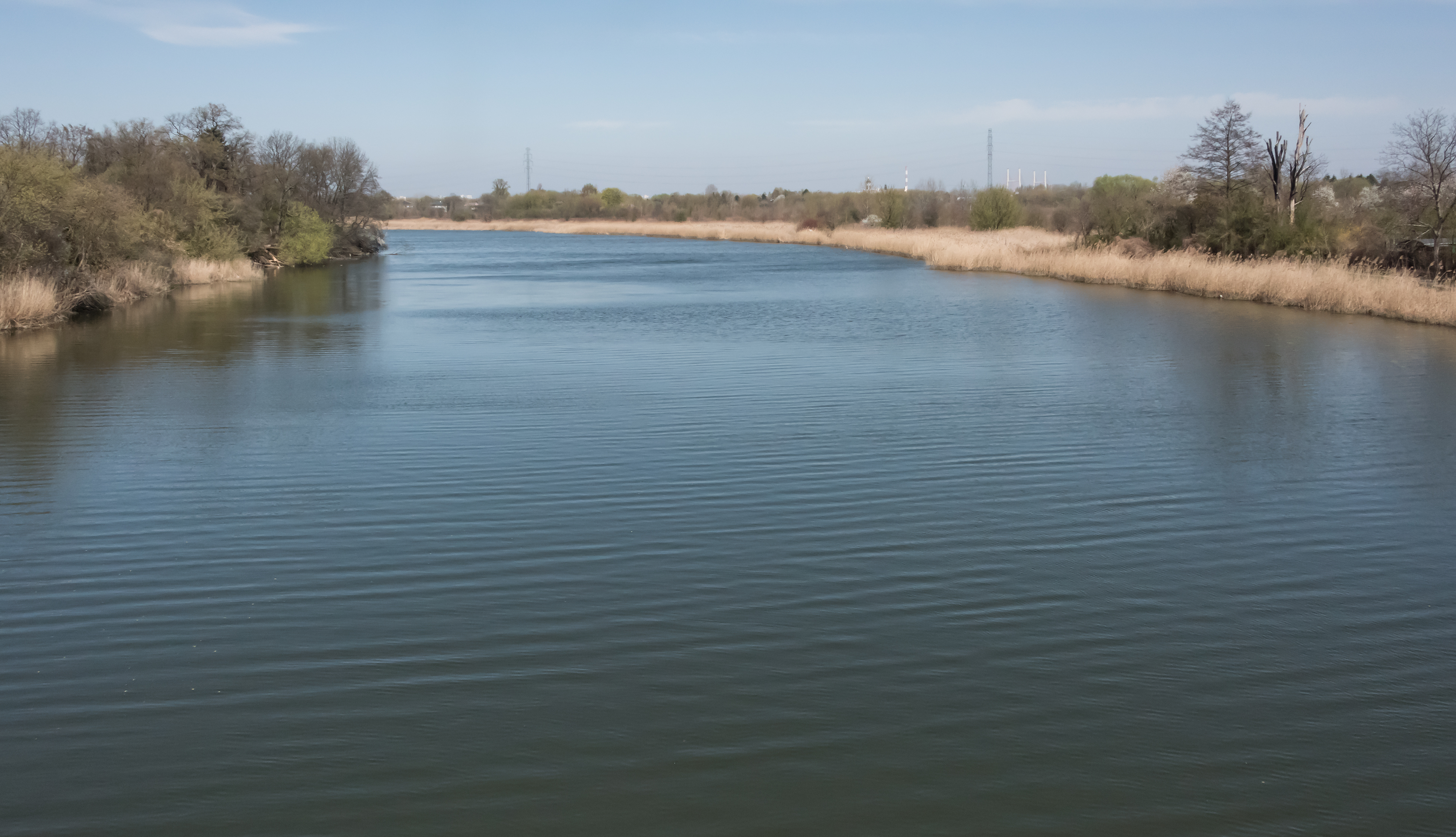
The Czerniaków Lake in Augustówka, the largest still body of fresh water in Warsaw.

Augustówka is a loosely-populated area, predominantly urbanized in its south, featuring low-rise single-family housing. It also includes warehouse. The area features the Siekierki Cogeneration Plant, the largest combined heat and power plant in Poland, located at 30 Augustówka Street. It also functions as one of the facilities of the Institute of Energy, the state-owned research organisation of energy transfer. Its northern boundary is marked by Beck Avenue, which forms a part of the Siekieri Route, a thoroughfare connecting the west and east banks of the Vistula river, via the Siekierki Bridge, a 500-metre-long (1640 ft) cable-stayed bridge.

To the east, the neighbourhood borders the Vistula river, with the land adjacent to its coast being designated as a conservation area under the Natura 2000 program. The southeast border of Augustówka is also marked by the Wilanówka river, which outflows to the Vistula. In the east, the neighbourhood features the Czerniaków Lake, which, together with surrounding it area, has the status of a conservation area. With an area of 19.5 ha, it is the largest fresh water lake in Warsaw. It is also a bathing lake with a beach, the only in the city with such legal status. The lake is also the outflow destination of two man-made water canals, the Siekierki Canal in the north, and Canal W in the south. In the north, Augustówka also has the Siekierki Lake, an oxbow lake, which together with surrounding land, has a status of a conservation area.

In the northeast, the neighborhood also features the ruins of the Fort X, together with its. It was part of the fortifications of the Warsaw Fortress, dating to 1890, and demolished in 1913. The area also features the Wolica Moat in the northeast, which was also created in the 1890s as part of the city fortifications.

== Boundaries and subdivision ==
Augustówka is a City Information System area in Warsaw, located in the northeastern portion of the Mokotów district, within the subregion of Lower Mokotów. Its boundaries are approximately determined to the north by Beck Avenue and the Siekierki Bridge; to the east by the Vistula river; to the south by the Wilanówka river, the boundary of the Mokotów district, Łucznicza Street, Zawodzie Street, and Austówka Street; and to the west around the houses at Rymanowska Street; Okrężna Street, Rembowski Square, Jeziorna Street, Gołkowska Street, Czerniaków Lake, Siekierki Canal, and around the houses at Rymanowska Street. The neighbourhood borders Siekierki to the north, Gocław to the northeast, Las and Zerzeń to the east, Wilanów Niski and Zawady to the south, and Czerniaków and Sadyba to the west. Its boundaries form the borders of the Mokotów district with Praga-South to the northeast, Wawer to the east, and Wilanów to the south..

The southeastern portion of the City Information System area forms the administrative neighbourhood of Augustówka, a subdivision of the Mokotów district, governed by an elected neighbourhood council. Its boundaries are marked by Piramowicza Street, the Vistula river, Wilanówka river, the border of the Mokotów district, Łucznicza Street, Zawodzie Street, and Augustówka Street.
