= Tadeusz Koźluk Medical Academy of Warsaw =

Private university in Warsaw, Poland

Coordinates: 52°12′05″N 21°02′45″E

- Warszawska Uczelnia Medyczna im. Tadeusza Koźluka
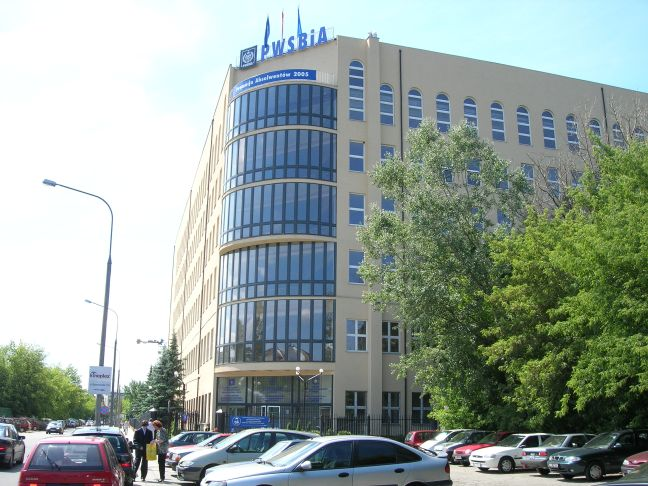
- Type: Private school
- Established: 1991
- Officer in charge: Rector
- Rector: Tadeusz Kozluk
- Location: Warsaw, Poland
- Website: http://pwsbia.edu.pl/

The Tadeusz Koźluk Medical Academy of Warsaw (Polish: Warszawska Uczelnia Medyczna im. Tadeusza Koźluka) is a private university in Poland.

== Senior staff ==
Founder of the university, Tadeusz Kozluk is the rector.

== Fields of study ==
- Law
- Administration
- Administration with a specialization in Diplomacy
- Computer Science
- Economics

In Law possible specializations are

- Economic law
- Civil law
- Criminal Law
- Public international law
- Comparative constitutional law

In Administration specializations are

- Engineering for sustainable development of environmental protection
- State fiscal policy and tax law
- Local government in Poland and the EU
- State and local authorities on the problems of health, security and public order

of bodies of state administration and local emergency and crisis

- Sociology of work and social policy

In Diplomacy specializations are

- International organizations and institutions
- Right to diplomatic and consular diplomacy, bilateral, treaties and international negotiations
- Diplomacy, international organizations and non-governmental organizations
- Contemporary threats to peace and security worldwide

In Economics specializations are

- Intermediation and real estate valuation in the EU
- Economics of tourist companies, hotel and sports
- Banking, credit, liquidity risk and capital
- Penetration of foreign markets in a globalizing world
- Business journalism
- Sociology of work and social policy

In Computer Science specializations are

- Computer automation and robotics
- Computer systems security engineering
- Software manufacturing techniques
- Multimedia techniques
- Programming and management of web-based applications

In 2006, the only non-public school in Warsaw PWSBiA opened a new specialization in the area of computing: Computer Automation and Robotics. The task of this course is to train graduates combining specialist skills in the field of computer technology and a specialist in the field of modern automation.

== Campus ==
The campus occupies three hectares in Warsaw. The campus buildings have a total area of 66,000 m. The university is located at ul. Bobrowiecka 9, in Warsaw.
