= Siekierki Cogeneration Plant =

Poland's largest heat and power plant in Warsaw

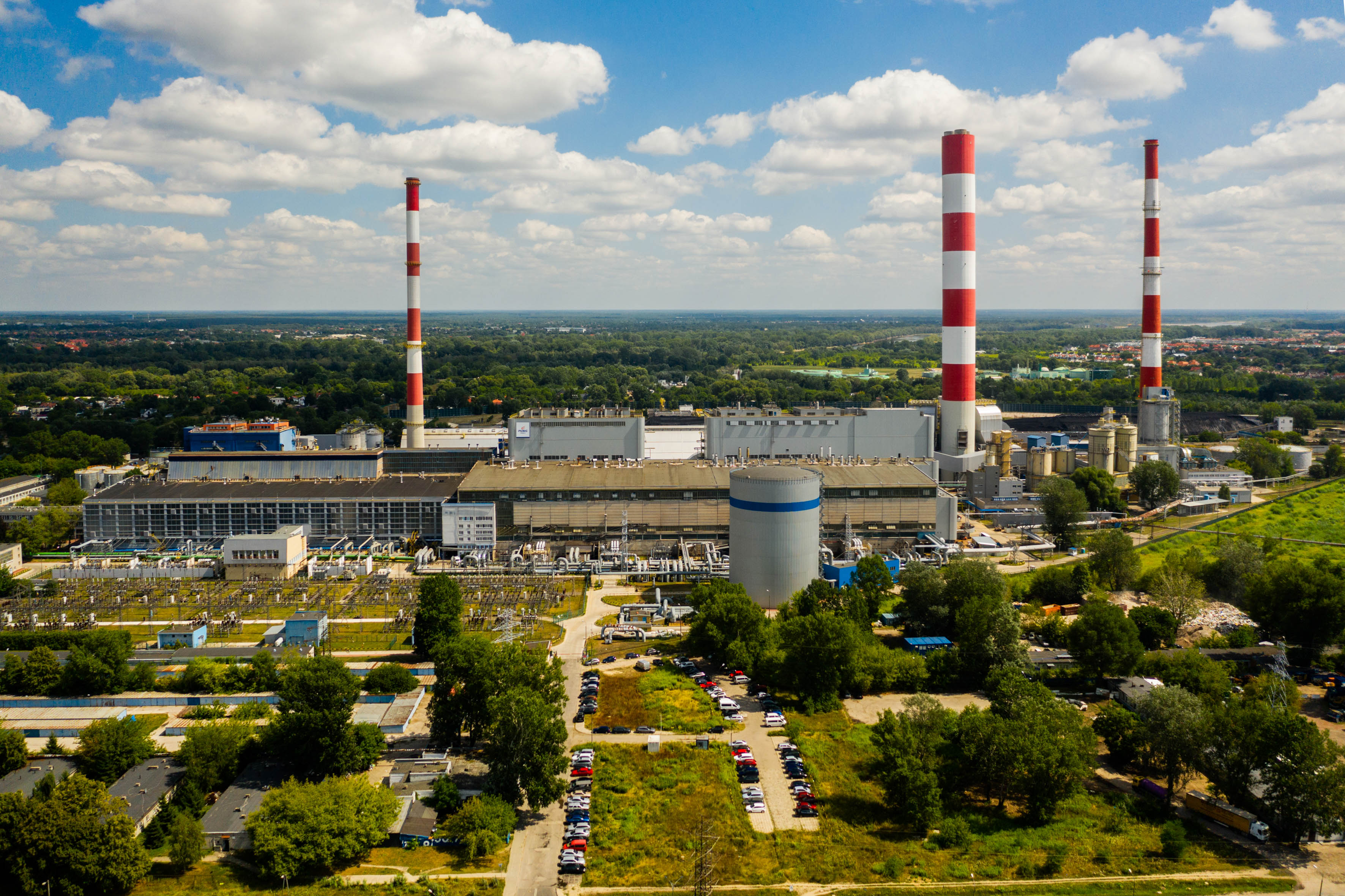
- Official name: Elektrociepłownia Siekierki
- Country: Poland
- Location: Siekierki, Warsaw
- Coordinates: 52°11′17″N 21°5′24″E
- Status: Operational
- Construction began: 1958
- Commission date: 1961
- Owner: Vattenfall
- Operator: PGNiG

Thermal power station
- Primary fuel: Coal
- Thermal capacity: 2,081 MW

Power generation
- Nameplate capacity: 622 MW

External links
- Commons: Related media on Commons

Siekierki Cogeneration Plant (Polish: Elektrociepłownia Siekierki) is a combined heat and power plant at Augustówka in Warsaw, Poland. It has an installed heat capacity of 2,081 MW and power generation capacity of 622 MW. Construction work on the station started in 1958, and in 1961 the first 50 MW unit went in service. Three further units followed in 1962, increasing its power to 200 MW.

Further units, increasing the power of the station to 600 MW were built between 1974 and 1978.

On April 26, 1976 a turbine disintegrated, whereby one blade shot through the roof and a fire broke out. A further fire occurred on June 2, 2010.

Previously owned by Vattenfall it is now owned by PGNiG.

== Technical data ==
The length of the building is 400 metres (1,300 ft). The power station has a heat reservoir 47 metres (154 ft) tall and a volume of 30,400 cubic metres (1,070,000 cu ft). The power station has five flue gas stacks.

Name	Year of built	Pinnacle height	Coordinates	Remarks
Chimney 1	1961	120 m	52.191437°N 21.089142°E	demolished in 2009
Chimney 2	1972	200 m	52.189921°N 21.088965°E	demolished in 2011
Chimney 3	1977	200 m	52.187181°N 21.088831°E	
Chimney 4	2009	200 m	52.188329°N 21.088858°E	
Chimney 5	2009	170 m	52.191029°N 21.089351°E	
