= St. Anthony of Padua Church (Czerniaków) =

Church of St. Anthony of Padua in Czerniaków
- Kościół św. Antoniego z Padwy na Czerniakowie
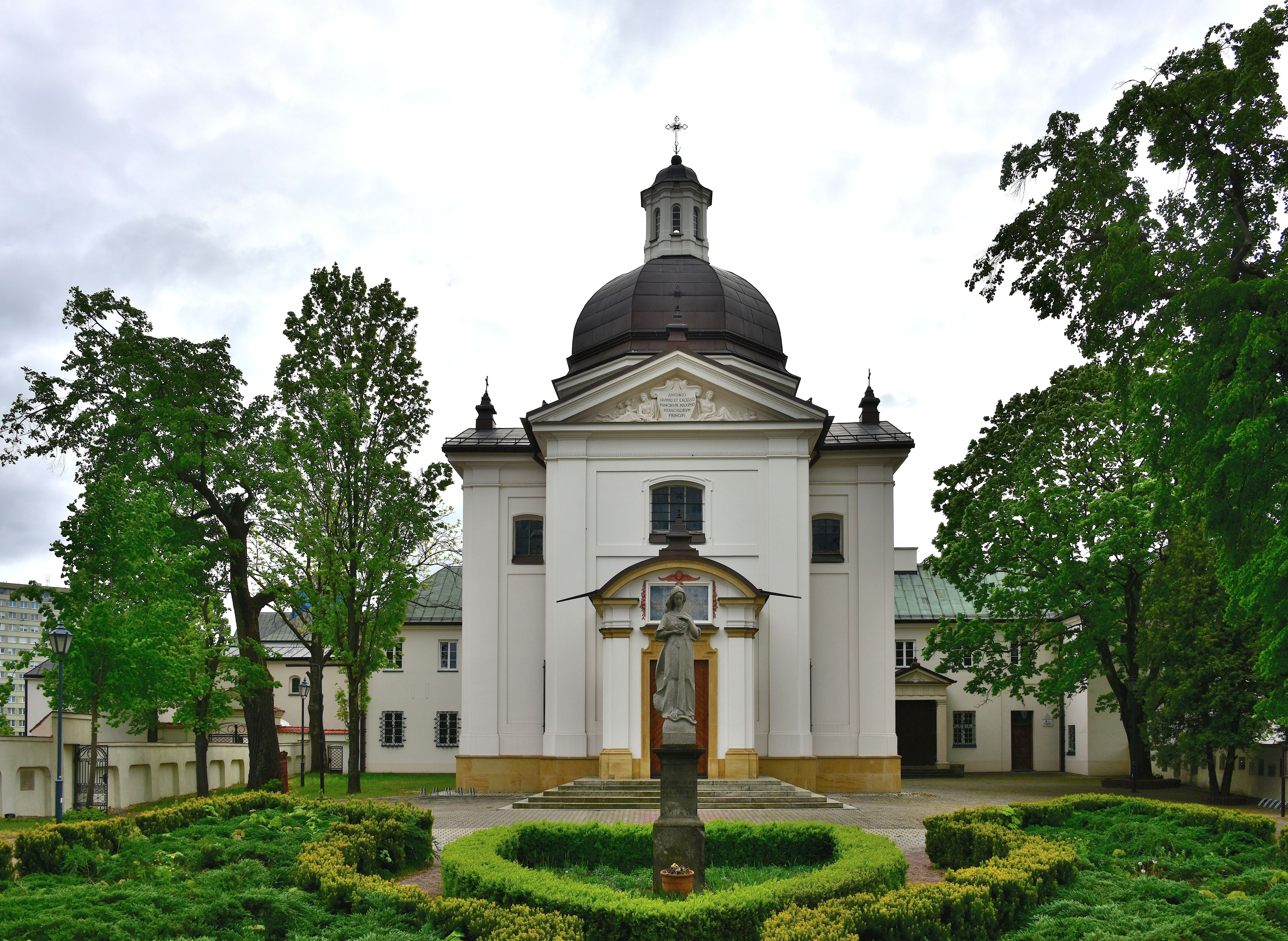
- The Church of St. Anthony of Padua in Czerniaków
- Church of St. Anthony of Padua in Czerniaków
- 52.193889°N 21.055833°E
- Location: Warsaw
- Country: Poland
- Denomination: Roman Catholic

Architecture
- Architect: Tylman van Gameren
- Groundbreaking: 1690
- Completed: 1693

Administration
- Archdiocese: Warsaw

The Church of St. Anthony of Padua (Polish: Kościół św. Antoniego Padewskiego) is the parish church of the Parish of St. Boniface in Czerniaków, Warsaw.

== History ==
Built from the foundation of the Grand Marshal of the Crown, Stanisław Herakliusz Lubomirski, the owner of Czerniaków (from 1683), it was originally planned as a family mausoleum. Designed by the royal architect Tylman van Gameren, the Italian builder Izydor Affaita supervised the construction between 1690 and 1693. A monastery was built at the same time. In the first half of the 19th century the monastery was expanded with a western wing, facing the road leading towards Wilanów. In 1864 the Bernardine convent was closed.

The church and monastery suffered primarily in 1939 during the defense of Warsaw and in 1944, during the Warsaw Uprising including damage to the sculptures and painted decorations, roof and imagery. From 1951 to 1954 it was maintained by art conservator Bohdan Marconi, and thorough restoration work was performed between 1985 and 1994.

This church was never rebuilt and preserved in its original baroque decor. The only original pieces of equipment are the 19th century organs and oak paneling. An earlier, probably 18th century, instrument was moved to an unspecified church outside of Warsaw.

== Architecture ==
The church was built on the plan of a Greek cross coupled with an octagonal sanctuary, and at the intersection of the arms of the cross, a dome was built on the drum. The structure of the church has an interesting arrangement where the proportions have retained their original appearance including the interior which did not undergo major changes, keeping the decor from the end of the 17th century.

The decor of the interior painting shows the life and work of the church's patron, St Anthony of Padua, with 63 of 69 images showing scenes from the life of the patron saint. In the nave there is a series of eight vertical paintings which show scenes of healings performed by him, and the last of the frescoes shows the moment of his death. At the altar is a picture of St. Anthony which is considered miraculous. In the chancel, frescos show the story of the construction of the temple.

The side altars are images of St. Francis and the famous Renaissance triptych, painted on glass, the "Lamentation of Christ", which was a gift from King John III Sobieski. The frescoes in the church were inspired by the founder, and are attributed to either Francesco Antonio Giorgioliemu or Tylman van Gameren.

At the main altar is a reliquary of the martyr St. Boniface, which Lubomirski had received from Pope Innocent XII in 1693 during a pilgrimage to Rome. Because of the reliquary and its relation to the cult of the martyr, there was a pilgrimage here until the dissolution of the monastery resulting from the January Uprising. St. Boniface became the patron of the parish, and the cult of the saint is inextricably linked to it (a pilgrimage and indulgence on May 14).

In the courtyard of the churchyard is a classical chapel dedicated to St. Boniface from 1839.

== Details ==
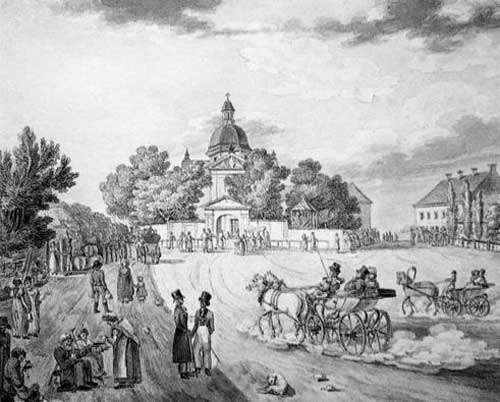
"View of the church in Czerniaków", by Aleksander Majerski, (1818)

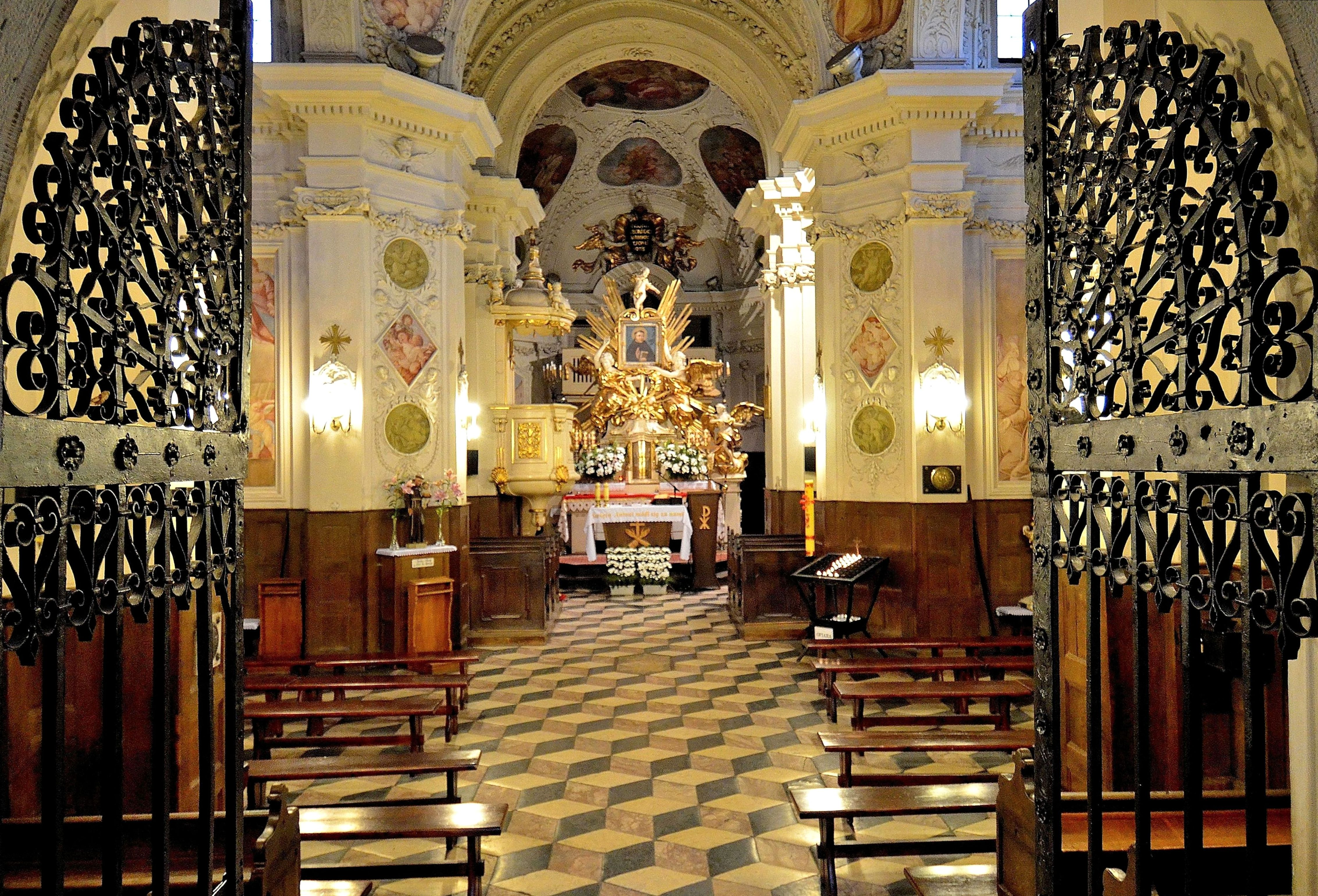
The interior of the church

- The area near the church is the former cemetery which leads to the gate from the first half of the 19th century, which is crowned with the coat of arms of its founders - Lubomirski.
- On the inner side wall of the church, once a cemetery, there are memorials commemorating soldiers from the 14th Regiment of Lancers, Jazłowiec, who died in 1939, and local residents killed and murdered during World War II.
- The frescoes in the church depict, among others, musical angels. The instruments they play are a reflection of the composition of the Royal Orchestra's instruments in Warsaw at the end of the 17th century.
- The organs and chorus are not located above the main entrance, but behind the altar - unusually located at the center of the chancel.
- Standing on the northern side is a neo-Gothic gate - the bell tower from the first half of the 19th century is decorated with the coat of arms of the Ossolińskis, who followed the Lubomirski's as Czerniaków's owners.
- The iron trellis leading from the vestibule to the nave of the church dates from the 17th century and was designed by Tylman van Gameren. This is the second trellis made to this input, the first was probably a result of a mistake by a blacksmith which was impressive but too large - it was used in the construction of the Kotowski chapel in St. Hyacinth's Church (also designed by Tylman van Gameren) in Warsaw, where is today. Both grids are almost identical, differing only in size; the grille in Czerniaków also bears the bullet marks from the Warsaw Uprising.
- The church contains a 17th-century image of Our Lady of Fraskiej from a former Bernardine church in the Ukrainian town of Fraga.
- The monastery building, closed after the dissolution of the Order for secular use, has changed considerably, but only the corridor closest to the church has retained its old baroque architecture.

== See also ==
- 17th-century Western domes
