= Smolenski =

Smolenski or Smoleński (Polish feminine: Smoleńska; plural: Smoleńscy) is a toponymic surname. As a Polish surname, it may be associated with the places named Smolensk, Smoleń, Smolno.

Notable people with this surname include:

- Anna Smoleńska (1920–1943), Polish WWII resistance member
- Dionizy Smoleński (1902–1984), Polish scientist
- Don Smolenski, American businessman
- John Smolenski (historian) (born 1973), American historian
- John Smolenski (politician) (1891–1953), American politician
- Józef Smoleński (1894–1978), Polish general
- Martin Smolenski (born 2003), Bulgarian footballer
- Piotr Smoleński (died 1942), Polish cryptologist
- Tadeusz Samuel Smoleński (1884–1909), Polish Egyptologist
- Władysław Smoleński (1851–1926), Polish historian

== See also ==
- Smolensky (surname)
- Smoliński
