= Memorial to the Fighting Mokotów of 1944 =

Sculpture in Szczecin, Poland

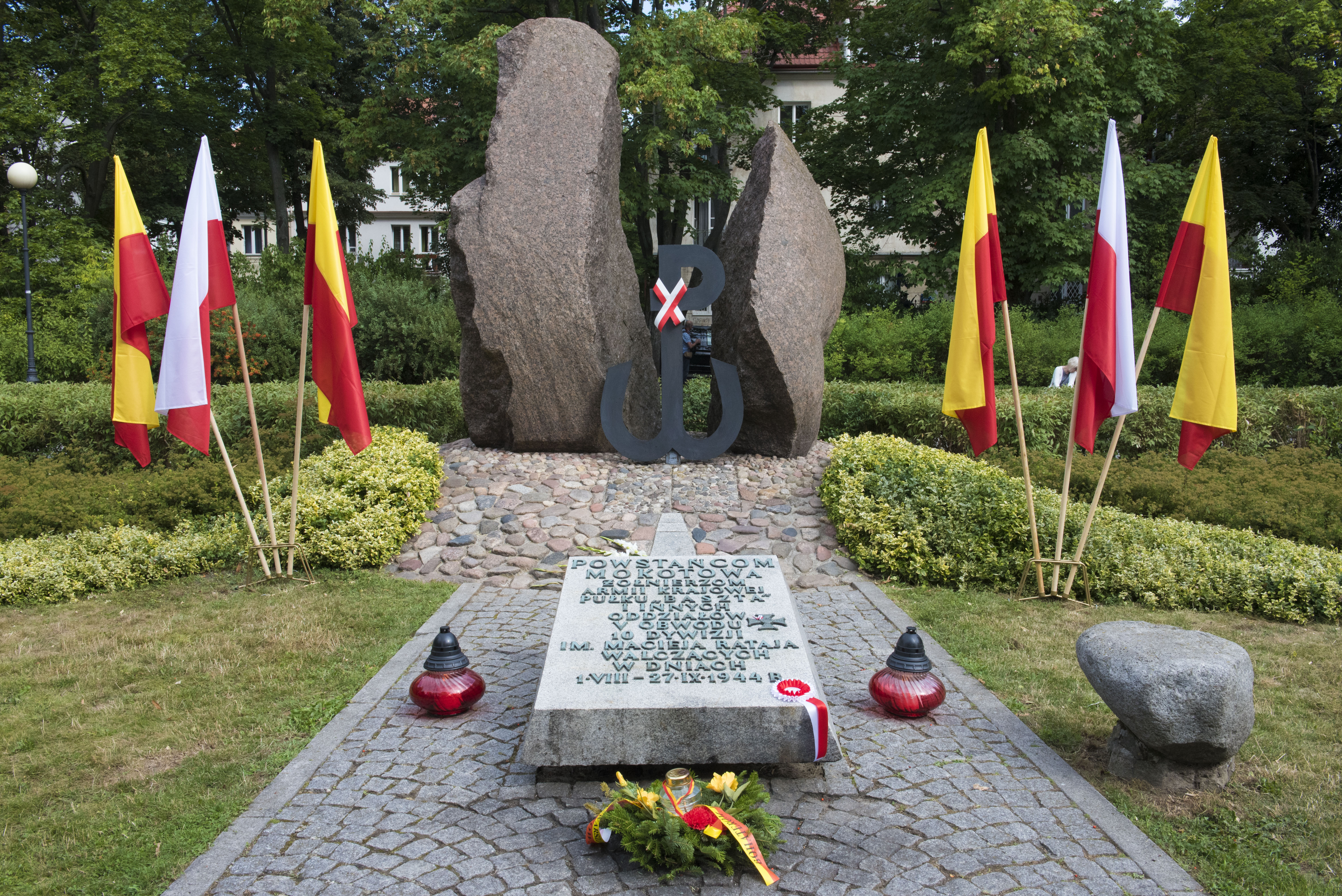
- The monument in 2019.
- Interactive map of Memorial to the Fighting Mokotów of 1944
- Location: Dreszer Park, Mokotów, Warsaw, Poland
- Coordinates: 52.197543°N 21.020618°E
- Designer: Eugeniusz Ajewski
- Type: Sculpture
- Material: Metal, stone
- Opening date: 1 August 1985

The Memorial to the Fighting Mokotów of 1944 (Polish: Pomnik Mokotów Walczący 1944), also known as the Mokotów Insurgents Memorial (Polish: Pomnik Powstańców Mokotowa), is a monument in Warsaw, Poland, within the Mokotów district. It is placed in the Dreszer Park, near Ursynowska Street, within the neighbourhood of Wierzbno. The monument is dedicated to the insurgents of the Warsaw Uprising who fought in the Mokotów district, including the park, between 1 August and 27 September 1944. It was designed by Eugeniusz Ajewski, and unveiled on 1 August 1985.

== History ==
In 1944, during the Warsaw Uprising in the Second World War, the Dreszer Park became a defensive point of the Polish resistance insurgents, predominantly from the Baszta Regiment Group of the Home Army, who defended their position from German forces attacking from the north between 2 and 13 August 1944, and from the south, between 25 and 27 September 1944. During the conflict, the park was also used as a provisional cemetery, both for the fallen Polish resistance fighters and the civilian casualties. After the end of the conflict, the bodies were exhumated and relocated to the proper cemeteries.

The monument dedicated to the insurgents of the Warsaw Uprising who fought in the Mokotów district, was unveiled in the Dreszer Park, on 1 August 1985, on the 41st anniversary of the beginning of the uprising. It was designed by Eugeniusz Ajewski.

== Characteristics ==
The memorial is placed in northwestern portion of the Dreszer Park, near Ursynowska Street. It consists of a glacial erratic rock broken into two parts, with a metal sculpture of the Anwil, the emblem of the Polish Underground State and the Home Army during the Second World War. It has a form of a ligature of the letters P and W, symbolizing term Polska Walcząca, which in Polish, means "Fighting Poland". In front of the sculpture is placed a plaque with a text commemorating the fighters. It reads:

Polish inscription

Powstańcom Mokotwa
Żołnierzą Armii Krajowej Pułku „Baszta”
i innych oddziałów V obwodu 10 dywizji im. Macieja Rataja
walczących w dniach 1·VIII – 27 ·IX·1944 r.

Translation:
English translation

To the Insurgents from Mokotów
The soldiers of the Baszta Regiment of the Home Army
and other units of the Maciej Rataj 5th Division
which fought between 1 August and 27 September 1944
