= John Smolenski =

John Smolenski may refer to:

- John Smolenski (historian) (born 1973), American historian
- John Smolenski (politician) (1891–1953), American politician
