= Dom Prasy =

Polish press concern functioning in Warsaw in term 1922-1939

Dom Prasy (Polish for "Press House") was a Polish news corporation of the 1920s and 1930s, as well as a name of the eponymous building in Warsaw, where it had its headquarters. It published numerous daily newspapers and weekly journals. Taken over by the Germans during World War II, the company's assets became the cornerstone of the Nowy Kurier Warszawski propaganda newspaper. After the war the Dom Prasy's assets became the foundation of several modern newspapers, including Życie Warszawy.

== Company ==
The company was founded in 1922 as a private venture. The titles and mastheads of most titles were printed in red, which gained the company a popular nickname of Czerwona prasa or Koncern Czerwonej Prasy – the Red Press Concern. In the 1930s the company published and printed numerous daily newspapers: Kurier Czerwony, Expres Poranny, Dobry Wieczór - Kurier Czerwony and Dzień Dobry. In addition, the company also published numerous weeklies, including Panorama 7 dni, Cyrulik Warszawski, Kino and Przegląd Sportowy.

In 1934 the company was taken over by the government of Poland and since then most of its titles became supportive of the ruling Sanacja regime. In 1939, following the Nazi and Soviet Invasion of Poland, all Polish newspapers were disbanded by the German authorities and the company ceased to exist. Its assets were taken over by the German propaganda Nowy Kurier Warszawski, the largest newspaper in German-occupied Poland.

In 1945 the assets of the former Dom Prasy were not returned to the owners. Instead, they were nationalised by the Ministry of Information and Propaganda and donated to the Czytelnik printing house. The new owners rebuilt the building in 1951 and started publishing new newspapers there: Życie Warszawy, Rzeczpospolita and Wieczór. Later that year all titles were taken over by the RSW Prasa cooperative, who continued to use the venue of the former Dom Prasy until 1992.

== Building ==
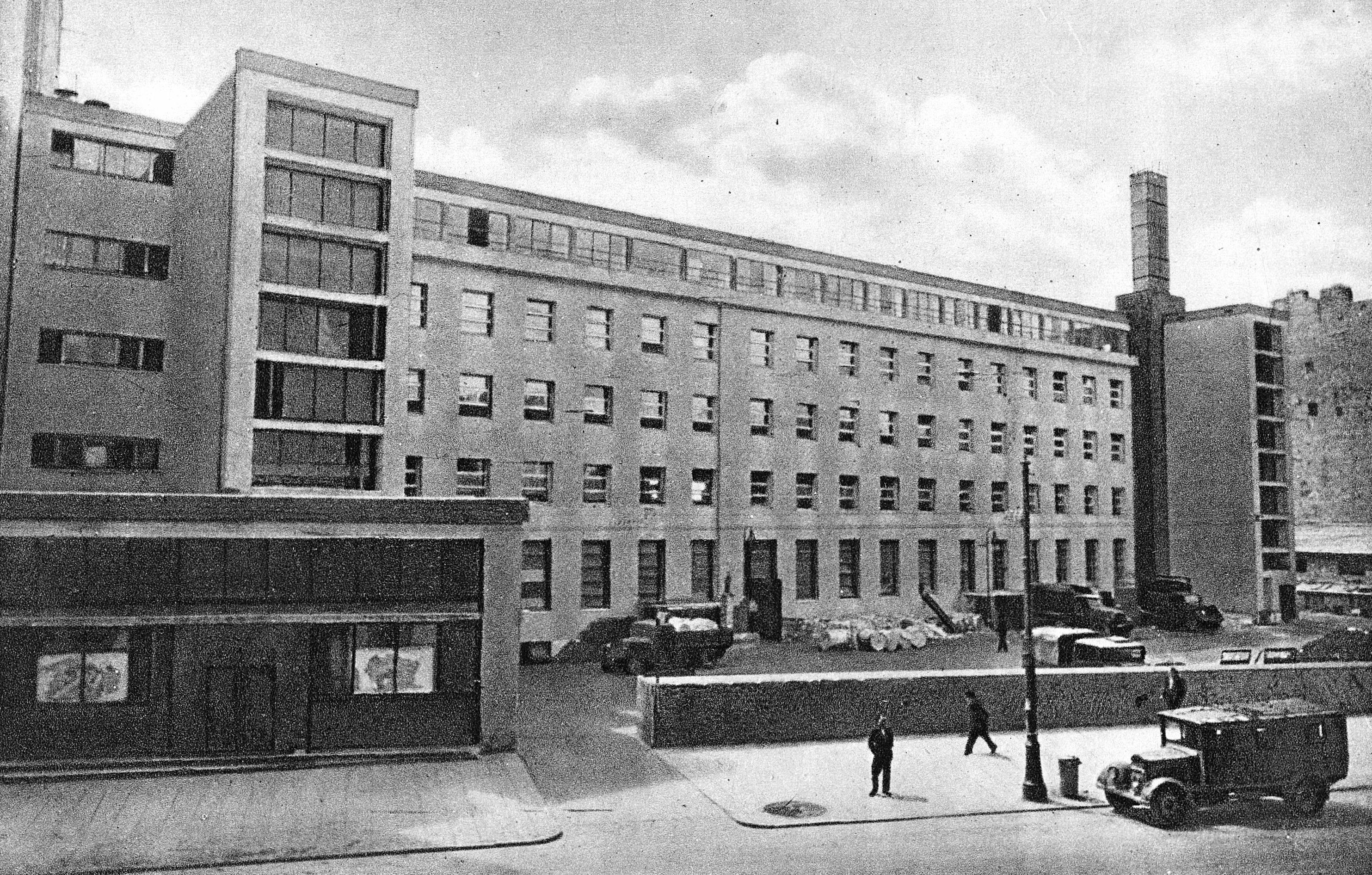
Dom Prasy building at 3/5 Marszałkowska Street in Warsaw

The building commonly referred to as "Dom Prasy" was originally built between 1890 and 1892 on a triangular plot of land between Marszałkowska and Polna Str., at the southern outskirts of Warsaw, close to the Pole Mokotowskie.

The main building, designed for the Bender carpet factory (in 1908 renamed to Warszawska Akcyjna Fabryka Dywanów – Warsaw Carpet Factory Stock Company), occupied the entire length of the Polna street side, with a smaller reception building constructed along Marszałkowska. Because of that it received a dual address: Marszałkowska 3/5 and Polna 4/6. Nearby, at Marszałkowska 8 (Polna 8) a three-story administrative building was constructed. The carpet factory went bankrupt in 1915, after Warsaw had been cut off from its main markets in Imperial Russia by the frontlines of World War I.

In 1927 both buildings were acquired by the Dom Prasy media corporation. Refurbished and rebuilt as a modernist office and printing press building by Maksymilian Goldberg and Hipolit Rutkowski, it became the largest printing press in Warsaw. The main building was extended by one level. The cellars were converted into a boiler station and depots. The ground floor was occupied by the printing press, while upper floors by headquarters of various journals and magazines owned by the Dom Prasy Co.

Dom Prasy Co. owned the building until its dissolution by the German authorities in 1939. The building survived World War II and the Warsaw Uprising, although it was completely burned-out. Modernised in 1951, its reception building along Marszałkowska Street was extended to span the entire length of the plot. At the same time the administrative building was demolished around 1951. The main building continued to serve as the printing press of numerous press titles (notably the Kurier Warszawski and Życie Warszawy – until 1992), with the lower reception building leased to various businesses. In 2011 the building was put on the Registry of Historical Landmarks.

== See also ==
- Dom Prasy Śląskiej in Katowice
