= Smoliński =

Smolinski or Smoliński (feminine: Smolińska; plural: Smolińscy) is a Polish surname. Notable people with the surname include:

- Barbara Smolińska
- Bryan Smolinski (born 1971), American ice hockey player
- Jake Smolinski (born 1989), American baseball player
- Kacper Smoliński (born 2001), Polish footballer
- Lucyna Smolińska (1932–2020), Polish journalist, screenwriter and documentary film director
- Marcin Smoliński (born 1985), Polish footballer
- Martin Smolinski (born 1984), German motorcycle rider
- Mark Smolinski (born 1939), American football player
- Nina Smolińska, Polish biologist, specialist in endocrinology and animal reproduction
- Rafał Smoliński (born 1977), Polish rower
- Teresa Smolińska, Polish folklorist, literary scholar, culture scholar, ethnologist
- Włodzimierz Smoliński (1938–2018), Polish wrestler
- Zdzisław Smoliński (1942–1993), Polish athlete

== See also ==
- Smolenski
