= Anna Smoleńska =

Auschwitz-Birkenau prisoner from Poland

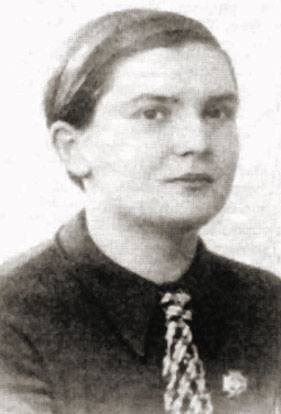
- Smoleńska, nom de guerre Hania
- Born: Anna Smoleńska; 28 February 1920; Warsaw, Poland
- Died: 19 March 1943 (aged 23); Auschwitz-Birkenau, German-occupied Poland
- Resting place: Auschwitz concentration camp
- Occupations: Student of art history, girl scout

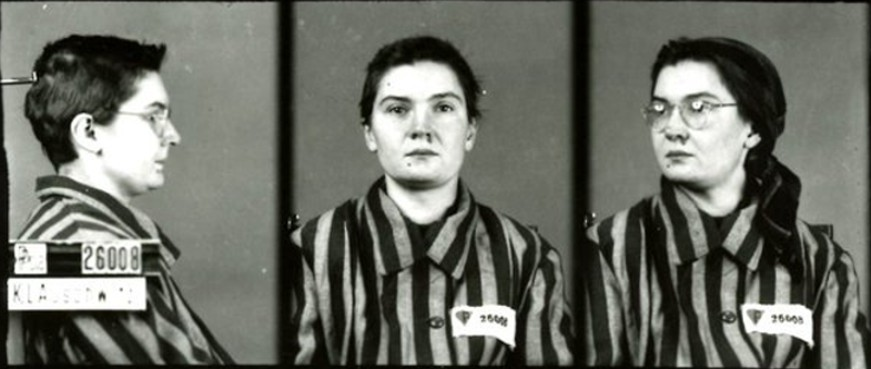
Anna Smoleńska as a prisoner of Auschwitz, in 1942

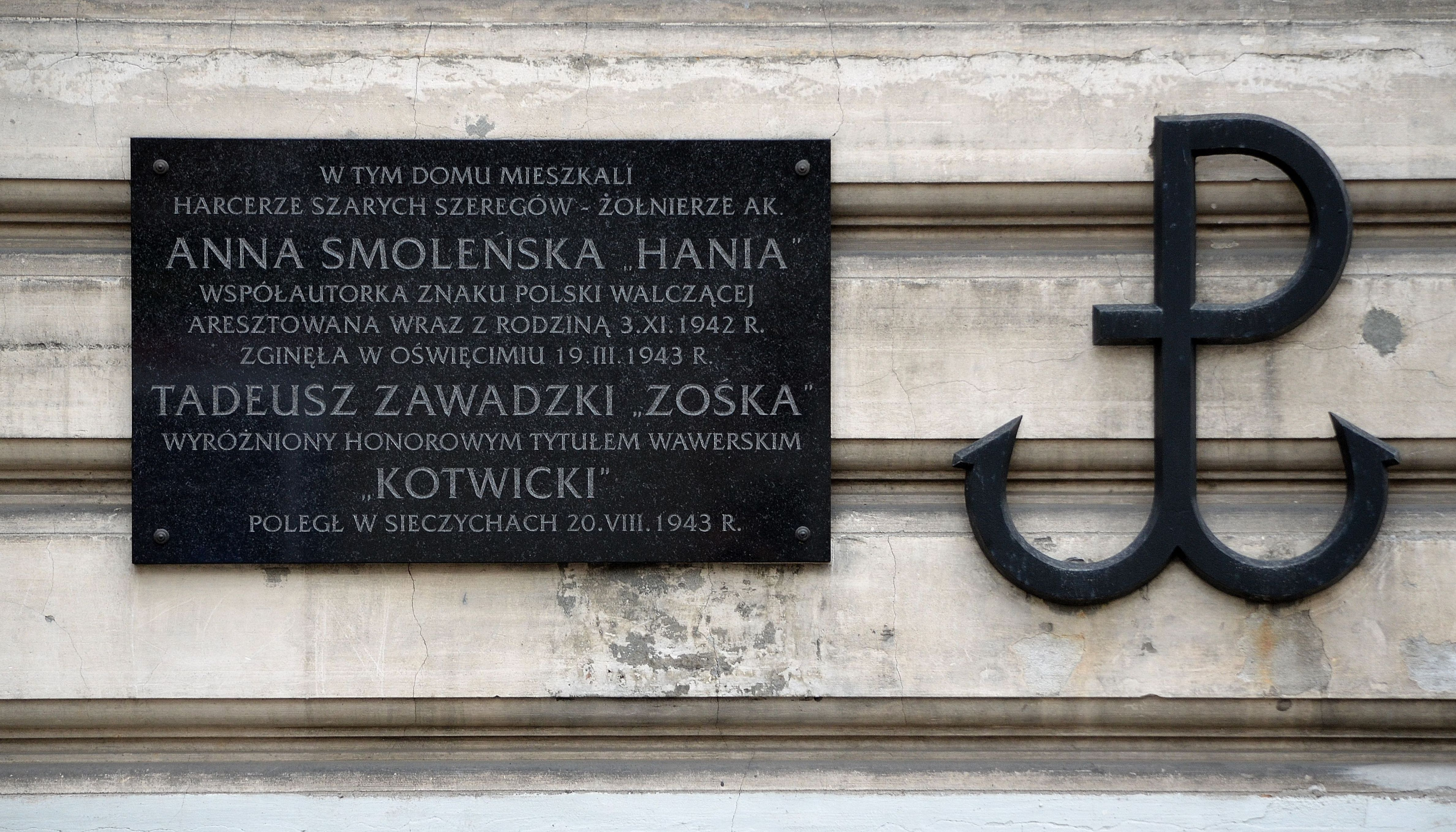
A memorial plaque at the House of Professors of the Warsaw University of Technology at Koszykowa Street 75, where Anna Smoleńska lived together with her family.

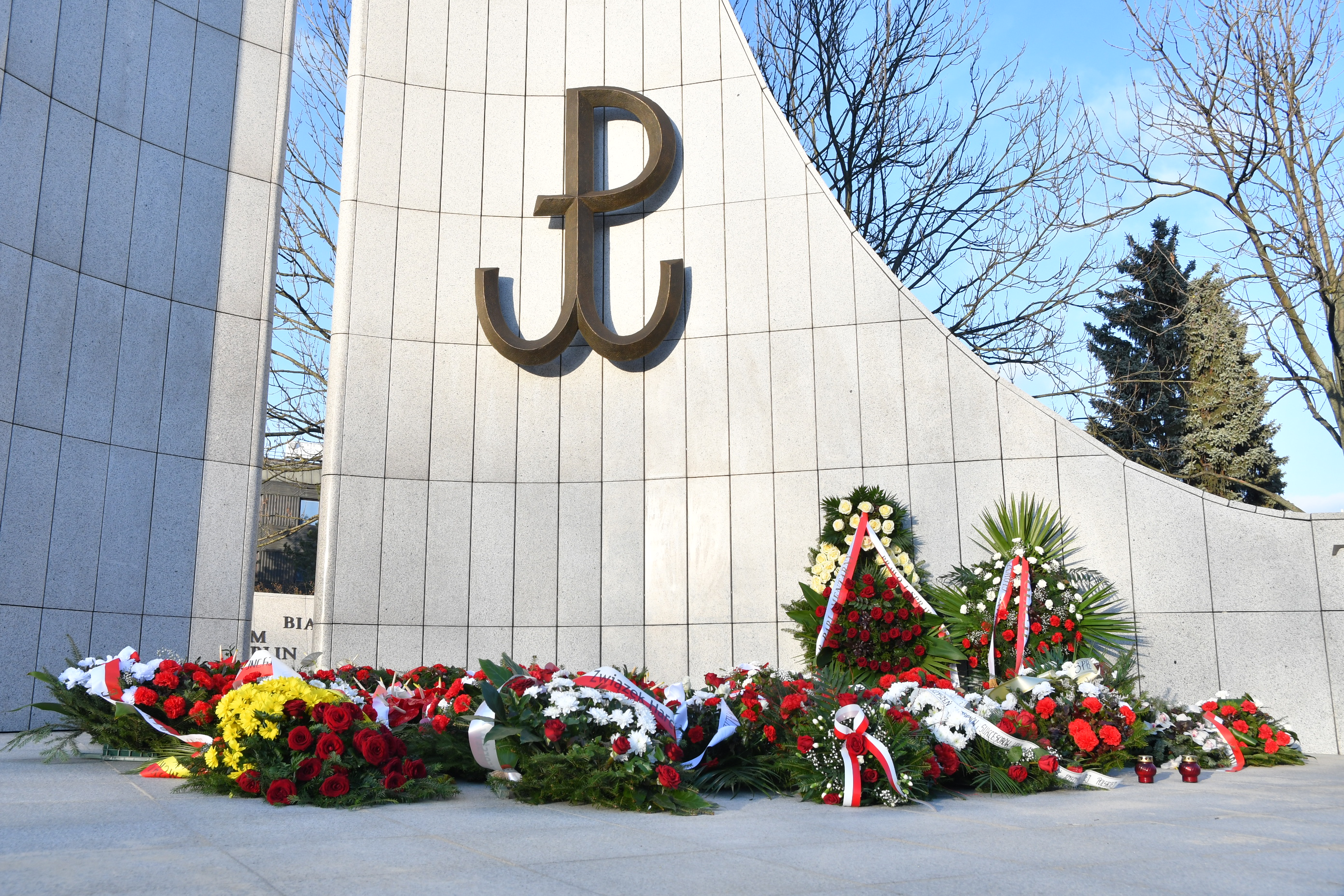
Kotwica symbol of the Polish Underground State and Home Army, on the Monument to the Polish Underground State and Home Army

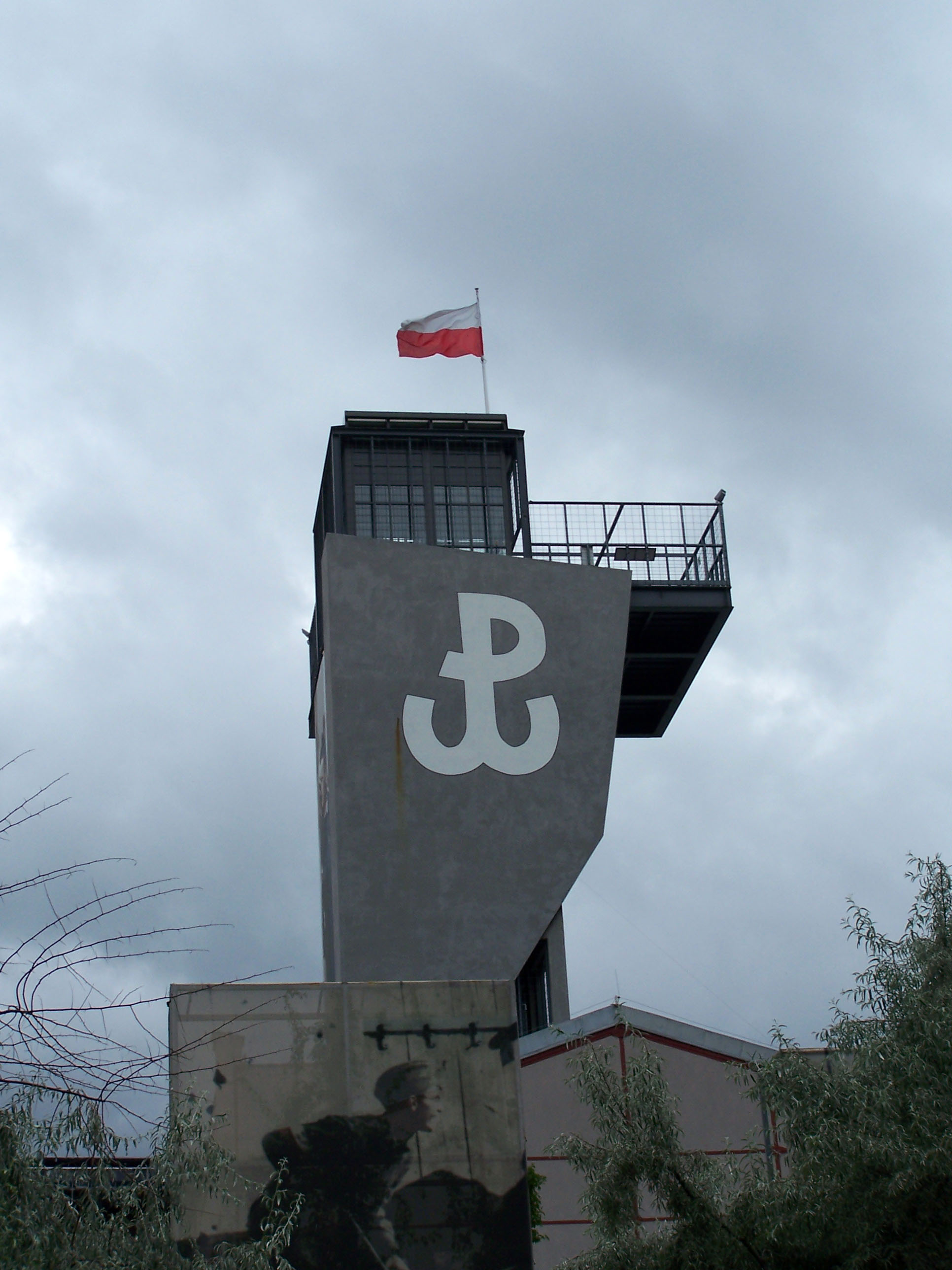
Symbol of Fighting Poland during World War II on the Warsaw Uprising Museum

Anna Smoleńska (Polish pronunciation: [anna smɔlɛɲska]; February 28, 1920 in Warsaw – March 19, 1943 in Auschwitz-Birkenau), pseudonym Hania, was a Polish student of art history at the University of Warsaw, author of the symbol of Fighting Poland during World War II and girl scout of the Grey Ranks.

== Life ==
She was the daughter of Kazimierz Smoleński, a professor of chemistry at the Warsaw University of Technology. The Smoleński family lived in the so-called House of Professors, which is part of the University of Technology's building complex at Koszykowa street 75.

In 1938 she graduated from the Juliusz Słowacki Junior High School in Warsaw. She began studying art history at the Faculty of Humanities at the University of Warsaw. During the German occupation, she studied at the Municipal Horticultural and Agricultural School at Opaczewska Street in Warsaw, where secret education was conducted in Polish. She completed a conspiracy communications course, and was a participant in the Wawer unit participating in Minor sabotage. She looked after the families of the arrested and provided them with secret messages from the Nazi Pawiak prison. She belonged to "Kuźnica Harcerska".

In 1942 she was a liaison at the Propaganda Department of the Bureau of Information and Propaganda (BIP) of the General Headquarters of the Union of Armed Struggle - the Home Army (ZWZ-AK). In 1942 she won the competition of the Bureau of Information and Propaganda for the sign of the Polish Underground State - anchor project - the symbol of Fighting Poland.

== Arrest ==
She was the liaison of Maria Straszewska, the editorial secretary of the Biuletyn Informacyjny. The Germans tried to arrest the editor-in-chief of the Biuletyn Informacyjny Aleksander Kamiński and the editorial secretary Maria Straszewska, but failed. However, on November 3, 1942, the Gestapo arrested Anna Smoleńska, her parents, sister and brother with his wife.

== Death at Auschwitz ==
After being imprisoned in Pawiak, she did not give anyone away, despite the heavy investigation. Smoleńska was later taken from Pawiak on November 26, 1942, to Auschwitz concentration camp, where she was given camp number 26008. She died of typhus, and three of her family members were killed in Auschwitz. Her father, after a hard investigation, was shot by the Gestapo in the ruins of the ghetto on May 7, 1943.

== Commemoration ==
In 1998, a commemorative plaque was unveiled, dedicated to the scouts: Anna Smoleńska and Tadeusz Zawadzki. The plaque was placed on the side wall of the House of Professors of the Warsaw University of Technology at Koszykowa 75 street in Warsaw.

== See also ==
- Anna Maria Hinel
- Krystyna Krahelska
- Jan Bytnar
- Maciej Aleksy Dawidowski
- Andrzej Romocki
- Jan Rodowicz
- Krzysztof Kamil Baczyński
- Józef Szczepański
- Tadeusz Zawadzki
- Sonderaktion Krakau
- German AB-Aktion in Poland
- Intelligenzaktion
- List of Poles
- Nazi crimes against the Polish nation
- Wola massacre
- Wawer massacre
- War crimes in occupied Poland during World War II
- World War II casualties of Poland

== Bibliography ==
- Konarski, Stanisław (1999–2000). Smoleńska Anna. Polski Słownik Biograficzny tom XXXIX [Anna Smolenska. Polish Biographical Dictionary volume XXXIX] (in Polish). Warszawa-Kraków-Wrocław-Gdańsk., pp. 257–258.
- Konarski, Stanisław. "Anna Smoleńska" [Anna Smolenska] (in Polish). Archived from the original on 4 June 2020.
- Michalska, Hanna (1988). Słownik uczestniczek walki o niepodległość Polski 1939-1945. Poległe i zmarłe w okresie okupacji niemieckiej [Dictionary of participants of the Polish struggle for independence 1939-1945. Fallen and died during the German occupation] (in Polish). Warsaw: Państwowy Instytut Wydawniczy. ISBN 83-06-01195-3.
