= Dreszer Park =

Urban park in Warsaw, Poland

General Gustaw Orlicz-Dreszer Park
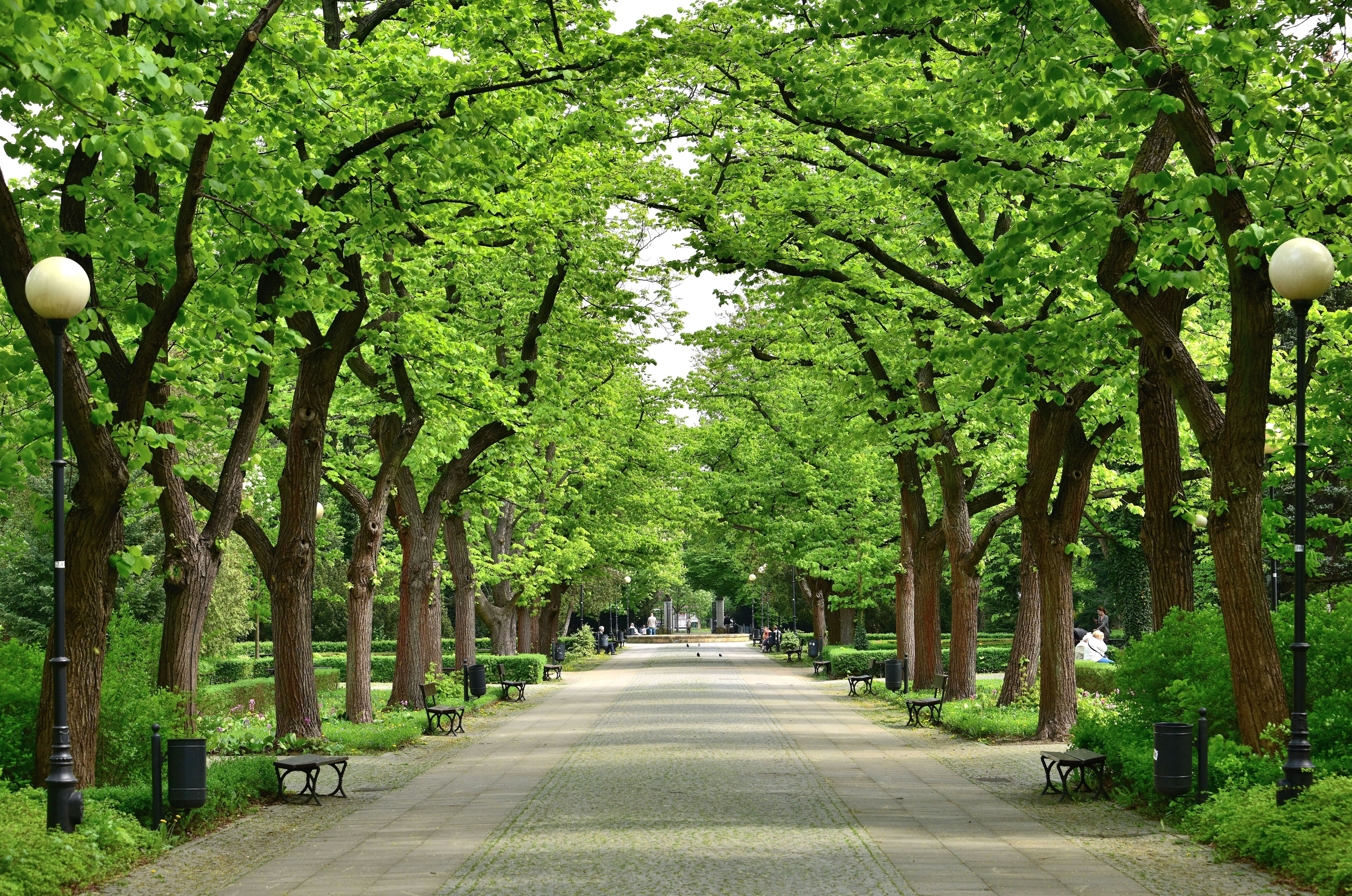
- The main avenue of the Dreszer Park in 2018.
- Interactive map of General Gustaw Orlicz-Dreszer Park
- Type: Urban park
- Location: Warsaw, Poland
- Coordinates: 52°11′51″N 21°01′16″E
- Area: 27,000 m² (290,626 sq ft.)
- Created: 1938
- Designer: Zygmunt Hellwig

The General Gustaw Orlicz-Dreszer Park, (Note: Polish: Park gen. Gustawa Orlicz-Dreszera) also simply known as Dreszer Park, (Note: Polish pronunciation: [ˈdrɛ.ʂɛr]; Polish: Park Dreszera) is an urban park in the city of Warsaw, Poland, in the district of Mokotów. It is located between Ursynowska Street, Puławska Street, Odyńca Street, and Krasickiego Street. The park was designed by Zygmunt Hellwig, and opened in 1938.

== Name ==
The urban park is named General Gustaw Orlicz-Dreszer Park (Polish: Park gen. Gustawa Orlicz-Dreszera), commonly shortened to as Dreszer Park (Polish: Park Dreszera). It is named after Gustaw Orlicz-Dreszer (1889−1936), a military officer, who had served in the Polish Legions, and later, in the Polish Armed Forces. He died in 1936 in a plane crash, two years before the park was opened in 1938.

From 1951 to 2012, it was officially known as Mokotów Park (Polish: Park Mokotowski), being named after the city district of Mokotów, in which it is located. The local population kept referring to it by its previous name. In March 2012, the name was reverted.

The name of the park in Polish, Park gen. Gustawa Orlicz-Dreszera (General Gustaw Orlicz-Dreszer Park), is incorrect in accordance with the rules of Polish grammar. The surname Orlicz-Dreszer, present in the name, is incorrectly declined as Orlicz-Dreszera, while it should be declined as Orlicza-Dreszera. In 2019, the Warsaw City Council decided against changing the name to the version with proper declination.

== History ==
The Dreszer Park was opened on 26 June 1938. It was designed by Zygmunt Hellwig in the modernist style, and partially built in place of the rampart of the former Fort M-Che. In the opening ceremony participated Stefan Starzyński, the mayor of Warsaw, and high-ranking officers of the Polish Armed Forces. The park was located between current Ursynowska Street, Independence Avenue, Odyńca Street, and Krasickiego Street.'

In 1944, during the Second World War, the park became a defensive point of the Polish resistance fighters of the Warsaw Uprising, mainly from the Baszta Regiment Group, who defended their position from German forces attacking from the north between 2 and 13 August 1944, and from the south, between 25 and 27 September 1944. During the war the park was used as a provisional cemetery, both for the fallen Polish resistance fighters and the civilian casualties. After the end of the conflict, the bodies were exhumated and relocated to the proper cemeteries.

The park was restored and reopened in 1951. The western portion of the park, located between Ursynowska Street, Odyńca Street, Krasickiego Street, and Independence Avenue, was separated from the rest, forming the Second Jordan Garden, one of the Jordan gardens in the city, which form urban green spaces dedicated as the recreational and play area for youth.

In 1983, the park was given the status of a cultural property.

In 1985, in the park was unveiled the Monument of Fighting Mokotów of 1944, designed by Eugeniusz Ajewski. It is dedicated to Polish resistance fighters, mainly from the Baszta Regiment Group, who had fought in the park in 1944 during the Warsaw Uprising.

In 2007, the entirety of the soil in the park was revegetated. During the process, in the park was also built a fountain, children's playground, and public toilets, lighting was installed, and a fence was built around the park.

== Characteristics ==
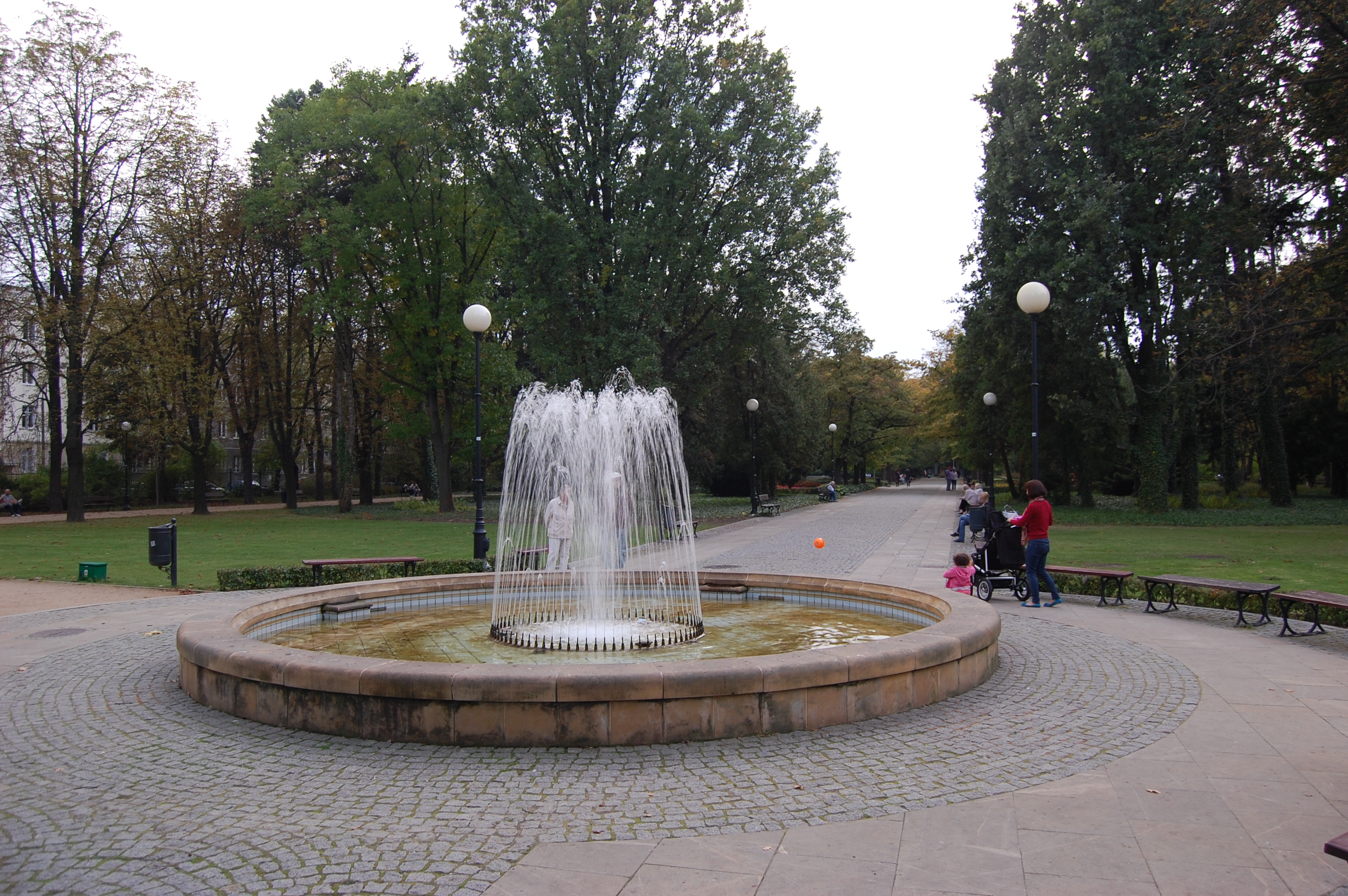
A fountain in the Dreszer Park, in 2012.

The Dreszer Park is located in the city of Warsaw, Poland, in the district of Mokotów, in the City Information System area of Wierzbno. It is placed between Ursynowska Street, Puławska Street, Odyńca Street, and Krasickiego Street.

The park consists of a main avenue, and adjacent pathways, with trees growing alongside them. It is one of the most popular parks in the city. The park has an area of 27,000 m^{2} (290,626 sq ft.).

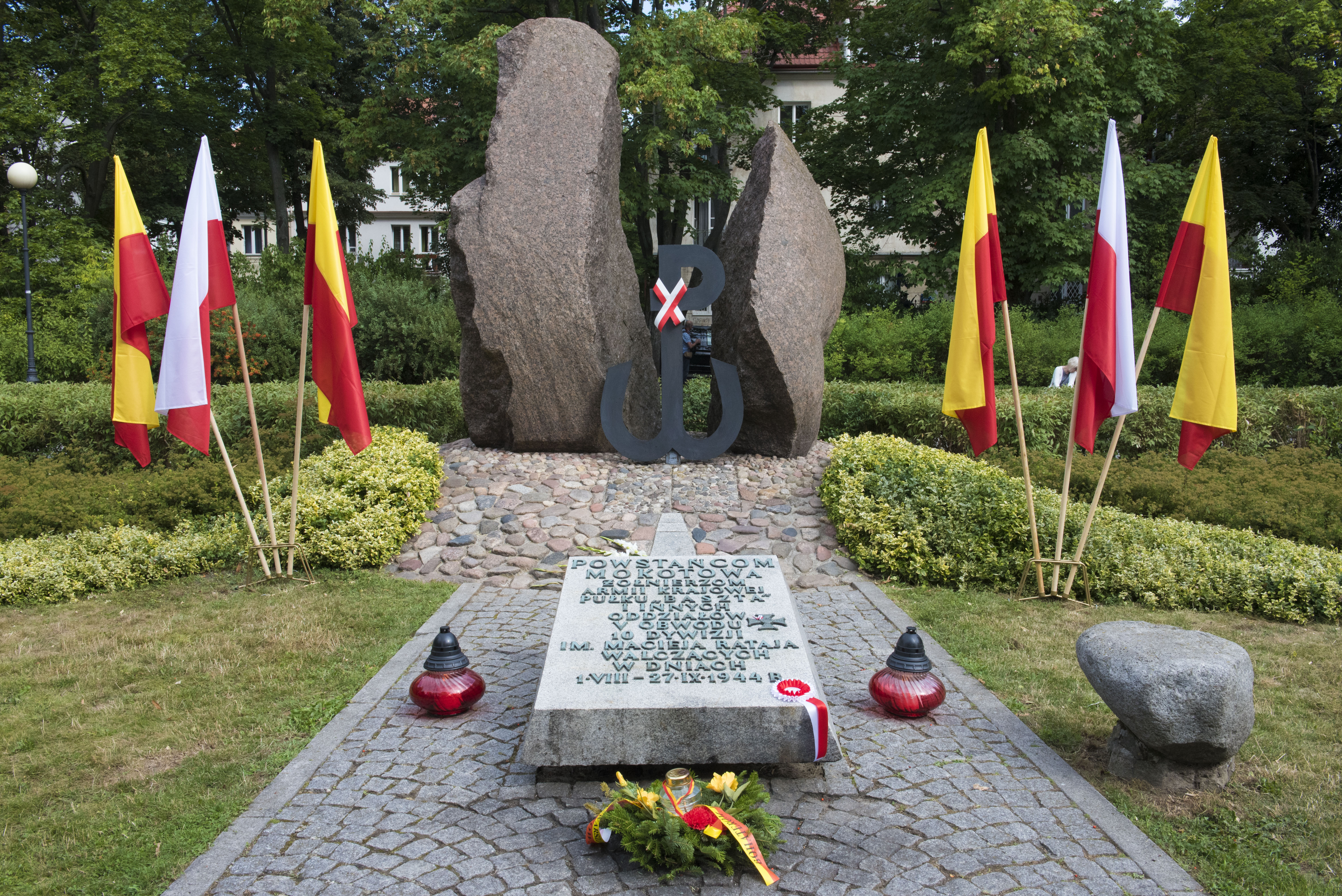
The Monument to the Fighting Mokotów of 1944 in Dreszer Park, in 2019.

In the park is located the Monument of Fighting Mokotów of 1944 (also known as the Monument of Mokotów Insurgents), dedicated to Polish resistance fighters, mainly from the Baszta Regiment Group, who fought in the park in 1944 during the Warsaw Uprising. The monument, designed by Eugeniusz Ajewski, and unveiled in 1985, consists of a glacial erratic rock broken into two parts, with a sculpture of the Kotwica, which, during the Second World War, served as the emblem of the Polish Underground State, and the Home Army. It is a ligature of the letters P and W, symbolizing term Polska Walcząca, which in Polish, means Fighting Poland. In front of the sculpture is placed a plaque with a text commemorating the fighters. In front of the monument are held annual commemorative celebrations.

Next to the park, between Ursynowska Street, Odyńca Street, Krasickiego Street, and Independence Avenue, is located the Second Jordan Garden (Polish: II Ogród Jordański), one of the Jordan gardens in the city, which form urban green spaces dedicated as the recreational and play area for children and youth. It is located between Ursynowska Street, Odyńca Street, Krasickiego Street, and Independence Avenue.
