= Fort M-Che =

Former fort in Warsaw, Poland

- Warsaw in Poland
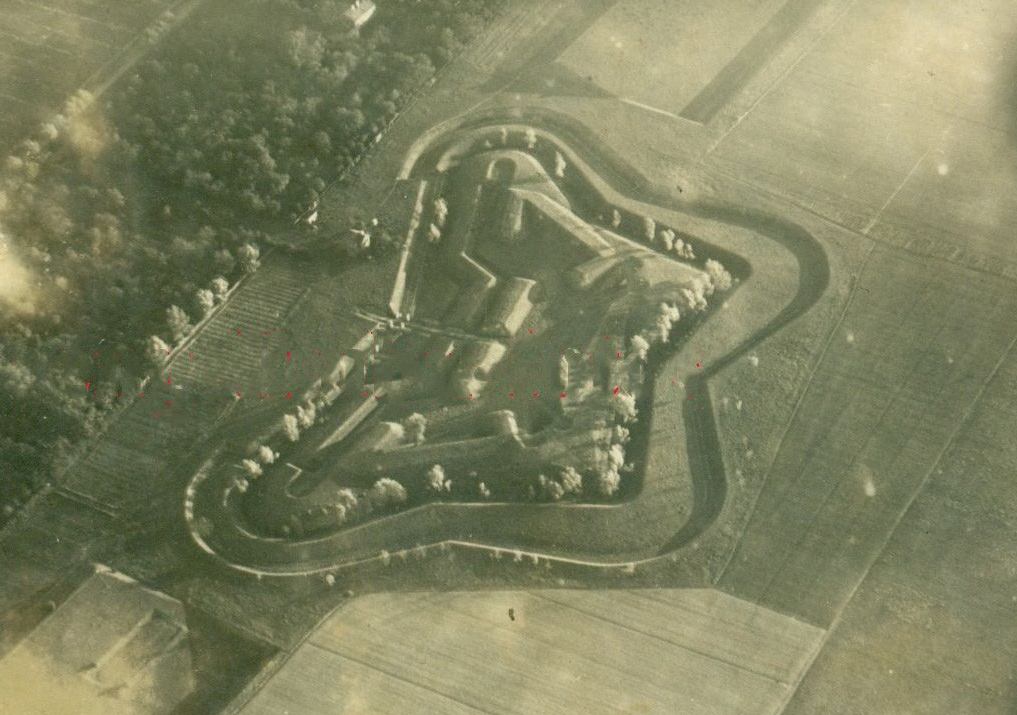
- The Fort M-Che in 1915.

Site information
- Type: Fort
- Condition: deconstructed

Location
- Coordinates: 52°11′51″N 21°01′20″E

Site history
- Built: 1892
- Built by: Imperial Russian Army
- In use: 1892–1909

Garrison information
- Designations: M-Ch; M-Che; M-Cze; M-Tsche

The Fort M-Che, (Note: Polish: Fort M-Cze; Russian: Форт М-Ч, transliteration: Fort M-Ch; German: Fort M-Tsche) also known as Fort Mokotów-Czerniaków, (Note: Russian: Форт Мокотув-Чернякув, transliteration: Fort Mokotuv-Chernyakuv) and Fort Odyńca, was a fort which was a part of the inner circle of the series of fortifications of the Warsaw Fortress. It was built in 1892 by the Imperial Russian Army, in what is now the neighborhood of Wierzbno, in the city of Warsaw, Poland, located near current Czeczota Street and Odyńca Street. It was demilitarized and abandoned in 1909, and deconstructed in the 1920s.

== History ==
The Fort M-Che (abbreviation for Mokotów-Czerniaków) was built in 1892 near the village of Wierzbno, as part of the inner circle of the series of fortifications of the Warsaw Fortress, build around Warsaw by the Imperial Russian Army. Around the fort was built Czeczota Street. In 1909, it was decided to decommission and demolish the fortifications of the Warsaw Fortress, due to the high costs of their maintenance, and as such the M-Che was demilitarized and abandoned. After 1921, the fort begun being known as Fort Odyńca, after the nearby Odyńca Street. The fort was deconstructed in the 1920s. The portion of its rampart was flattened and became part of the Dreszer Park.
