= Smolensky (surname) =

Smolensky, feminine: Smolenskaya, is a Russian-language toponymic surname literally meaning "from/of Smolensk". The corresponding Polish-language surnames are Smoleński and Smoleńska.

Notable people with this surname include:

- Alexander Smolensky (1954–2024), Russian banker
- Nikolay Smolensky (born 1980), Russian banker
- Paul Smolensky (born 1955), American cognitive scientist
- Stepan Smolensky (1848–1909), Russian choir director

== See also ==
- Smolenski
- Konstantinos Smolenskis, Greek military officer
