= Nowy Kurier Warszawski =

Former Polish language newspaper

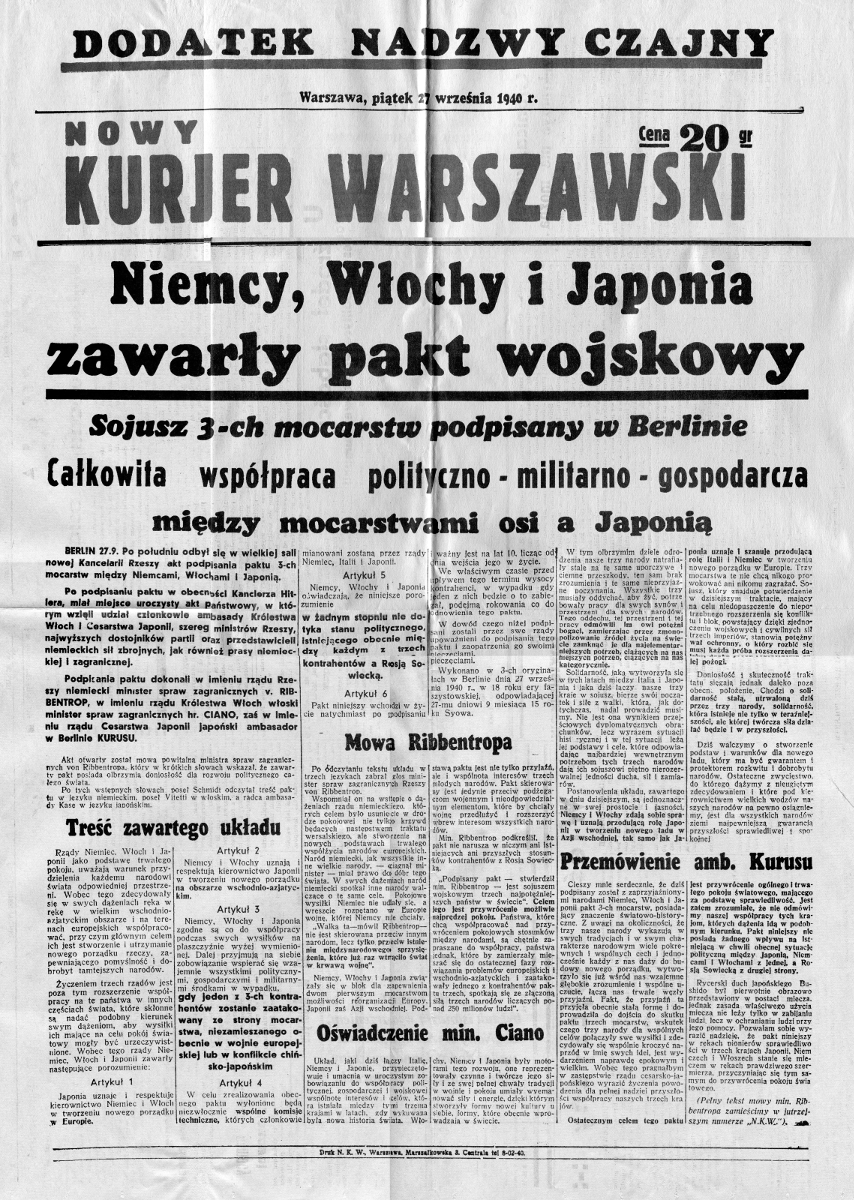
- Front page of Nowy Kurjer Warszawski on 27 September 1940 announcing the signing of the Tripartite Pact
- Type: Daily newspaper
- Format: Broadsheet
- Editor: "Franciszek Sowiński"
- Founded: 1939 (87 years ago)
- Ceased publication: 1945 (81 years ago)
- Language: Polish
- Headquarters: Marszałkowska 3/5; Warsaw, General Gouvernement
- Price: 0.2, later 0.25 Polish złoty
- OCLC number: 12296224

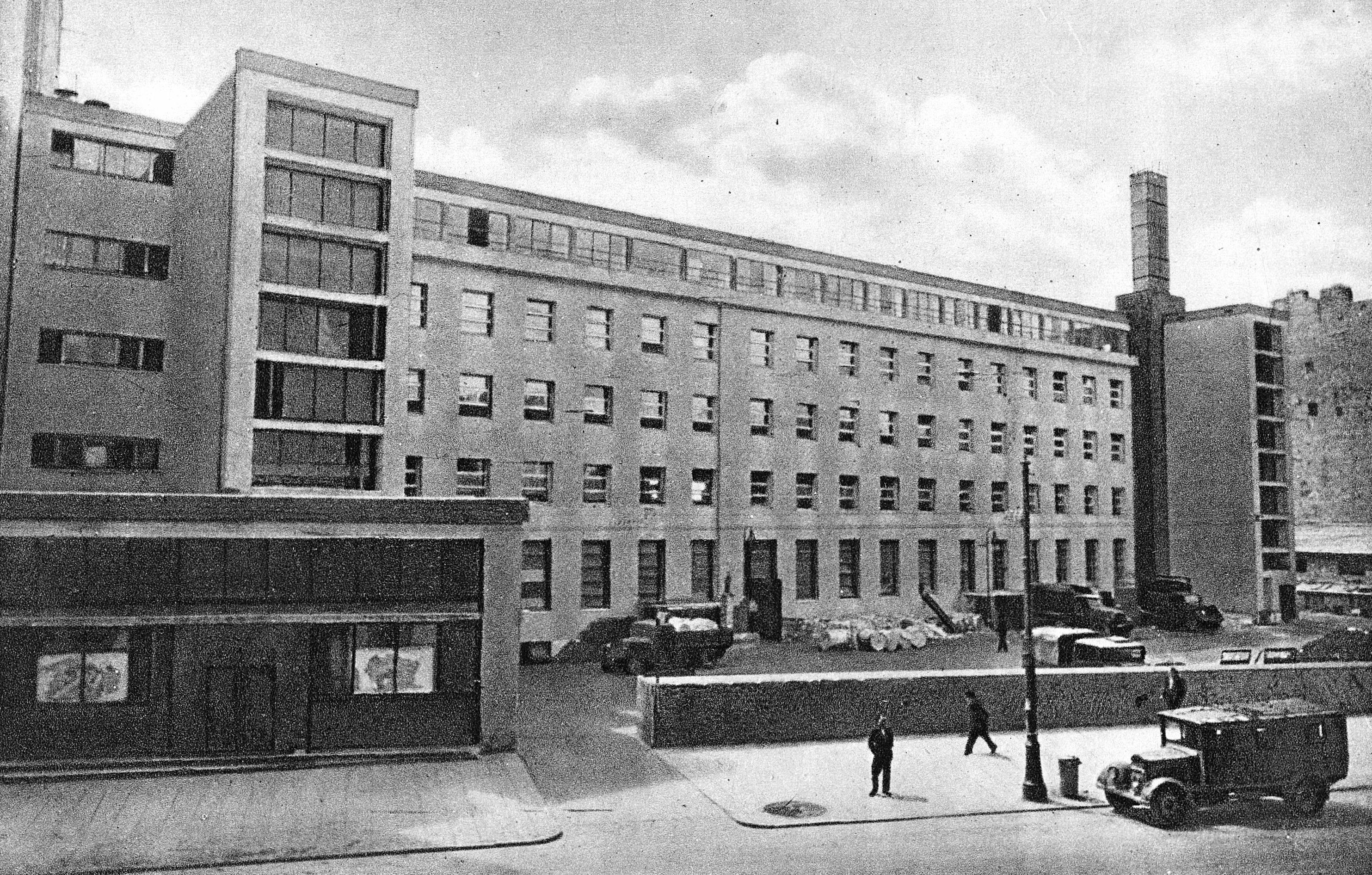
Dom Prasy building at 3/5 Marszałkowska Street in Warsaw, in 1939−1944 the seat of Nowy Kurier Warszawski

Nowy Kurier Warszawski, initially Nowy Kurjer Warszawski ("New Courier of Warsaw") was a German propaganda newspaper issued in the occupied Poland during World War II. Its name was coined after a popular pre-war newspaper Kurier Warszawski, with which it had nothing to do but the name. According to German sources the newspaper was issued in 200 000 copies daily, but it was commonly boycotted by the Poles (often defaced with the kotwica) and the numbers seem to be much overestimated.

== History ==
Following the Polish defeat against the joint Nazi German and Soviet invasion of Poland of 1939, on 6 October German and Soviet forces gained full control over Poland. The success of the invasion marked the end of the Second Polish Republic, though Poland never formally surrendered. On 8 October, after an initial period of military administration, Germany directly annexed western Poland and the former Free City of Danzig and placed the remaining block of territory under the administration of the newly established General Government.

Within the General Government, all Polish newspapers were immediately banned. In their stead, the German authorities established eight Polish-language daily newspapers as part of their propaganda machine aimed at subjugated nations. The largest of them was the Warsaw-based Nowy Kurier Warszawski with daily circulation of over 200,000 copies. By comparison, it is estimated that all German-published journals in occupied Poland had a circulation of 700,000 in 1941 and over 1 million in 1944.

The new newspaper drew its name from pre-war Kurier Warszawski, established in 1821 and highly popular in pre-war Warsaw. However, the "New Courier" had little to do with the original journal apart from the name and the printing press (in the former Dom Prasy building). The profile of the newspaper was akin to modern tabloid journalism. Apart from front line news, propaganda and overly optimistic reports on constant successes of the German Wehrmacht, the newspaper featured a collection of sensational crime stories, astrology, gossip columns and such. As such, the newspaper was primarily a tool of indoctrination, primarily of less-educated strata of Polish society.

Because of that it was commonly referred to by a variety of derogatory names. The most popular name, gadzinówka (Polish for "Reptile [newspaper]") became a generic term for any foreign propaganda publication in standard Polish language. Other popular nicknames include Kurwar (abbreviation of the title, but also a pun on the Polish word "kurwa" – whore) and "szmatławiec" (Rag-journal).

Despite its clear propaganda flavour, the newspaper remained highly popular in Poland, as it included useful information on new regulations introduced by the Germans and actual info on monthly food rations as well as many ads and obituaries. In addition, it was cheap: each issue was priced at only 20 groszes (later 25), an average price for a newspaper in pre-war Poland, but very inexpensive in reality of rampant hyperinflation in war-torn Poland.

Following the outbreak of the Warsaw Uprising of 1944, the headquarters of the newspaper was moved to Łódź, where it continued to circulate until January 1945. After the war at least 15 former employees of the New Warsaw Courier had been tried and sentenced to prison for their collaboration with the Nazis during the war.

== See also ==
- Biuletyn Informacyjny
