= Kurjer Warszawski =

Former newspaper in Poland

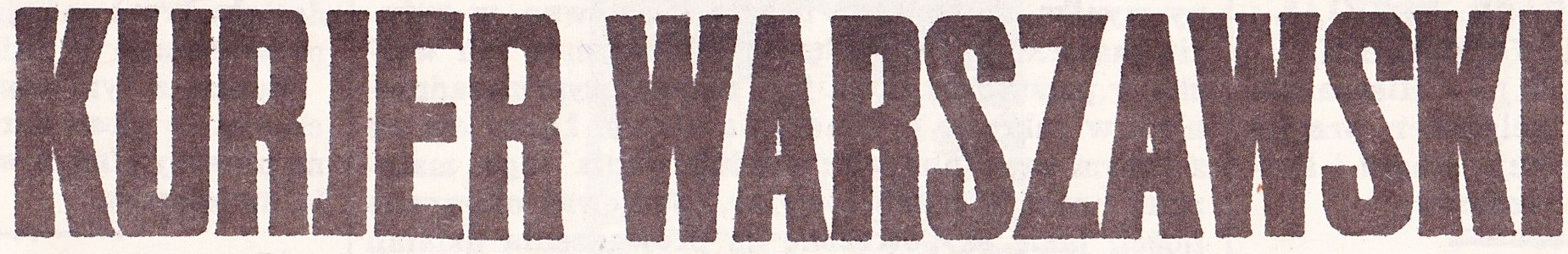

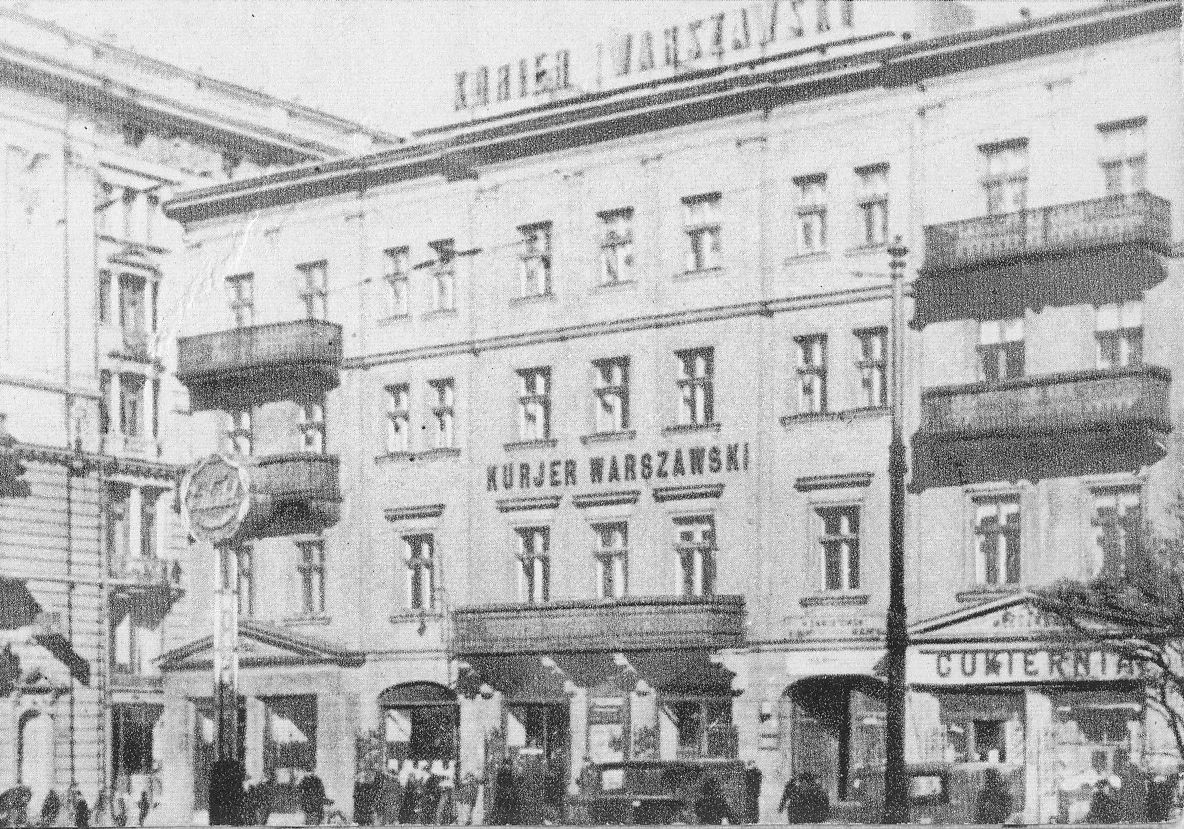
- The newspaper's editorial office in Krakowskie Przedmieście
- Type: Daily
- Founder: Bruno Kiciński
- Founded: 1821
- Ceased publication: 1939
- Political alignment: Christain democratic association with SChN (after 1918)
- Language: Polish
- City: Warsaw
- Country: Congress Poland; Government General of Warsaw; Second Polish Republic
- Circulation: 20,000 (as of 1883)
- OCLC number: 833874823

The Kurjer Warszawski Polish pronunciation: [ˈku.rjɛr varˈʂaf.ski] was a daily newspaper printed in Warsaw, Poland, from 1821 to 1939, with two editions daily from 1873. It was selling 4,000 copies in 1868, and over 20,000 copies after 1883.

== See also ==
- Nowy Kurier Warszawski
