= Monument to the Polish Underground State and Home Army =

- Pomnik Polskiego Państwa Podziemnego i Armii Krajowej
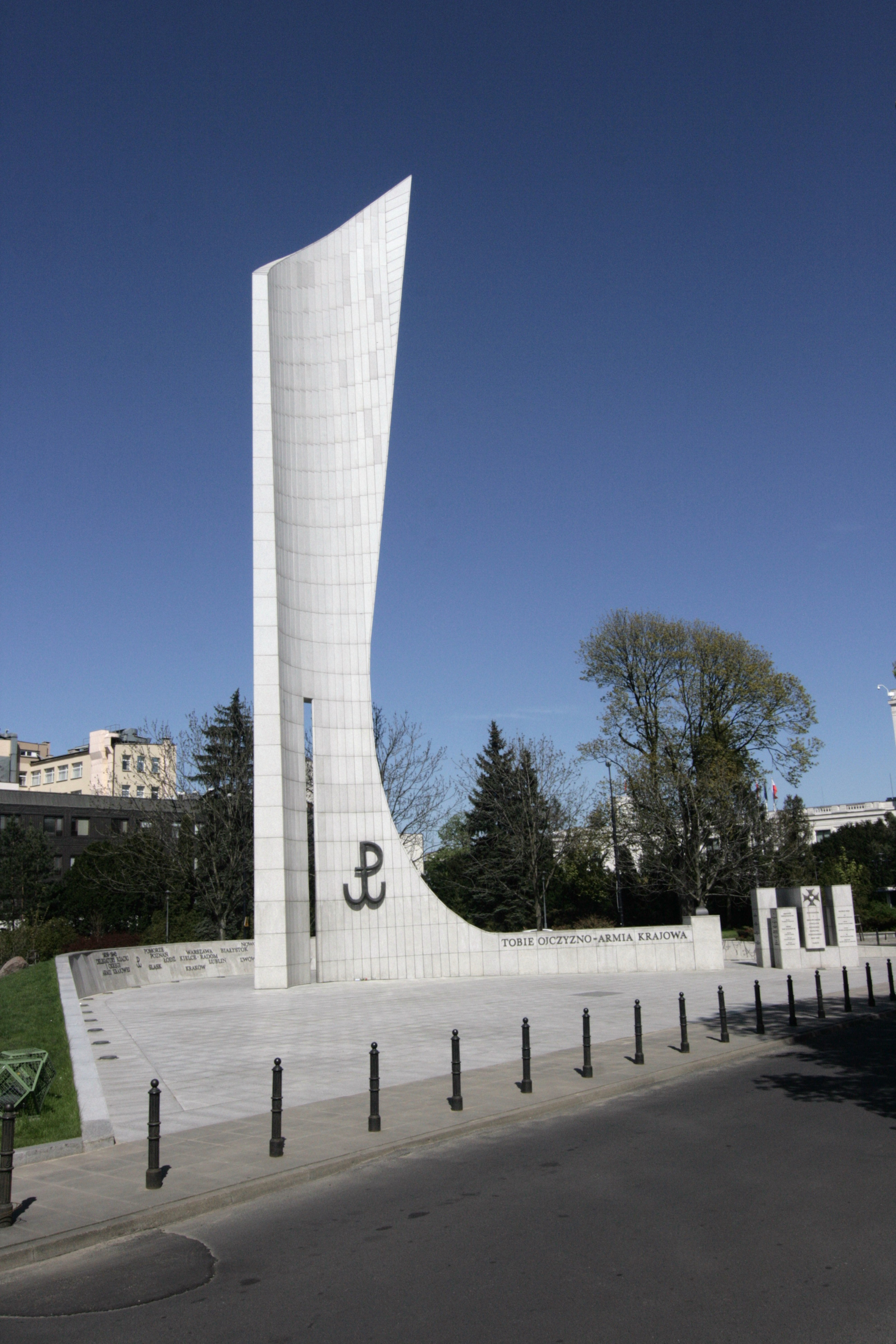
- View of the Monument to the Polish Underground State and Home Army from Jana Matejki Street
- Interactive map of Monument to the Polish Underground State and Home Army
- Location: Wiejska Street
- Coordinates: 52°13′30.5″N 21°01′35″E
- Designer: Jerzy Staniszkis
- Material: Polish granite
- Height: 32 m (105 ft)
- Beginning date: August 2, 1994
- Opening date: June 10, 1999
- Dedicated to: The Polish Underground State and Home Army

The Monument to the Polish Underground State and Home Army is located on Wiejska Street at the intersection with Jana Matejki Street opposite the Sejm, the Polish parliament.

== History ==
The Polish Underground State and Home Army were never given proper recognition in communist Poland because of the lack of independence and free public expression. After the fall of communism in Poland, the idea of building a worthy monument to the Home Army in Warsaw was established quickly in 1989.

The project for the monument was created as a result of two competitions announced by the Association of Polish Architects (Stowarzyszenie Architektów Polskich) in 1993 and 1997 at the request of the Committee of the Monument Building Mausoleum Army (Komitetu Budowy Pomnika Mauzoleum Armii Krajowej), which was established in 1990. After fundraising and choosing a location, the project was awarded to architect and graphic designer Jerzy Staniszkis.

The foundation stone was laid on August 2, 1994, and the unveiling took place on June 10, 1999. The ceremonial unveiling was made by the Speaker of the Sejm, Maciej Płażyński. The ceremony was preceded by Holy Mass celebrated by Polish Primate Cardinal Józef Glemp, and on June 11, the monument was dedicated by Pope John Paul II.

The monument is a place of celebration on the anniversary of the outbreak of the Warsaw Uprising and on Independence Day.

== Description ==
It is an abstract design which takes the form of an obelisk 32 meters high, which is topped with light gray Italian granite slabs. The memorial is made from Polish Strzegom granite. On it are placed the names of all the institutions and leaders of the Polish Underground.

== Interpretation ==
The monument is a tribute to all veterans of the Home Army and is a special gift of the Polish nation, which is a reminder of the ethos and the heroism of the people that made up the structure of the Polish Underground State and the need to incur the greatest sacrifices for the good of the country. "Monument (to the) Polish Underground State is a symbol of Polish statehood, the symbol of the Polish state from a time when it seemed that the Polish state was no longer" - said the then Speaker of Parliament during the celebration of the 66th anniversary of the Warsaw Uprising.

The location near the Parliament is supposed to symbolize the continuity of the Polish state whose most important institutions, despite the occupation, did not stop their activities for even one day. It also stresses the continuity of the ideals for which the Home Army fought.

Due to the fact that the monument is an abstract form, its interpretation may vary - a wing of a bird symbolizing eternal desired freedom, or the bastion of a fortress. The form of the monument was "derived from classical obelisk and, thanks to streamlined line architecture in this particular case is a traditional form of sculpture".

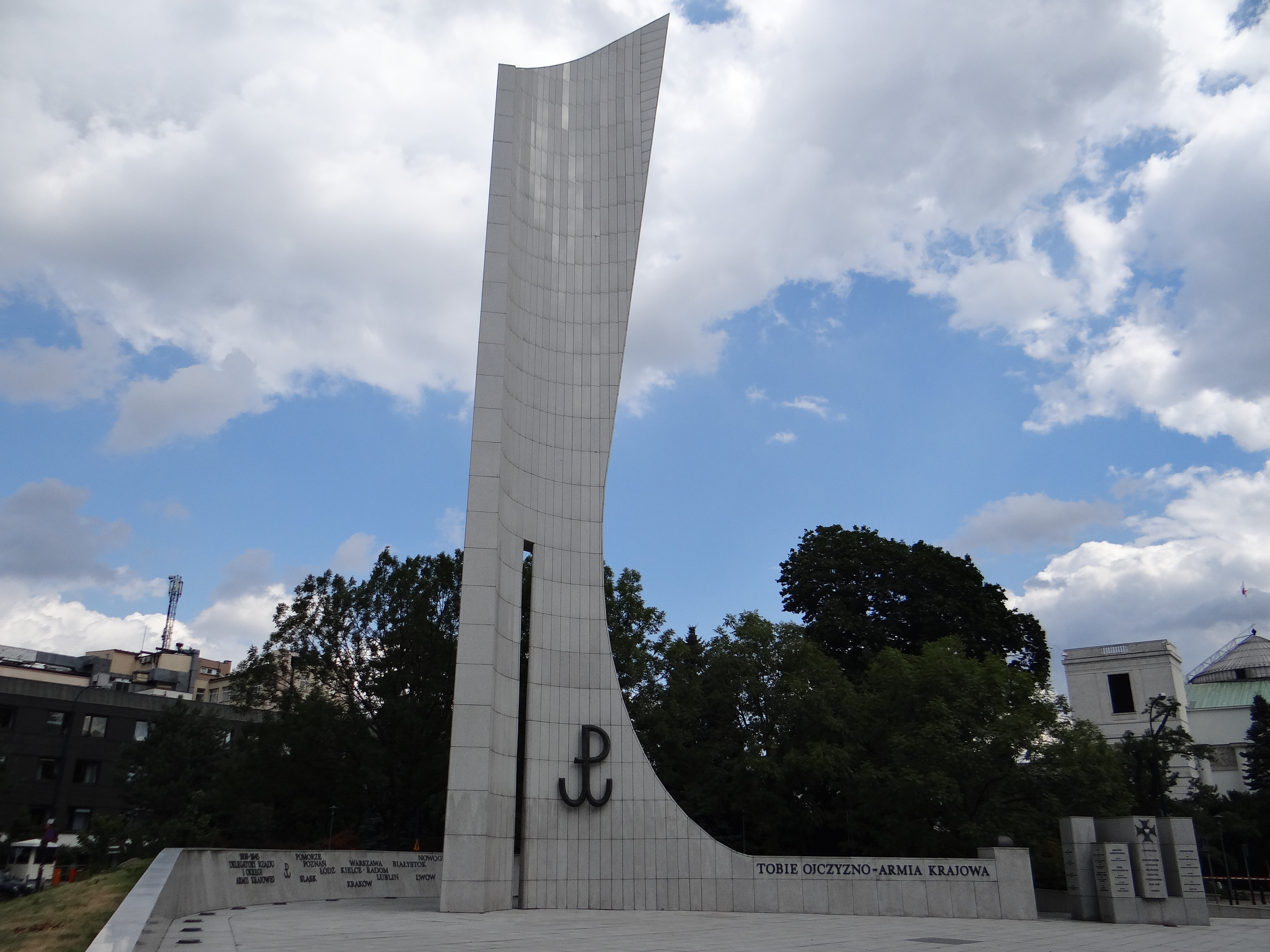
The monument in front of parliament

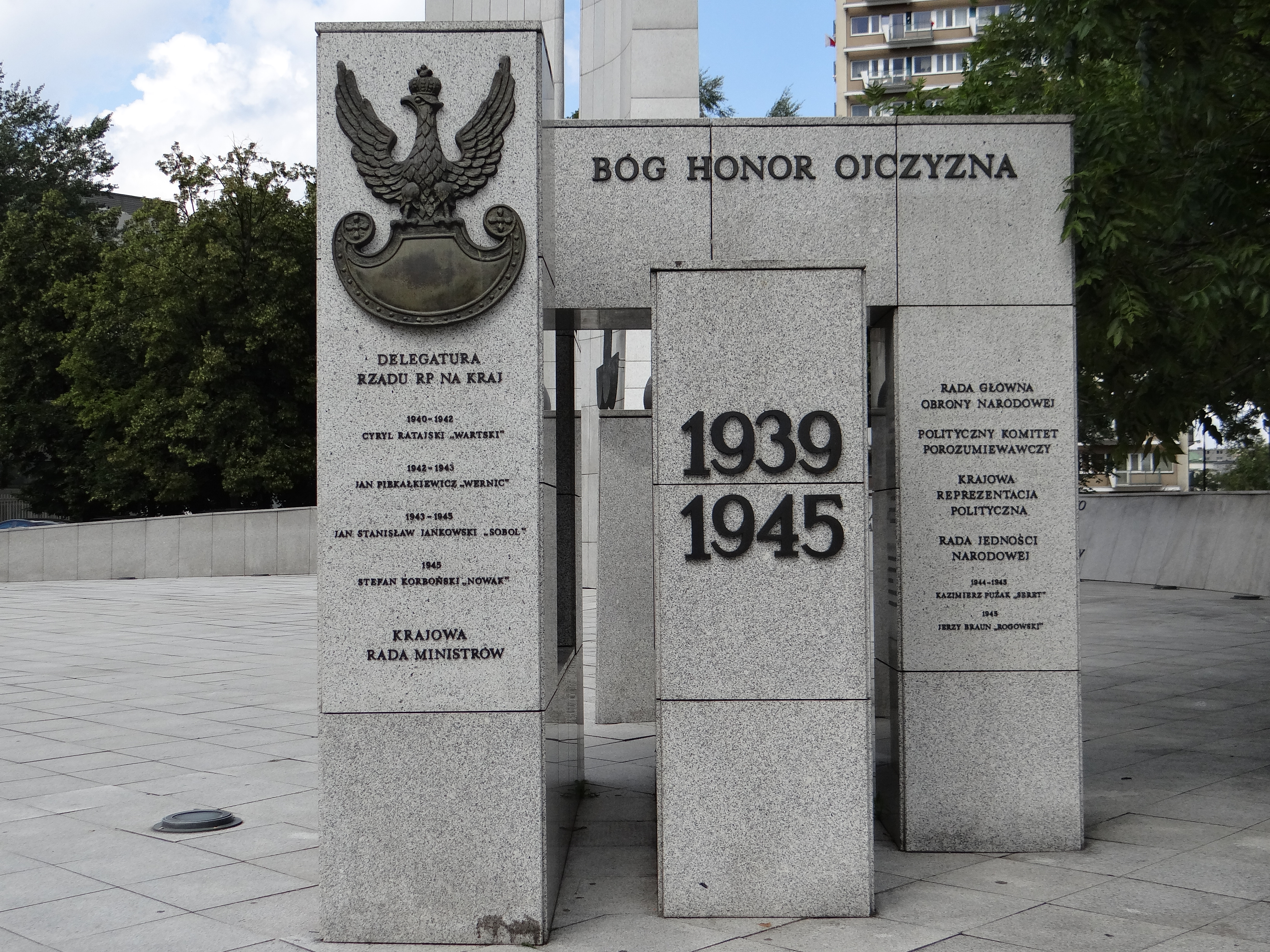
Detail of the monument

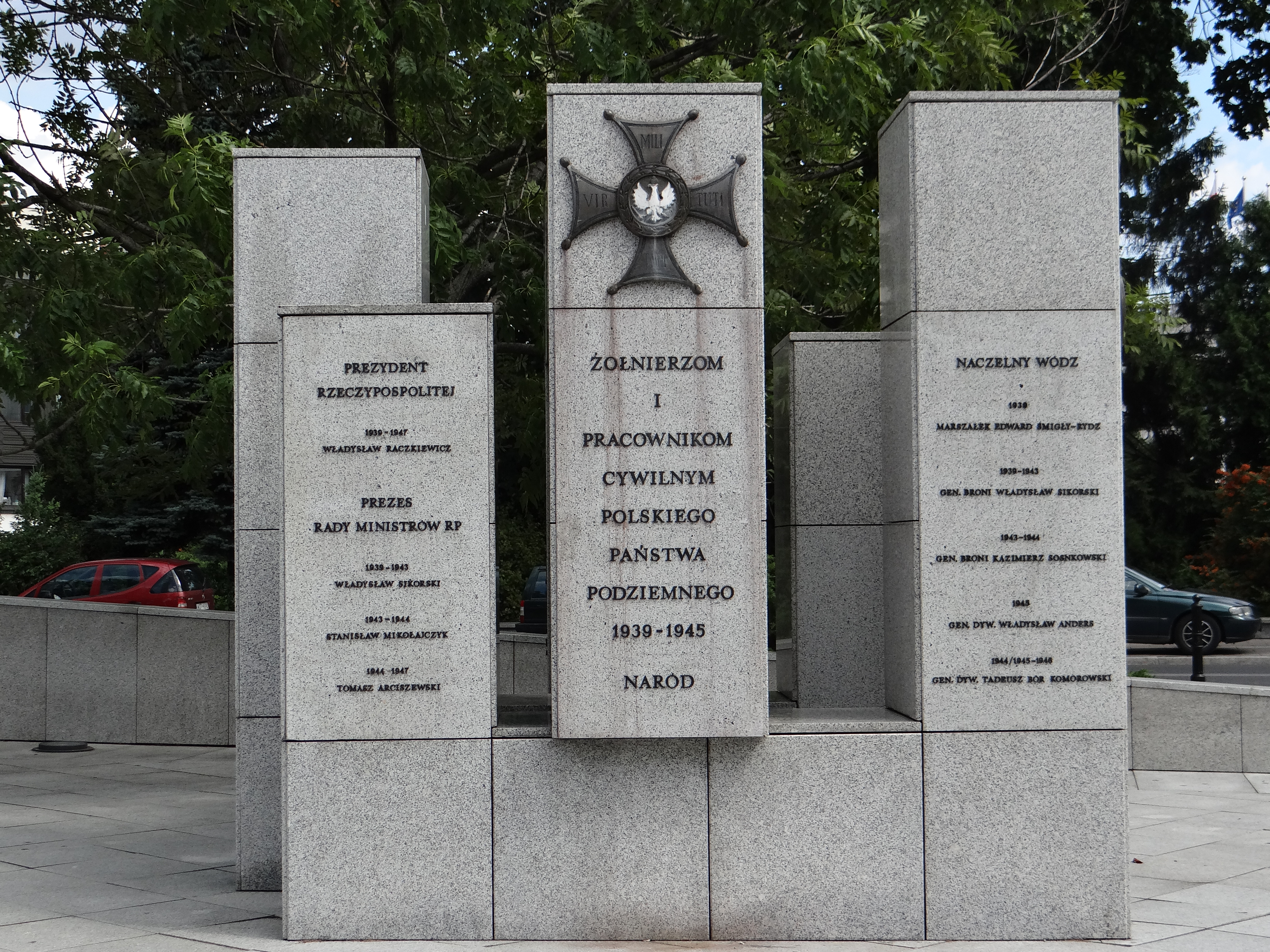
Detail of the monument

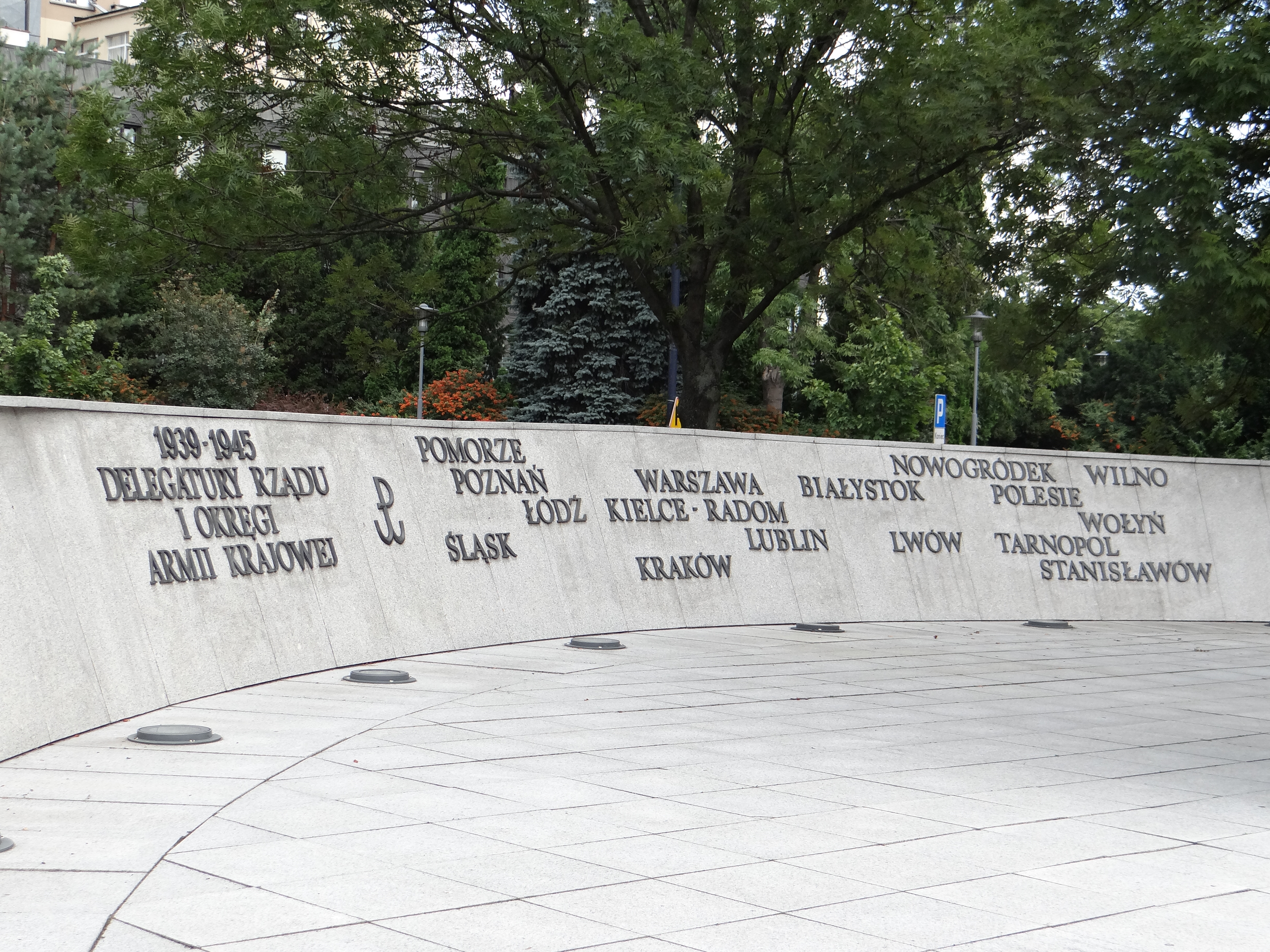
Detail of the monument
