= Smolno =

Smolno may refer to:

- Smolno, Greater Poland Voivodeship (west-central Poland)
- Smolno, Kuyavian-Pomeranian Voivodeship (north-central Poland)
- Smolno, Pomeranian Voivodeship (north Poland)
- Smolno, Warmian-Masurian Voivodeship (north Poland)
