= Tadeusz Samuel Smoleński =

Polish Egyptologist

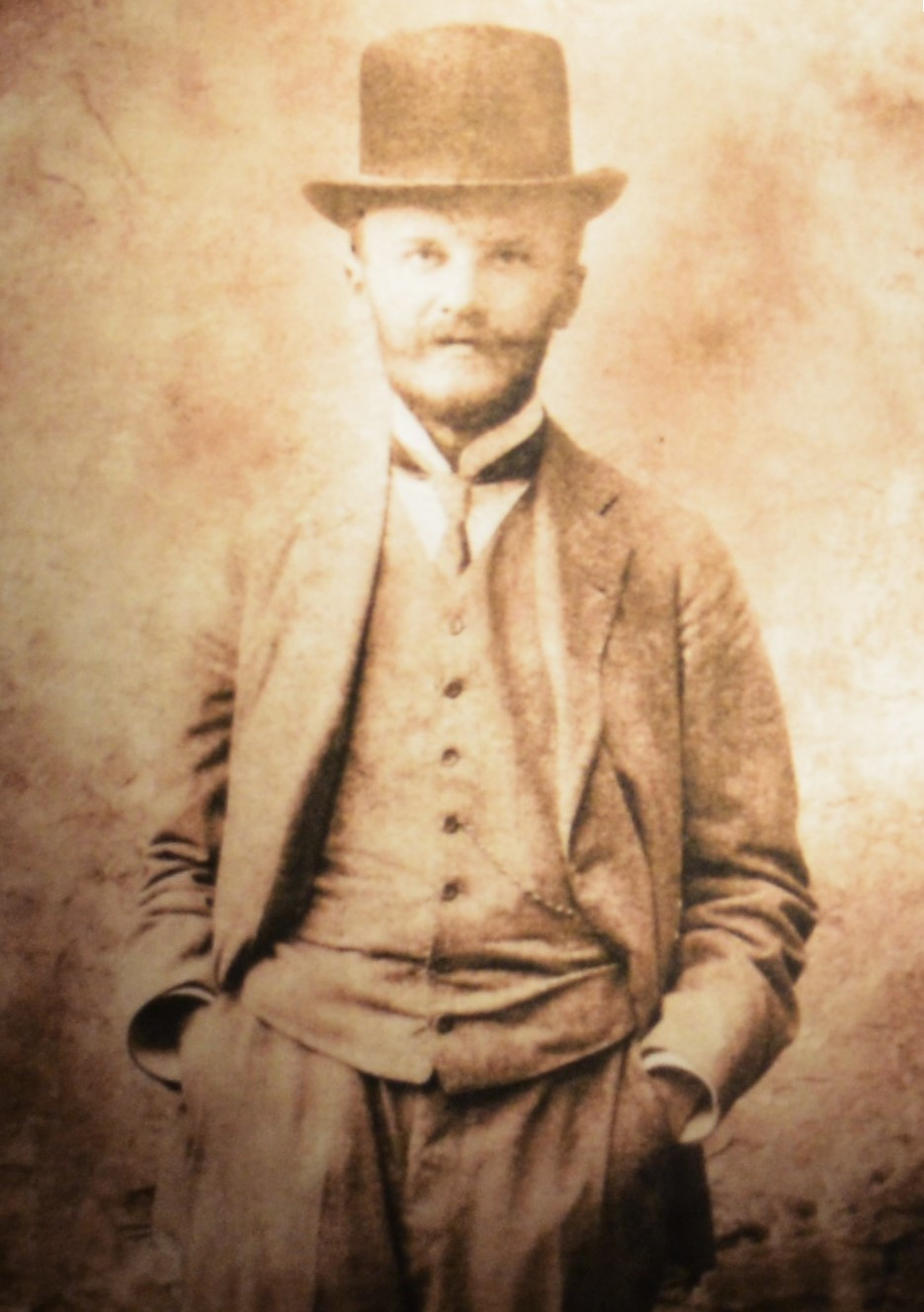
Image of Tadeusz Smoleński

Tadeusz Samuel Smoleński (1884–1909) was a Polish Egyptologist.

After research work on the history of Poland he was sent to Egypt for his health in 1905. In Egypt he learnt Arabic but after visiting the Cairo Museum and seeing the monuments he decided to make Egyptology his career.

Smoleński applied to Gaston Maspero and obtained a post in the library of the French Institute and studied Egyptian. He was later able to devote himself entirely to study, his first Egyptological work being Etat actuel des recherches egyptologiques (1906). Smoleński directed an archaeological expedition to Sharuna near Oxyrhynchus in 1907, discovering a huge necropolis of various periods; (see his article on the tomb of a Sixth Dynasty prince in ASAE8).

He also excavated another necropolis at el-Gamhud; some artifacts are in the Kraków Museums. Les peuples maritimes du nord a l'epoque de Ramses II et de Merenptah was published after his death. Smoleński was the real pioneer of Polish Egyptology, and his early death cut short a career of great promise.
