= Barbara Smolińska =

Polish artist

Barbara Smolińska is a Polish artist.

Smolińska began working in the world of music and cosmetic treatments. In 2013, she started collecting hyperrealistic dolls and later decided to start a hyperrealistic baby manufacturing company called Reborn Sugar Babies. These dolls have therapeutic benefits for their customers. Film studios, childbirth education schools, emergency rooms, nursing schools and doll collectors have purchased them. She argues that these dolls help process miscarriages, as well as anxiety, depression, and fertility problems. Prices of these dolls are worth from hundreds to thousands of dollars.

In December 2021, she was included in the list of BBC's 100 Women.
