= John Smolenski (historian) =

American historian (born 1973)

- Born: John Smolenski; May 11, 1973; Champaign, Illinois, U.S.
- Education: B.A. and M.A. in History from Yale University (1995), M.S. in Cultural Anthropology (1999), Ph.D. in History (2001) from University of Pennsylvania
- Occupations: Historian, Associate Professor
- Writing career
- Notable works: Friends and Strangers: The Making of a Creole Culture in Colonial Pennsylvania (2010), New World Orders: Violence, Sanction, and Authority in the Colonial Americas (2005)

John Smolenski (born May 11, 1973) is an American historian, known for his anthropological approach to colonial American history. His first book, Friends and Strangers: The Making of a Creole Culture in Colonial Pennsylvania, looks at Pennsylvania's turbulent early history as an example of the creolization process through which American colonists changed Old World cultural habits into New World cultural identities. This book represents one of the first attempts to use the creolization paradigm to analyze the development of the Anglo-American colonies. His published essays similarly draw upon concepts like performance theory (see performance studies) and speech act theory popularized in the social sciences and cultural studies.

Smolenski is currently an associate professor of history at the University of California, Davis.

== Works include ==
- Friends and Strangers: The Making of a Creole Culture in Colonial Pennsylvania. Philadelphia: University of Pennsylvania Press, 2010.
- New World Orders: Violence, Sanction, and Authority in the Colonial Americas. University of Pennsylvania Press. 2005. Archived from the original on October 1, 1999.
- From Men of Property to Just Men: Deference, Masculinity, and the Evolution of Political Discourse in Early America /Early American Studies/ 3(2005):253-285.
- Hearing Voices: Microhistory, Dialogicality and the Recovery of Popular Culture on an Eighteenth-Century Virginia Plantation, /Slavery & Abolition/ 24 (2003): 1–23.
