= Kotwica =

WWII Polish resistance emblem

- Adopted: 1942
- Motto: pomścimy Wawer; Polska walcząca
- Badge: Letters P and W forming an anchor
- Use: Home Army
- Designer: Anna Smoleńska

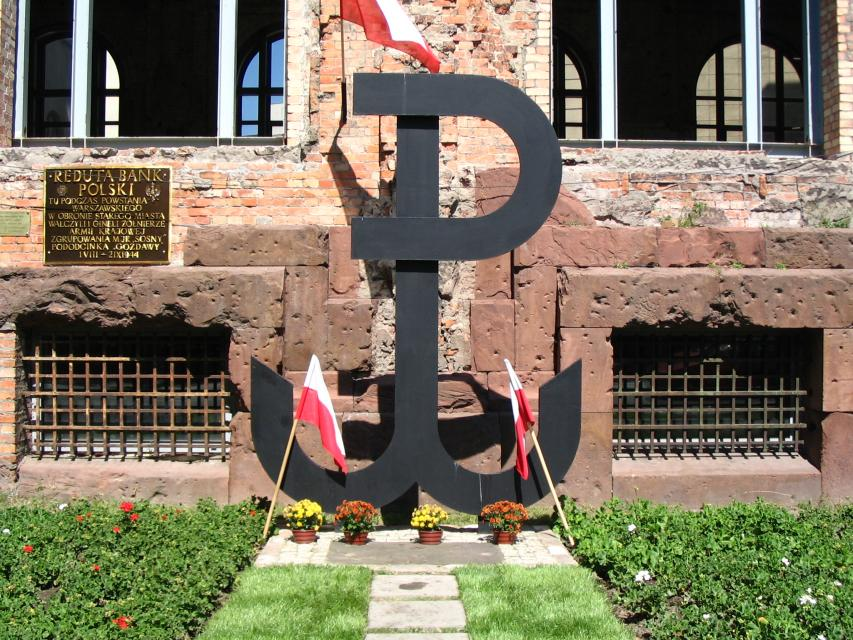
On a monument to the Warsaw Uprising at the Banku Polskiego in Warsaw

The kotwica ([kɔtˈfit͡sa]; Polish for 'anchor') was an emblem of the Polish Underground State and Armia Krajowa (AK; tr. 'Home Army') used during World War II. It was created in 1942 by members of the Wawer minor sabotage unit within the AK, as an easily usable emblem for the struggle to regain the country's independence. The initial meaning of the initialism PW was pomścimy Wawer (We shall avenge Wawer), in reference to the 1939 Wawer massacre, which was considered to be one of the first large scale massacres of Polish civilians by German troops in occupied Poland.

At first, Polish scouts from sabotage units painted the whole phrase upon walls. However, it was soon abbreviated to PW, which came to symbolise the phrase Polska walcząca (fighting Poland). In early 1942, the AK organised a contest to design an emblem to represent the resistance movement, and the winning design by Anna Smoleńska, a member of the Gray Ranks who herself participated in minor sabotage operations, combined the letters P and W into the kotwica. Smoleńska was arrested by the Gestapo in November 1942, and died in Auschwitz in March 1943, at the age of 23.

== History ==
The kotwica was first painted on walls in Warsaw on 20 March 1942 by Polish boy scouts, as a psychological warfare tactic against the occupying Germans. On 27 June, it was used for a new form of minor sabotage: in order to commemorate the day of the patron saint for President Władysław Raczkiewicz and commander-in-chief Władysław Sikorski, members of the AK stamped several hundred copies of the German propaganda newspaper Nowy Kurier Warszawski with the kotwica. This would become an annual event during the occupation: only 500 papers were defaced in the first year, but this the number grew to 7,000 the year after.

On 18 February 1943, General Stefan Rowecki, commander of the AK, issued an order specifying that all sabotage, partisan and terrorist actions be signed with the kotwica. On 25 February, Biuletyn Informacyjny, the official press outlet of the AK, called the kotwica "the sign of the underground Polish Army". The emblem gained enormous popularity and became recognised throughout the country. By the later stages of the war, most of the political and military organisations within Poland had adopted it as a symbol, even those not linked to the AK. It was painted on city walls, stamped on German banknotes and postage stamps, and printed on the headers of underground newspapers and books. It also became one of the symbols of the Warsaw Uprising, as PW is also an initialism for Wojsko Polskie and powstanie Warszawskie.

After the war, Poland's communist regime banned the kotwica, although it continued to be used abroad by associations of former AK members living in exile. Prohibition on the emblem's use was relaxed in the later years of communist rule, and in 1976 it became one of the symbols of Ruch Obrony Praw Człowieka i Obywatela (ROPCiO), an anti-communist organisation defending human rights in Poland. It was also adopted by other anti-communist political organisations, ranging from the rightist Confederation of Independent Poland (KPN) of Leszek Moczulski to Fighting Solidarity, an organisation formed in response to the de-legalisation of the independent trade union Solidarity and government repression of opposition after martial law was declared in 1981.

== Gallery ==
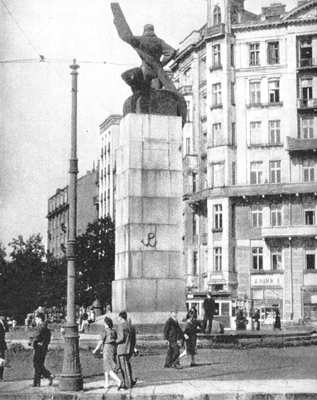
The Aviator Monument in Warsaw, taken during the German occupation, with kotwica graffiti added by Szare Szeregi member Jan Bytnar

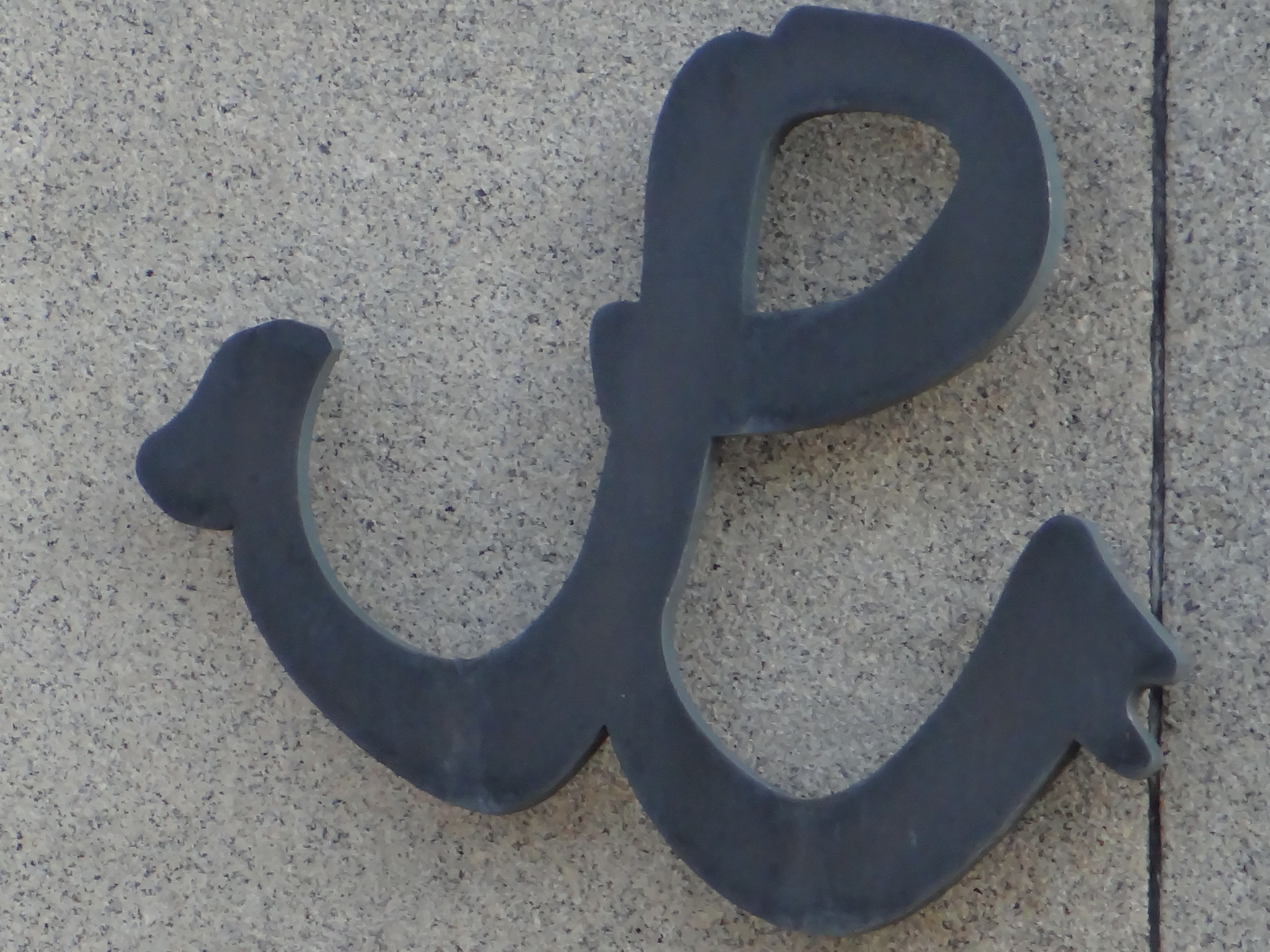
The kotwica that was permanently added to the Polish Pilots monument in 2010

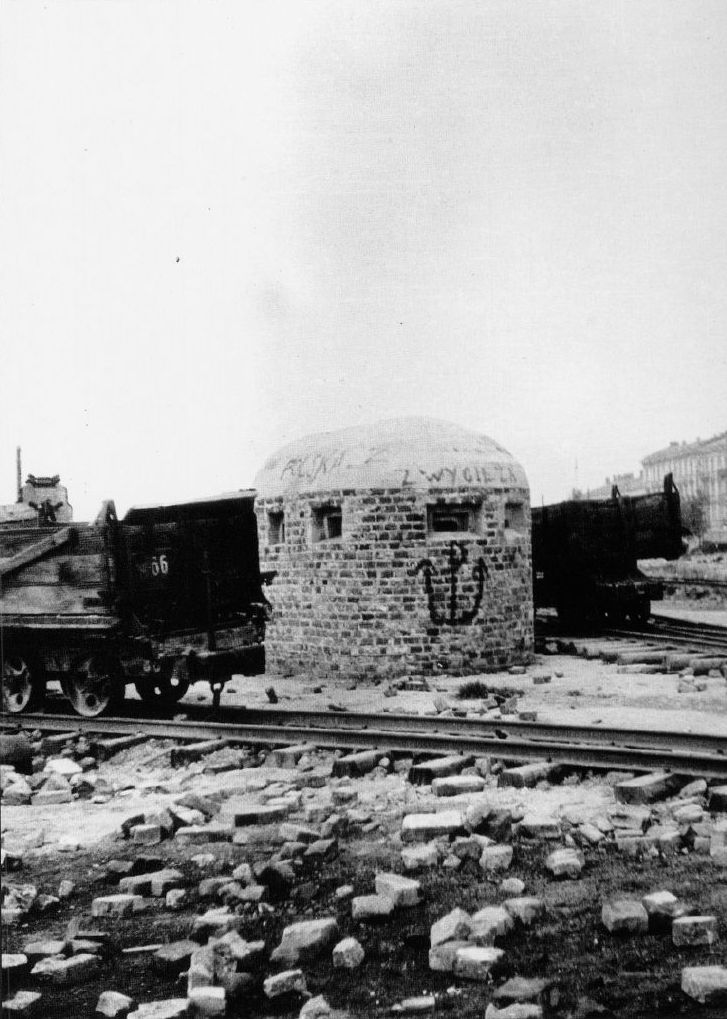
Painted on a German bunker near Bonifraterska Street during the Warsaw Uprising

The unofficial wartime flag of the Armia Krajowa and the Polish Underground State

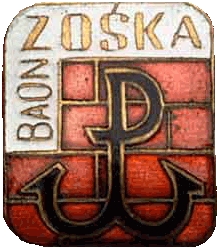
On the emblem of the Zośka battalion of the Armia Krajowa

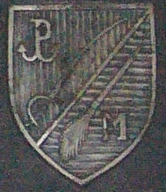
On the emblem of the Miotła battalion of the Armia Krajowa

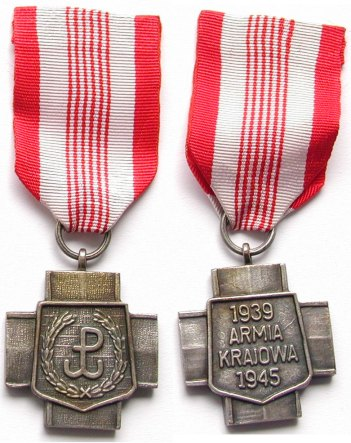
On the cross of the Armia Krajowa

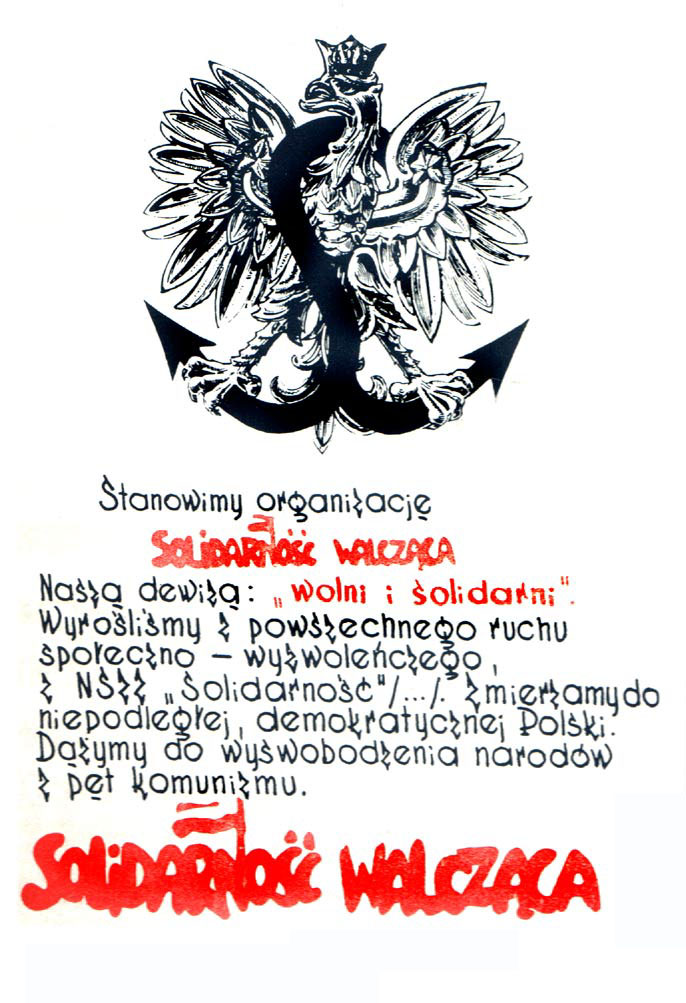
Incorporated into the Fighting Solidarity logo

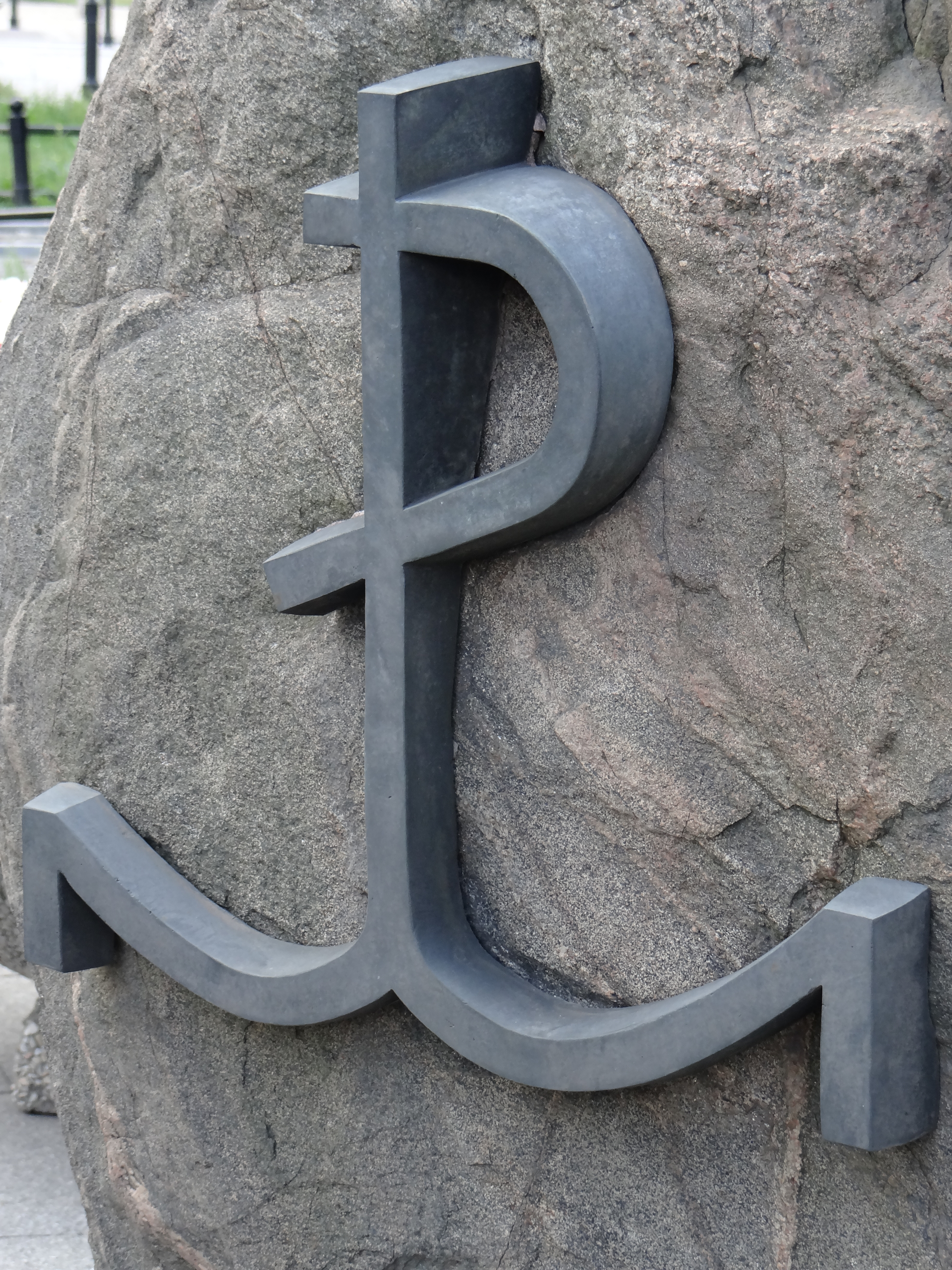
On the back of a memorial commemorating SS Police Chief Franz Kutschera's assassination by the Polish resistance

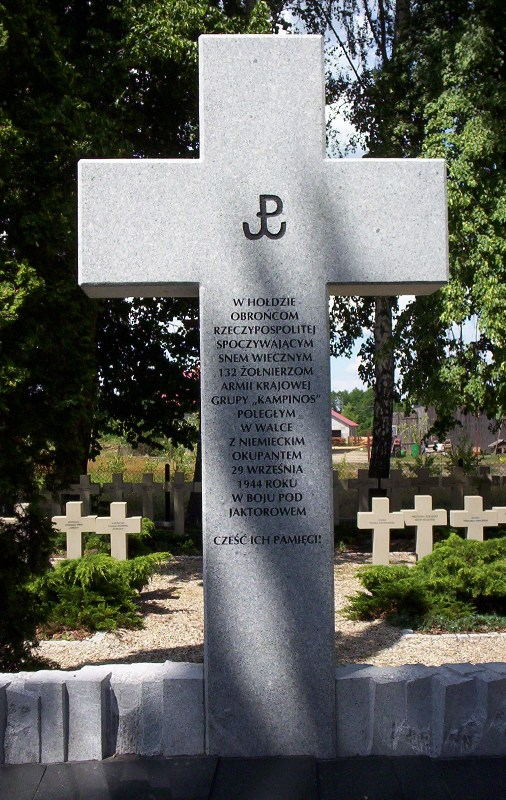
On a monument in the cemetery dedicated to the Kampinos Group of the AK in Budy Zosine

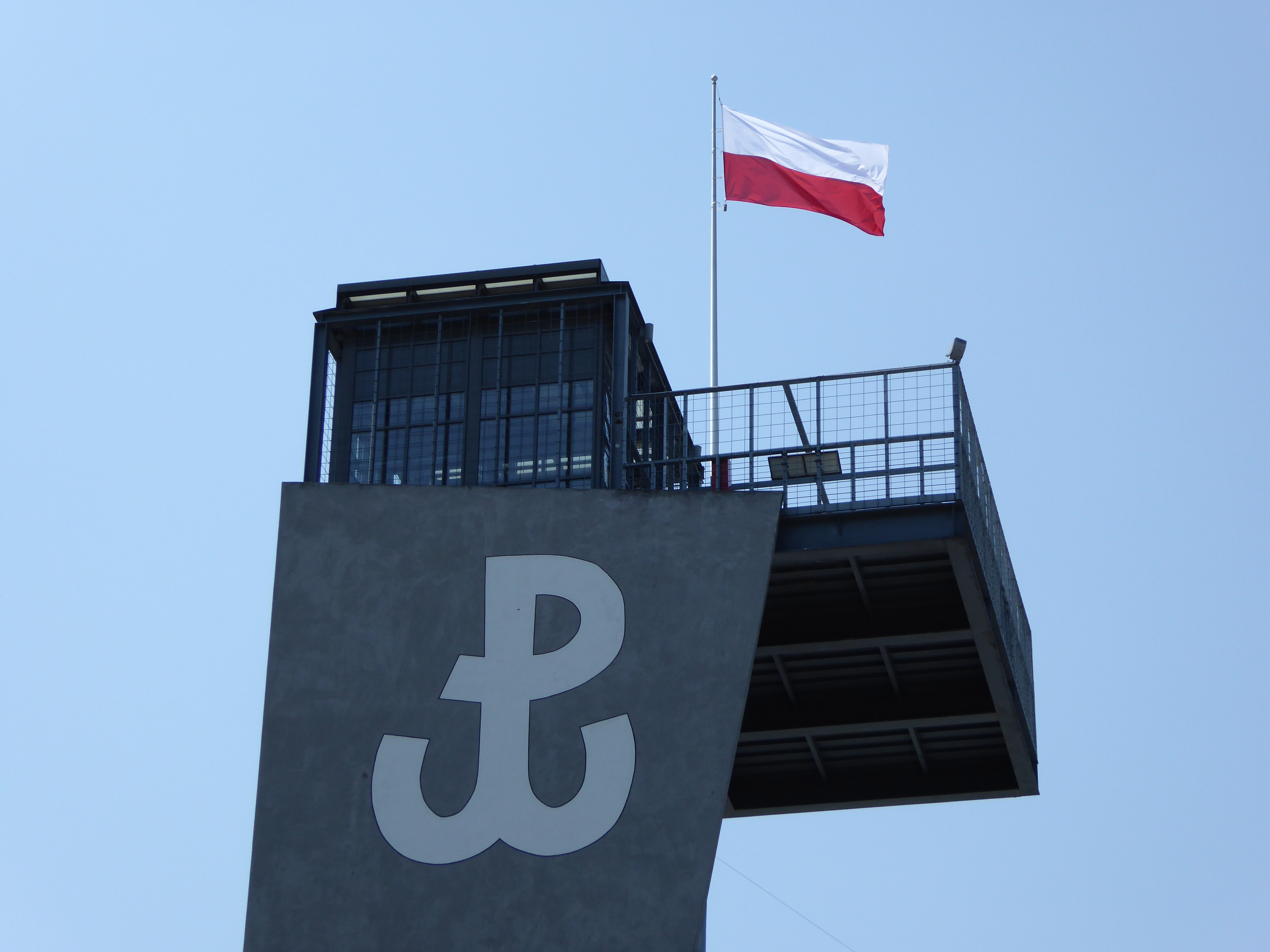
On the observation tower of the Warsaw Uprising Museum

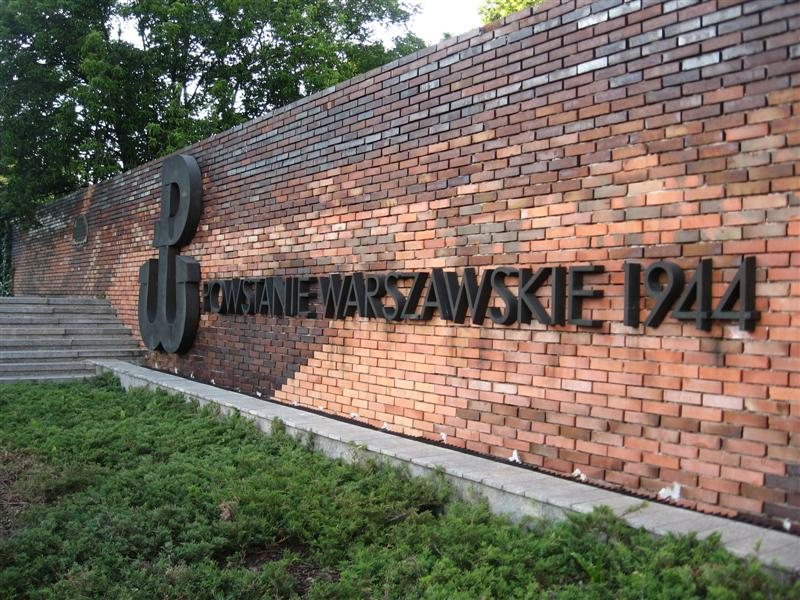
On the wall next to the Warsaw Uprising Monument in Krasiński Square

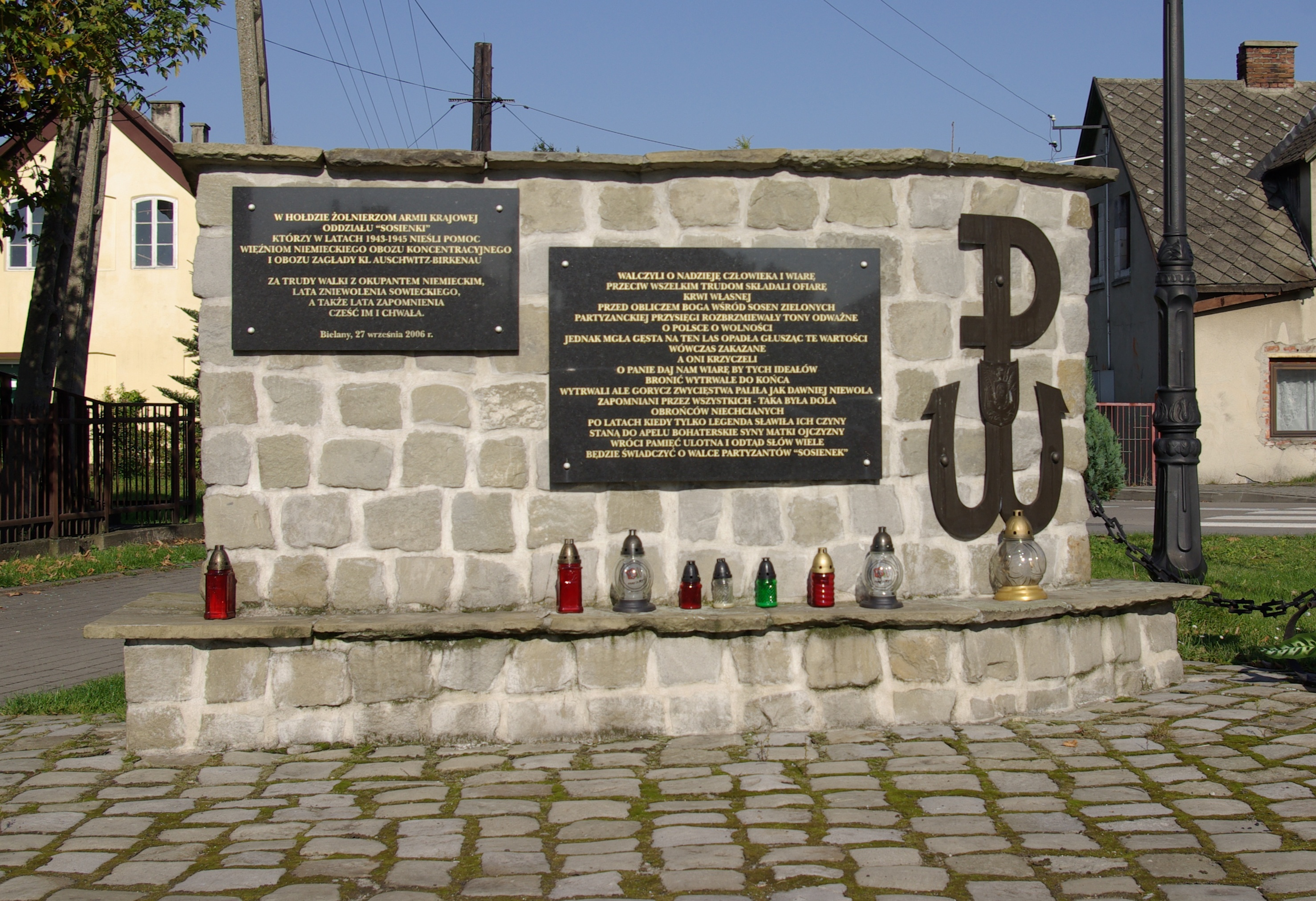
On the AK monument in Bielany

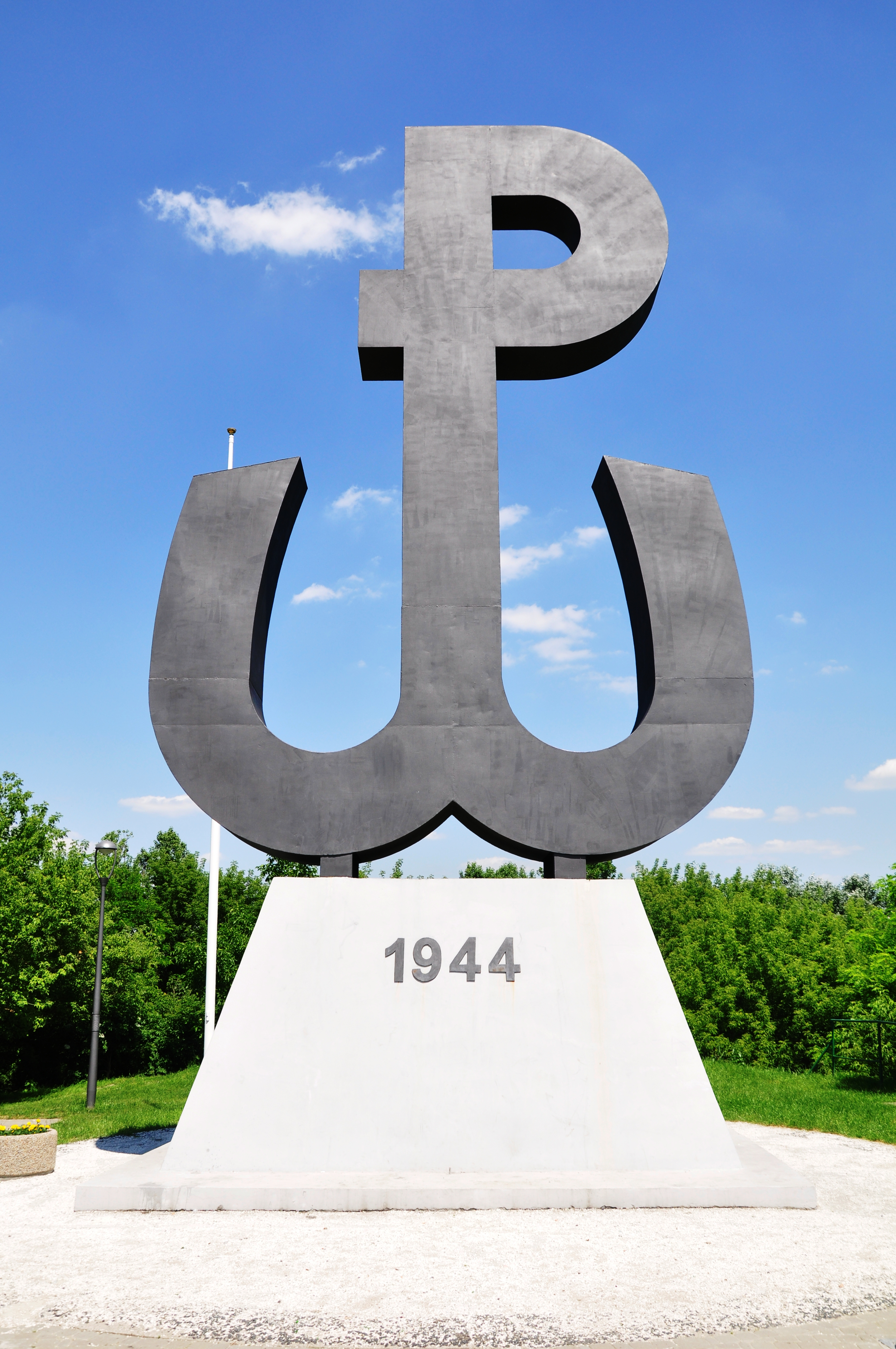
On top of Warsaw Uprising Hill

== See also ==
- Home Army
- Polish resistance movement in World War II
- Minor sabotage during World War II in Nazi-occupied Poland
- Warsaw Uprising
- Symbols of Poland
