= List of Warsaw Metro stations =

A map of the Warsaw Metro, showing the north–south Line M1 and the west–east Line M2

The planned Line M3

Since 28 September 2022, the Warsaw Metro has consisted of 2 lines and 39 stations. The system connects the city centre with Bielany, Praga-Północ, Targówek, Wola, Mokotów, Ursynów and Żoliborz. Upon completion, the M2 line will also run through Bemowo. Three additional metro lines are planned: M3, M4, and M5. The metro is managed by Metro Warszawskie.

== Current stations ==
Code	Name	Image	Line	Location	Date
A01	Kabaty		Line M1	Ursynów	7 April 1995
A02	Natolin		Line M1	Ursynów	7 April 1995
A03	Imielin		Line M1	Ursynów	7 April 1995
A04	Stokłosy		Line M1	Ursynów	7 April 1995
A05	Ursynów		Line M1	Ursynów	7 April 1995
A06	Służew		Line M1	Mokotów	7 April 1995
A07	Wilanowska		Line M1	Mokotów	7 April 1995
A08	Wierzbno		Line M1	Mokotów	7 April 1995
A09	Racławicka		Line M1	Mokotów	7 April 1995
A10	Pole Mokotowskie		Line M1	Mokotów	7 April 1995
A11	Politechnika		Line M1	Śródmieście	7 April 1995
A13	Centrum		Line M1	Śródmieście	26 May 1998
A14	Świętokrzyska		Line M1	Śródmieście	11 May 2001
A15	Ratusz Arsenał		Line M1	Śródmieście	11 May 2001
A17	Dworzec Gdański		Line M1	Śródmieście	20 December 2003
A18	Plac Wilsona		Line M1	Żoliborz	8 April 2005
A19	Marymont		Line M1	Żoliborz	29 December 2006
A20	Słodowiec		Line M1	Bielany	23 April 2008
A21	Stare Bielany		Line M1	Bielany	25 October 2008
A22	Wawrzyszew		Line M1	Bielany	25 October 2008
A23	Młociny		Line M1	Bielany	25 October 2008
C04	Bemowo		Line M2	Bemowo	30 June 2022
C05	Ulrychów		Line M2	Bemowo	30 June 2022
C06	Księcia Janusza		Line M2	Wola	4 April 2020
C07	Młynów		Line M2	Wola	4 April 2020
C08	Płocka		Line M2	Wola	4 April 2020
C09	Rondo Daszyńskiego		Line M2	Wola	8 March 2015
C10	Rondo ONZ		Line M2	Wola / Śródmieście	8 March 2015
C11	Świętokrzyska		Line M2	Śródmieście	8 March 2015
C12	Nowy Świat-Uniwersytet		Line M2	Śródmieście	8 March 2015
C13	Centrum Nauki Kopernik		Line M2	Śródmieście	8 March 2015
C14	Stadion Narodowy		Line M2 Line M3	Praga-Północ	8 March 2015
C15	Dworzec Wileński		Line M2	Praga-Północ	8 March 2015
C16	Szwedzka		Line M2	Praga-Północ	15 September 2019
C17	Targówek Mieszkaniowy		Line M2	Targówek	15 September 2019
C18	Trocka		Line M2	Targówek	15 September 2019
C19	Zacisze		Line M2	Targówek	28 September 2022
C20	Kondratowicza		Line M2	Targówek	28 September 2022
C21	Bródno		Line M2	Targówek	28 September 2022

== Future stations ==
The last two stations for the completion of the Line M1, Plac Konstytucji and Muranów

Code	Name	Line	Date	Status
A12	Plac Konstytucji	Line M1	by 2050	Planned
A16	Muranów	Line M1	by 2050	Planned
C01	Karolin	Line M2	2026	Under construction
C02	Chrzanów	Line M2	2026	Under construction
C03	Lazurowa	Line M2	2026	Under construction
E01	Dworzec Wschodni	Line M3	2032	Planned
E02	Mińska	Line M3	2032	Planned
E03	Rondo Wiatraczna	Line M3	2032	Planned
E04	Ostrobramska	Line M3	2032	Planned
E05	Jana Nowaka-Jeziorańskiego	Line M3	2032	Planned
E06	Gocław	Line M3	2032	Planned
E07	Gościniec	Line M3	by 2050	Planned
E08	Siekierki	Line M3	by 2050	Planned
E09	Czerniaków	Line M3	by 2050	Planned
E10	Sielce	Line M3	by 2050	Planned
E11	Stary Mokotów	Line M3	by 2050	Planned
E12	Racławicka	Line M3	by 2050	Planned
E13	Wyględów	Line M3	by 2050	Planned
E14	Żwirki i Wigury	Line M3	by 2050	Planned
G01	Wilanów	Line M4	by 2050	Planned
G02	Sobieskiego	Line M4	by 2050	Planned
G03	Patkowskiego	Line M4	by 2050	Planned
G04	Dolina Służewiecka	Line M4	by 2050	Planned
G05	Wilanowska	Line M4	by 2050	Planned
G06	Smoluchowskiego	Line M4	by 2050	Planned
G07	Rondo Unii Europejskiej	Line M4	by 2050	Planned
G08	Służewiec	Line M4	by 2050	Planned
G09	Żwirki i Wigury	Line M4	by 2050	Planned
G10	Wiślicka	Line M4	by 2050	Planned
G11	Bitwy Warszawskiej 1920	Line M4	by 2050	Planned
G12	Plac Narutowicza	Line M4	by 2050	Planned
G13	Plac Zawiszy	Line M4	by 2050	Planned
G14	Rondo Daszyńskiego	Line M4	by 2050	Planned
G15	Okopowa	Line M4	by 2050	Planned
G16	Cmentarz Żydowski	Line M4	by 2050	Planned
G17	Rondo Radosława	Line M4	by 2050	Planned
G18	Rydygiera	Line M4	by 2050	Planned
G19	Marymont	Line M4	by 2050	Planned
G20	Ruda	Line M4	by 2050	Planned
G21	Płochocińska	Line M4	by 2050	Planned
G22	Obrazkowa	Line M4	by 2050	Planned
G23	Myśliborska	Line M4	by 2050	Planned
