= Plac Konstytucji metro station =

Warsaw metro station

Coordinates: 52°13′31″N 21°0′51″E

Plac Konstytucji (English: Constitution Square) is a planned Warsaw Metro station in the corner of Marszałkowska and Hoża streets, about 300 metres north of the Constitution Square.

The original plans for the construction were temporarily dropped in 1989 due to budget constraints. In September 2019, the Warsaw city council announced that the project would finally take place. A contractor was decided, having until 2026 to build the station.

== See also ==
- List of Warsaw Metro stations

Preceding station	Warsaw Metro	Following station
Centrum towards Młociny	M1 line	Politechnika towards Kabaty
