= Ratusz Arsenał metro station =

Warsaw metro station

Ratusz Arsenał
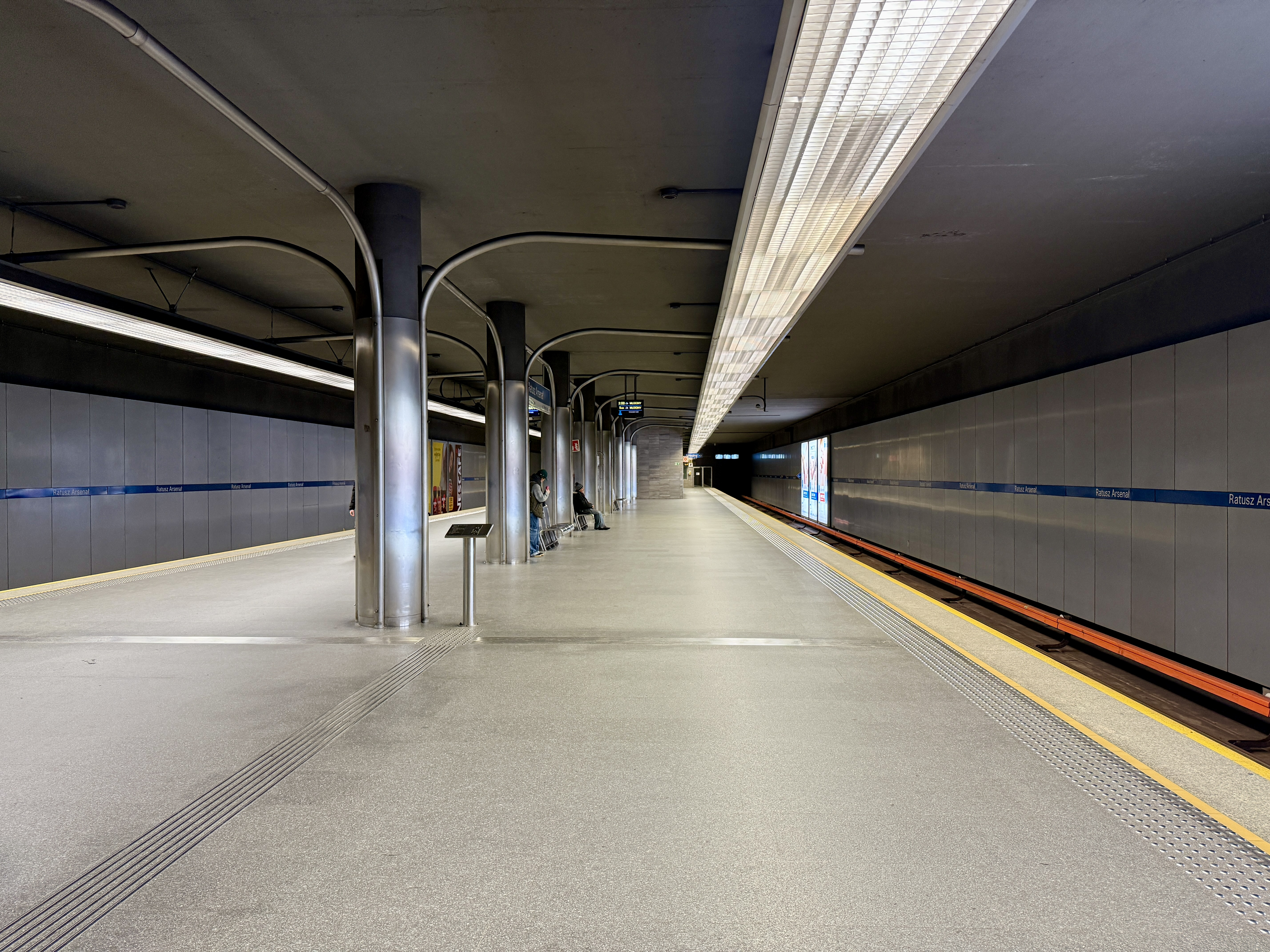

General information
- Coordinates: 52°14′41″N 21°0′2″E
- Owner: Public Transport Authority
- Platforms: 1 island platform
- Tracks: 2
- Connections: 107, 111, 160, 190; E-2; N21, N41, N71, N91; 4, 13, 15, 16, 18, 20, 23, 26, 36, T

Construction
- Structure type: Underground
- Platform levels: 1
- Accessible: Yes

Other information
- Station code: A-15
- Fare zone: 1

History
- Opened: 11 May 2001; 25 years ago
- Former names: Ratusz

Services
Preceding station	Warsaw Metro	Following station
Dworzec Gdański towards Młociny	M1 line	Świętokrzyska towards Kabaty
Location
- Location within Warsaw

Ratusz Arsenał is a station on Line M1 of the Warsaw Metro, Poland, located under the Plac Bankowy (English: Bank Square) in the borough of Śródmieście. The station was opened on 11 May 2001 as the northern terminus of the extension from Centrum. On 20 December 2003 the line was extended further north to Dworzec Gdański. It takes its name from the Warsaw City Hall (Polish: Ratusz) located on the western side of the square. Warsaw Arsenal is also located near the station. It is the closest station to the Warsaw Old Town and the Royal Castle.

Before 29 December 2006 the name of the station was Ratusz, when it was renamed at the Government's request.

== See also ==
- Muranów (Warsaw Metro) a planned station, not built at this time, is to the north of this station.
- Sticky - Kiss of Life song whose music video was shot outside the station, in front of one of the entrances.
