= Centrum metro station =

Warsaw metro station

Centrum
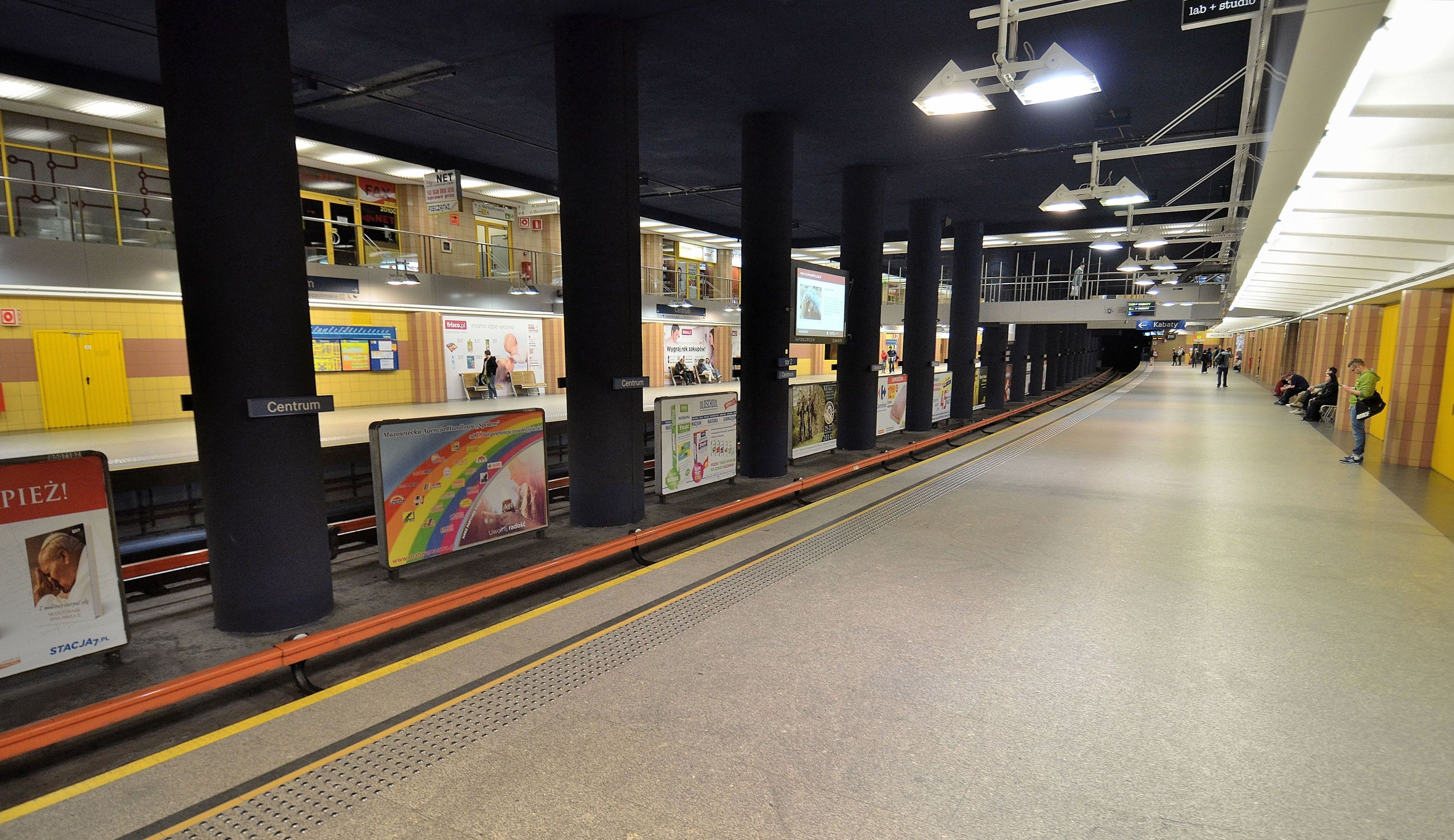

General information
- Coordinates: 52°13′53″N 21°0′38″E
- Owner: Public Transport Authority
- Platforms: 2 side platforms
- Tracks: 2
- Connections: Warszawa Centralna; Warszawa Śródmieście; Warszawa Śródmieście WKD; 100, 117, 127, 128, 131, 158, 171, 175, 507, 517, 520, 521, 525; N22, N24, N25, N31, N32, N33, N35, N37, N38, N42, N72, N81, N83, N85, N88; 4, 7, 9, 15, 16, 18, 22, 24, 25, 36, T

Construction
- Structure type: Underground
- Platform levels: 1
- Accessible: Yes

Other information
- Station code: A-13
- Fare zone: 1

History
- Opened: 26 May 1998; 28 years ago

Services
Preceding station	Warsaw Metro	Following station
Świętokrzyska towards Młociny	M1 line	Politechnika towards Kabaty
Route map
Location
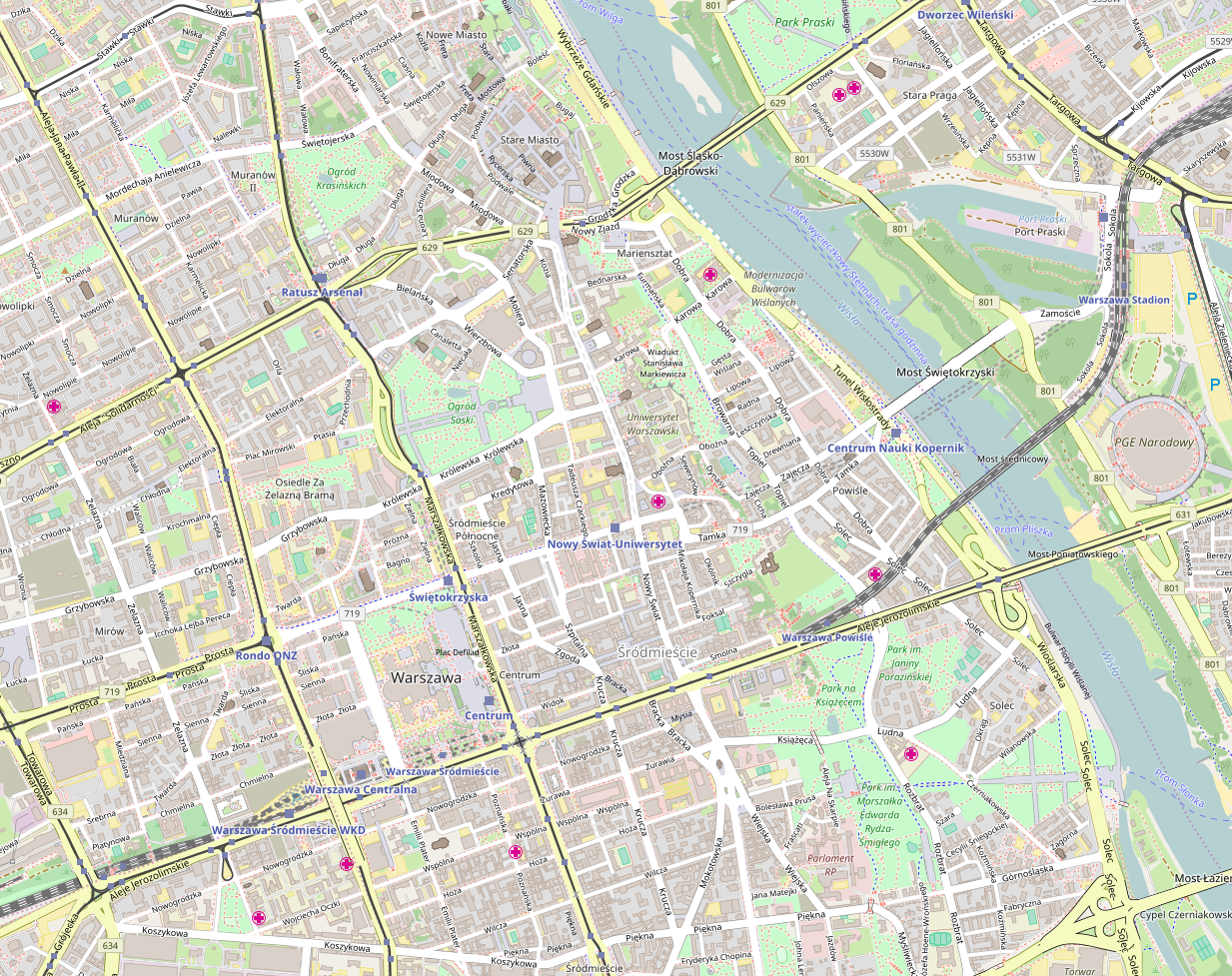
- Location within Warsaw Location within Masovian Voivodeship

Centrum is a station on Line M1 of the Warsaw Metro, located under Plac Defilad, a square in the borough of Śródmieście, next to the Dmowski roundabout, where the two main streets, Marszałkowska and Aleje Jerozolimskie, intersect. It is located close to the Palace of Culture and Science and connections can be made, via Pasaż Wisławy Szymborskiej and Aleje Jerozolimskie at ground level, to Warszawa Śródmieście railway station which is in turn directly connected to Warszawa Centralna railway station. It has two levels: the lower one contains the platforms and the upper one is a shopping mall.

The station was opened on 26 May 1998 as the northern terminus of the extension from Politechnika. On 11 May 2001, the line was extended north to Ratusz.

== See also ==
- Plac Konstytucji: a planned station south of Centrum
