= Politechnika metro station =

Warsaw metro station

Politechnika
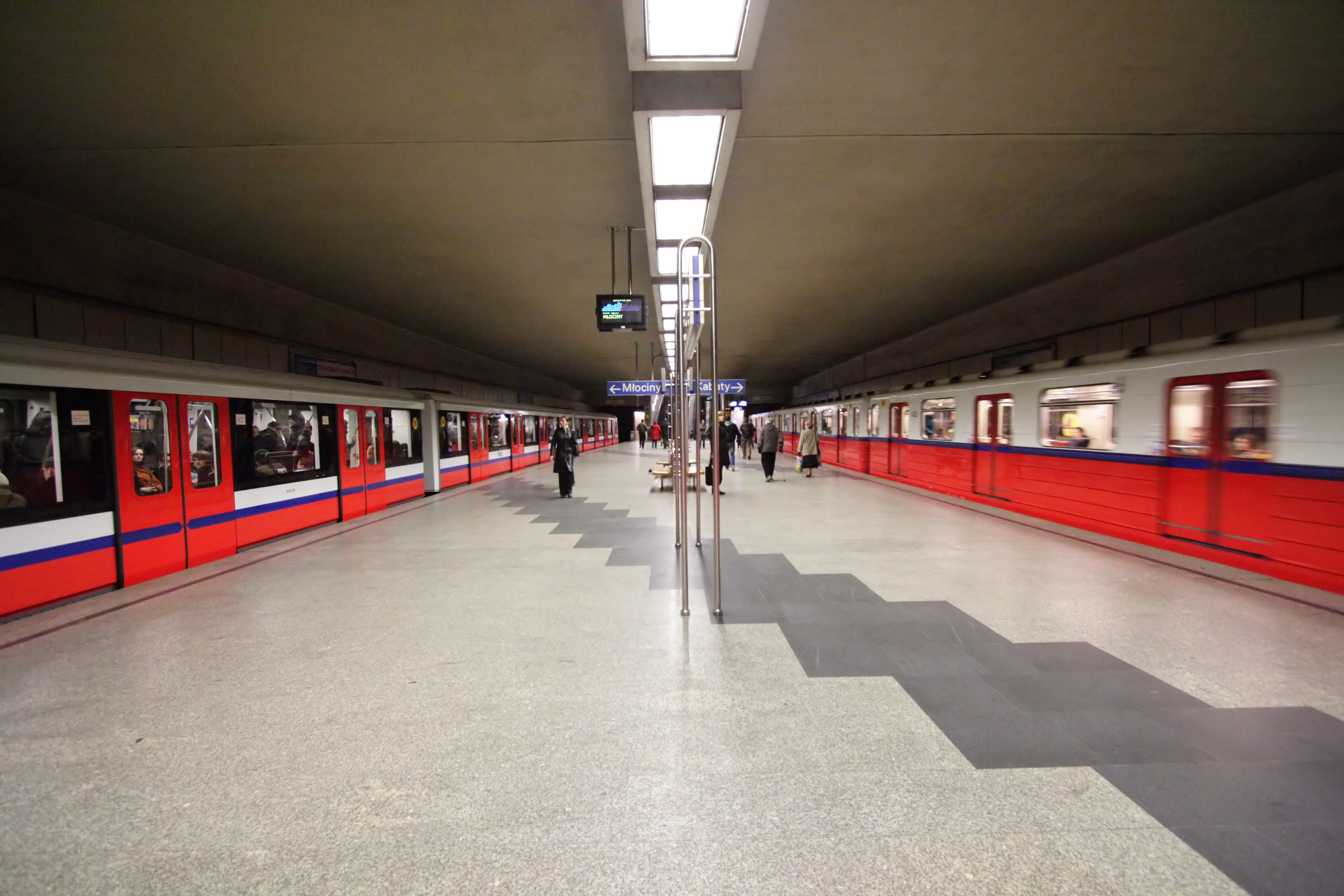

General information
- Coordinates: 52°13′6″N 21°0′55″E
- Owner: Public Transport Authority
- Platforms: 1 island platform
- Tracks: 2
- Connections: 118, 143, 151, 182, 187, 188, 411, 502, 514, 520, 523, 525; N25, N31, N37, N81; 10, 11, 14, 15, 16, 36

Construction
- Structure type: Underground
- Platform levels: 1
- Accessible: Yes

Other information
- Station code: A-11
- Fare zone: 1

History
- Opened: 7 April 1995; 31 years ago

Services
Preceding station	Warsaw Metro	Following station
Centrum towards Młociny	M1 line	Pole Mokotowskie towards Kabaty
Location
- Location within Warsaw

Politechnika Metro is a station on Line M1 of the Warsaw Metro, located near the main campus of Warsaw University of Technology (Polish: Politechnika Warszawska) in Central Warsaw.

The station was opened on 7 April 1995 as the northern terminus of the inaugural stretch of the Warsaw Metro, between Kabaty and Politechnika. On 26 May 1998 the line was extended north to Centrum.

== See also ==
- Plac Konstytucji: a planned station north of this station.
- Zebra Tower, adjoins the station
