= Słodowiec metro station =

Warsaw metro station

Słodowiec
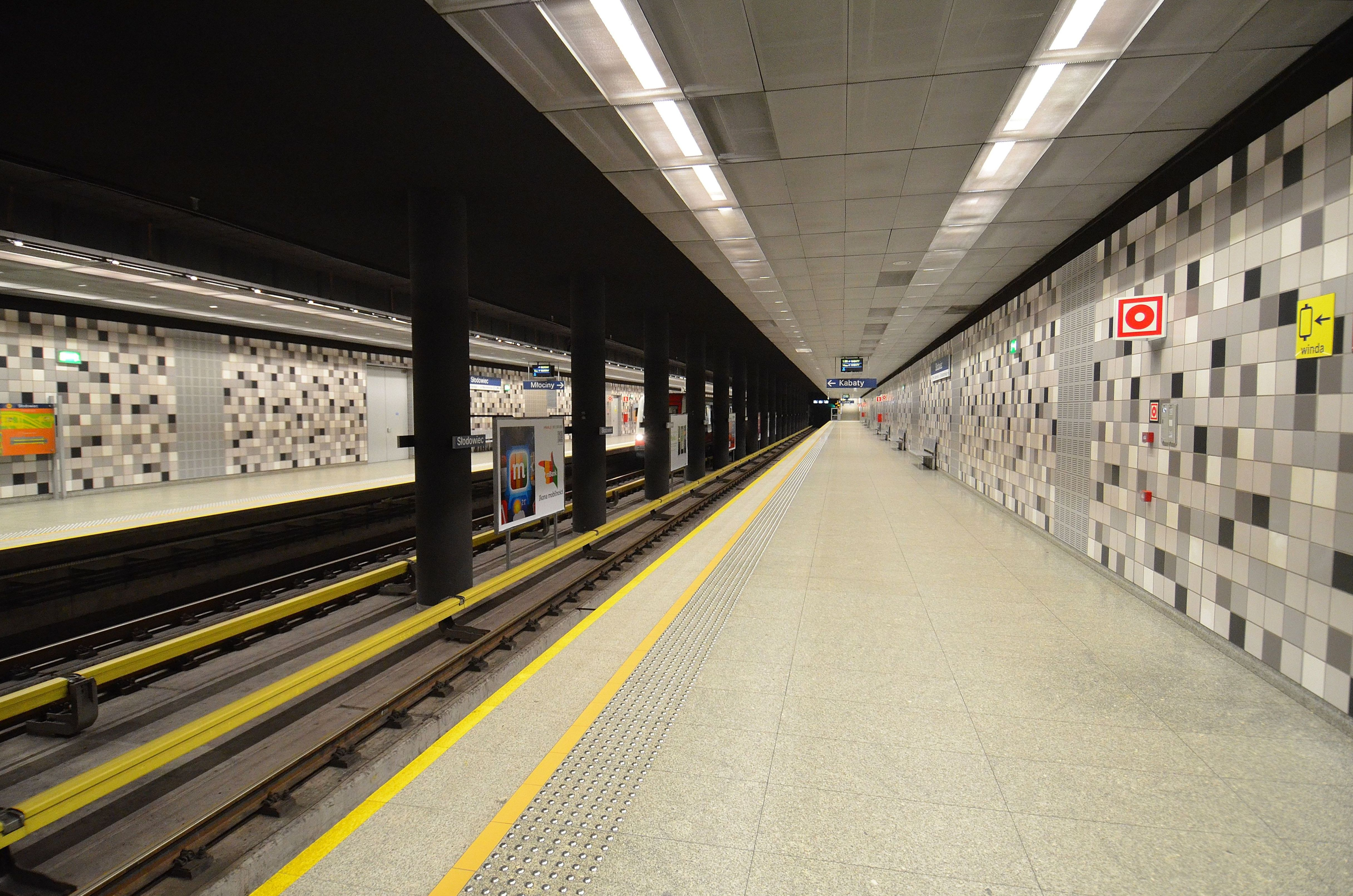

General information
- Coordinates: 52°16′35″N 20°57′41″E
- Owner: Public Transport Authority
- Platforms: 2 side platforms
- Tracks: 2
- Connections: 110, 112, 116, 156, 755; N02, N44; 6, 17

Construction
- Structure type: Underground
- Platform levels: 1
- Accessible: Yes

Other information
- Station code: A-20
- Fare zone: 1

History
- Opened: 23 April 2008; 18 years ago

Services
Preceding station	Warsaw Metro	Following station
Stare Bielany towards Młociny	M1 line	Marymont towards Kabaty
Location
- Location within Warsaw

Metro Słodowiec is the 18th working station on Line M1 of the Warsaw Metro. It was opened on 23 April 2008 as the northern terminus of the extension from Marymont. On 25 October 2008, the line was extended further north to Młociny.

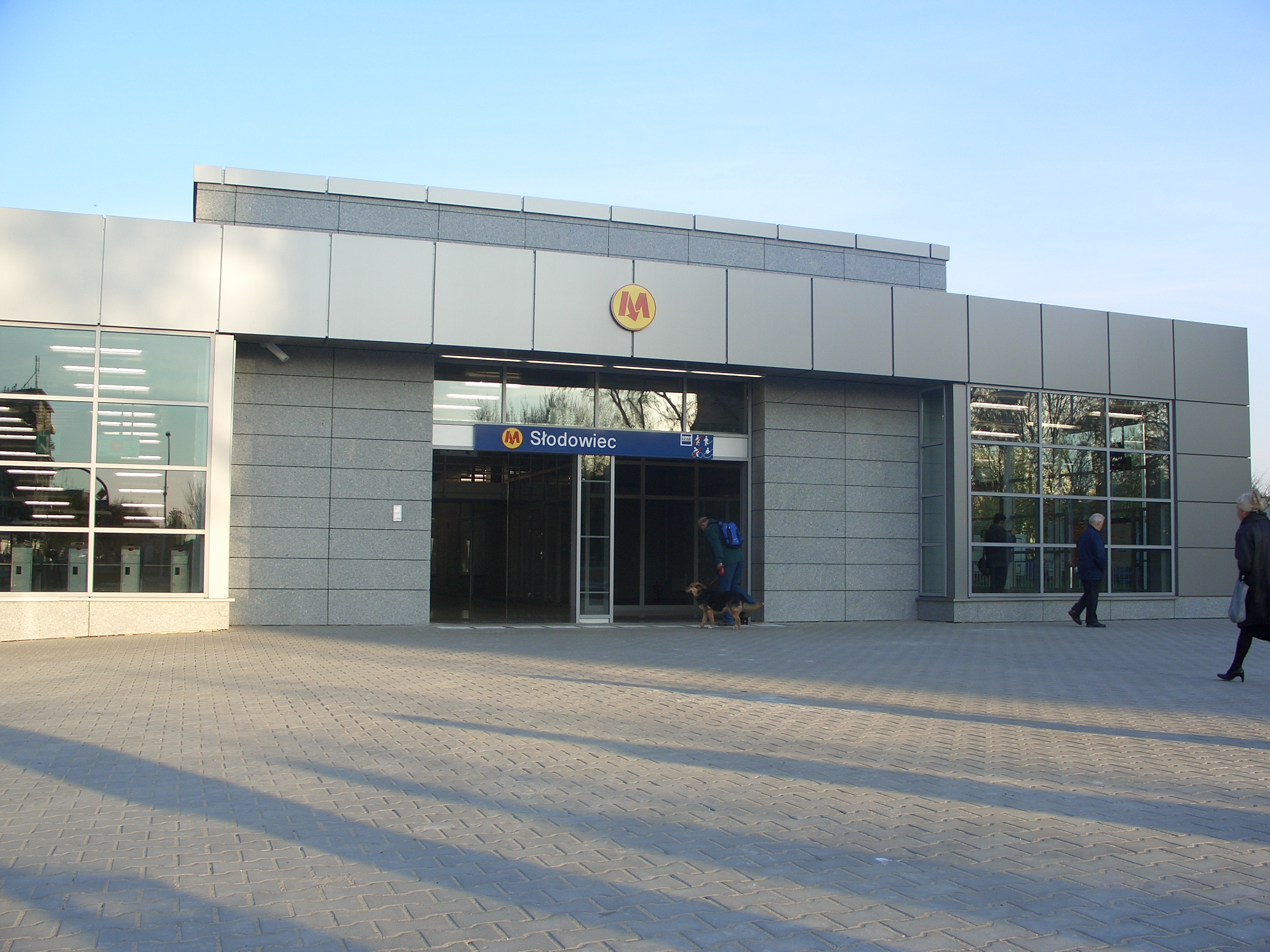
View of the station entrance
