= Dworzec Gdański metro station =

Warsaw metro station

Dworzec Gdański
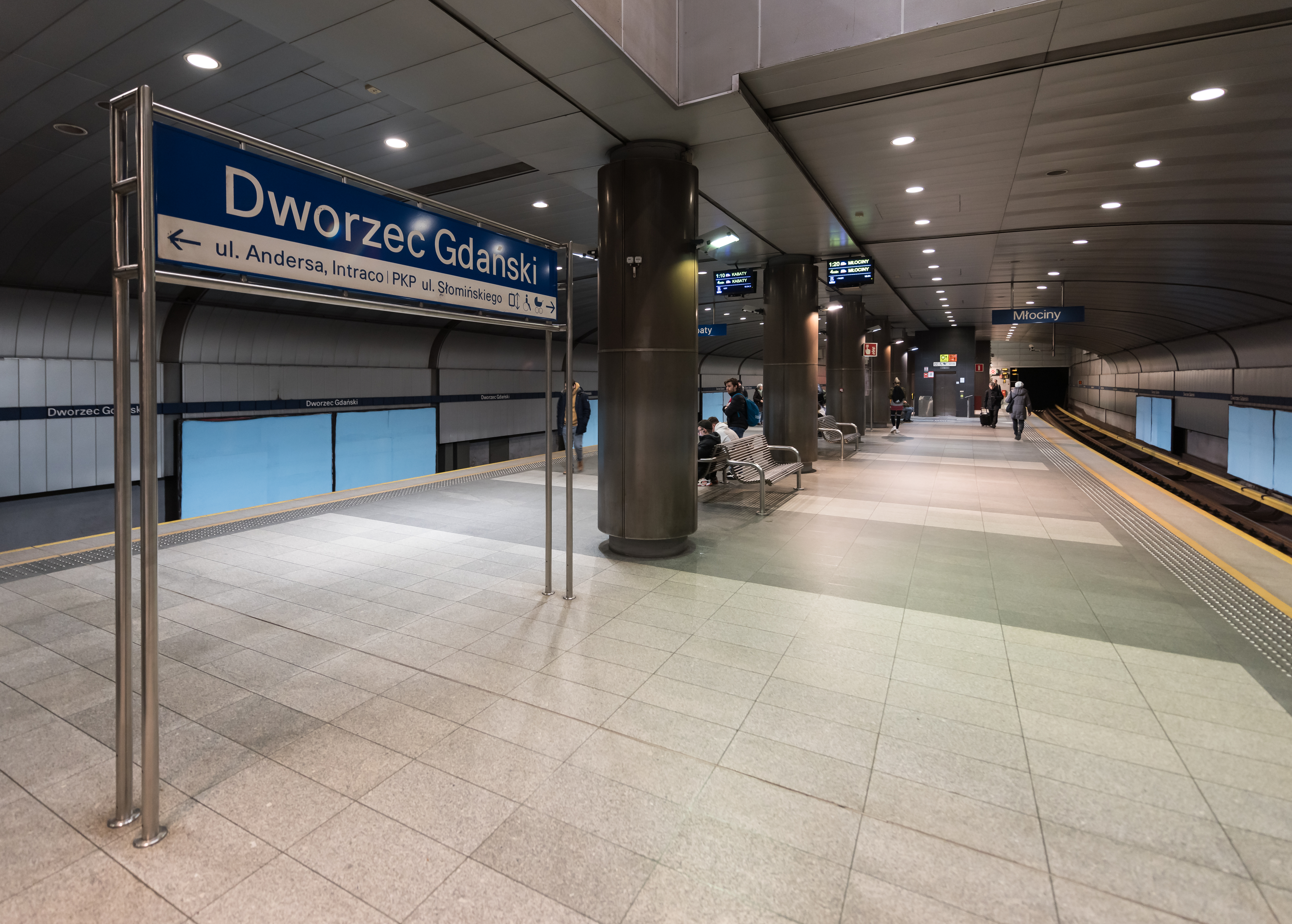

General information
- Coordinates: 52°15′28″N 20°59′40″E
- Owner: Public Transport Authority
- Platforms: 1 island platform
- Tracks: 2
- Connections: Warszawa Gdańska; 116, 157, 221, 409, 500, 518; N12, N44, N62; 1, 6, 15, 28, 36

Construction
- Structure type: Underground
- Platform levels: 1
- Accessible: Yes

Other information
- Station code: A-17
- Fare zone: 1

History
- Opened: 20 December 2003; 22 years ago

Services
Preceding station	Warsaw Metro	Following station
Plac Wilsona towards Młociny	M1 line	Ratusz Arsenał towards Kabaty
Location
- Location within Warsaw

Dworzec Gdański (Gdańsk Train Station) is a station on Line M1 of the Warsaw Metro, located just south of the Warszawa Gdańska railway station, at the viaduct of Andersa Street over Słomińskiego Street. It is one of the major transport hubs in the northern part of the city of Warsaw. The station was opened on 20 December 2003 as the northern terminus of the extension from Ratusz. On 8 April 2005 the line was extended further north to Plac Wilsona.

The A-17 Dworzec Gdański, to give its official name, is a two-storey station, with a single central platform located on the lower level. The platform is 12 metres wide and 120 metres long. The overall length of the station itself is 156 metres and the width is 20.4 metres. Both ends of the station are equipped with escalators and stairs, as well as elevators. The gallery above the station contains shops, a police station and a ticket office. It also serves as a subway (underpass) under Słomińskiego street.

The municipal transport hub within walking distance includes numerous bus (urban and suburban) and tram stops. A direct underground link with the railway station was opened in February 2011.

== See also ==
- Muranów (Warsaw Metro) a planned station, but not yet built
