= Stare Bielany metro station =

Warsaw metro station

Stare Bielany
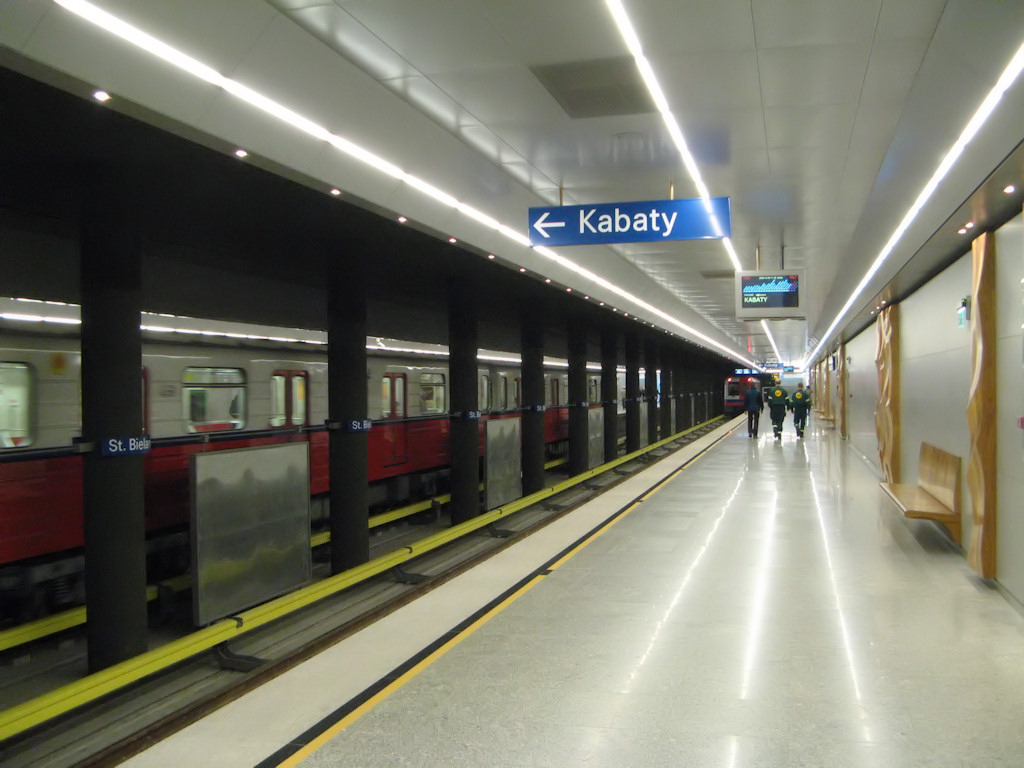

General information
- Coordinates: 52°16′55″N 20°56′58″E
- Owner: Public Transport Authority
- Platforms: 2 side platforms
- Tracks: 2
- Connections: 103, 156, 181, 197

Construction
- Structure type: Underground
- Platform levels: 1
- Accessible: Yes

Other information
- Station code: A-21
- Fare zone: 1

History
- Opened: 25 October 2008; 17 years ago

Services
Preceding station	Warsaw Metro	Following station
Wawrzyszew towards Młociny	M1 line	Słodowiec towards Kabaty
Location

Metro Stare Bielany became the 19th working station on Line M1 of the Warsaw Metro when it opened on 25 October 2008 as part of the extension from Słodowiec to Młociny. It had been under construction since June, 2006. Originally, the station was to be called Bielany. The station is distinctive due to a series of wooden relief sculptures on the walls.
