= Muranów metro station =

Warsaw metro station

Coordinates: 52°15′0″N 20°59′56″E

A-16 Muranów is a planned Warsaw Metro station in the Muranów neighbourhood (crossroads of Anielewicza and Andersa streets), 635 metres north of A-15 Ratusz Arsenał and 899 metres south of A-17 Dworzec Gdański.

The original plans for the construction were temporarily dropped in 1989 due to budget constraints. In September 2019, the Warsaw city council announced that the project would finally take place. A contractor was decided, having until 2026 to build the station.

== See also ==
- List of Warsaw Metro stations

Preceding station	Warsaw Metro	Following station
Dworzec Gdański towards Młociny	M1 line	Ratusz Arsenał towards Kabaty
