= Świętokrzyska metro station =

Warsaw metro station

Świętokrzyska
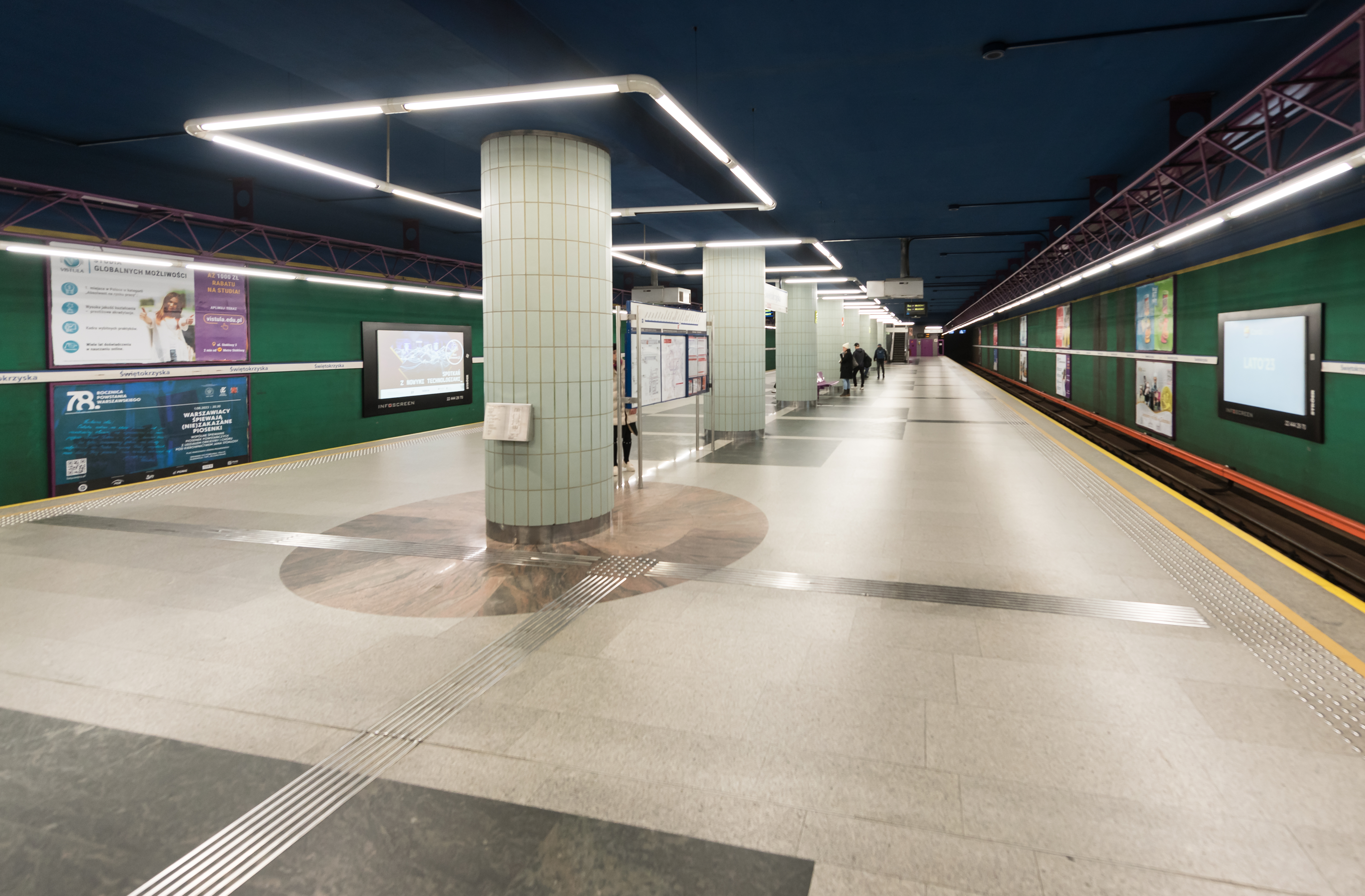

General information
- Coordinates: 52°14′9″N 21°0′27″E
- Owner: Public Transport Authority
- Platforms: 2 island platforms (one on each level)
- Tracks: 4 (2 on each level)
- Connections: 171, 178; N11, N13, N14, N16, N21, N32, N35, N38, N41, N42, N44, N61, N63, N64, N66, N71, N85, N88, N91; 4, 15, 16, 18, 36

Construction
- Structure type: Underground
- Platform levels: 2
- Accessible: Yes

Other information
- Station code: A-14 (M1); C-11 (M2)
- Fare zone: 1

History
- Opened: 11 May 2001 (M1); 8 March 2015 (M2)

Services
Preceding station	Warsaw Metro	Following station
Ratusz Arsenał towards Młociny	M1 line	Centrum towards Kabaty
Rondo ONZ towards Bemowo	M2 line	Nowy Świat-Uniwersytet towards Bródno
Location
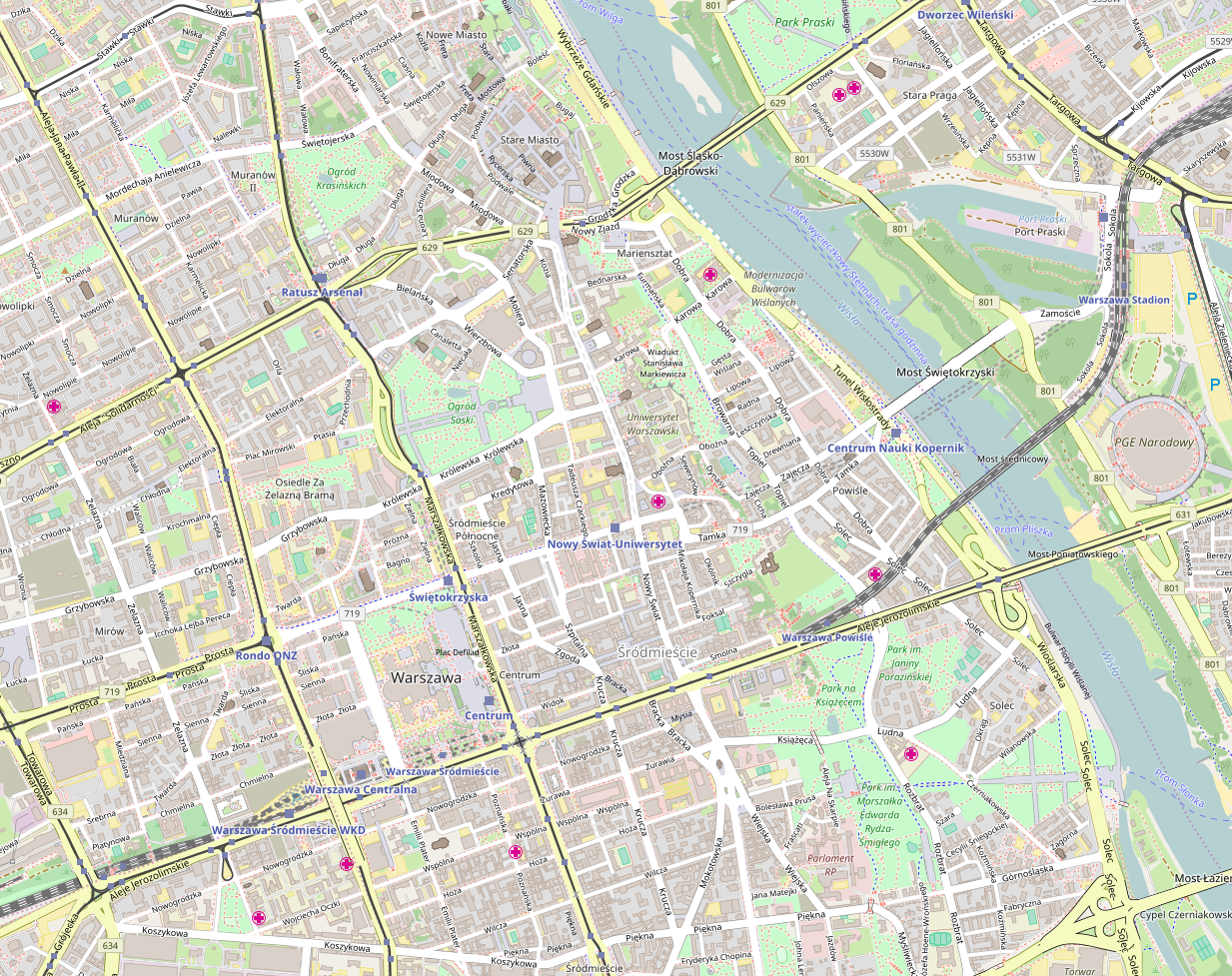
- Location within Warsaw Location within Masovian Voivodeship

Świętokrzyska (Polish pronunciation: [ɕfjɛntɔˈkʂɨska]) is a transfer station on Lines M1 and M2 of the Warsaw Metro, located under the crossing of Świętokrzyska and Marszałkowska streets in the borough of Śródmieście. The station on M1 was opened on 11 May 2001 as part of the extension of M1 north from Centrum to Ratusz. Świętokrzyska has a non-revenue track that connects Lines M1 and M2 in order for M2 rolling stock to access Kabaty depot on M1 while the new Karolin depot on M2 is being built, and is the only interchange station between M1 and M2 metro lines. The station on the second metro line fully opened for passenger use on 8 March 2015 as part of the inaugural stretch of Line M2 between Rondo Daszyńskiego and Dworzec Wileński. It was designed by Polish architect Andrzej M. Chołdzyński and constructed by Metroprojekt. Murals were created by Wojciech Fangor, artist of the Polish School of Posters.

== Gallery ==
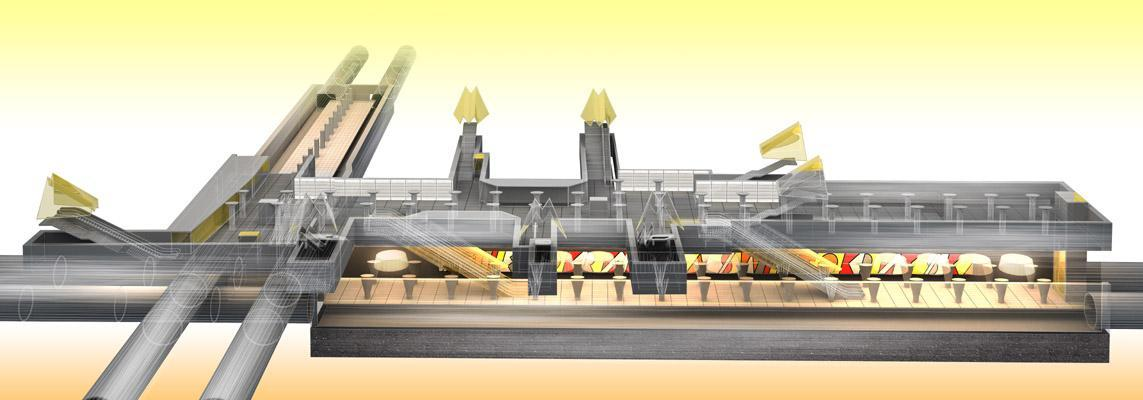
Cross-section illustration of the station

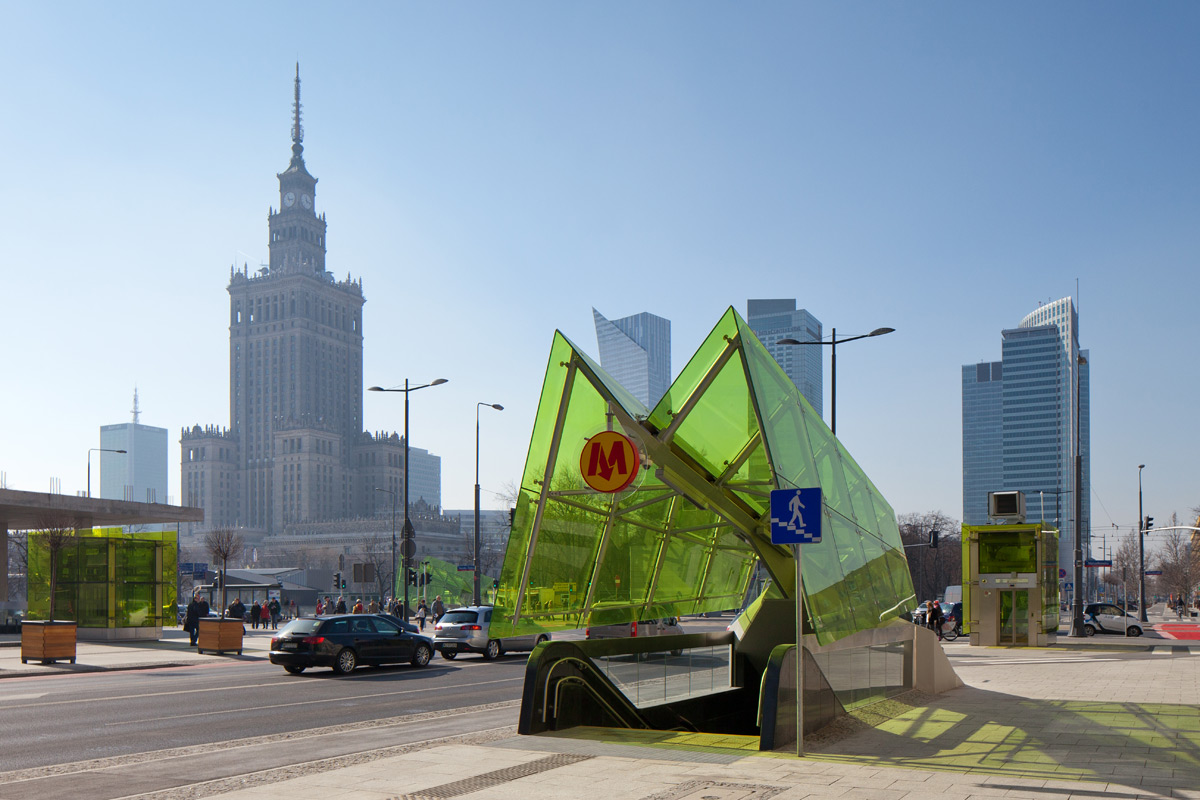
Entrance to the station

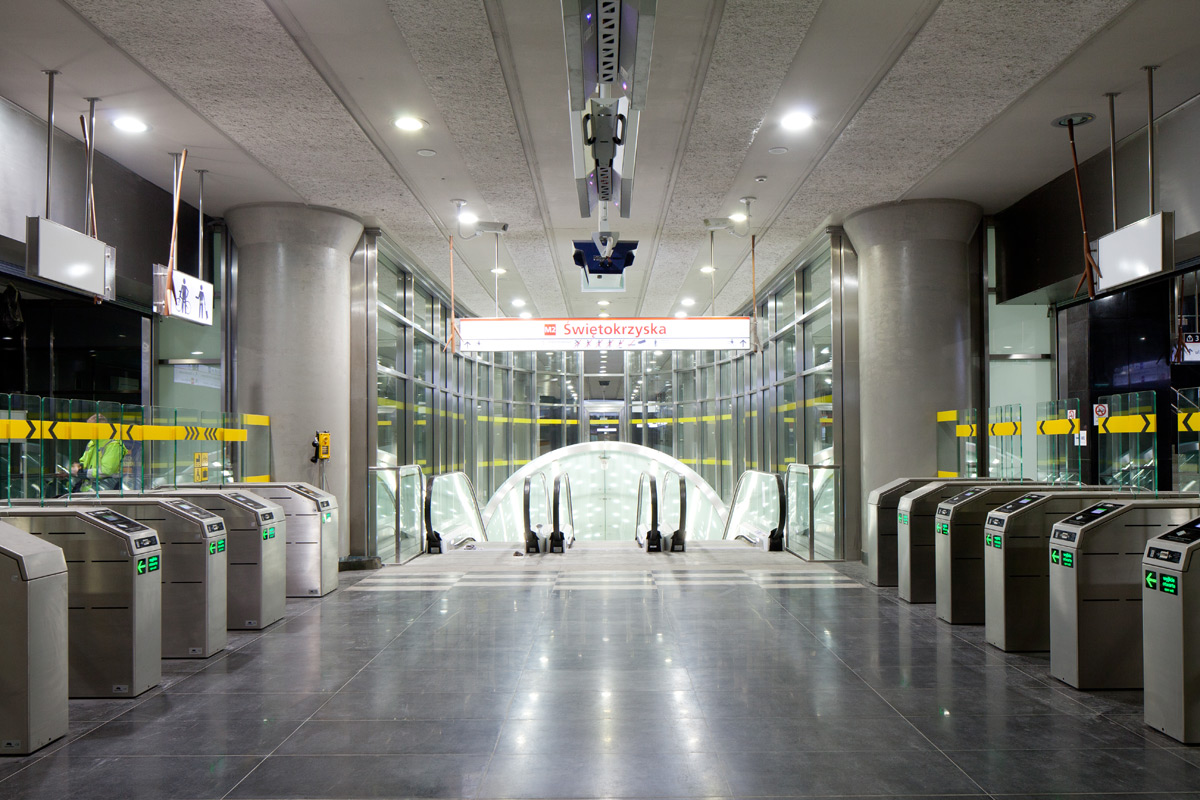
Entrance to the station

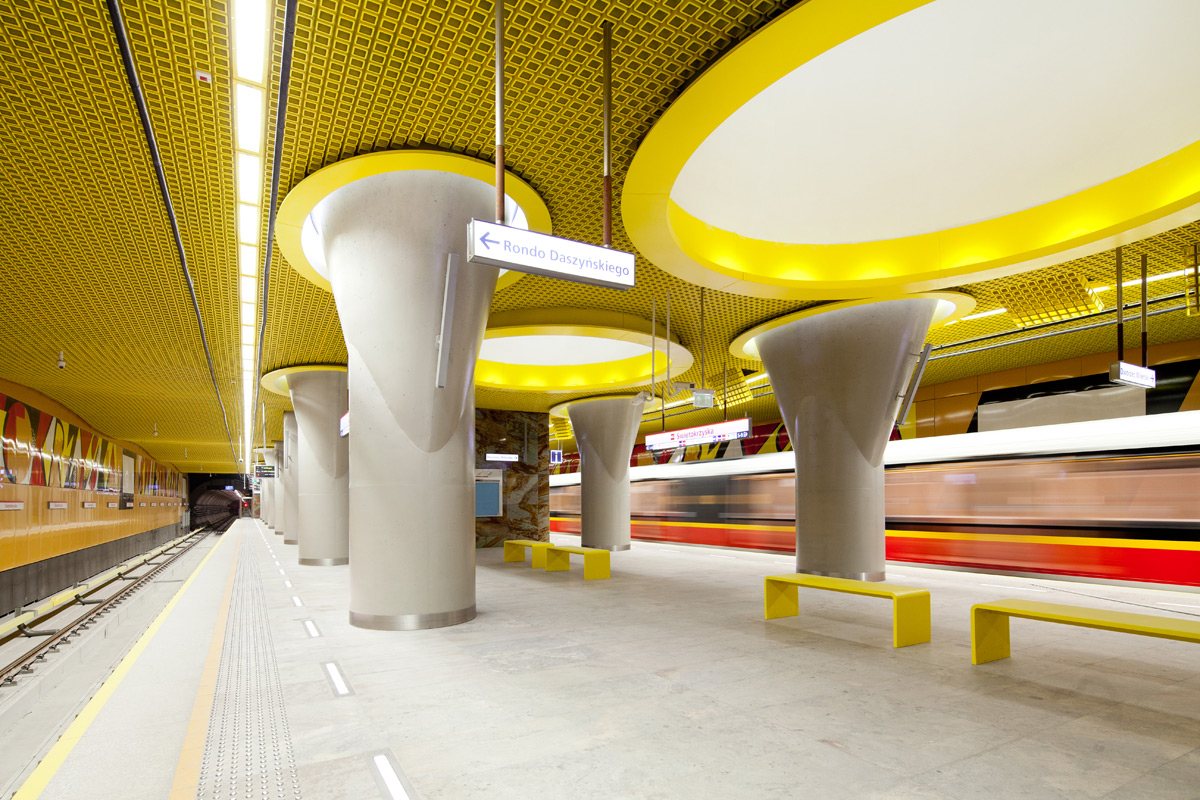
Main platform

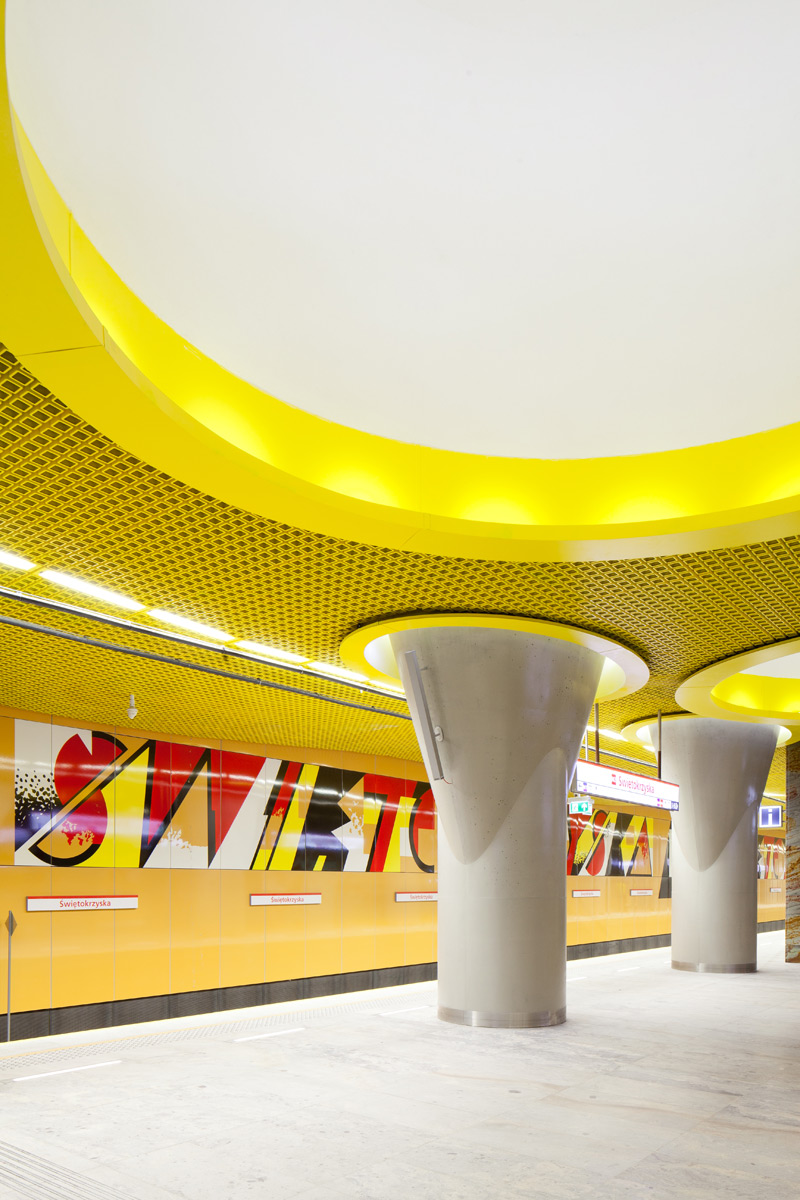
Interior detail, murals designed by Wojciech Fangor

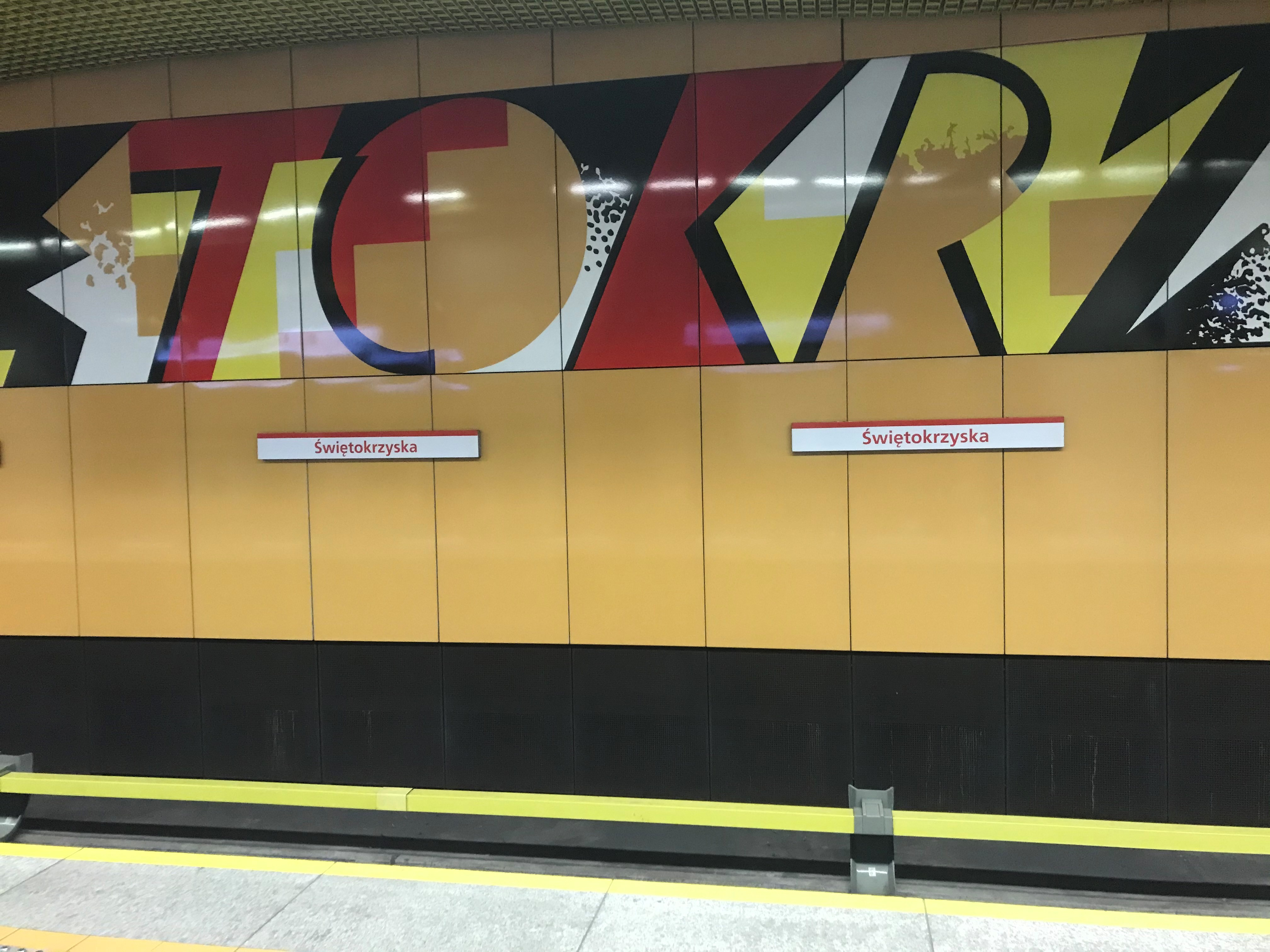
Interior of platform
