= Plac Wilsona metro station =

Warsaw metro station

Plac Wilsona
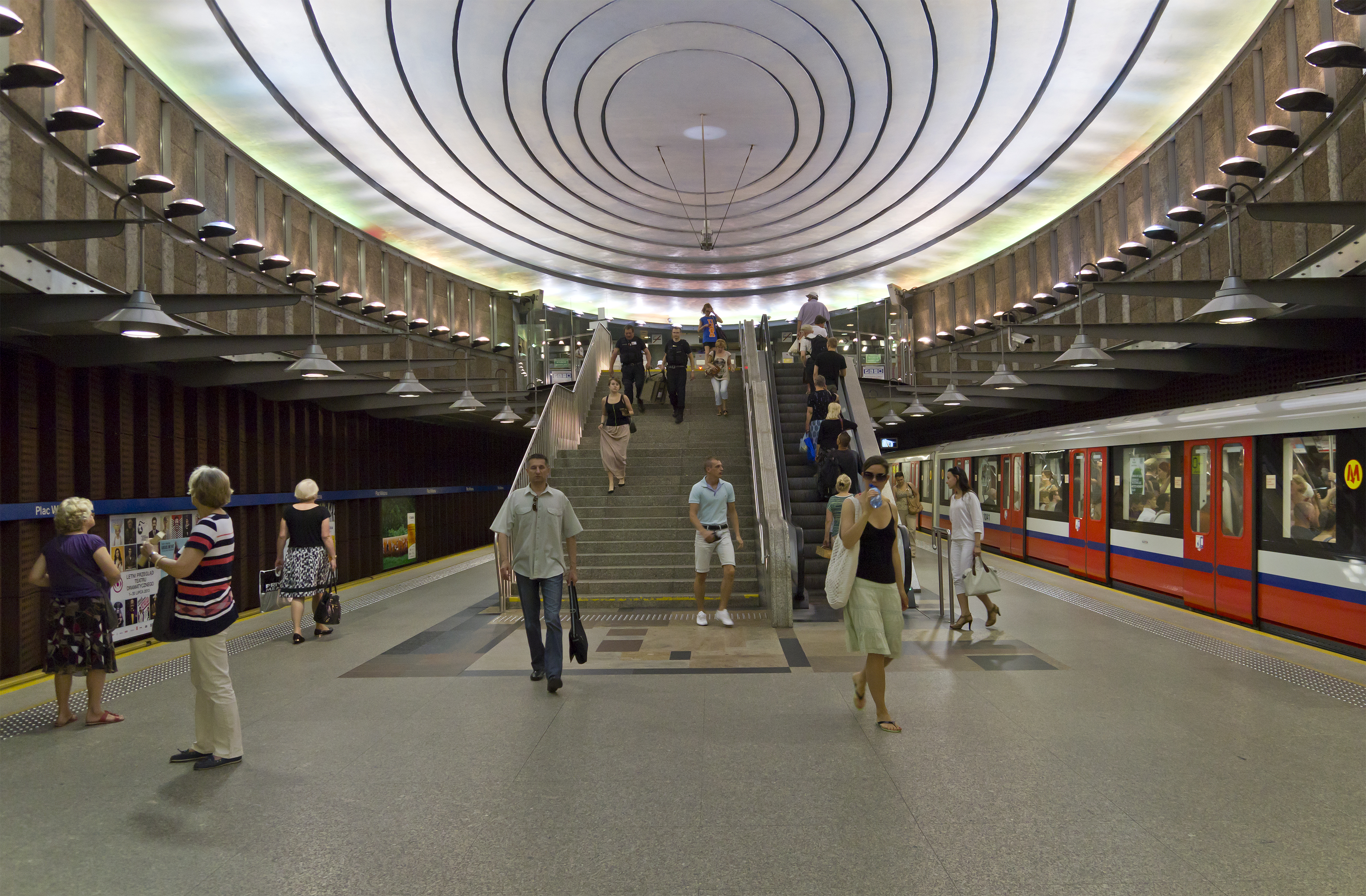

General information
- Coordinates: 52°16′9″N 20°59′3″E
- Owner: Public Transport Authority
- Platforms: 1 island platform
- Tracks: 2
- Connections: 114, 116, 122, 157, 181, 185, 303, 518; N44, N46; 6, 15, 36

Construction
- Structure type: Underground
- Platform levels: 1
- Accessible: Yes

Other information
- Station code: A-18
- Fare zone: 1

History
- Opened: 8 April 2005; 21 years ago

Services
Preceding station	Warsaw Metro	Following station
Marymont towards Młociny	M1 line	Dworzec Gdański towards Kabaty
Location
- Location within Warsaw

Plac Wilsona (English: Wilson Square) is a station on Line M1 of the Warsaw Metro. It is located below Wilson Square in the Żoliborz district in northern Warsaw.

The station was opened on 8 April 2005 as the northern terminus of the extension from Dworzec Gdański. On 29 December 2006 the line was extended further north to Marymont as shuttle service, and on 20 March 2008 as normal service.

On 7 April 2008 during the Metrorail convention it won a Metro award for the best recently constructed station. It was designed by Polish architect Andrzej M. Chołdzyński.

== Gallery ==
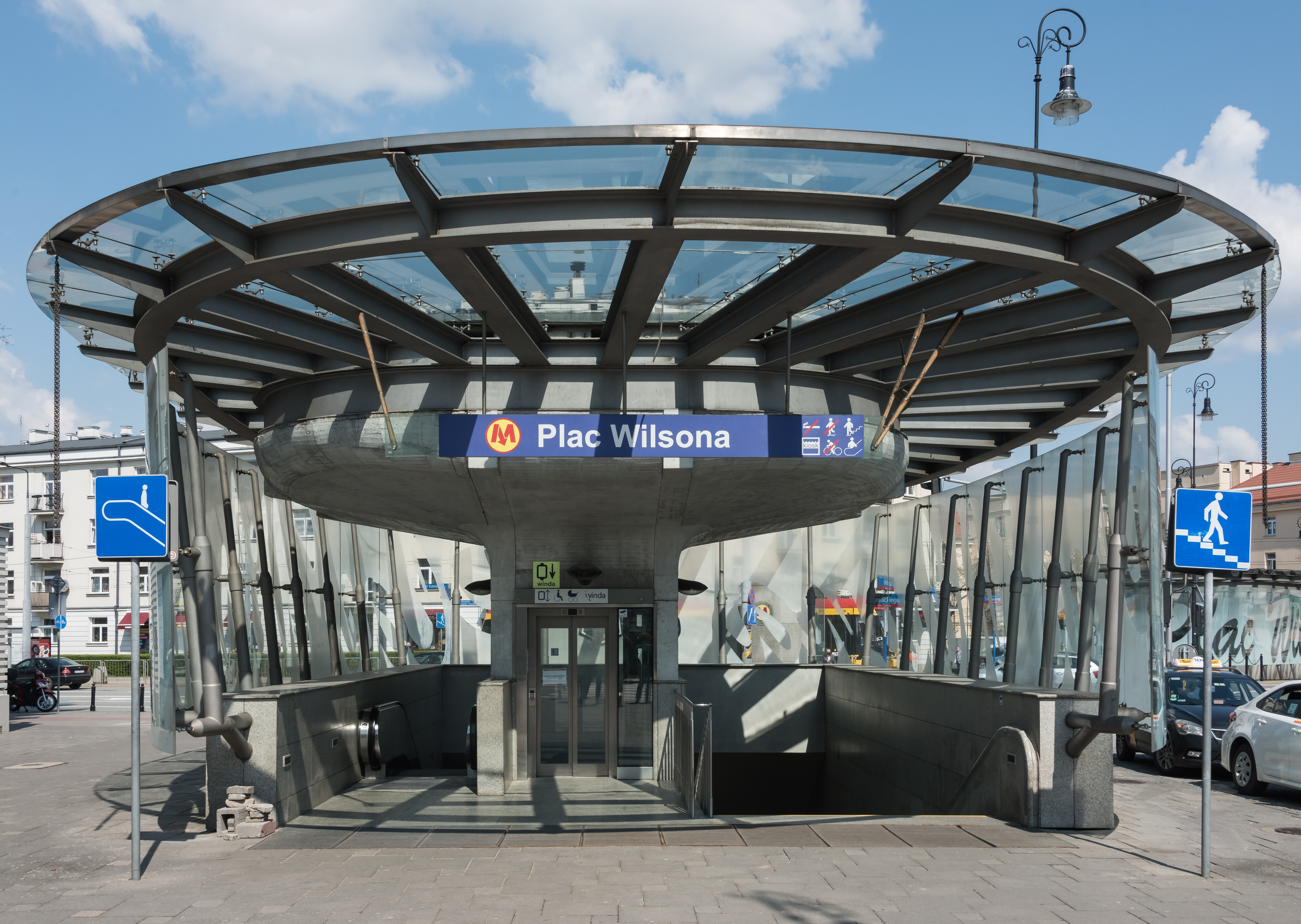
Entrance to the station

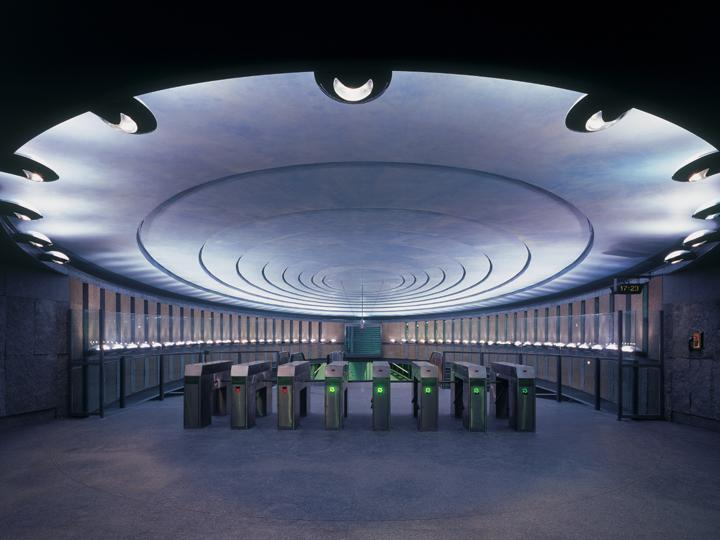
Entrance to the station

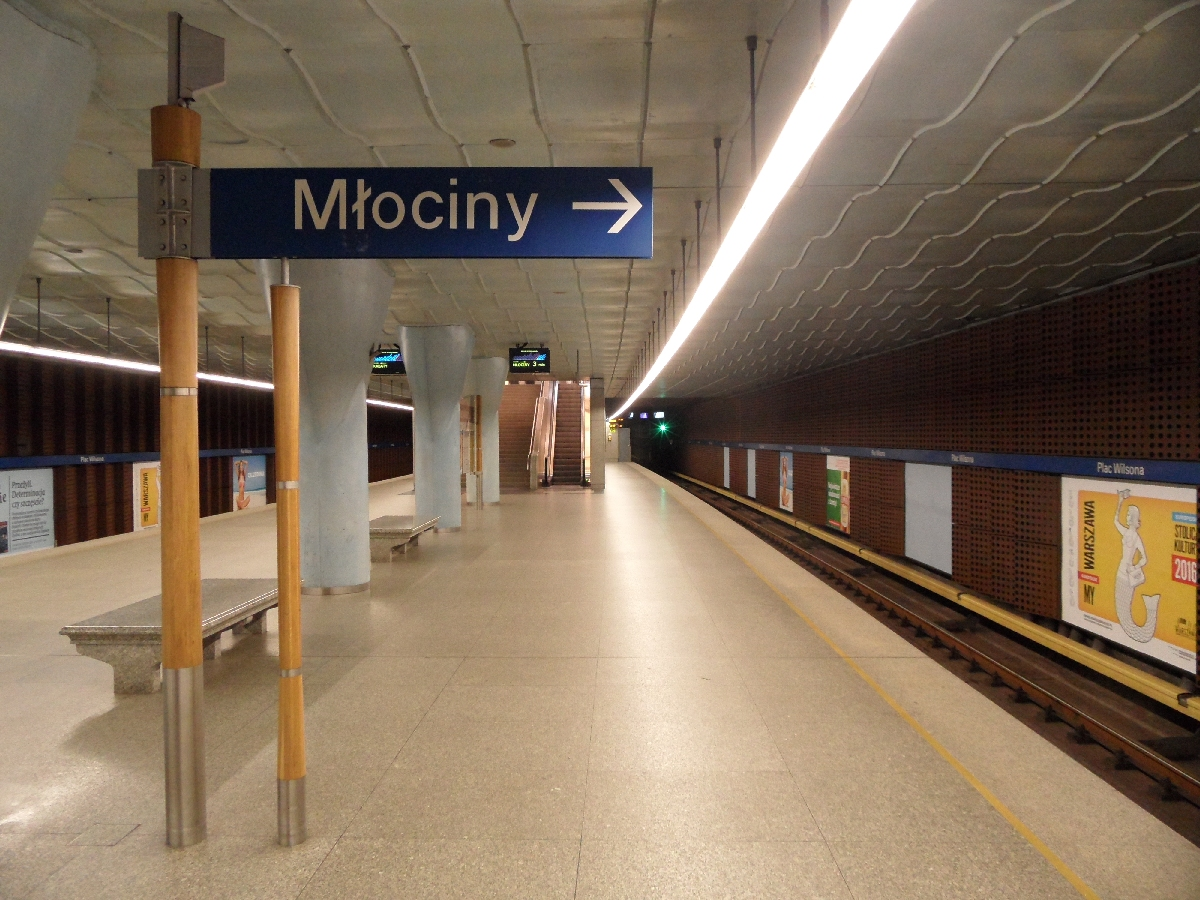
Main platform

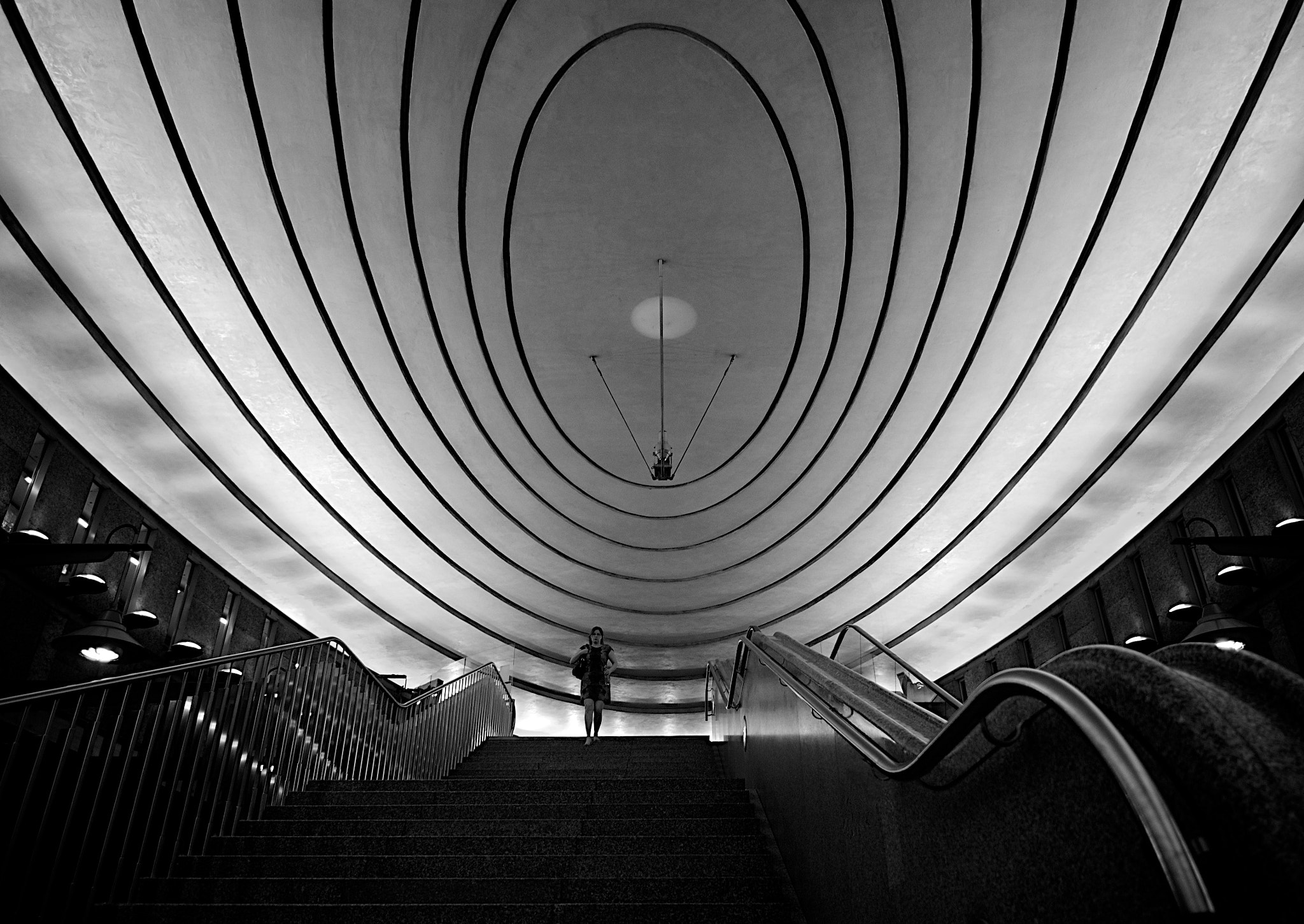
Interior detail

== See also ==
- Plac Wilsona
