= Zebra Tower =

Office building in Warsaw, Poland

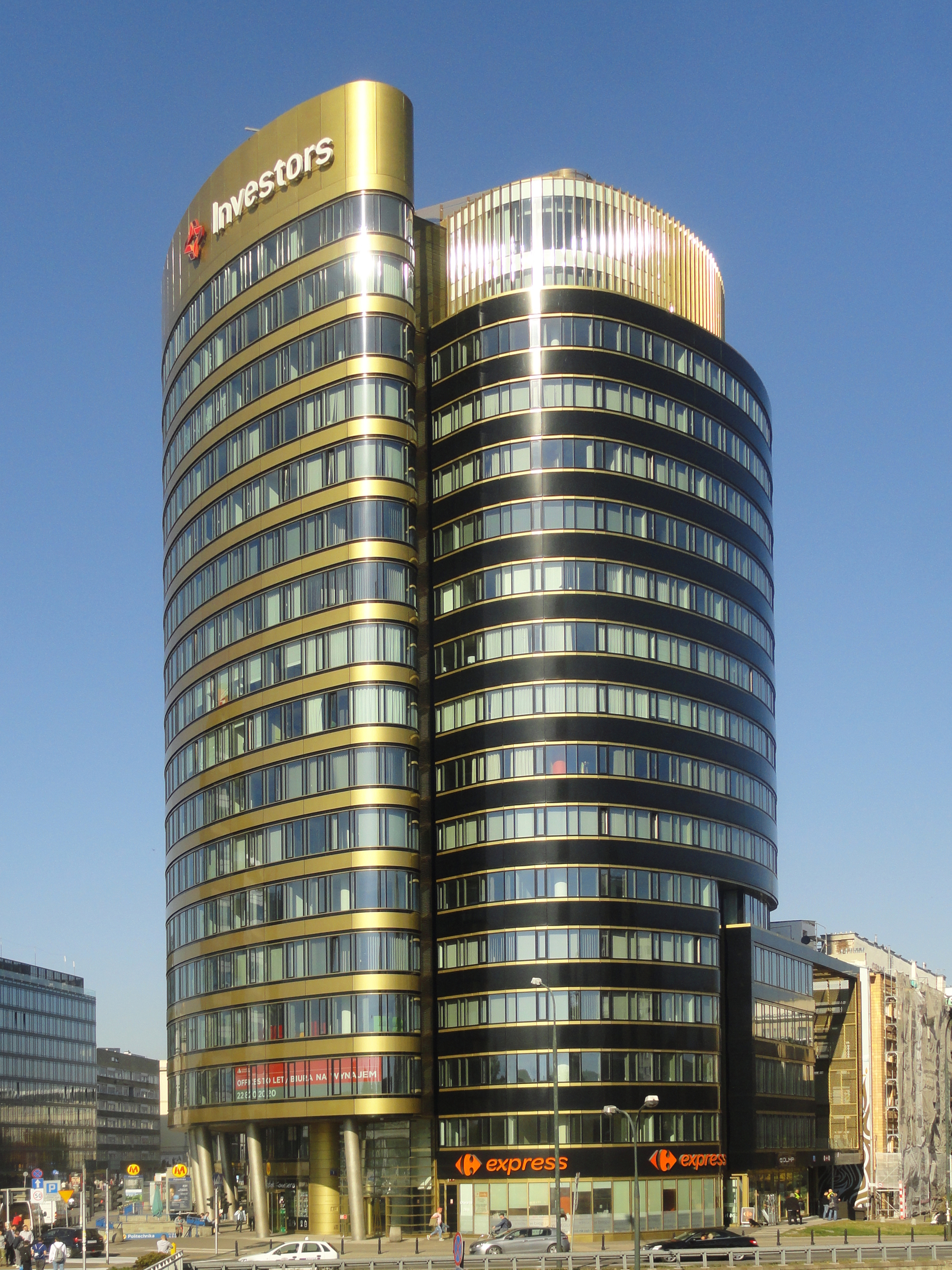
- Zebra Tower in 2018.
- Interactive map of the Zebra Tower area

General information
- Type: Office building
- Location: Warsaw, Poland, 1 Mokotowska Street
- Coordinates: 52°13′03″N 21°00′57″E
- Construction started: September 2008
- Completed: December 2010
- Owner: Union Investment

Height
- Height: 60 m

Technical details
- Floor count: 17
- Floor area: 18,280 m^{2}

Design and construction
- Architects: Martin Tröthan; Piotr Bujnowski
- Developer: S+B Gruppe

Website
- www.zebra-tower.com

Zebra Tower is an office building in Warsaw, Poland, located in the Downtown district, at 1 Mokotowska Street. It was opened in 2010, and, is 17-storeys-tall, and has the total height of 60 m.

== History ==
The building was designed by Martin Tröthan from Hoffmann Architekten firm, and Piotr Bujnowski. It was developed by S+B Gruppe, and constructed by Bilfinger Berger Budownictwo between September 2008 and December 2010. In 2011, it was sold to Union Investment for 76 million euros. It was the largest transaction in the developer's history. The same year, Zebra Tower became the first building in Poland to receive the LEED Gold certificate.

== Characteristics ==
The skyscraper is 17-storeys-tall, and has the total height of 60 m. It has the floor area of 18,280 m².
