= M1 (Warsaw) =

Warsaw Metro line

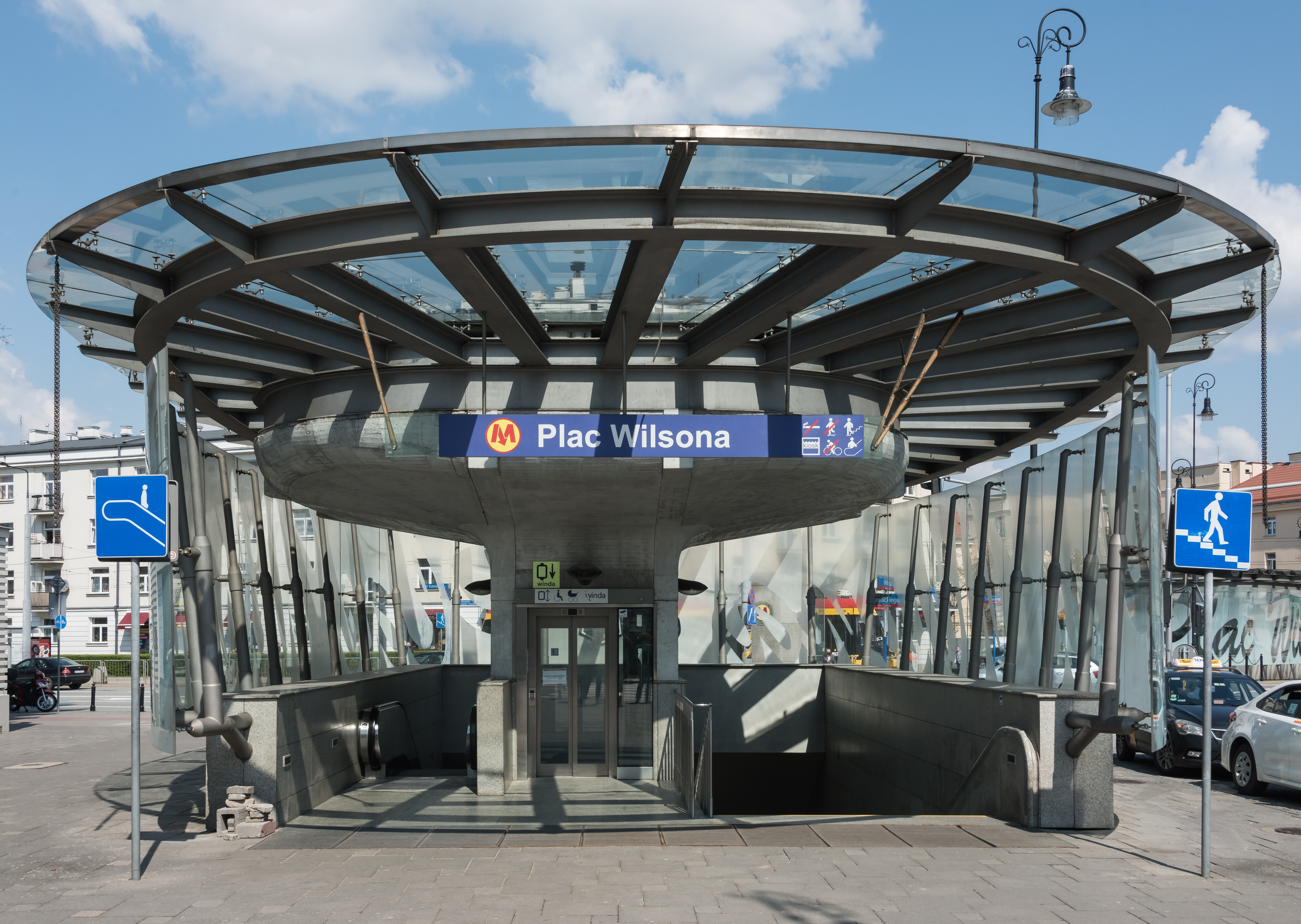
- Entrance to Plac Wilsona station

Overview
- Owner: City of Warsaw
- Locale: Warsaw, Poland
- Termini: Młociny; Kabaty
- Stations: 21; 2 planned
- Website: Metro Warszawskie

Service
- Type: Rapid transit
- System: Warsaw Metro
- Operator(s): Metro Warszawskie
- Rolling stock: Metrovagonmash 81 Series; Alstom Metropolis 98B; Siemens Inspiro; Škoda Varsovia

History
- Opened: 7 April 1995; 31 years ago
- Last extension: 2008

Technical
- Line length: 23.1 km (14.4 mi)
- Number of tracks: Double
- Track gauge: 1,435 mm (4 ft 8 1/2 in) standard gauge
- Electrification: 750 V DC third rail

The M1 line is the first line of the Warsaw Metro. It is 23.1 km (14.4 mi) long, has 21 stations and runs from the Kabaty neighborhood in the Ursynów district to the Młociny district in Bielany.

The decision to build it was made in 1982, and a year later the first works in Ursynów began. In 1995, the first section of the route connecting Ursynów and Mokotów with Śródmieście was launched, and the next sections were put into operation in the following years. In 2008, construction of the Bielany section was completed and crossings on the whole line were started. There is also a plan to add two additional stations around the center portion of the metro line.

M1 trains run from approximately 5:00 am to 12:10 am (from Monday to Thursday and Sunday) and from approximately 5:00 am to 3:00 am (Fridays and Saturdays).

== Current stations ==
Code	Name	Photo	Interchanges	Services	Opened	Location	Coordinates
A01	Kabaty			Veturilo, Bike and Ride, Kiss and Ride	7 April 1995	Ursynów	52°07′55″N 21°03′57″E
A02	Natolin			Veturilo, Bike and Ride	7 April 1995	Ursynów	52°08′24″N 21°03′27″E
A03	Imielin			Veturilo, Park and ride, Bike and Ride	7 April 1995	Ursynów	52°08′59″N 21°02′43″E
A04	Stokłosy			Veturilo, Park and ride, Bike and Ride	7 April 1995	Ursynów	52°09′22″N 21°02′04″E
A05	Ursynów			Veturilo, Park and ride, Bike and Ride	7 April 1995	Ursynów	52°09′43″N 21°01′39″E
A06	Służew			Veturilo, Bike and Ride	7 April 1995	Mokotów	52°10′24″N 21°01′34″E
A07	Wilanowska			Veturilo, Park and ride, Bike and Ride, Kiss and Ride	7 April 1995	Mokotów	52°10′54″N 21°01′23″E
A08	Wierzbno			Veturilo, Bike and Ride	7 April 1995	Mokotów	52°11′25″N 21°01′00″E
A09	Racławicka			Veturilo, Bike and Ride	7 April 1995	Mokotów	52°11′53″N 21°00′46″E
A10	Pole Mokotowskie			Veturilo	7 April 1995	Mokotów	52°12′32″N 21°00′28″E
A11	Politechnika			Veturilo	7 April 1995	Śródmieście	52°13′03″N 21°00′53″E
A13	Centrum		Warszawa Śródmieście railway station Warszawa Centralna railway station	Veturilo	26 May 1998	Śródmieście	52°13′49″N 21°00′38″E
A14	Świętokrzyska		Line M2	Veturilo	11 May 2001	Śródmieście	52°14′07″N 21°00′27″E
A15	Ratusz Arsenał			Veturilo	11 May 2001	Śródmieście	52°14′41″N 21°00′05″E
A17	Dworzec Gdański		Warszawa Gdańska station	Veturilo, Bike and Ride, Kiss and Ride	20 December 2003	Śródmieście	52°15′30″N 20°59′40″E
A18	Plac Wilsona			Veturilo	8 April 2005	Żoliborz	52°16′09″N 20°59′04″E
A19	Marymont			Veturilo, Park and ride, Bike and Ride	29 December 2006	Żoliborz	52°16′18″N 20°58′18″E
A20	Słodowiec			Veturilo, Kiss and Ride	23 April 2008	Bielany	52°16′37″N 20°57′36″E
A21	Stare Bielany			Veturilo	25 October 2008	Bielany	52°16′53″N 20°57′00″E
A22	Wawrzyszew			Veturilo, Park and ride, Bike and Ride	25 October 2008	Bielany	52°17′11″N 20°56′22″E
A23	Młociny			Veturilo, Park and ride, Bike and Ride, Kiss and Ride	25 October 2008	Bielany	52°17′25″N 20°55′45″E

== Future stations ==
Park and Ride locations in Warsaw

Code	Name	Line	Date	Status	Coordinates
A12	Plac Konstytucji	Line M1	by 2050	planned	52°13′31″N 21°00′51″E
A16	Muranów	Line M1	by 2050	planned	52°15′00″N 20°59′56″E

== Rolling stock ==
Rolling stock	Year	Cars	Trains
81-717.3/714.3	1989	6	1
Alstom Metropolis 98B	2000–2002, 2004–2005	108	18
Siemens Inspiro	2013–2014	90	15
Škoda Varsovia	2022–2023	222	37
Total		426	71

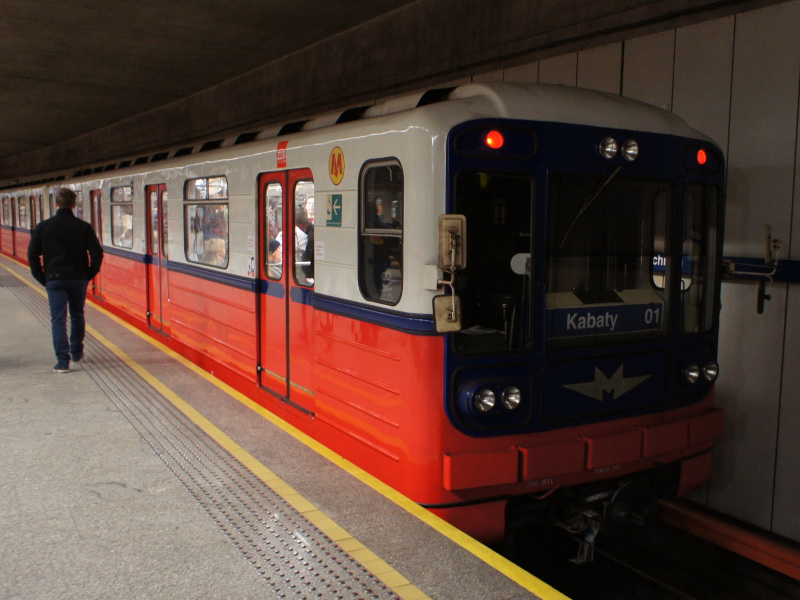
81-717.3/714.3

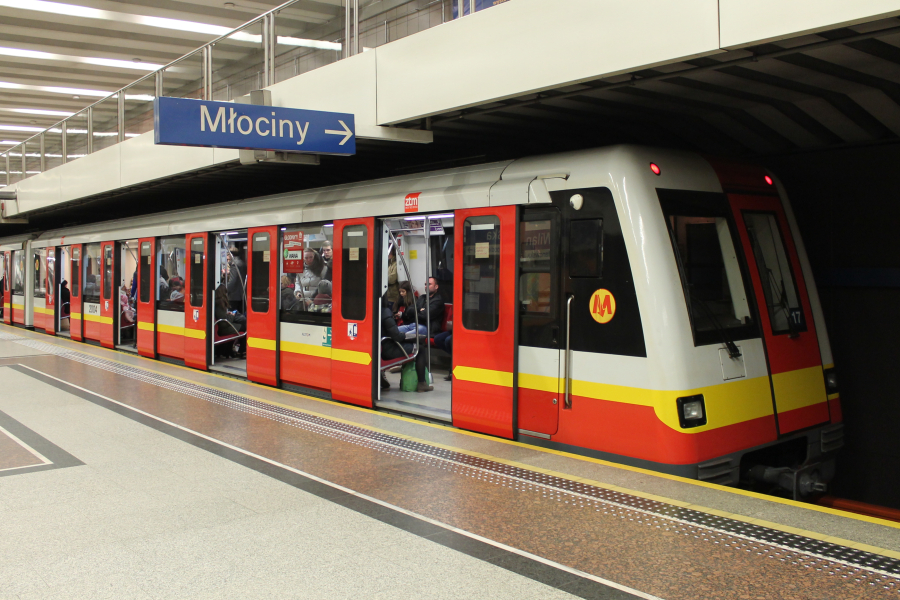
Alstom Metropolis 98B

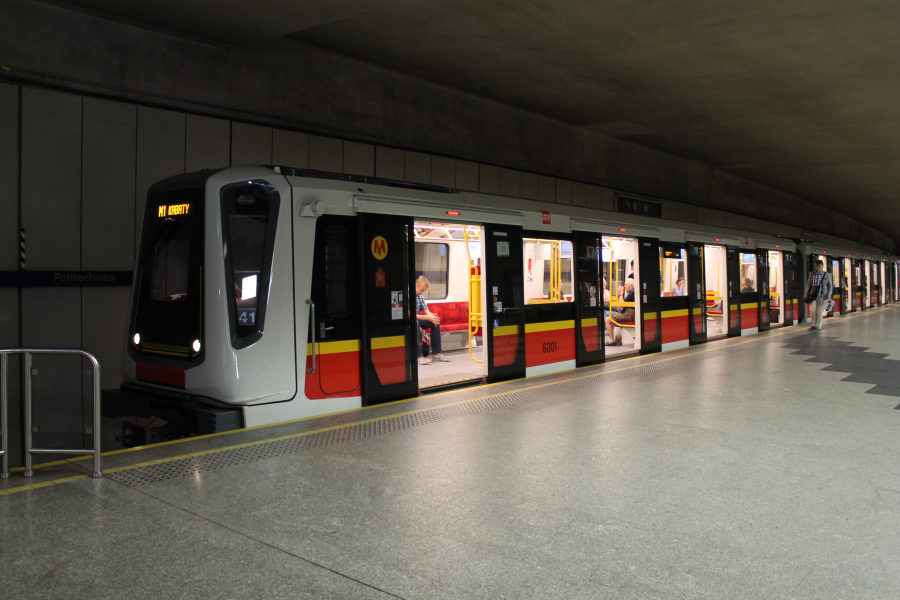
Siemens Inspiro

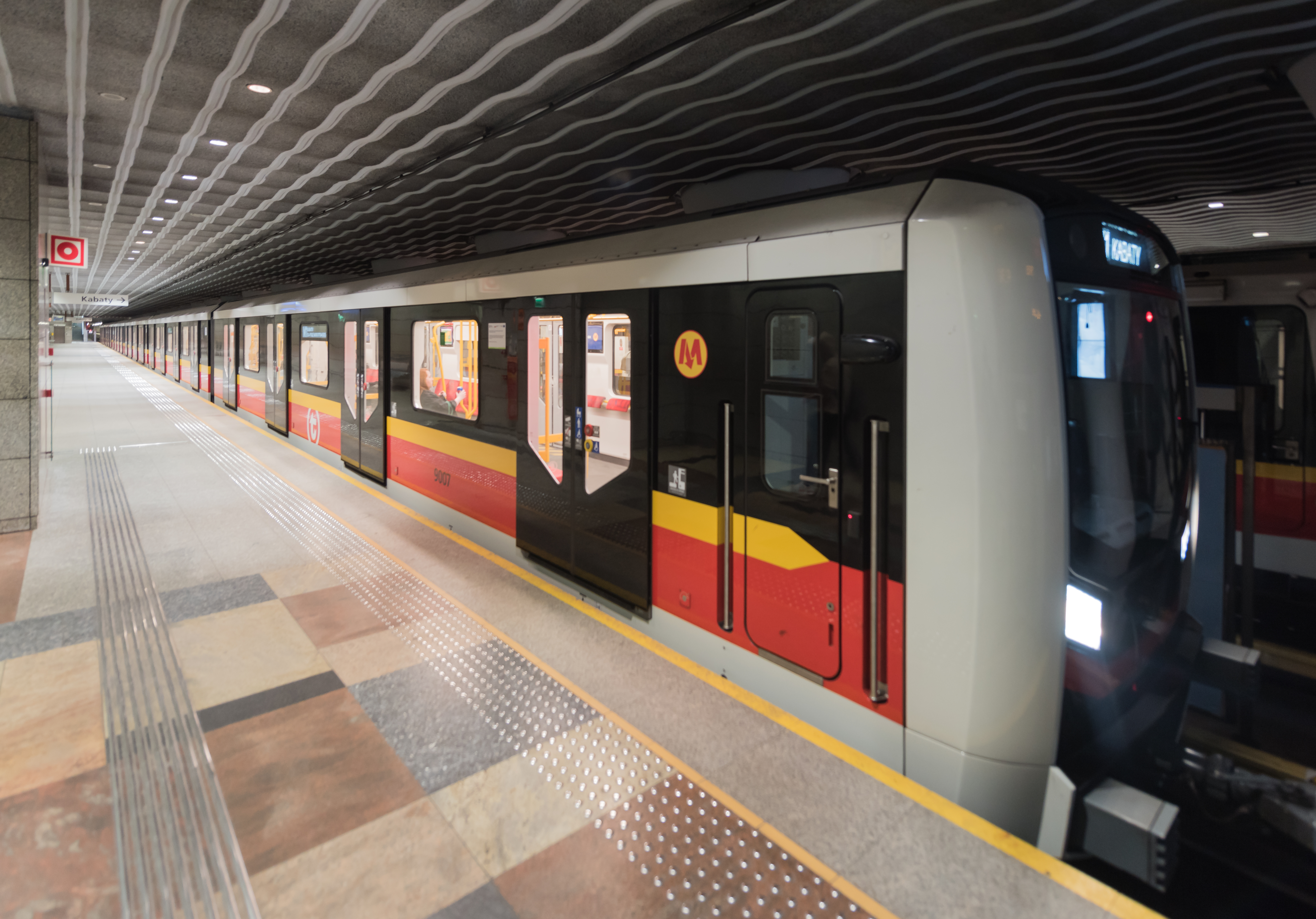
Škoda Varsovia

The line used to be operated by 81-series trains. These sets were retired in 2023. One 6-car set (Number 02) was kept as a heritage unit.

== Depots ==
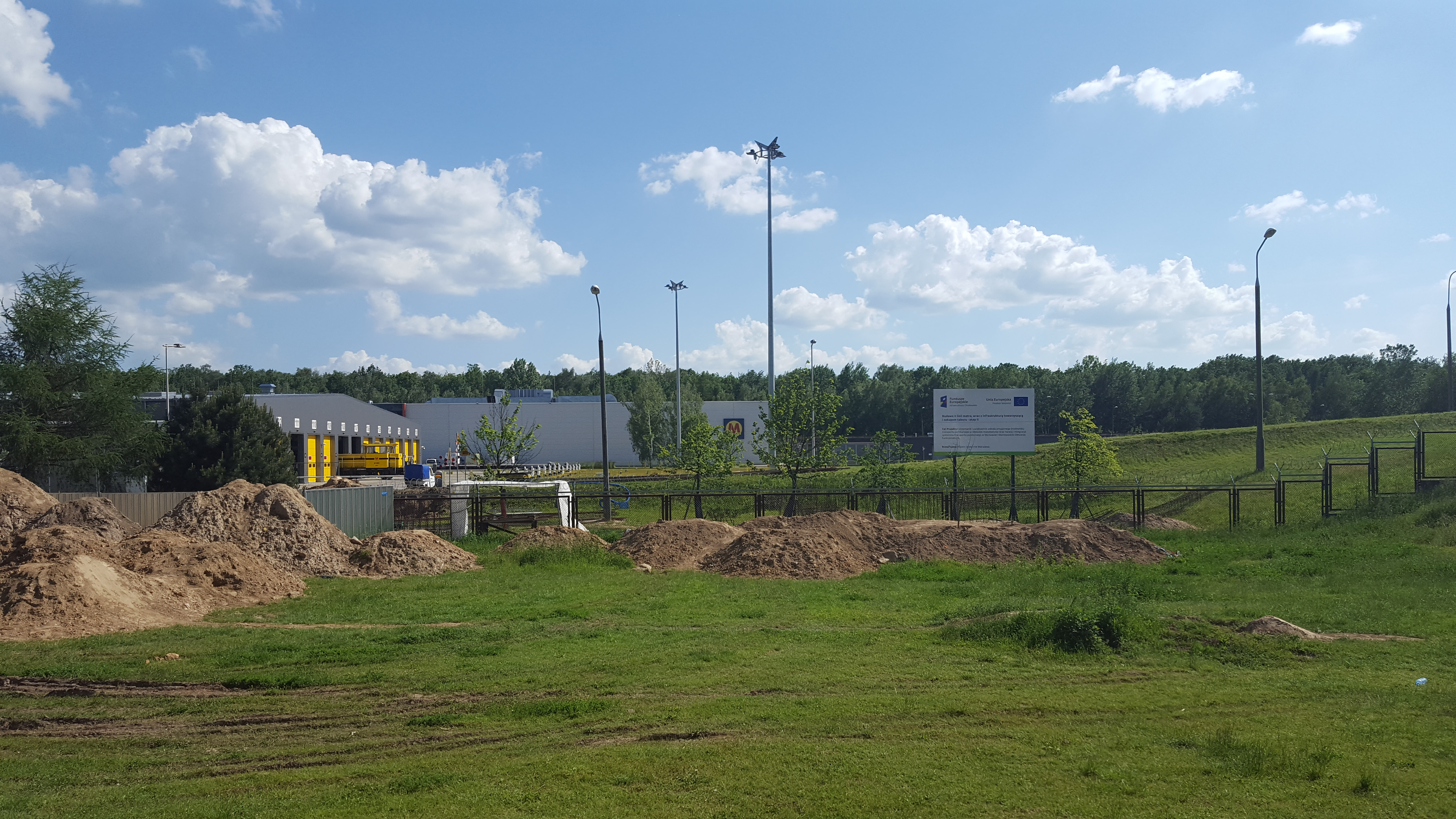
The Kabaty Depot

A single depot, Kabaty Technical and Storage Station (Polish: Stacja Techniczno-Postojowa Kabaty, STP Kabaty), is located south of the Kabaty station. This depot is used, among others, for repairing, maintaining, and testing metro trains. As of 2020, the depot itself employed around 500 people. It is situated in the Kabaty neighborhood of the Ursynów district in southern Warsaw, at the terminus of National Education Commission Avenue (Aleja Komisji Edukacji Narodowej), the main thoroughfare of Ursynów. It also serves as the headquarters of the Metro. The station is adjacent to the Kabaty Forest to the south.

The depot was opened on 7 April 1995 as the depot of the M1 metro line. It is connected to the Polish national railway network via Warszawa Okęcie railway station by the unelectrified, single-track spur PKP rail line 937.
