= Warsaw Public Transport Authority =

Local government body managing public transport in Warsaw, Poland

- Zarząd Transportu Miejskiego w Warszawie
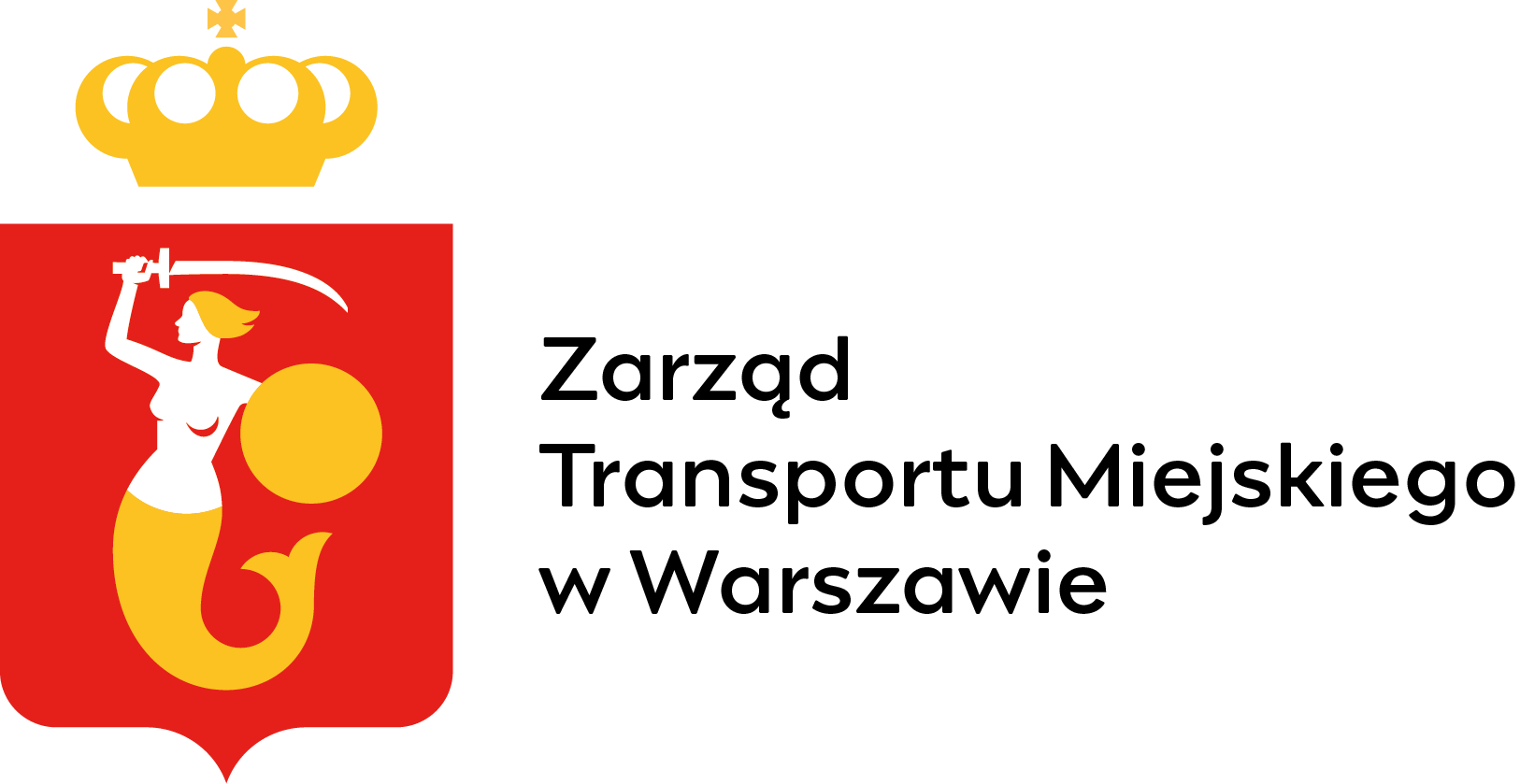

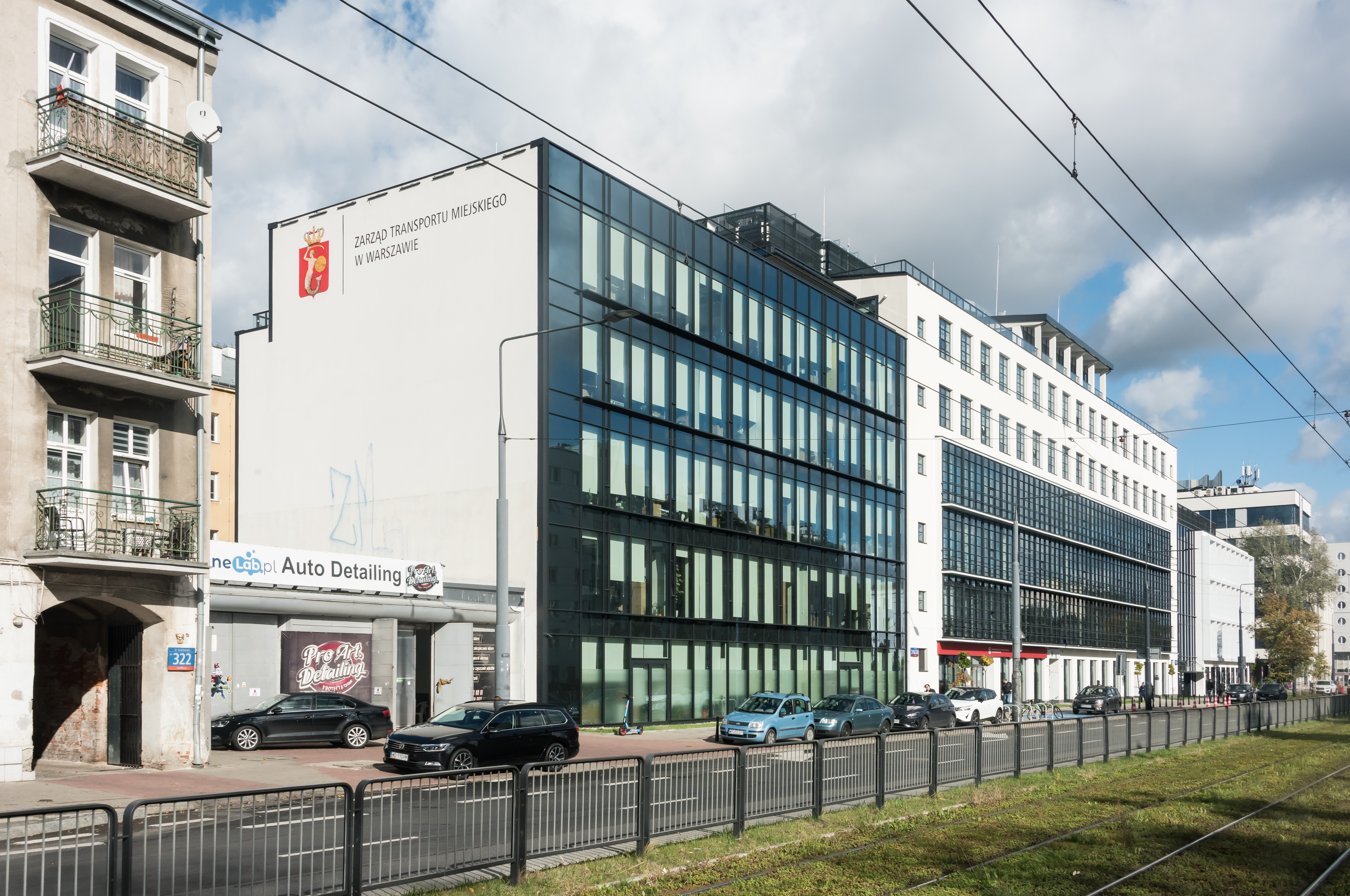
- ZTM headquarters
- Abbreviation: ZTM
- Formation: 1 January 1992
- Founder: Warsaw City Council
- Type: local transport authority
- Headquarters: Grochowska Street 316/320; Warsaw, Poland
- Region served: Warsaw metropolitan area
- Services: Warsaw Public Transport
- Executive: Katarzyna Strzegowska
- Website: ztm.waw.pl

The Warsaw Public Transport Authority (Polish: Zarząd Transportu Miejskiego w Warszawie, (Note: lit. 'City Transport Management in Warsaw'.) ZTM) is a local government body organising public transport in Warsaw and surrounding metropolitan area. Services managed by the Authority are corporately branded as Warszawski Transport Publiczny (meaning 'Warsaw Public Transport'; abbreviated to WTP). These include: bus and tram networks, two metro lines, Rapid Urban Railway (Warsaw) (Note: Rapid Urban Railway (Warsaw) (lit. 'fast urban railway') is a mixed rapid transit and commuter rail.) trains and park-and-ride car parks.

The Authority is in charge of a unified fare system, timetable scheduling, route planning and public transport development plans. Transport operations themselves are performed by municipal and privately owned, contracted companies.

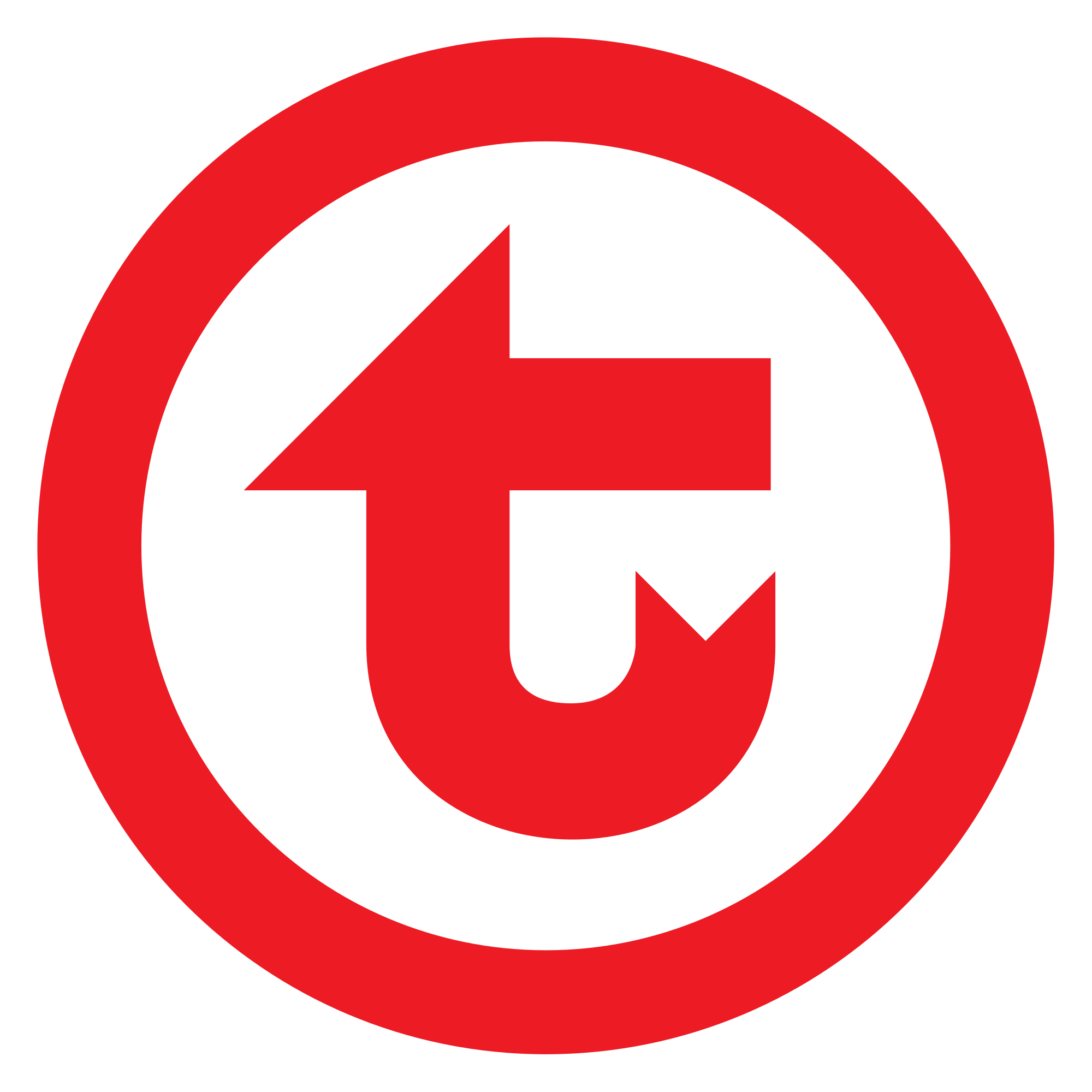
Warsaw Public Transport logo

== Operations ==
=== Metro ===
Warsaw metro is an underground rapid transit consisting of two lines: north-south M1 line and west-east M2 line. Lines intersect in city center at the Świętokrzyska station. The first section of the route was opened in 1995. Most recently constructed east extension of M2 line with three stations was opened in September 2022. Further west extension of the line is under construction. Line M3 is planned and other two routes were announced by the Mayor of Warsaw in February 2023.

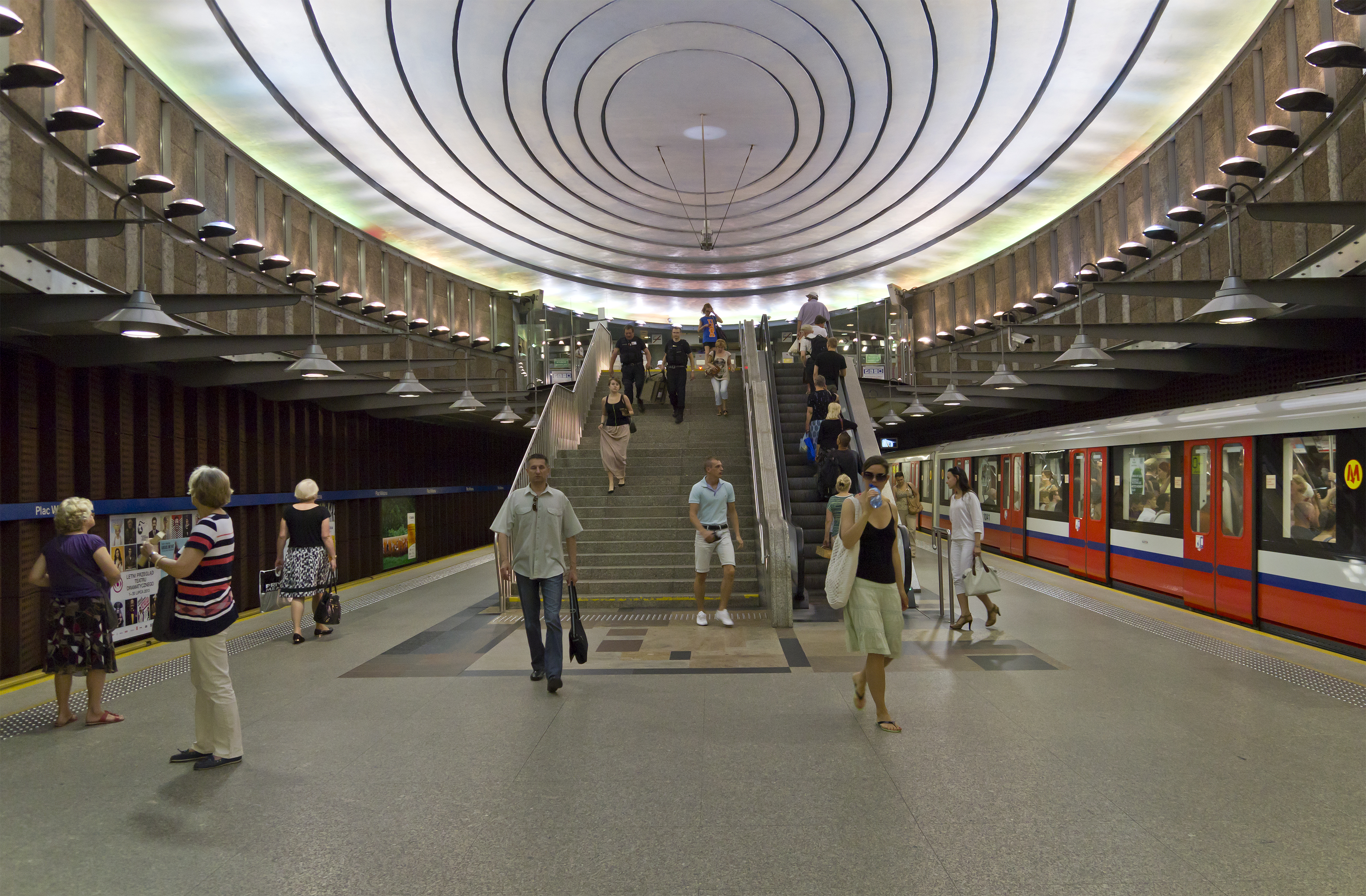
Plac Wilsona station on M1 line

=== Rapid Urban Railway ===
The Rapid Urban Railway (SKM) is mixed rapid transit and commuter rail network of five lines connecting Warsaw with its suburbs and satellite cities including Pruszków, Legionowo, Radzymin, Sulejówek, Otwock and since 12 March 2023 also Piaseczno. SKM trains are all electric multiple units running on shared with other rail traffic main rail lines. Routes of SKM are marked with a letter 'S' followed by a number.

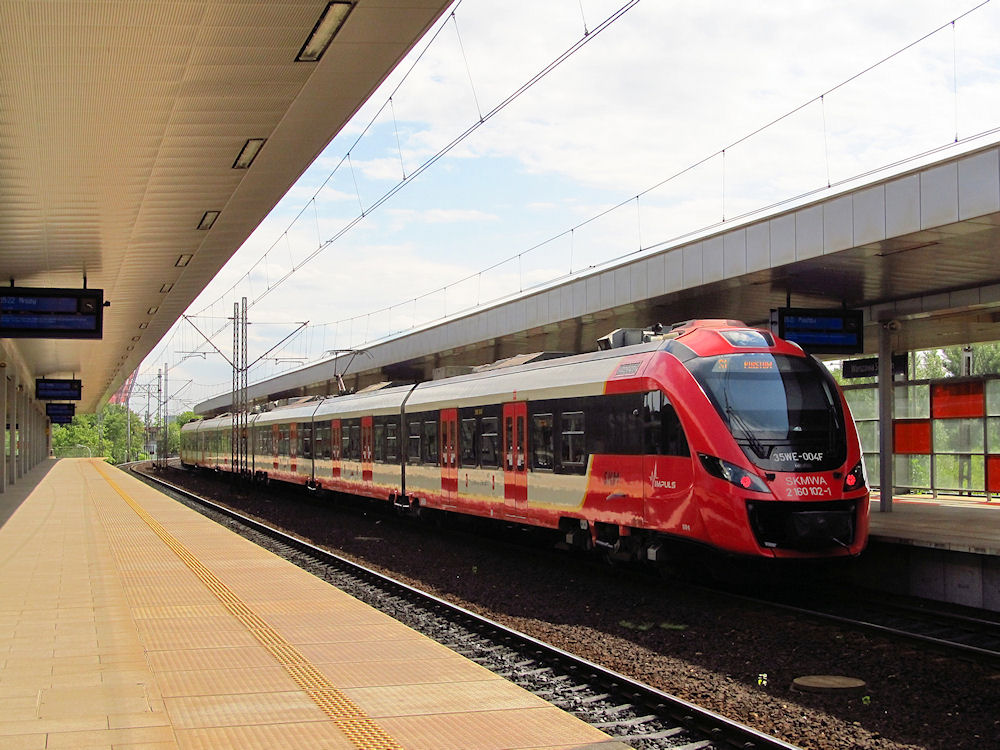
SKM S1 line train at Warszawa Stadion railway station

=== Trams ===
Warsaw tram network consists of 24 regular lines operating on 303 kilometres (188 mi) (Note: Figure holds for the length of single track as given in the source. The majority of the tram network consists of double track.) of tram tracks. Electric trams of which about half are low-floor cars are powered through an overhead wires. Currently three network development projects are under construction – new tram depot in the Annopol neighbourhood, route to Wilanów and route along the Kasprzaka Street. Trams stop at all stops along their routes. Tram lines are marked with one- or two-digit number.

=== Buses ===
The city's bus network consists of regular, fast and express services operating during the day-time within the boundaries of fare Zone 1 and inter-zonal, night-time and local lines. On some of the routes, buses do not stop at all stops or some of them are on-request.

=== Contractors ===
Network	Operator	Ownership Owner
Metro	Metro Warszawskie Sp. z o.o.	municipal Capital City of Warsaw
Rapid Urban Railway (Warsaw)	Rapid Urban Railway (Warsaw) Sp. z o.o.	municipal Capital City of Warsaw
Trams	Tramwaje Warszawskie Sp. z o.o.	municipal Capital City of Warsaw
Buses	Miejskie Zakłady Autobusowe Sp. z o.o.	municipal Capital City of Warsaw
Buses	Komunikacja Miejska Łomianki Sp. z o.o.	municipal Łomianki Commune
Buses	Relobus Transport Polska Sp. z o.o.	private
Buses	Mobilis Sp. z o.o.	private Egged
Buses	PKS w Grodzisku Mazowieckim Sp. z o.o.	shared
Buses	other minor operators on local lines	

== Fares ==
Fare structure of Warsaw Public Transport, commonly referred to as 'the ZTM fares' or 'ZTM tickets', is unified and regulated by the Public Transport Authority. Tickets issued by the ZTM entitle to journeys by city buses, trams, metro or rapid urban trains within two fare zones - Zone 1 covering the area of Warsaw and communes of Łomianki, Marki and Konstancin-Jeziorna, and Zone 2 consisting of other surrounding communes of metropolitan area. Additionally, selected tickets are valid on local bus lines and trains of regional operator Masovian Railways and suburban operator Warsaw Commuter Railway (see § ZTM-KM-WKD integrated ticket).

=== Types ===
Single fare, time-limit and short-term tickets
Type	Ticket	Fare (PLN)		Valid within			
Type	Ticket	regular	reduced (50%)	Zone 1	Zone 2	ZTM-KM-WKD integrated ticket offer	Local bus lines
Time-limit	20 minute ticket	3.40	1.70	Yes	Yes	No	No
Single fare or time-limit	Single-fare 75 minute ticket	4.40	2.20	Yes	No	No	No
Single fare or time-limit	Single-fare 90 minute ticket	7	3.50	Yes	Yes	No	No
Single fare or time-limit	Single-fare 75 minute group ticket (up to 10 people)	—N/a	22	Yes	No	No	No
Short-term	One-day ticket (24h)	15	7.50	Yes	No	Yes	Yes
Short-term	One-day ticket (24h)	26	13	Yes	Yes	Yes	Yes
Short-term	3-day ticket (72h)	36	18	Yes	No	Yes	Yes
Short-term	3-day ticket (72h)	57	28.50	Yes	Yes	Yes	Yes
Short-term	Weekend ticket (from 7:00 PM on Friday till 8:00 AM on Monday)	24	12	Yes	Yes	Yes	Yes
Short-term	Group Weekend ticket (from 7:00 PM on Friday till 8:00 AM on Monday; up to 5 people)	40	—N/a	Yes	Yes	Yes	Yes
Exceptions: A: Valid on KM airport transfer RL line between the Warsaw Chopin Airport and Warszawa Płudy stations. Fares as of 30 March 2023. Source:

=== ZTM-KM-WKD integrated ticket ===
As a result of an agreement between ZTM, Masovian Railways and Warsaw Commuter Railway selected ZTM tickets are valid on KM and WKD trains on sections of routes within area loosely corresponding to the ZTM fare zones.

== Executives ==
Name	In office		Ref.
Name	from	to	Ref.
Kazimierz Kulig	1 November 1992	20 February 2000	
Bogdan Botar (Acting executive)	?	12 June 2000	
Przemysław Prądzyński	13 June 2000	3 March 2003	
Robert Czapla	April 2003	5 December 2006	
Leszek Ruta	11 December 2006	July 2013	
Andrzej Franków (Acting executive)	?	?	
Wiesław Witek	December 2013	October 2020	
Katarzyna Strzegowska	October 2020	Incumbent	
