= Kabaty metro station =

Warsaw metro station

Kabaty
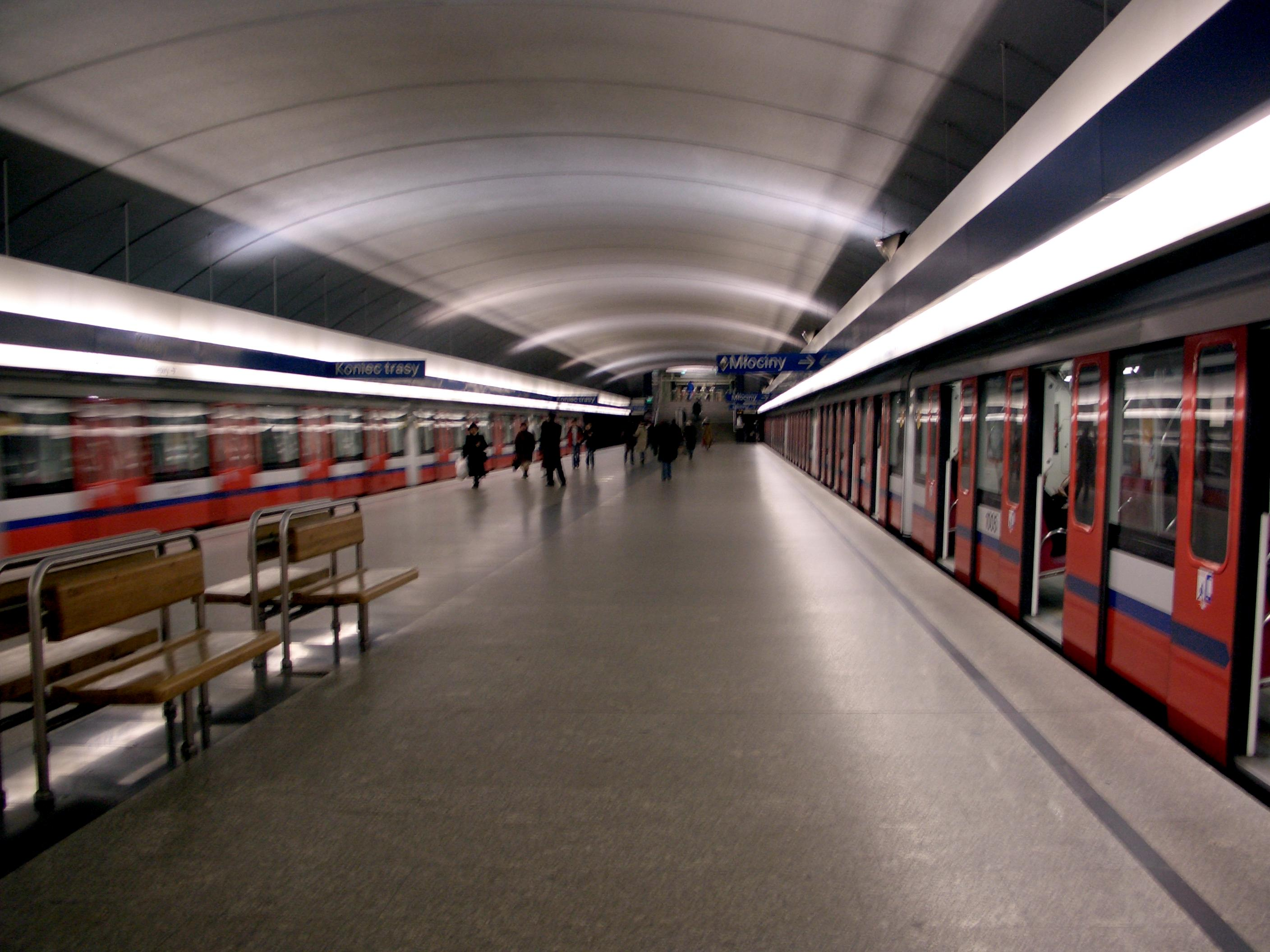

General information
- Coordinates: 52°7′55″N 21°3′54″E
- Owner: Public Transport Authority
- Platforms: 1 island platform
- Tracks: 2
- Connections: 139, 166, 179, 192, 239, 504, 710, 724, 742; N34, N37, N86

Construction
- Structure type: Underground
- Platform levels: 1
- Accessible: Yes

Other information
- Station code: A-1
- Fare zone: 1

History
- Opened: 7 April 1995; 31 years ago

Services
Preceding station	Warsaw Metro	Following station
Natolin towards Młociny	M1 line	Terminus
Location
- Location within Warsaw

Metro Kabaty is the southern terminus of Line M1 of the Warsaw Metro, located in the Kabaty neighbourhood of the Ursynów district in the south of Warsaw, at the end of Aleja Komisji Edukacji Narodowej, the main artery of Ursynów. Tracks continue beyond the station, where they rise to surface level and go into the STP Kabaty depot.

== History ==
The name of the station was chosen by the on 16 December 1983.

The station was opened on 7 April 1995 as the southern terminus of the inaugural stretch of the Warsaw Metro, between Kabaty and Politechnika.

== Description ==
The station is located at the end of Aleja Komisji Edukacji Narodowej, at an intersection with Wąwozowa street. There are exits from the metro on every corner of the intersection, as well as four more exits further up Aleja KEN, to a total of eight exits, as with most M1 stations. There are several bus stops as well as a bus terminus nearby. The Kabaty Forest is within walking distance.

The station has one platform, with tracks on each side. It has an arched ceiling. There are no pillars, and the station is one-level. The whole station maintains a blue-gray-white colour palette.

The station is equipped with a defibrillator, like all Warsaw Metro stations.

Each entrance to the station is equipped with thick steel doors to be potentially used as a civilian shelter.

=== Technical data ===
- Station length: 120 m
- Platform width: 10 m
- Surface area: 14 250 m²
- Cubic area: 59 600 m³
