= Młociny metro station =

Warsaw metro station

Młociny
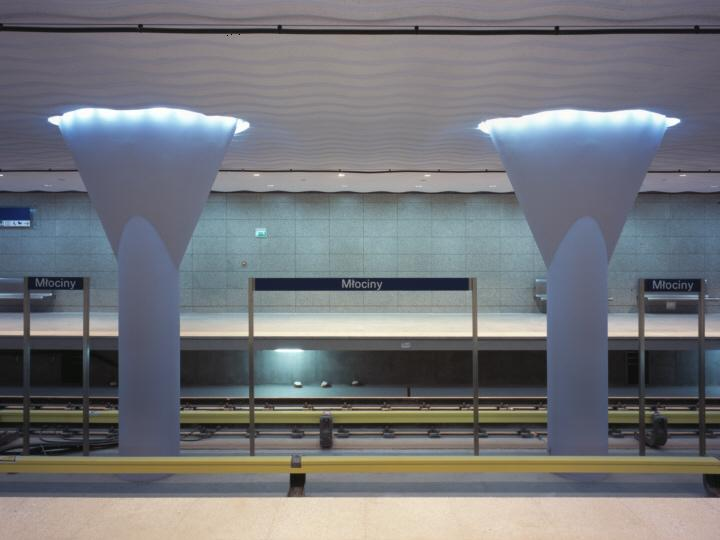

General information
- Coordinates: 52°17′28″N 20°55′44″E
- Owner: Public Transport Authority
- Platforms: 2 side platforms
- Tracks: 2
- Connections: 103, 114, 150, 156, 184, 203, 210, 250, 409, 511, 712, 750, 800; N01, N02, N41, N44, N46, N56, N58; 2, 6, 26, 33

Construction
- Structure type: Underground
- Depth: 7.3 m (24 ft)
- Platform levels: 1
- Parking: 2 park-and-ride car parks
- Accessible: Yes
- Architect: Andrzej M. Chołdzyński

Other information
- Station code: A23
- Fare zone: 1

History
- Opened: 25 October 2008; 17 years ago

Services
Preceding station	Warsaw Metro	Following station
Terminus	M1 line	Wawrzyszew towards Kabaty
Location
- Location within Warsaw

Młociny is a Warsaw Metro station serving as a northern terminus to Line M1. It is situated within Warsaw administrative boundaries and Public Transport Authority's ticketing zone 1, in the osiedle Młociny of the dzielnica Bielany, in a close proximity to Warsaw's ArcelorMittal steelworks. The station opened on 25 October 2008 and is the final northern extension of Line M1. It was designed by Polish architect Andrzej M. Chołdzyński.

The area beyond the station has been remodelled into a major public transportation junction after Młociny opened. It is served by trams and both urban and suburban buses. Although there are no plans to extend Line M1 further, the station is built in such way that it will be possible to do so if need be.

The trains are turned back at sidings behind Młociny. Terminating trains arrive at eastern side platform, whereas southbound trains depart from western side platform.

== Gallery ==
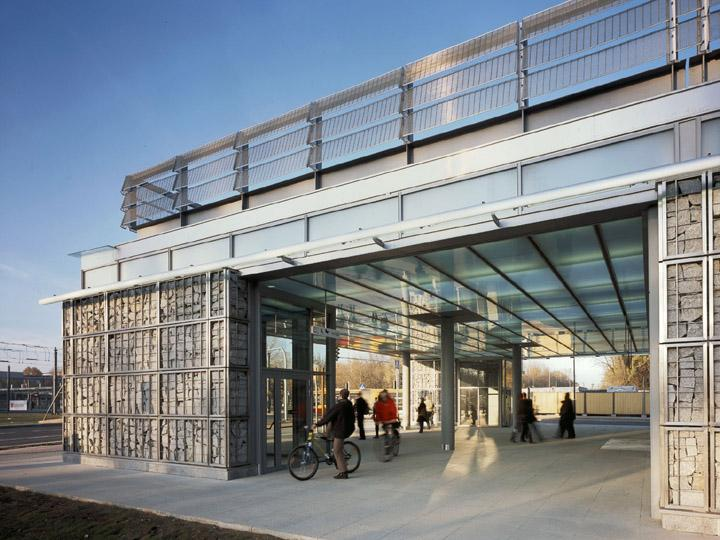
Entrance to the station

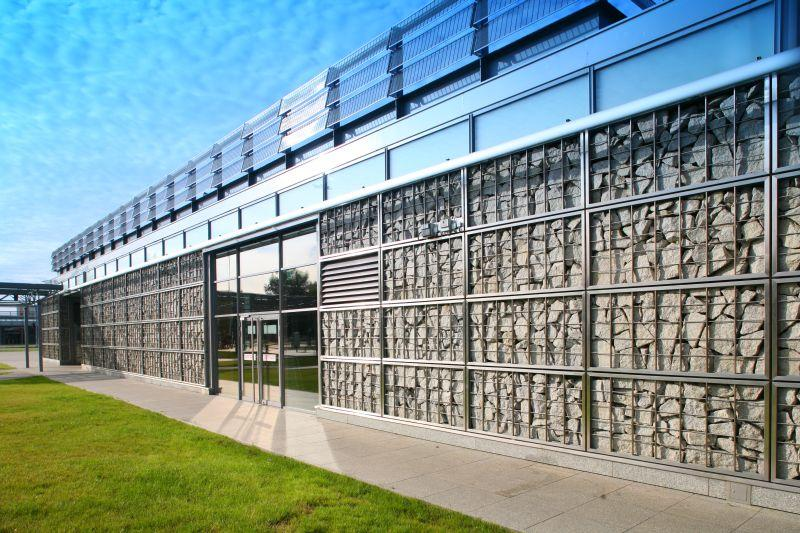
Entrance to the station

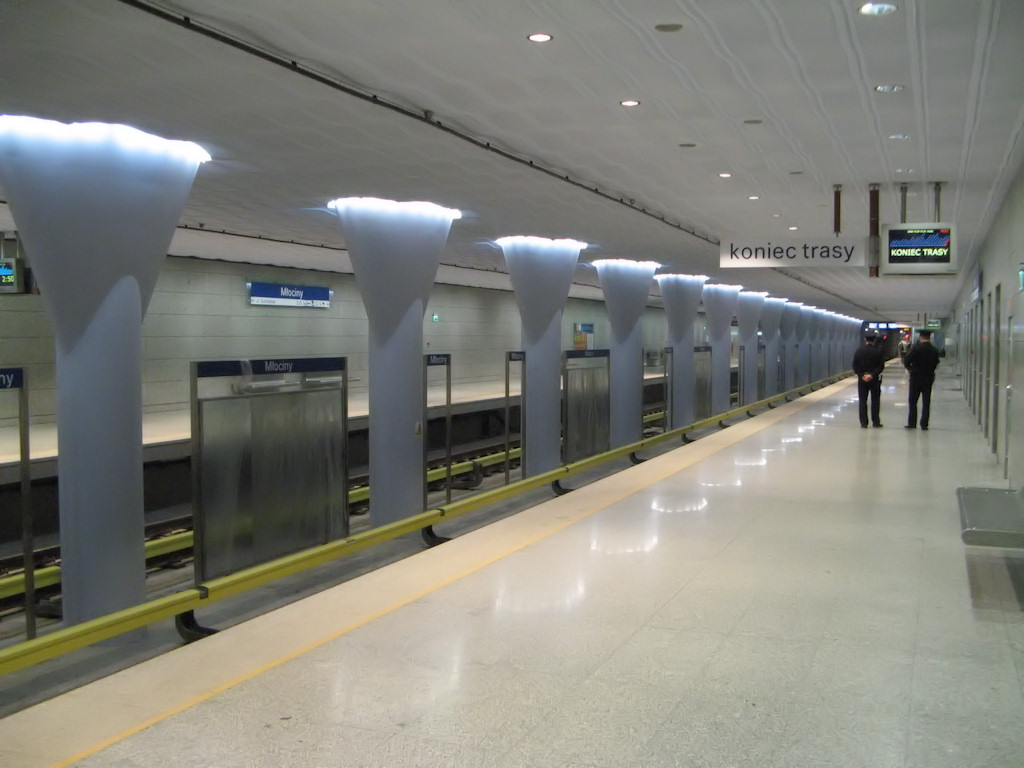
Main platform

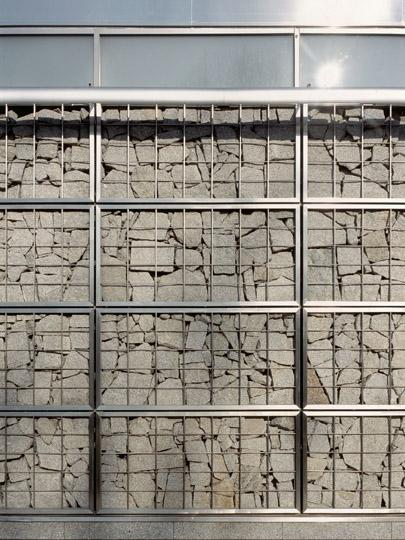
Interior detail
