= Targówek Mieszkaniowy metro station =

Warsaw metro station

Targówek Mieszkaniowy
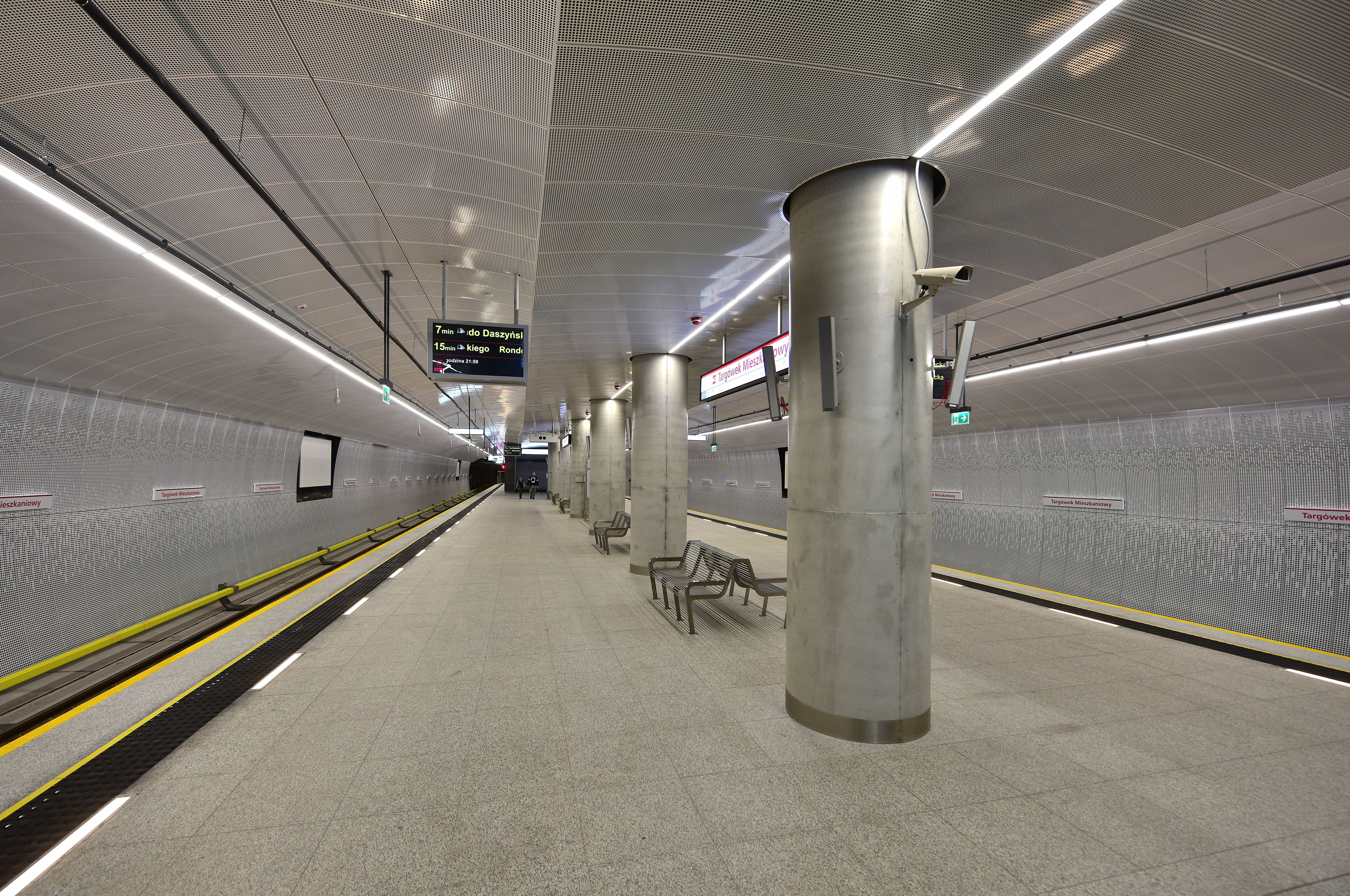

General information
- Other names: Targówek
- Location: Targówek; Warsaw; Poland
- Coordinates: 52.2695°N 21.0514°E
- Operator: ZTM Warszawa
- Platforms: 1 island platform
- Tracks: 2
- Connections: 120, 156, 160, 212, 356; N02, N12, N62

Construction
- Structure type: Underground
- Accessible: Yes

Other information
- Station code: C-17
- Fare zone: 1

History
- Opened: 15 September 2019; 6 years ago
- Former names: Targówek I (In planning phase)

Services
Preceding station	Warsaw Metro	Following station
Szwedzka towards Bemowo	M2 line	Trocka towards Bródno
Location
- Location within Warsaw

Targówek Mieszkaniowy is a Warsaw Metro station in Warsaw's Targówek district. It is part of the extension of Line M2 from Dworzec Wileński to Targówek, with construction started in 2016. All three stations opened on September 15, 2019.

== History ==
On March 11, 2016, a 1 billion zł (€225 million) contract was awarded to the Italian company, Astaldi to build the first phase of the North-East second subway line extension with 3.2 kilometres (2.0 mi) of track and 3 stations: Szwedzka, Targówek and Trocka. On April 30, construction on Szwedzka station started, and on May 2, the other two stations started construction.

=== Construction site ===
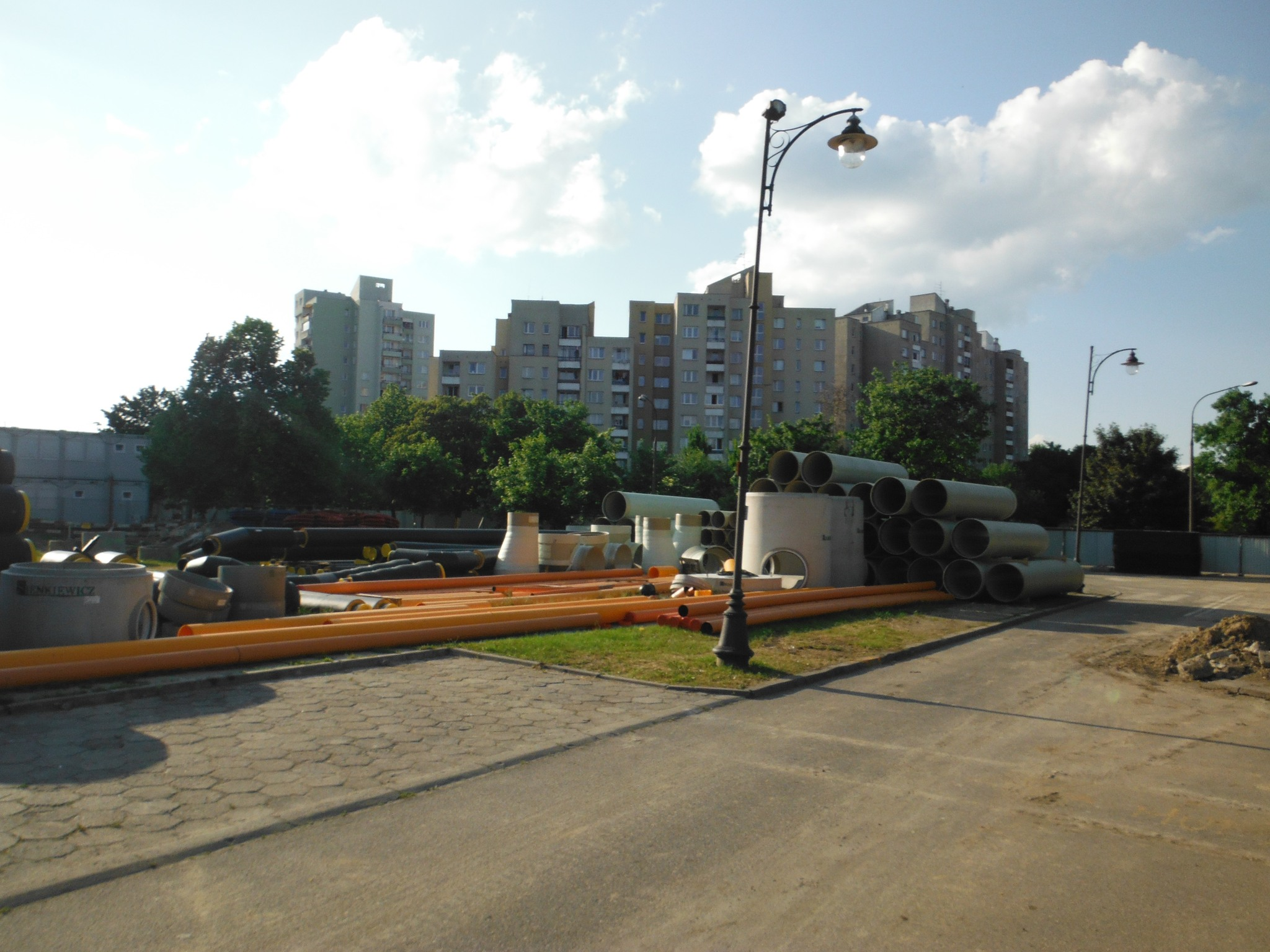

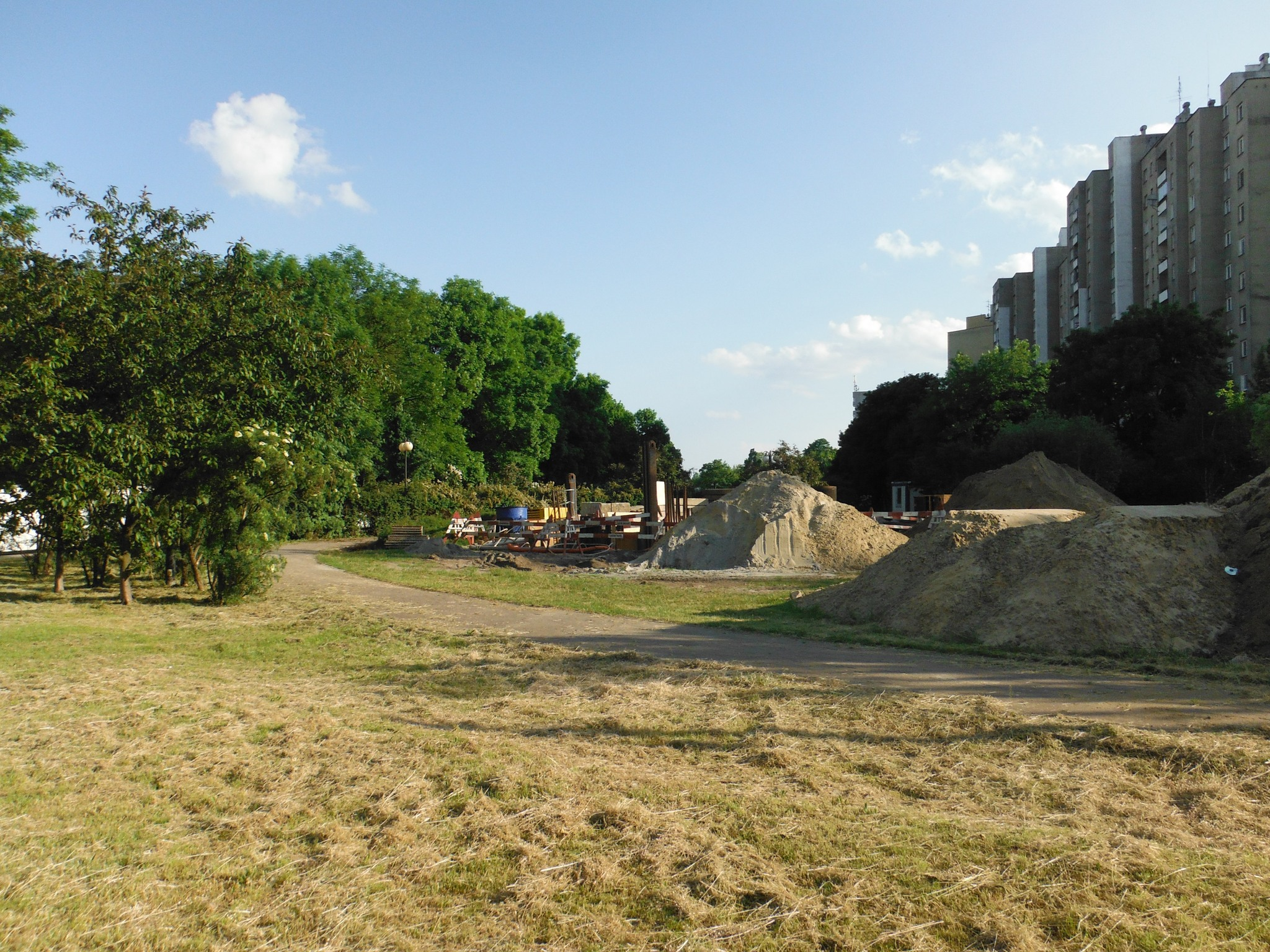

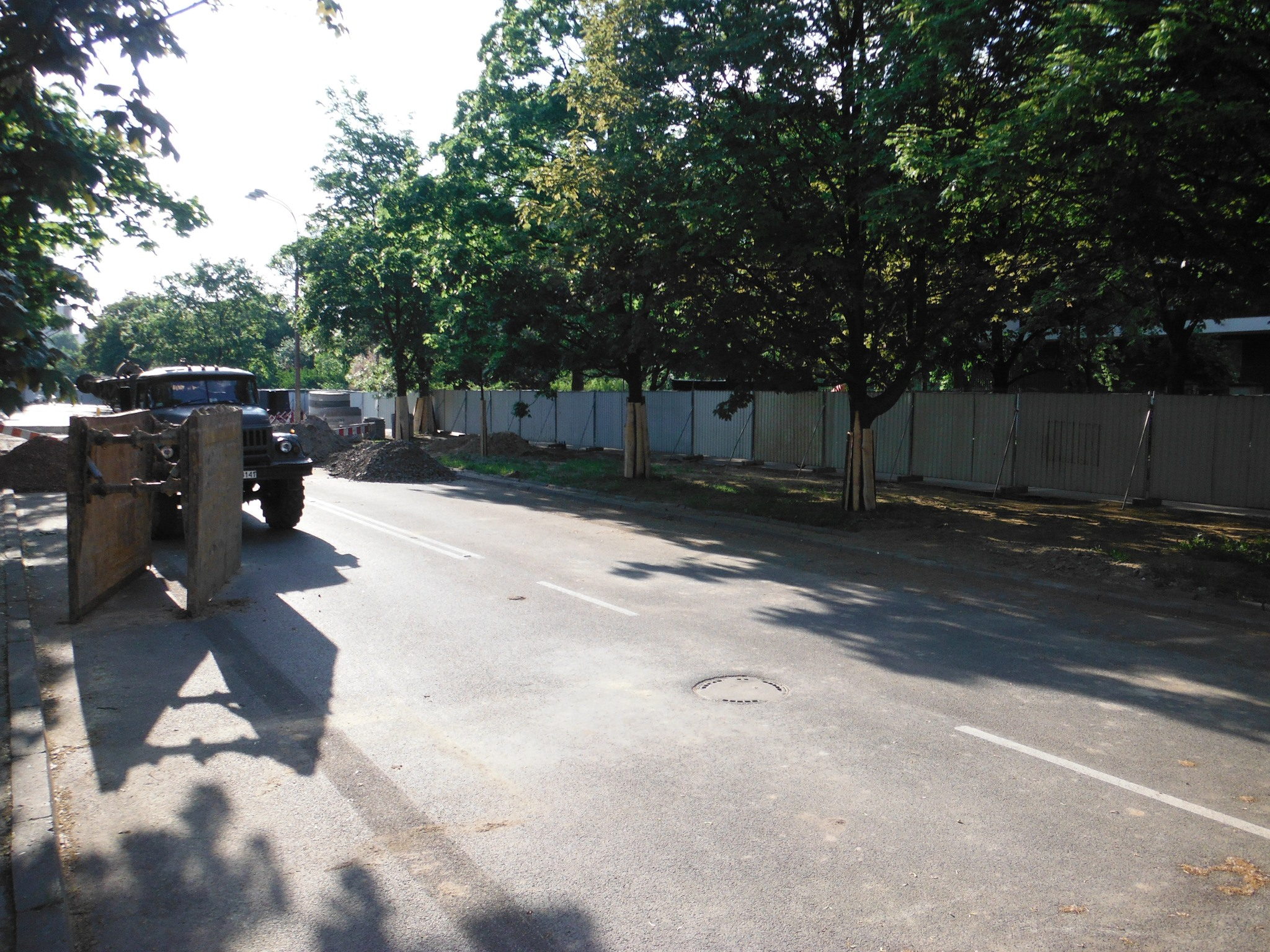
