= Szwedzka metro station =

Warsaw metro station

Szwedzka
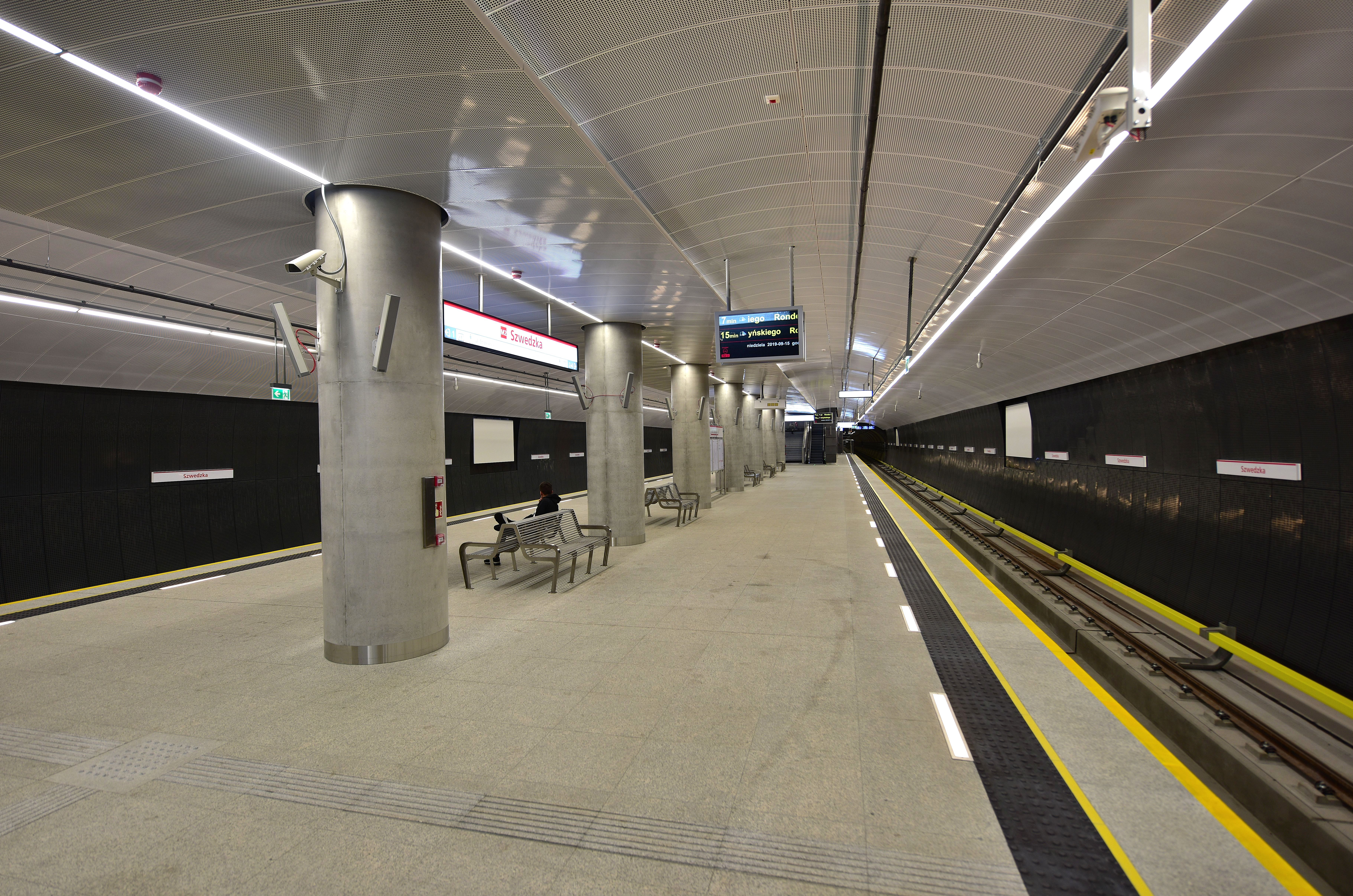

General information
- Location: Praga-Północ; Warsaw; Poland
- Coordinates: 52.2634°N 21.0453°E
- Operator: ZTM Warszawa
- Lines: 135; N14, N64
- Platforms: 1
- Tracks: 2

Construction
- Structure type: Underground
- Accessible: Yes

Other information
- Fare zone: 1

History
- Opened: 15 September 2019; 6 years ago

Services
Preceding station	Warsaw Metro	Following station
Dworzec Wileński towards Bemowo	M2 line	Targówek Mieszkaniowy towards Bródno
Location
- Location within Warsaw

Szwedzka is a Warsaw Metro station in Warsaw's Praga-Północ district. It is part of the extension of Line M2 from Dworzec Wileński to Targówek, with construction started in 2016. All three stations opened on September 15, 2019.

== History ==
On March 11, 2016, a 1 billion zł (€225 million) contract was awarded to the Italian company, Astaldi to build the first phase of the North-East second subway line extension with 3.2 kilometres (2.0 mi) of track and 3 stations: Szwedzka, Targówek and Trocka. On April 30, construction on Szwedzka station started, and on May 2, the other two stations started construction.

=== Construction site ===
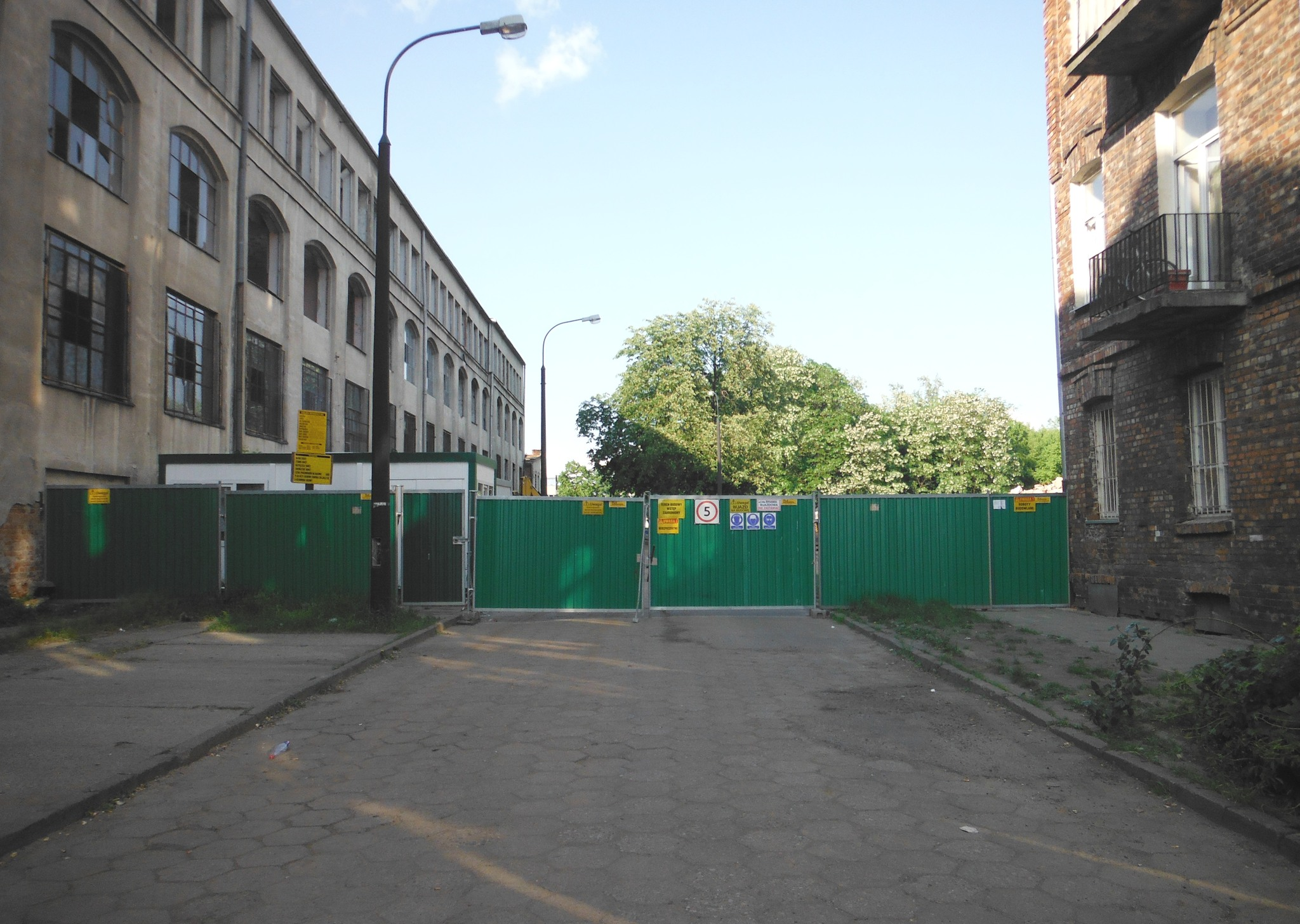

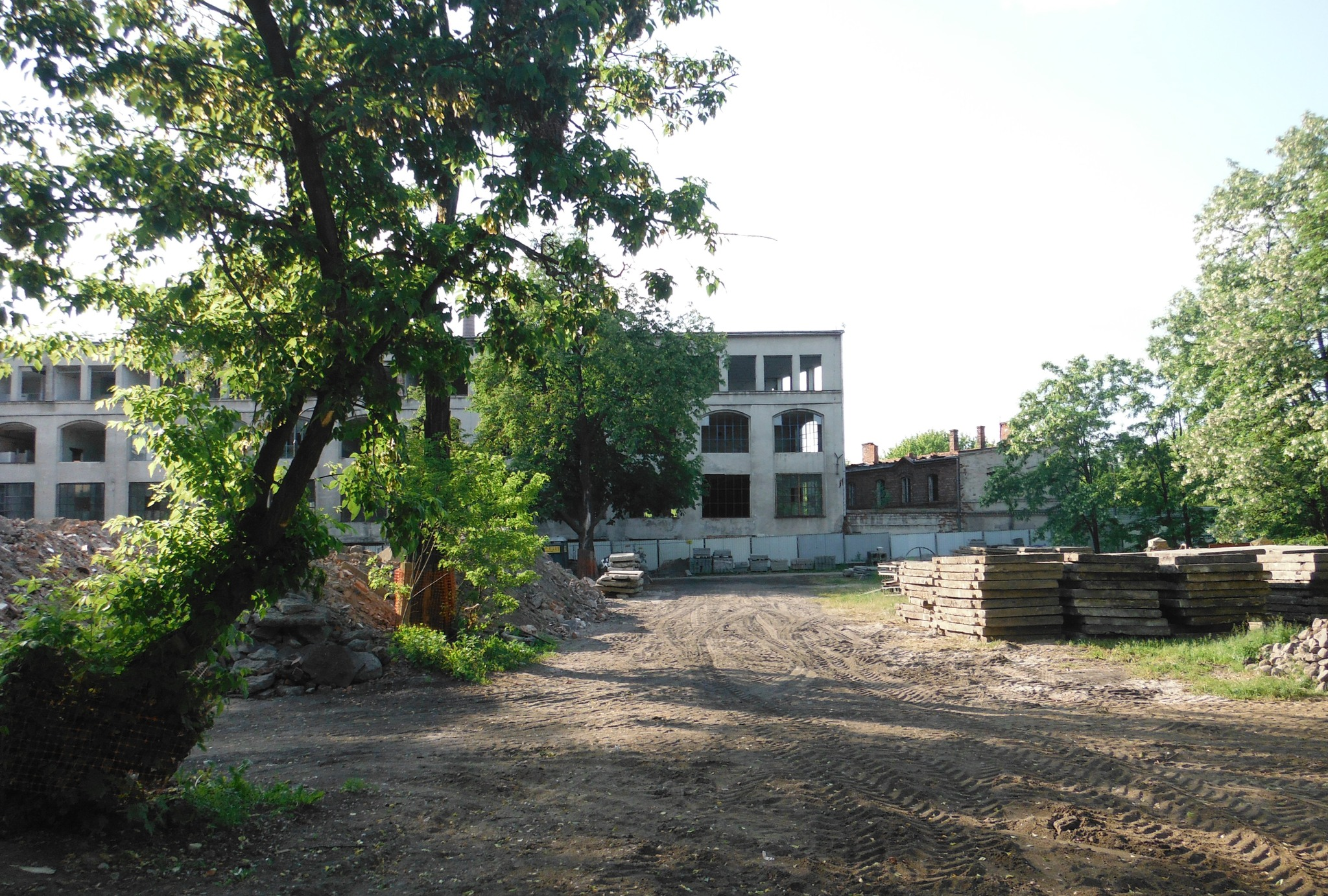

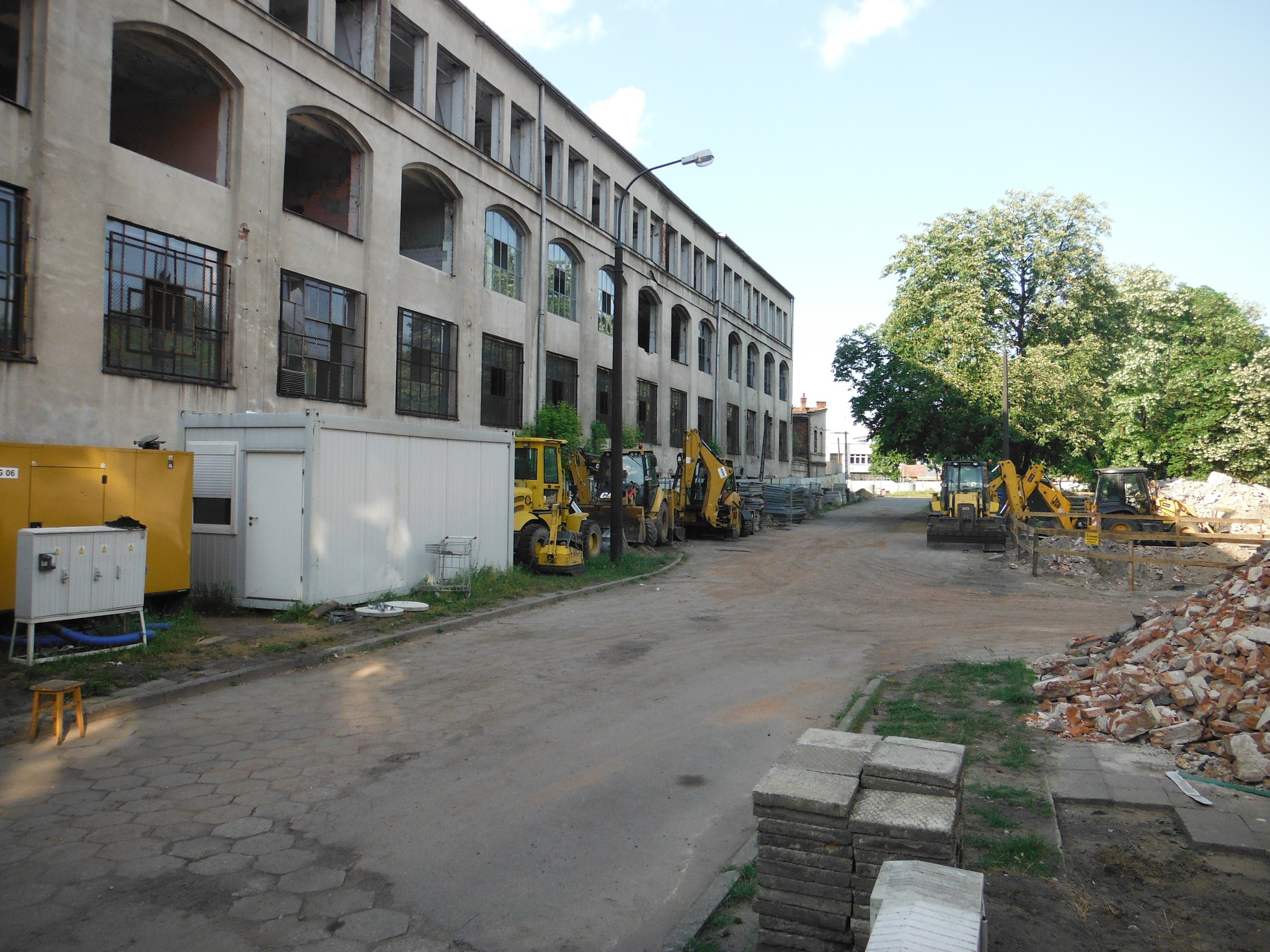
