= Centrum Nauki Kopernik metro station =

Warsaw metro station

Centrum Nauki Kopernik
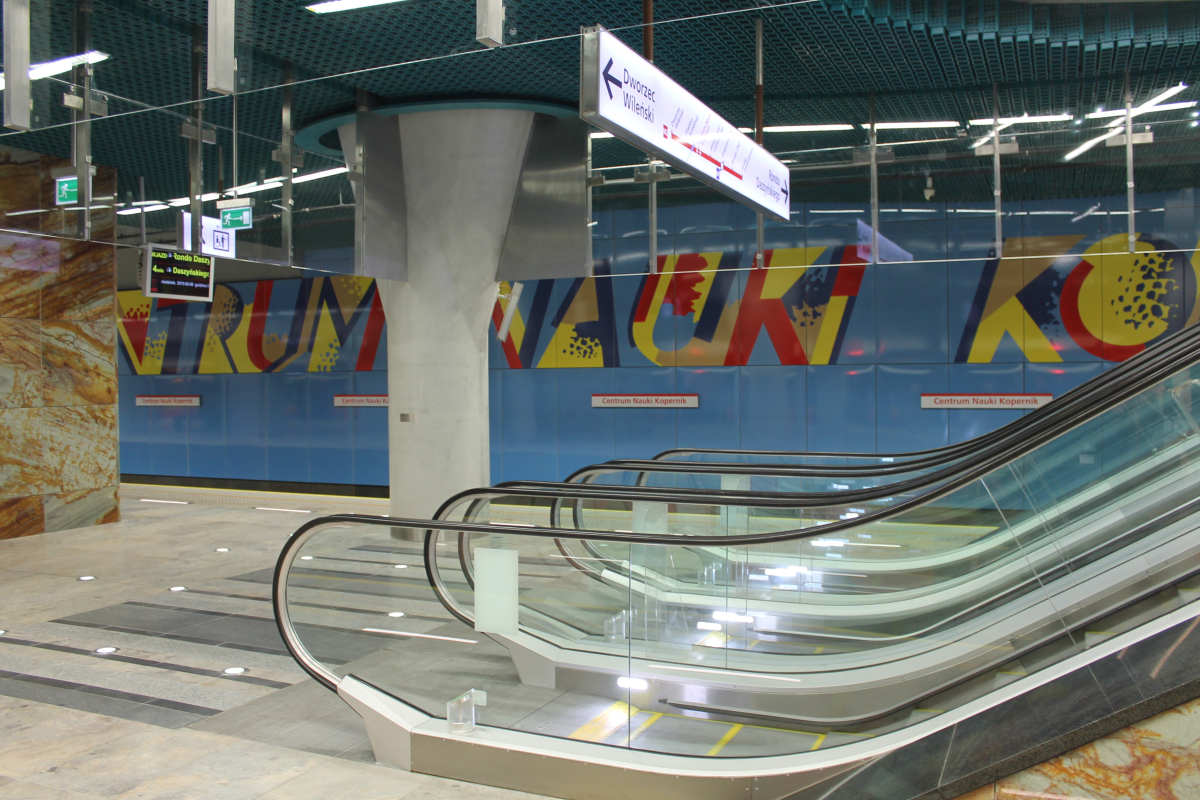

General information
- Coordinates: 52°14′24″N 21°1′54″E
- Owner: ZTM Warszawa
- Platforms: 1 island platform
- Tracks: 2
- Connections: 100, 118, 127, 162, 185; N14, N64

Construction
- Structure type: Underground
- Platform levels: 1
- Accessible: Yes

Other information
- Station code: C-13
- Fare zone: 1

History
- Opened: 8 March 2015; 11 years ago
- Former names: Powiśle (During planning phase)

Services
Preceding station	Warsaw Metro	Following station
Nowy Świat-Uniwersytet towards Bemowo	M2 line	Stadion Narodowy towards Bródno
Location
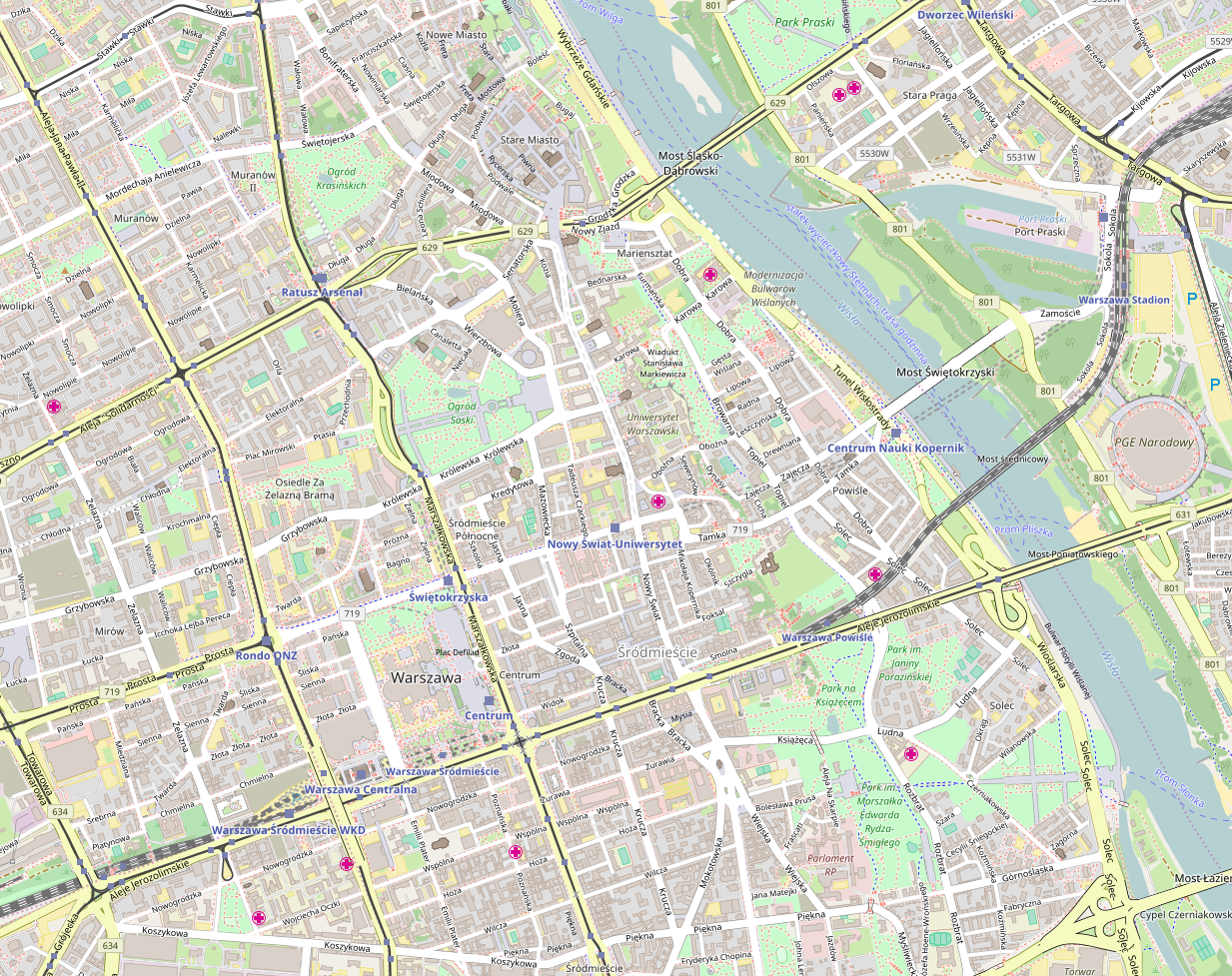
- Location within Warsaw Location within Masovian Voivodeship

Centrum Nauki Kopernik is a station on the central part of Line M2 of the Warsaw Metro.

The station fully opened for passenger use on 8 March 2015 as part of the inaugural stretch of Line M2 between Rondo Daszyńskiego and Dworzec Wileński. It was designed by Polish architect Andrzej M. Chołdzyński and constructed by Metroprojekt. Murals were created by Wojciech Fangor, artist of the Polish School of Posters.

The station is near the Wybrzeże Kościuszkowskie street, very close to the bank of the Vistula river and the Copernicus Science Centre (Polish: Centrum Nauki Kopernik) which it is named after, as well as the Elektrownia Powiśle former power station-turned shopping mall.

== Gallery ==
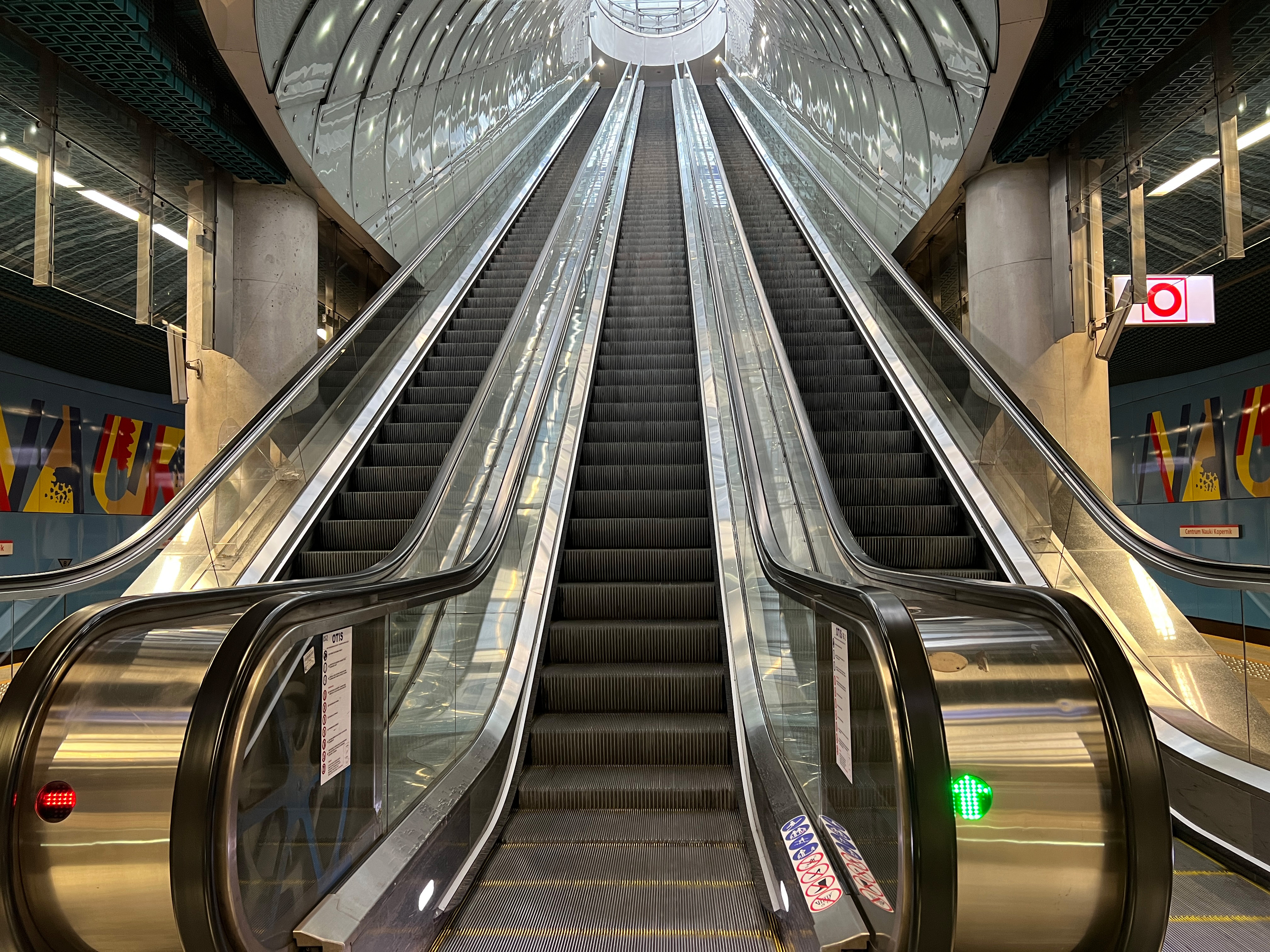
The longest in Poland 40 meters escalator to the platform

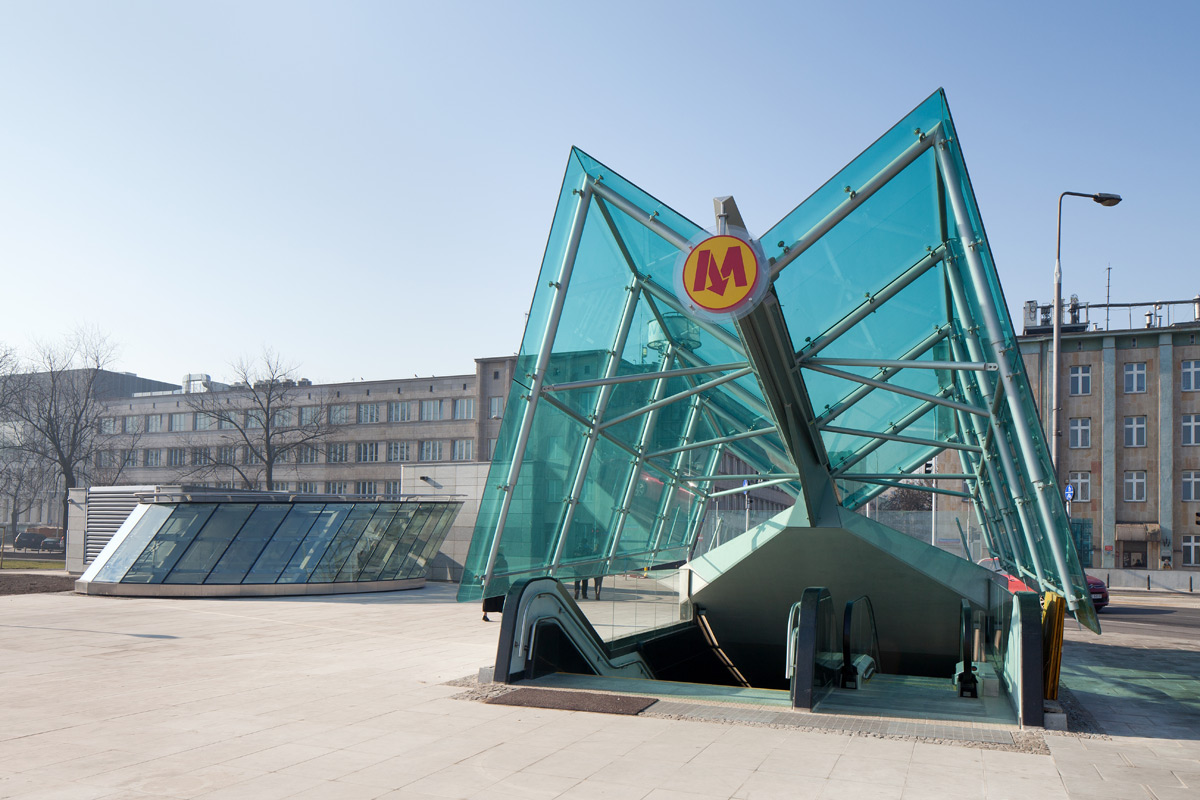
Entrance to the station

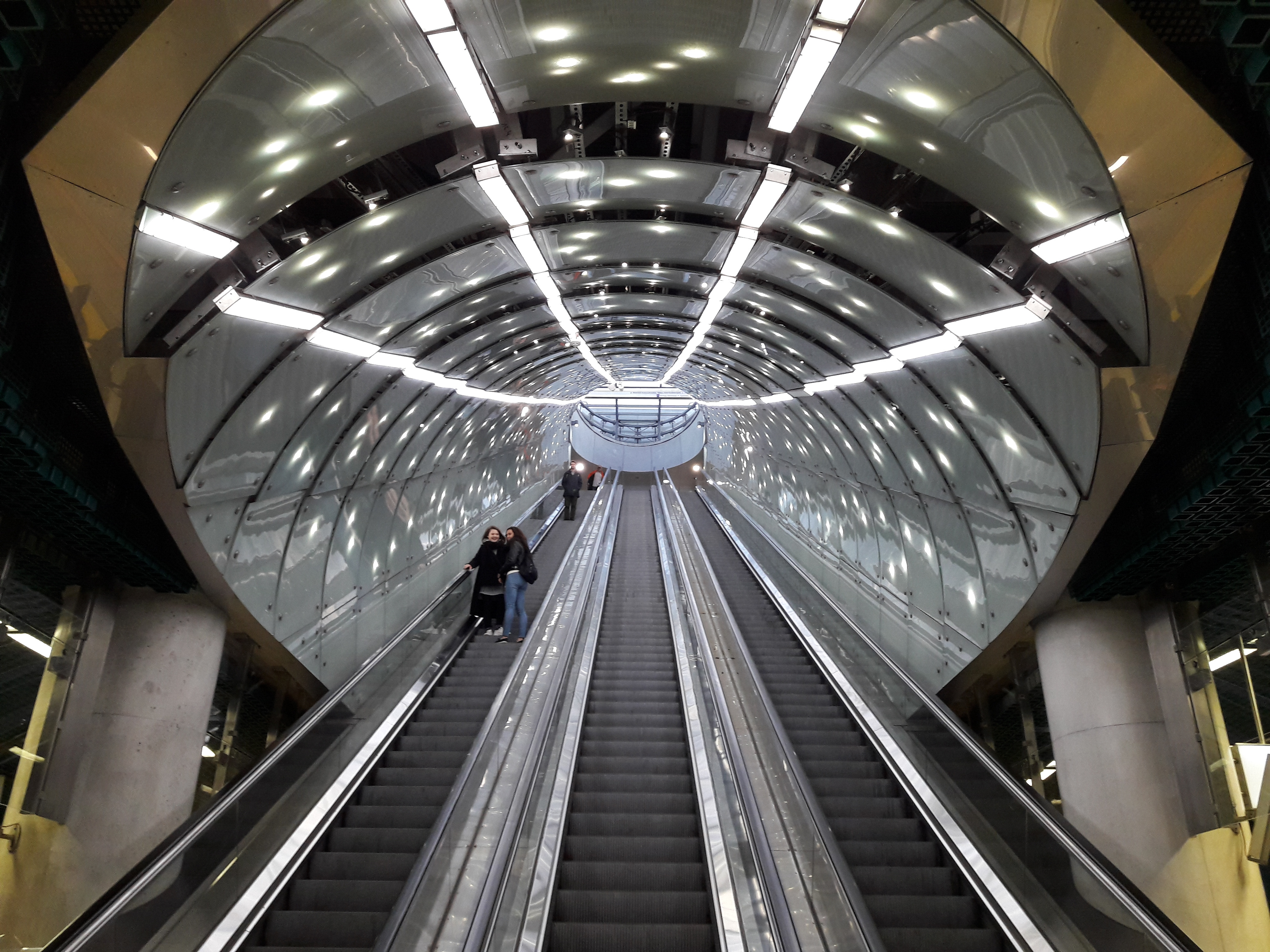
Entrance to the station

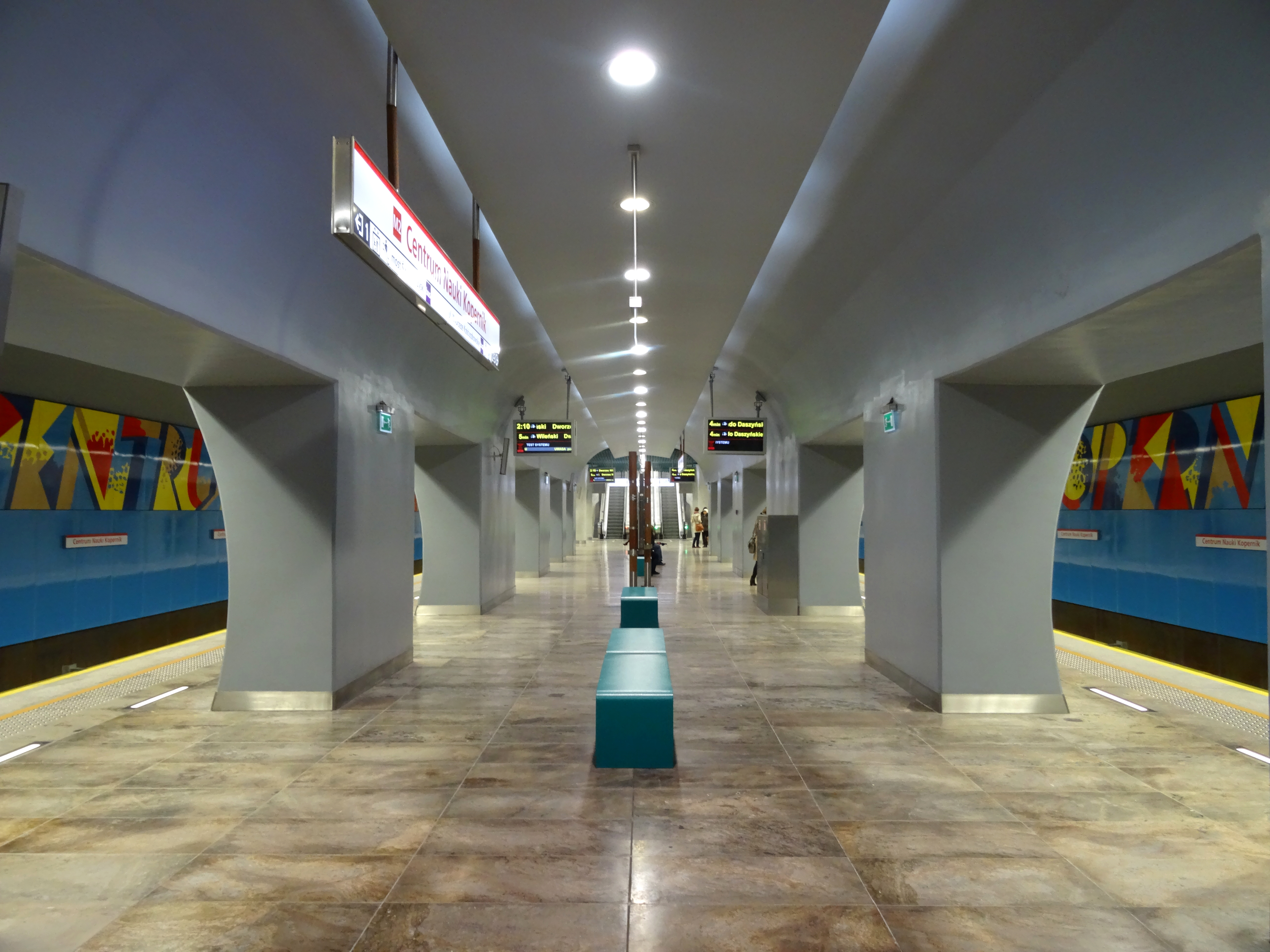
Main platform

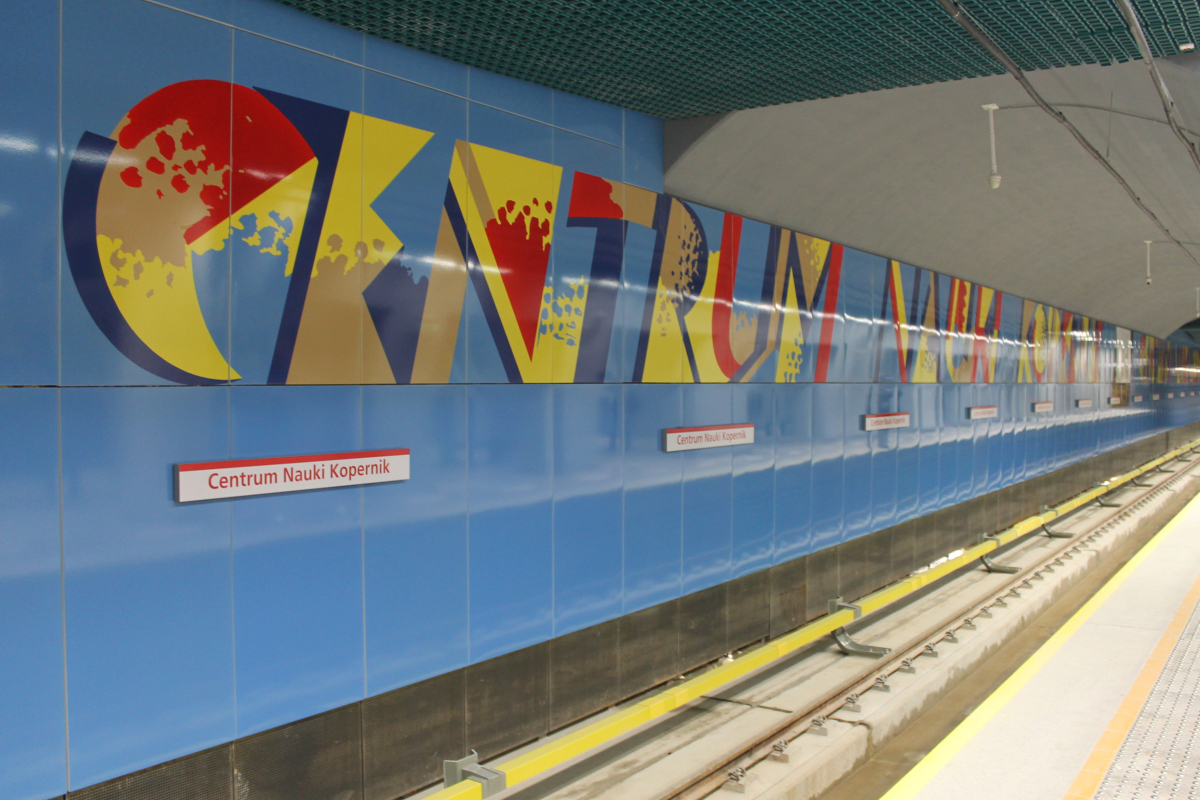
Interior detail, murals designed by Wojciech Fangor

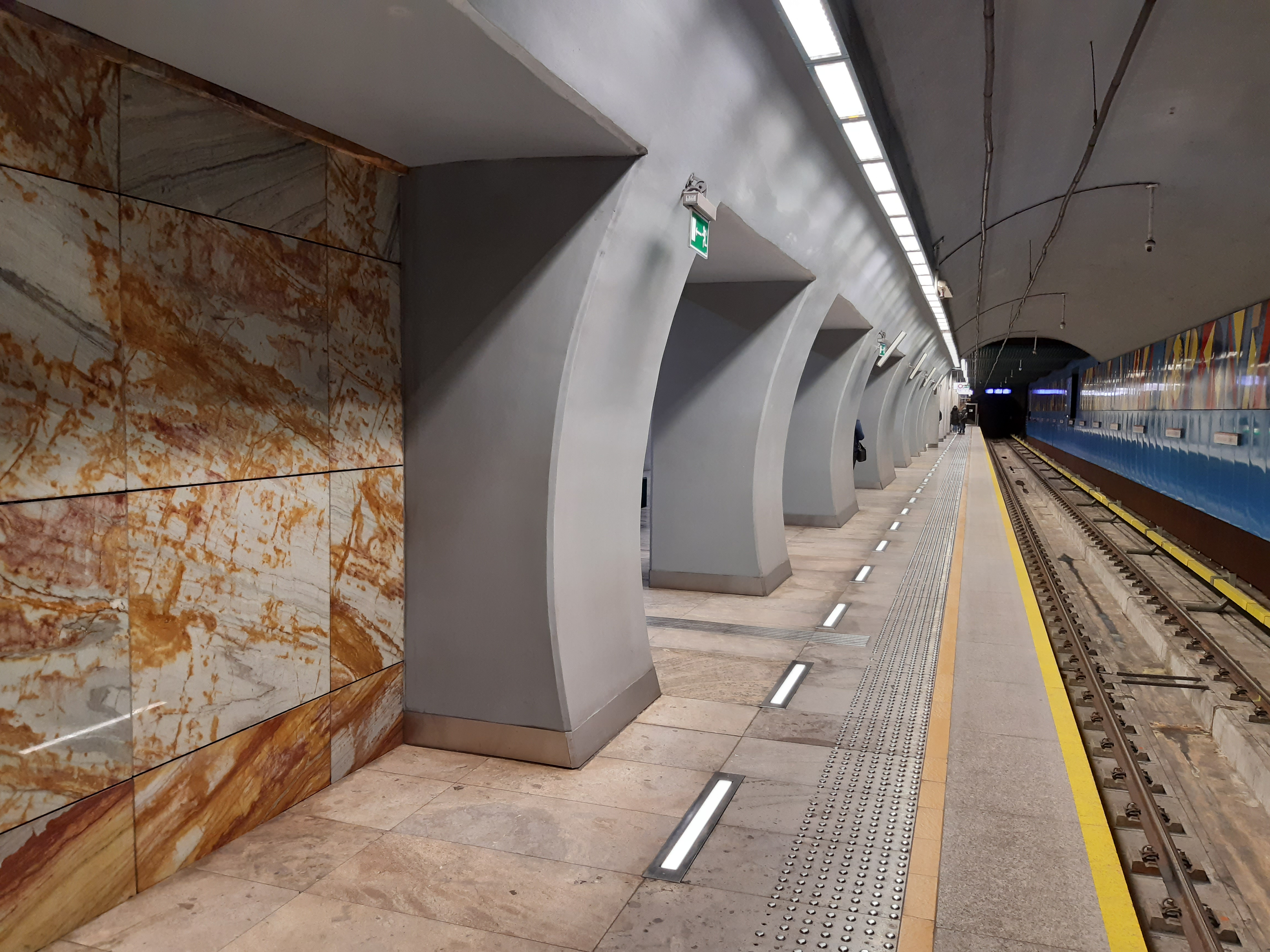
Side detail of platform
