= Zacisze metro station =

Metro station in Warsaw

Zacisze
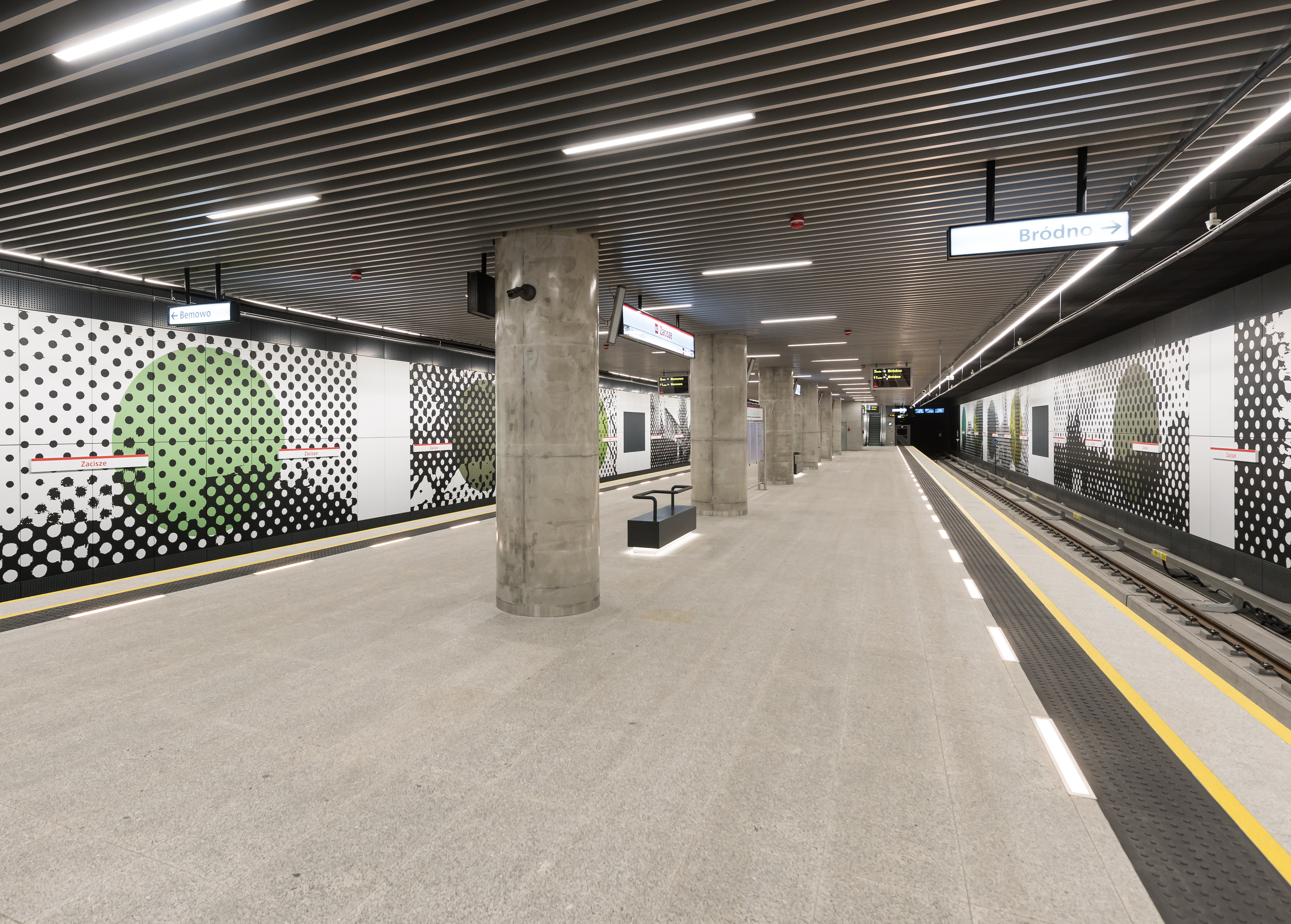
- Platform of the Zacisze metro station

General information
- Coordinates: 52°17′01″N 21°03′44″E
- Owner: ZTM Warszawa
- Platforms: 1 island platform
- Tracks: 2
- Bus routes: 512

Construction
- Platform levels: 1
- Accessible: Yes

Other information
- Station code: C-19
- Fare zone: 1

History
- Opened: 28 September 2022; 3 years ago

Services
Preceding station	Warsaw Metro	Following station
Trocka towards Bemowo	M2 line	Kondratowicza towards Bródno
Location
- Location within Warsaw

Zacisze is a station on the north-eastern part of Line M2 (Warsaw Metro). It is located in the vicinity of Figara, Lecha and Matyldy streets.

== Description ==
Construction of the station began in 2019, with completion scheduled for 2022.

The station was opened for passenger services on 28 September 2022.

Zacisze is the least used metro station in Warsaw. As of December 2025, the station served around 1,500 daily passengers on weekdays and fewer than 1,000 daily passengers on weekends and holidays, accounting for 0.25% of all Warsaw Metro passengers.
