= Księcia Janusza metro station =

Metro station in Warsaw, Poland

Księcia Janusza
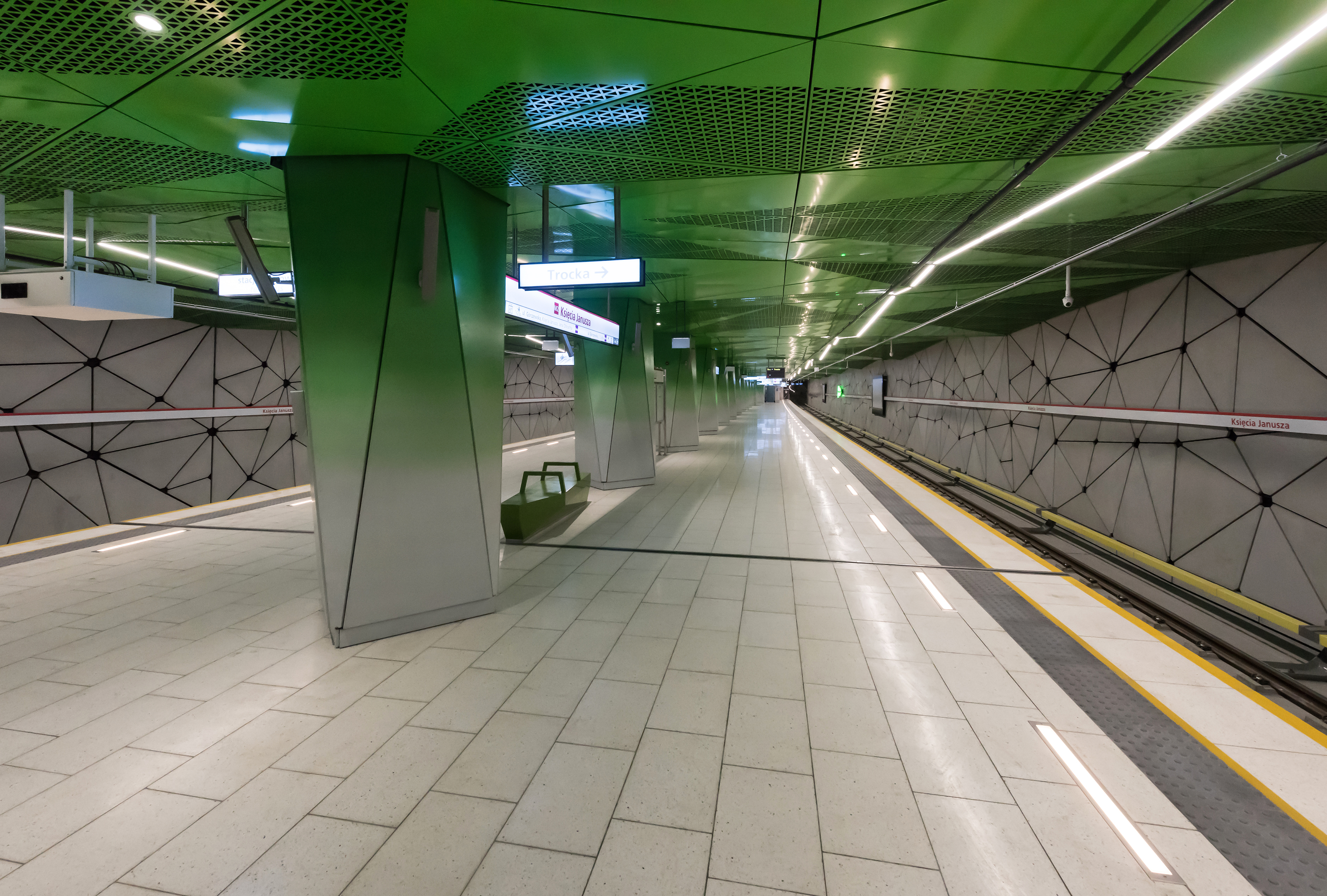

General information
- Coordinates: 52.2391°N 20.9442°E
- Owner: ZTM Warszawa
- Operator: ZTM Warszawa
- Platforms: 1 island platform
- Tracks: 2
- Connections: 129, 171, 190, 197, 201, 523; N42, N43

Construction
- Structure type: Underground
- Platform levels: 1
- Accessible: Yes

Other information
- Station code: C-6
- Fare zone: 1

History
- Opened: 4 April 2020; 6 years ago

Services
Preceding station	Warsaw Metro	Following station
Ulrychów towards Bemowo	M2 line	Młynów towards Bródno
Location
- Location within Warsaw

Księcia Janusza (the Polish for "Duke Janusz") is a M2 metro line Warsaw Metro station in Wola district, by the intersection of Górczewska and Księcia Janusza streets.

The station is 606.1 m in length, and the cubic capacity at 188 480 m³. The green colour scheme of the station refers to the nearby parks: Moczydło Park and Edward Szymański Park.

== Description ==
The station is located 700 m west of Wola Park shopping mall and Ulricha Park and 400 m east of Moczydło Park and Edward Szymański Park.

The contractor for the station was Gülermak, which won the tender completed on 29 October 2015. The construction works began on 26 November 2016. Along with Młynów and Płocka, the station is part of the extension of the M2 metro line from Rondo Daszyńskiego to Wola. All three stations opened on 4 April 2020.

== Gallery ==
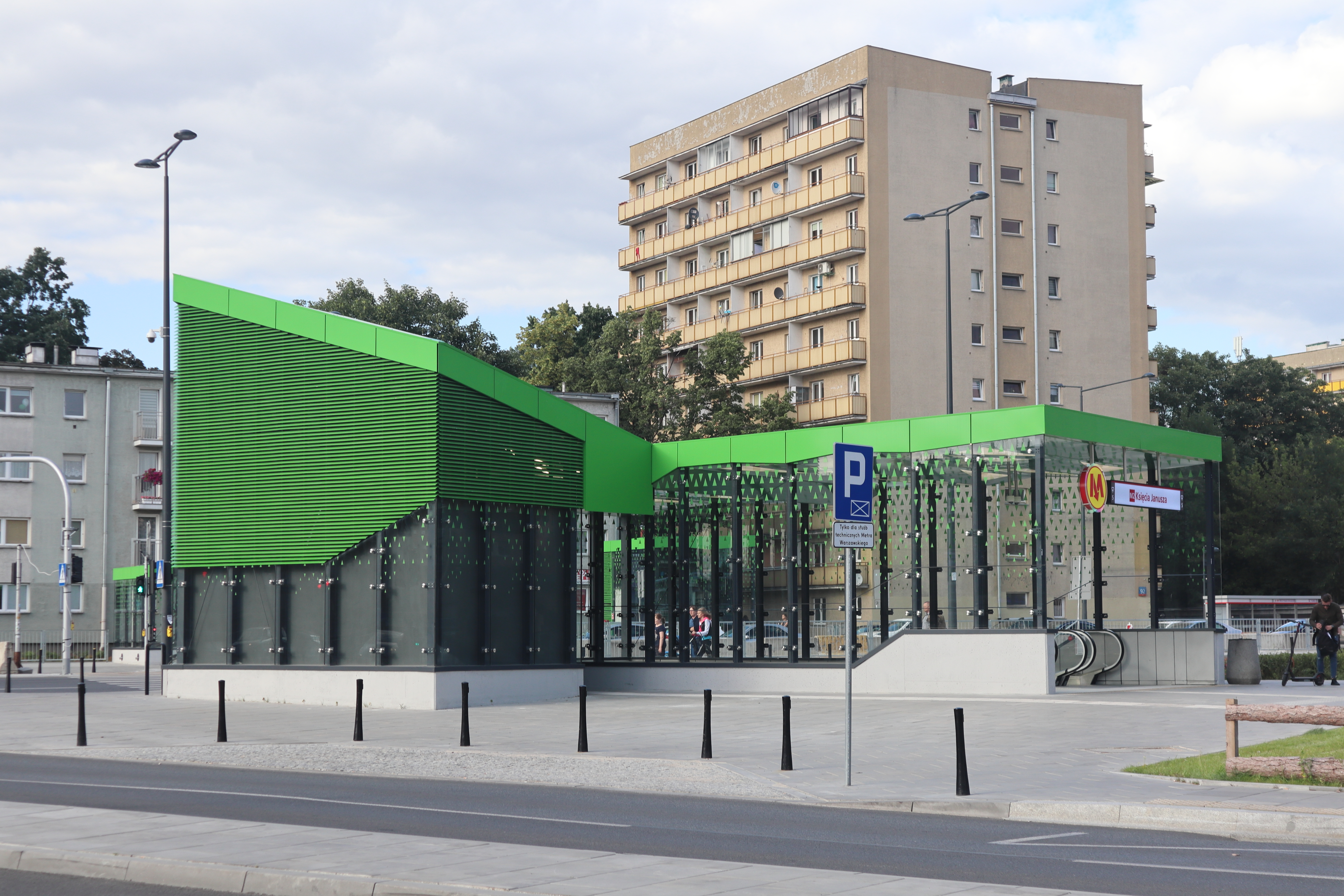
Entrance to the station

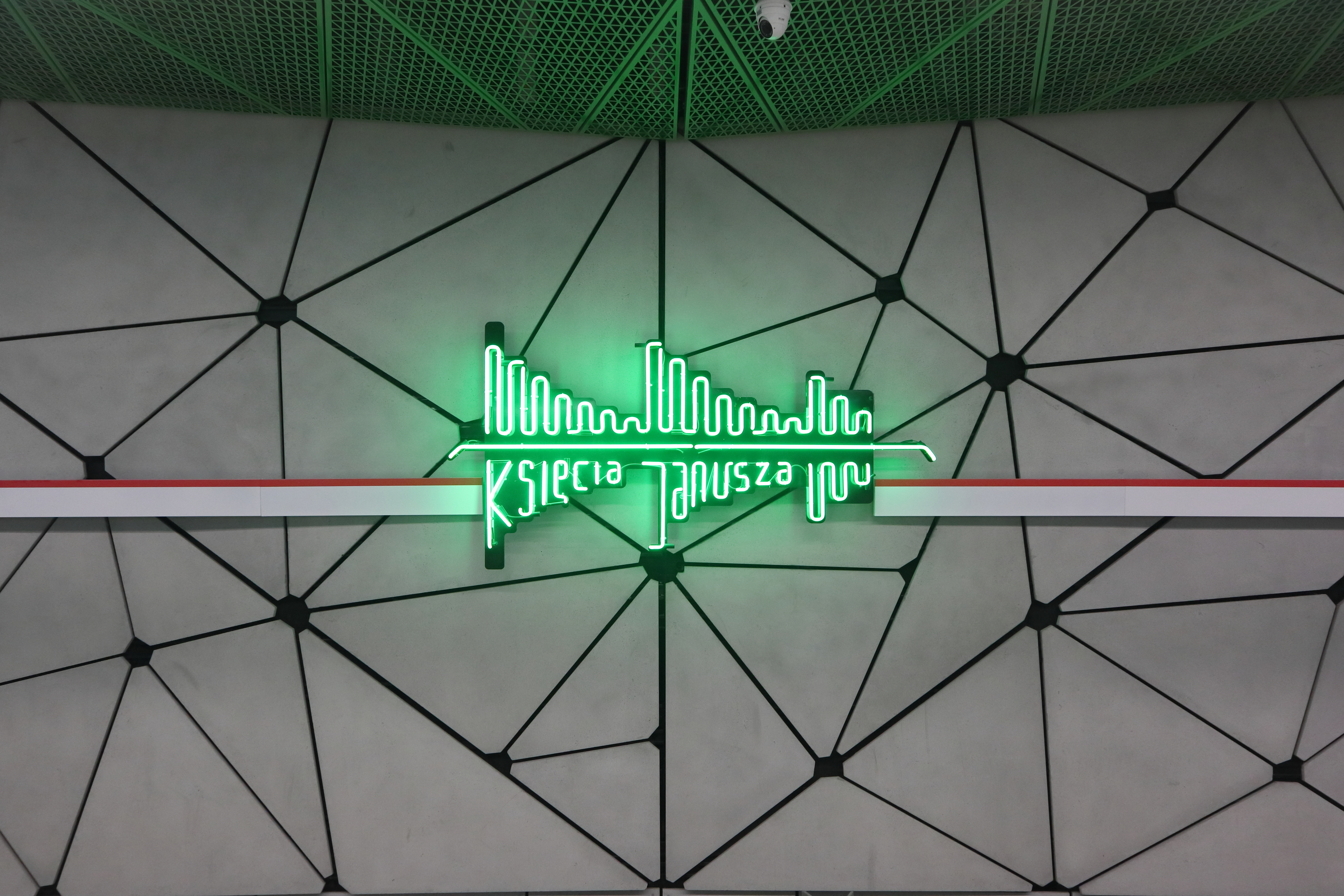
Neon with metro station name
