= M2 (Warsaw) =

Warsaw Metro line

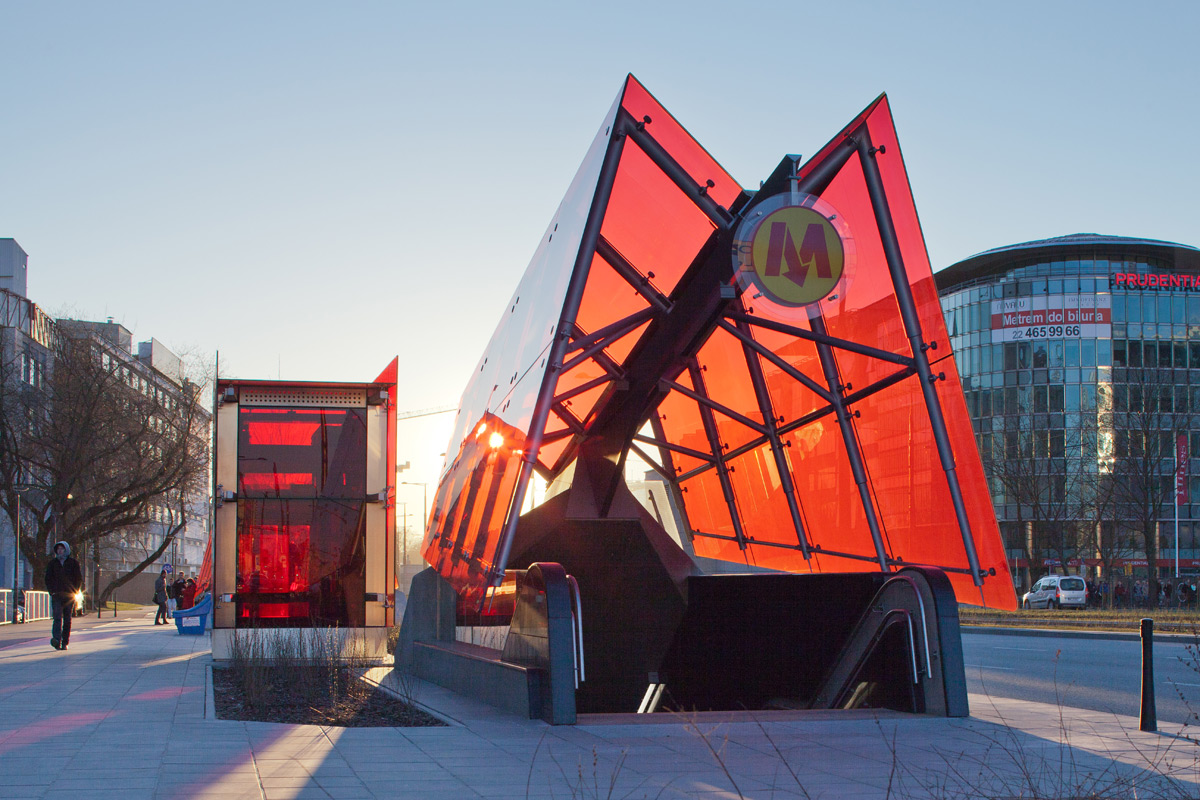
- Entrance to Rondo Daszyńskiego station

Overview
- Owner: City of Warsaw
- Locale: Warsaw, Poland
- Termini: Bródno; Bemowo
- Stations: 18; 3 under construction
- Website: Official website

Service
- Type: Rapid transit
- System: Warsaw Metro
- Operator: Metro Warszawskie Sp. z o.o.
- Rolling stock: Siemens Inspiro; Škoda Varsovia

History
- Opened: 8 March 2015; 11 years ago
- Last extension: 28 September 2022

Technical
- Line length: 18.9 km (11.7 mi)
- Num of tracks: Double
- Track gauge: 1,435 mm (4 ft 8 1/2 in) standard gauge
- Electrification: 750 V DC third rail

The M2 line is the second line of the Warsaw Metro. It is currently 18.9 kilometres (11.7 mi) long, has 18 stations and runs from Bródno neighborhood in Targówek district to the Górce district in Bemowo. The planned line completion is in 2027, and will run from Targówek to Bemowo and number 21 stations.

== History ==
The route of the M2 metro line was confirmed in 2006. In 2007, a tender was announced for the completion of the central section of the route from Wola to Praga. In 2008, the tender was cancelled and a new one announced. In 2009, the new tender was complete and an agreement with the AGP Metro Polska consortium was signed. On 30 September 2014, the construction of the central section was complete and the final acceptance of the investment followed. The line opened on 4 March 2015.

In 2014 a tender was announced for the first extension "3+3", consisting of the completion of three stations in the west and three stations to the east of the existing central section. The tender was complete at the end of 2015 and an agreement for the completion of the eastern extension was signed at the start of 2016, followed in September by the signing of an agreement for the extension in the west. The opening of the eastern extension to Trocka occurred on 15 September 2019, and the western extension to Księcia Janusza on 4 April 2020.

In 2016 Warsaw Metro chose the contractors of the second extension, known initially as "3+2", which included 3 stations in the east and 2 in the west. This was further expanded to "3+5", adding 3 more stations at the western end. Bemowo and Ulrychów metro stations opened on 30 June 2022. The expansion to Zacisze, Kondratowicza and Bródno stations opened on 28 September 2022. The planned completion of the extension is in 2027, with the opening of Lazurowa, Chrzanów and Karolin stations.. In November 2026, Rafał Trzaskowski announced via social media his decision to extend the eastern end of the M2 line to Marymont.

== Planned extensions ==
=== First plans ===
The first plans presumed that following the completion of the central branch, an extension to Bemowo could be complete by 2017, and followed by an offshoot extension to Bródno by 2020. Following these proposals the Warsaw city council analysed the concept of extending the M2 metro line in both directions simultaneously although in smaller increments. It was assumed the extensions to Księcia Janusza and Trocka would be opened to public use by 2017.

=== Białołęka project ===
On 14 December 2011 the Białołęka district council adopted an official resolution for the alteration of the planned M2 metro line route. The resolution proposed the removal of the Bródno metro station by Kondratowicza and Rembielińska streets. The new concept suggested the continuation of the line north past Kondratowicza street, routing the metro line to a newly proposed metro station by the Trasa Toruńska highway and Głębocka street.

In April 2013 the proposed M2 metro line extension was declined. The main allegations concerned inconsistencies between the projects and the provision of local spatial development plans and the lack of appropriate documents describing the impact of the investment on groundwater.

=== Return to initial extension concept ===
In June 2014, a new line expansion schedule was presented, which assumed that three more stations in both directions would be completed by 2018, and the next sections to Górce and Bródno stations would be built by 2020. It was assumed then that the construction of 11 metro stations over the course of 6 years would cost around 8 billion PLN. This meant that the metro would probably not decide to build a branch to Białołęka. In August 2014, an environmental decision was issued for the section towards Targówek, and at the end of September for the section in Wola.

== Current stations ==
Code	Name	Photo	Interchanges	Services	Date	Location	Coordinates
C04	Bemowo			Veturilo, Bike and Ride	30 June 2022	Bemowo	52°08′31″N 20°32′37″E
C05	Ulrychów			Veturilo, Bike and Ride	30 June 2022	Wola	52°08′33″N 20°33′17″E
C06	Księcia Janusza			Veturilo, Bike and Ride, Kiss and Ride	4 April 2020	Wola	52°14′21″N 21°56′39″E
C07	Młynów		Warszawa Młynów railway station	Veturilo, Bike and Ride, Kiss and Ride	4 April 2020	Wola	52°14′16″N 21°57′36″E
C08	Płocka			Veturilo, Bike and Ride	4 April 2020	Wola	52°13′54″N 21°58′01″E
C09	Rondo Daszyńskiego			Veturilo, Bike and Ride	8 March 2015	Wola	52°08′05″N 21°35′24″E
C10	Rondo ONZ			Veturilo, Bike and Ride	8 March 2015	Wola/ Śródmieście	52°08′09″N 21°35′43″E
C11	Świętokrzyska		M1 (Warsaw)	Veturilo, Bike and Ride	8 March 2015	Śródmieście	52°08′56″N 21°01′37″E
C12	Nowy Świat-Uniwersytet			Veturilo, Bike and Ride	8 March 2015	Śródmieście	52°08′28″N 21°00′21″E
C13	Centrum Nauki Kopernik			Veturilo, Bike and Ride	8 March 2015	Śródmieście	52°08′33″N 21°00′55″E
C14	Stadion Narodowy		Warszawa Stadion railway station	Veturilo, Park and ride, Bike and Ride	8 March 2015	Praga-Północ	52°08′40″N 21°01′25″E
C15	Dworzec Wileński		Warszawa Wileńska railway station	Veturilo, Bike and Ride, Kiss and Ride	8 March 2015	Praga-Północ	52°09′05″N 21°01′15″E
C16	Szwedzka			Veturilo, Bike and Ride	15 September 2019	Praga-Północ	52°09′17″N 21°01′27″E
C17	Targówek Mieszkaniowy			Veturilo, Bike and Ride, Kiss and Ride	15 September 2019	Targówek	52°09′39″N 21°01′49″E
C18	Trocka			Veturilo, Bike and Ride, Kiss and Ride	15 September 2019	Targówek	52°09′47″N 21°01′55″E
C19	Zacisze			Veturilo, Bike and Ride	28 September 2022	Targówek	52°10′12″N 21°02′03″E
C20	Kondratowicza			Veturilo, Bike and Ride	28 September 2022	Targówek	52°10′23″N 21°01′32″E
C21	Bródno			Veturilo, Bike and Ride	28 September 2022	Targówek	52°10′25″N 21°00′53″E

== Future stations ==
Code	Name	Line	Date	Status	Coordinates
STP2	STP Karolin	Line M2	2027	under construction	52°07′27″N 21°31′48″E
C01	Karolin	Line M2	2027	under construction	52°07′33″N 20°31′52″E
C02	Chrzanów	Line M2	2027	under construction	52°08′01″N 20°31′56″E
C03	Lazurowa	Line M2	2027	under construction	52°08′30″N 20°32′04″E
