= Rondo ONZ metro station =

Warsaw metro station

Rondo ONZ
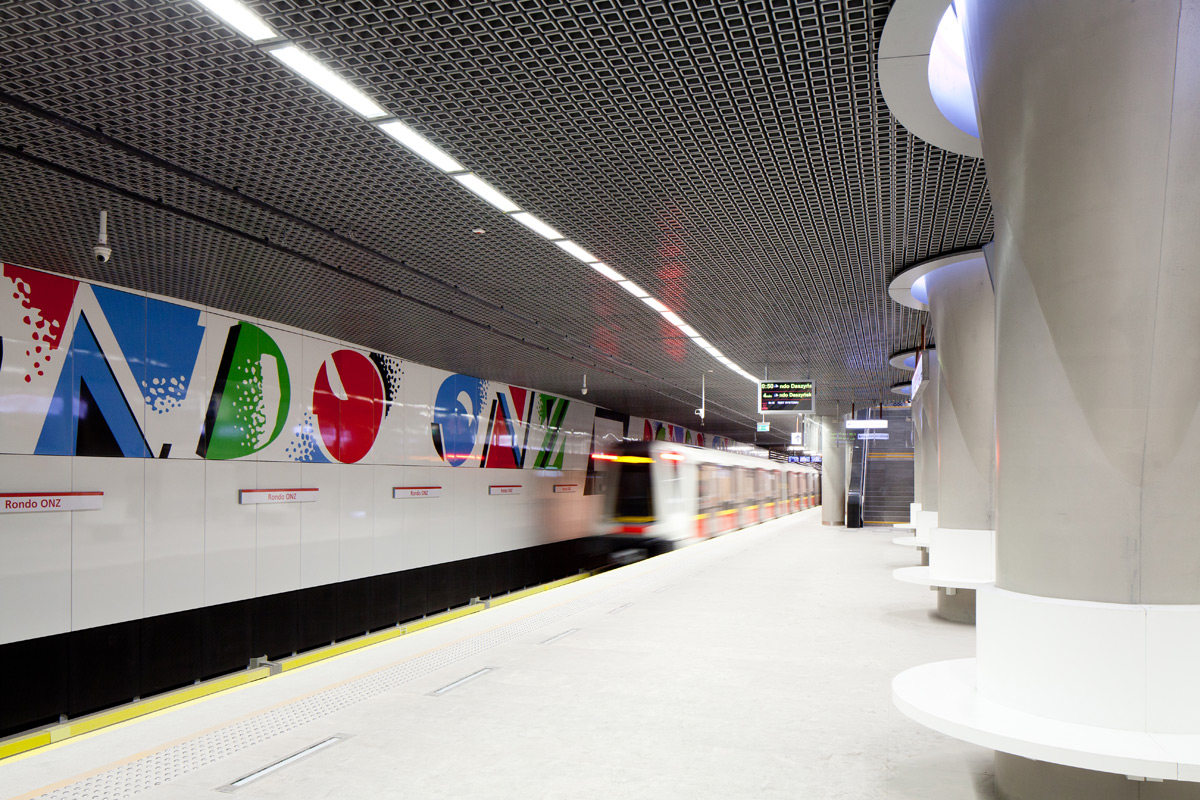

General information
- Coordinates: 52°13′59″N 20°59′54″E
- Owner: ZTM Warszawa
- Platforms: 1 island platform
- Tracks: 2
- Connections: 160, 174, 178; N12, N13, N14, N16, N21, N44, N45, N46, N62, N63, N64, N71, N95; 10, 17, 33

Construction
- Platform levels: 1
- Accessible: Yes

Other information
- Station code: C-10
- Fare zone: 1

History
- Opened: 8 March 2015; 11 years ago

Services
Preceding station	Warsaw Metro	Following station
Rondo Daszyńskiego towards Bemowo	M2 line	Świętokrzyska towards Bródno
Location
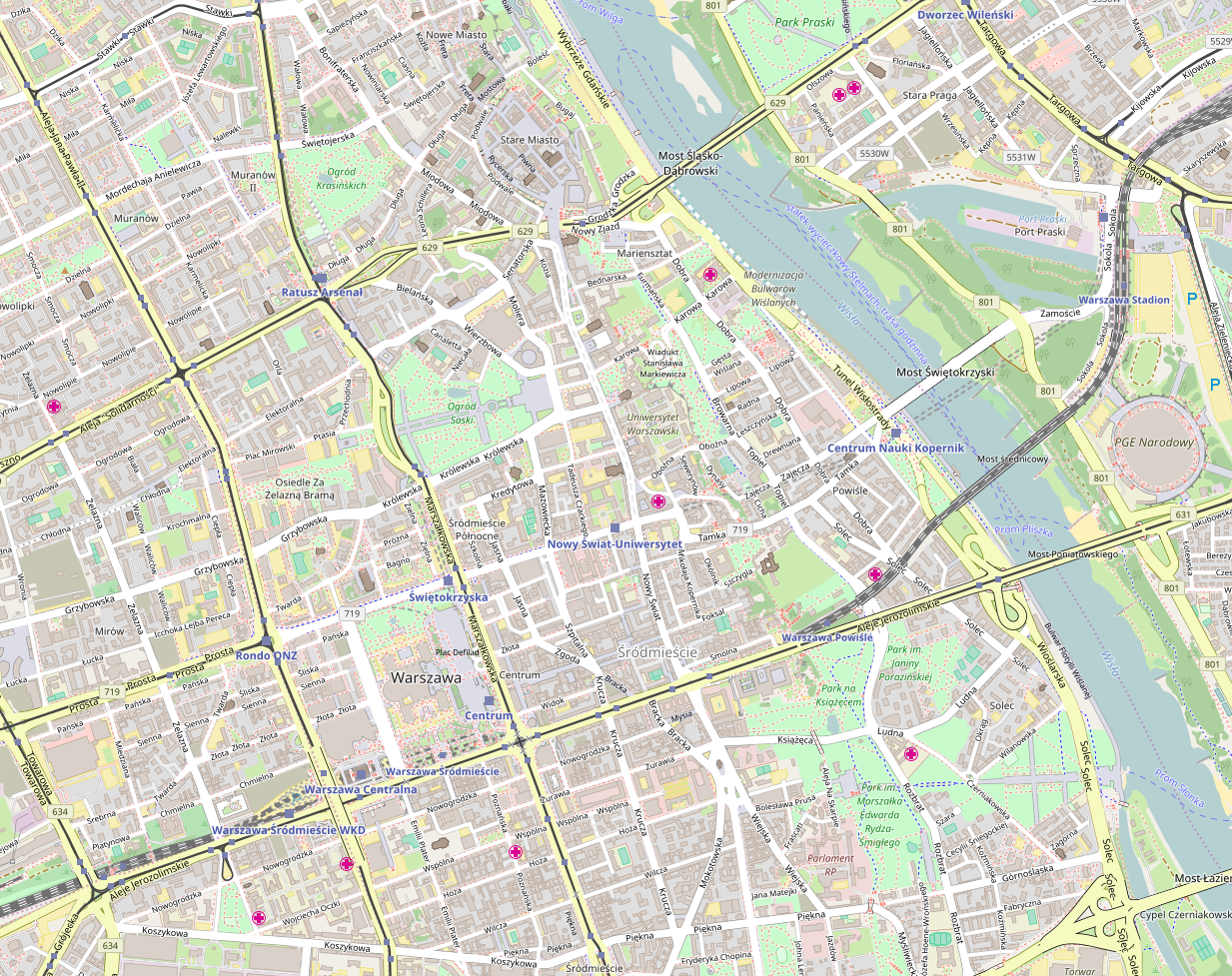
- Location within Warsaw Location within Masovian Voivodeship

Rondo ONZ is a station on the central part of Line M2 of the Warsaw Metro.

The station fully opened for passenger use on 8 March 2015 as part of the inaugural stretch of Line M2 between Rondo Daszyńskiego and Dworzec Wileński. It was designed by Polish architect Andrzej M. Chołdzyński and constructed by Metroprojekt. Murals were created by Wojciech Fangor, artist of the Polish School of Posters.

The station is located under the ONZ Roundabout, a traffic circle situated on the border of Śródmieście and Wola, which is named after United Nations Organisation.

== Gallery ==
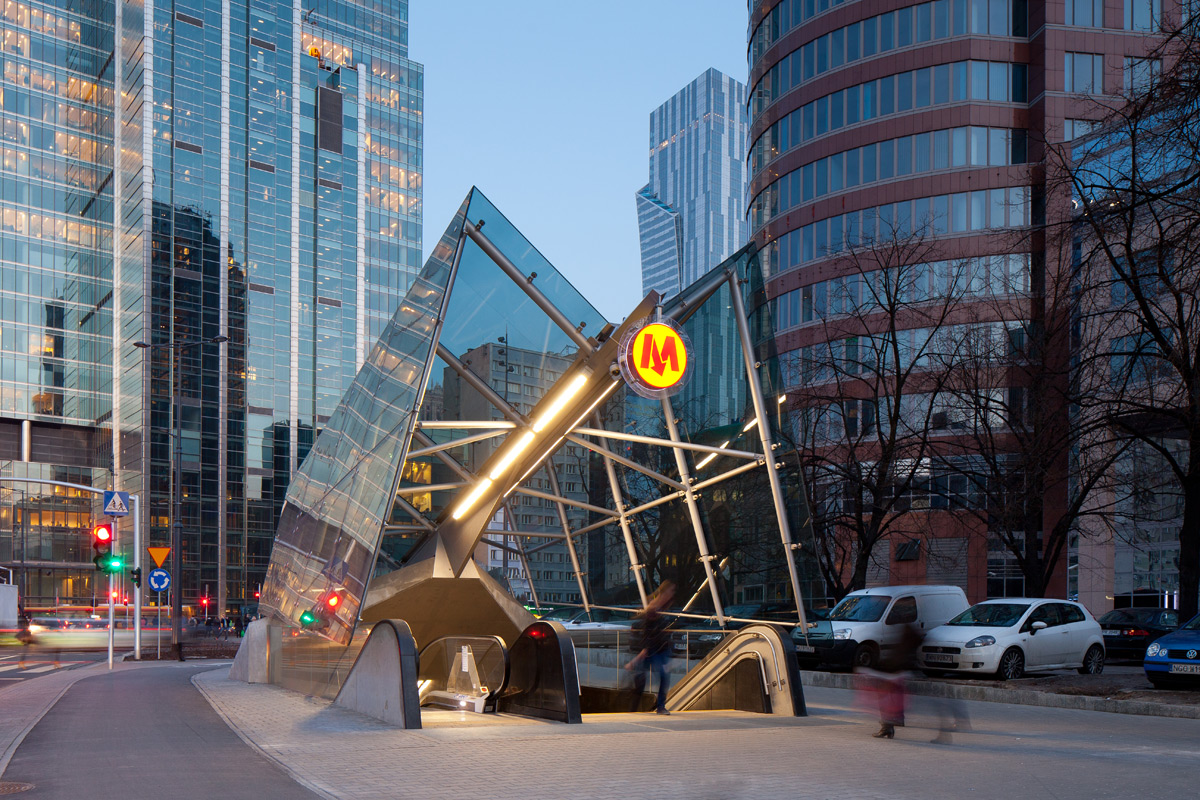
Entrance to the station

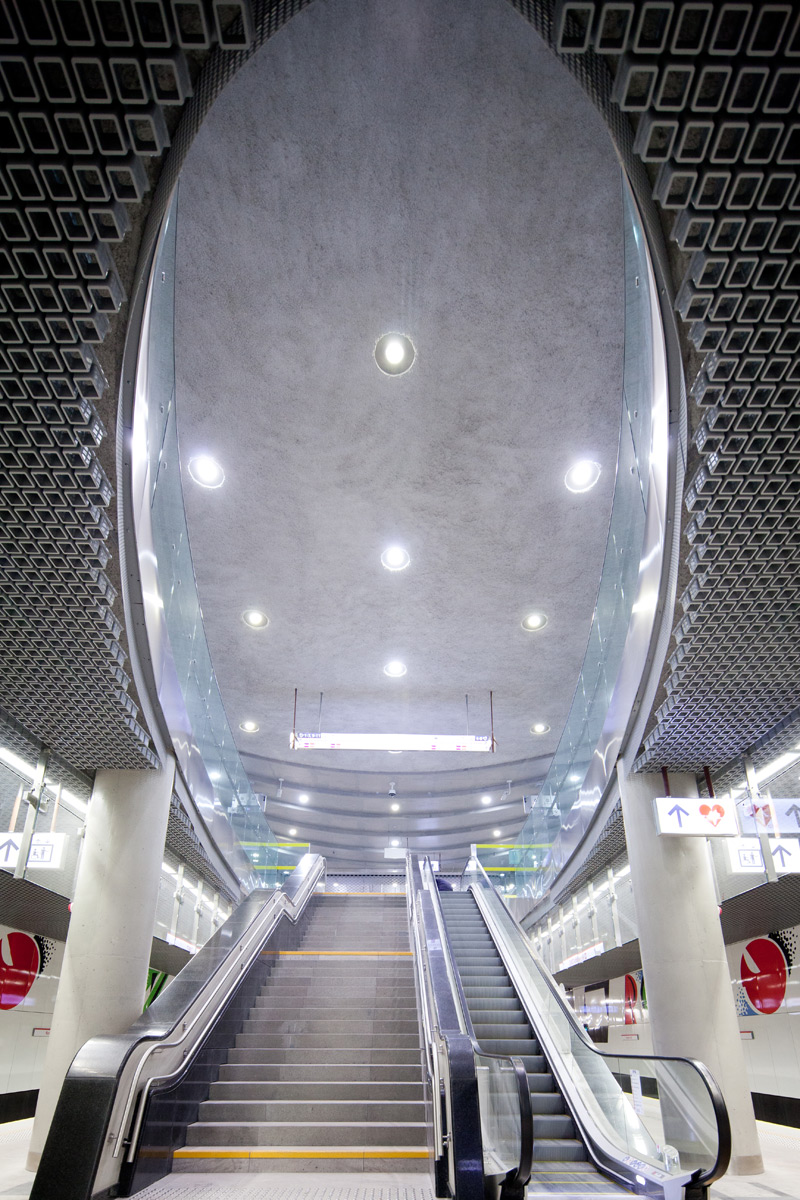
Entrance to the station

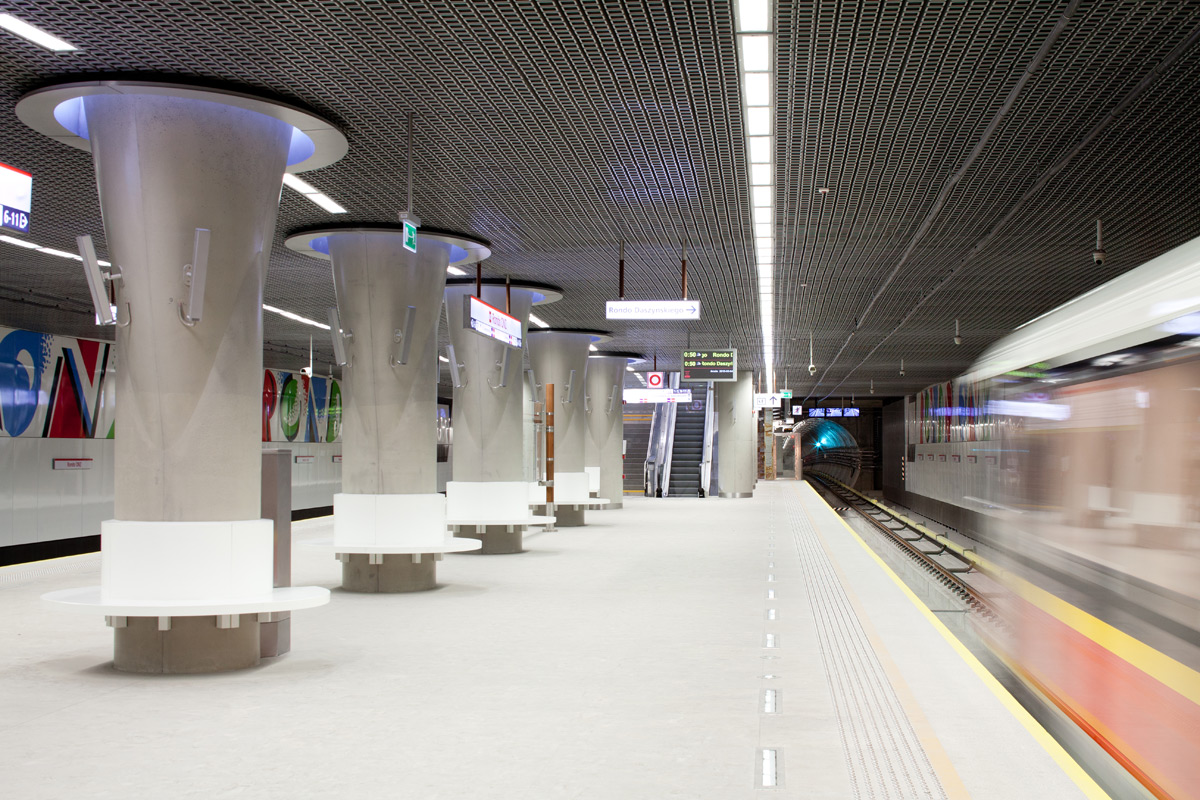
Main platform

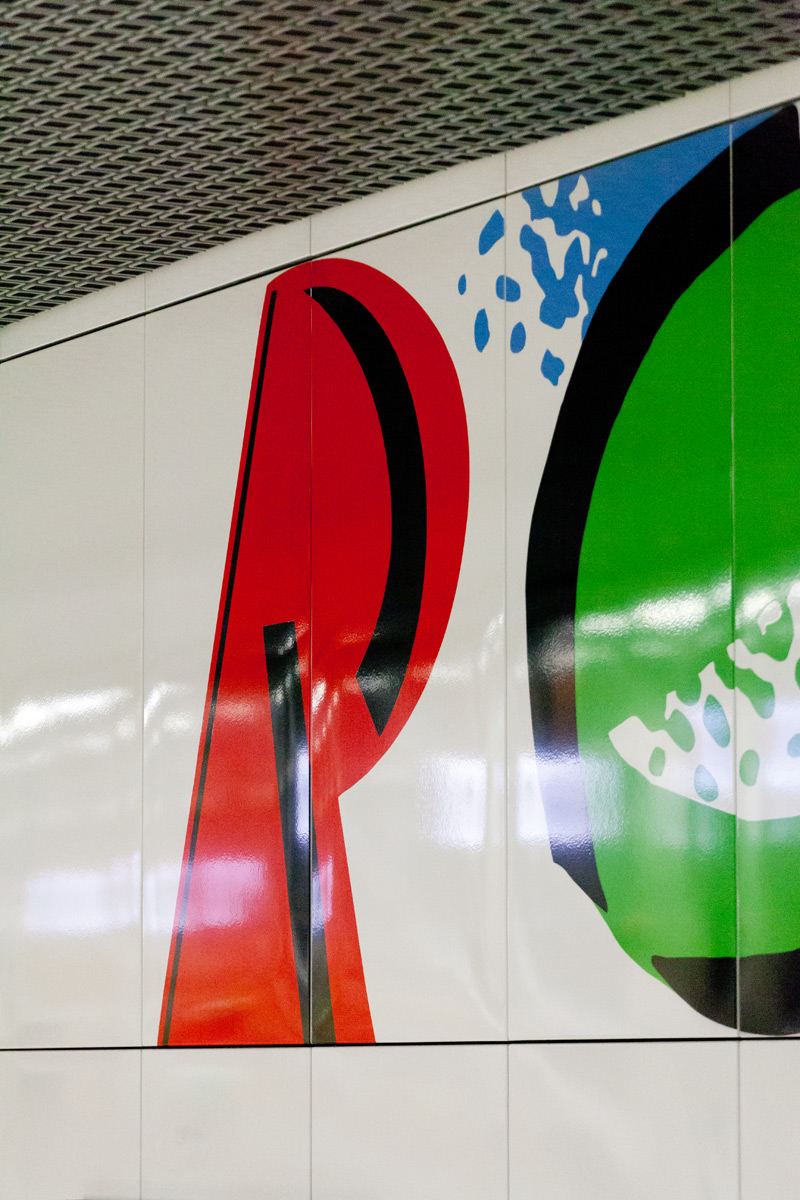
Interior detail, murals designed by Wojciech Fangor
