= Kondratowicza metro station =

Metro station in Warsaw, Poland

Kondratowicza
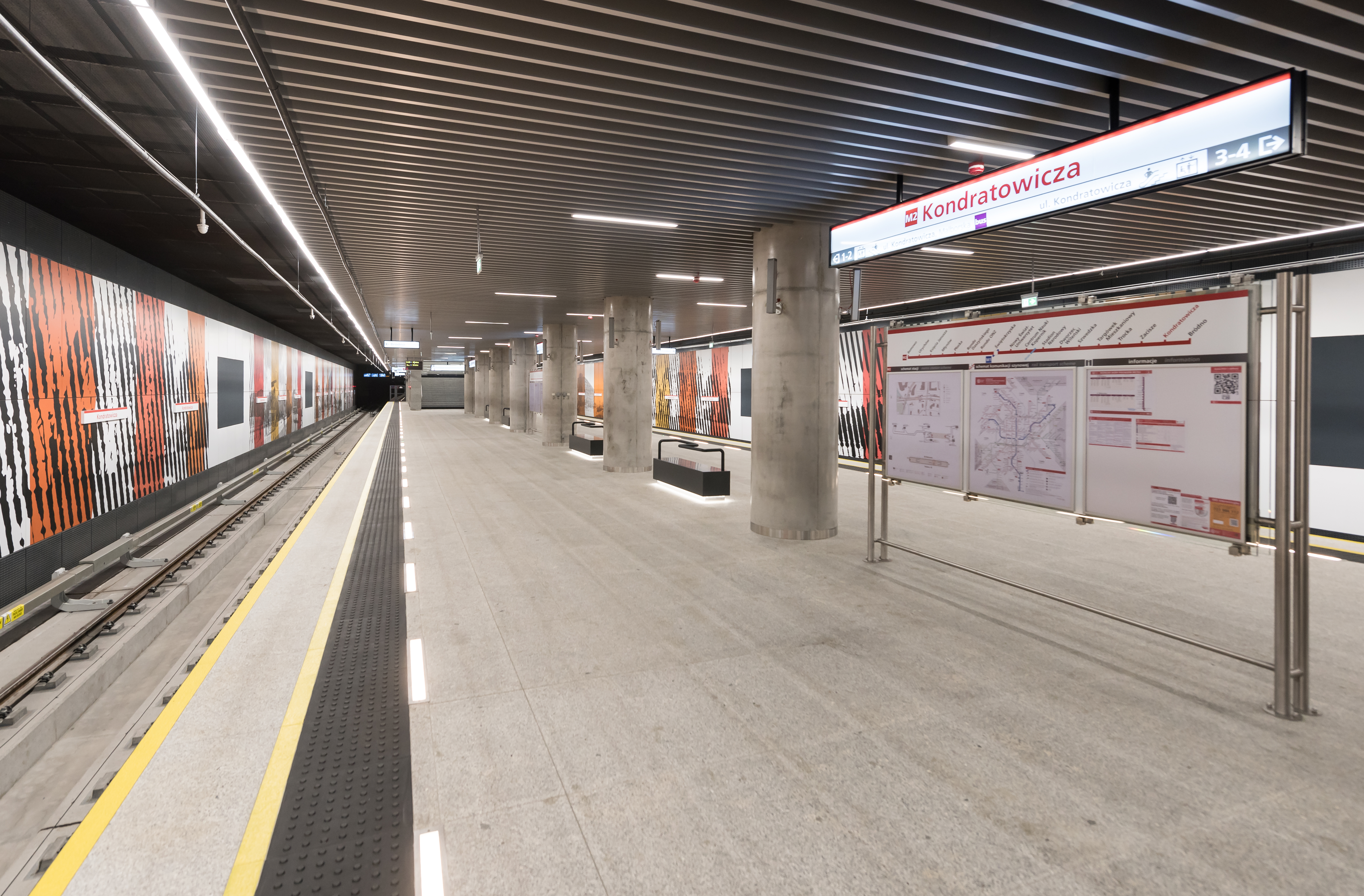
- Platform of the station

General information
- Coordinates: 52°17′31.6″N 21°02′50.5″E
- Owner: ZTM Warszawa
- Lines: 112, 120, 126, 145, 160, 212, 240, 256, 527; N11
- Platforms: 1 island platform
- Tracks: 2

Construction
- Structure type: Underground
- Platform levels: 1
- Accessible: Yes

Other information
- Station code: C-20
- Fare zone: 1

History
- Opened: 28 September 2022; 3 years ago

Services
Preceding station	Warsaw Metro	Following station
Zacisze towards Bemowo	M2 line	Bródno Terminus
Location
- Location within Warsaw

Kondratowicza is a station on the north-eastern part of Line M2 (Warsaw Metro). It is located in the vicinity of Ludwika Kondratowicza, Malborska, 20 Dywizji Piechoty Wojska Polskiego and Aleksandra Kowalskiego streets. The station is located by the Masovian Bródno District Hospital (Mazowiecki Szpital Bródnowski).

== Description ==
The construction of the station began in 2019.

The planned opening of the station is in 2022.

The station was opened for passenger services on 28 September 2022.
