= Ulrychów metro station =

Metro station in Warsaw, Poland

Ulrychów
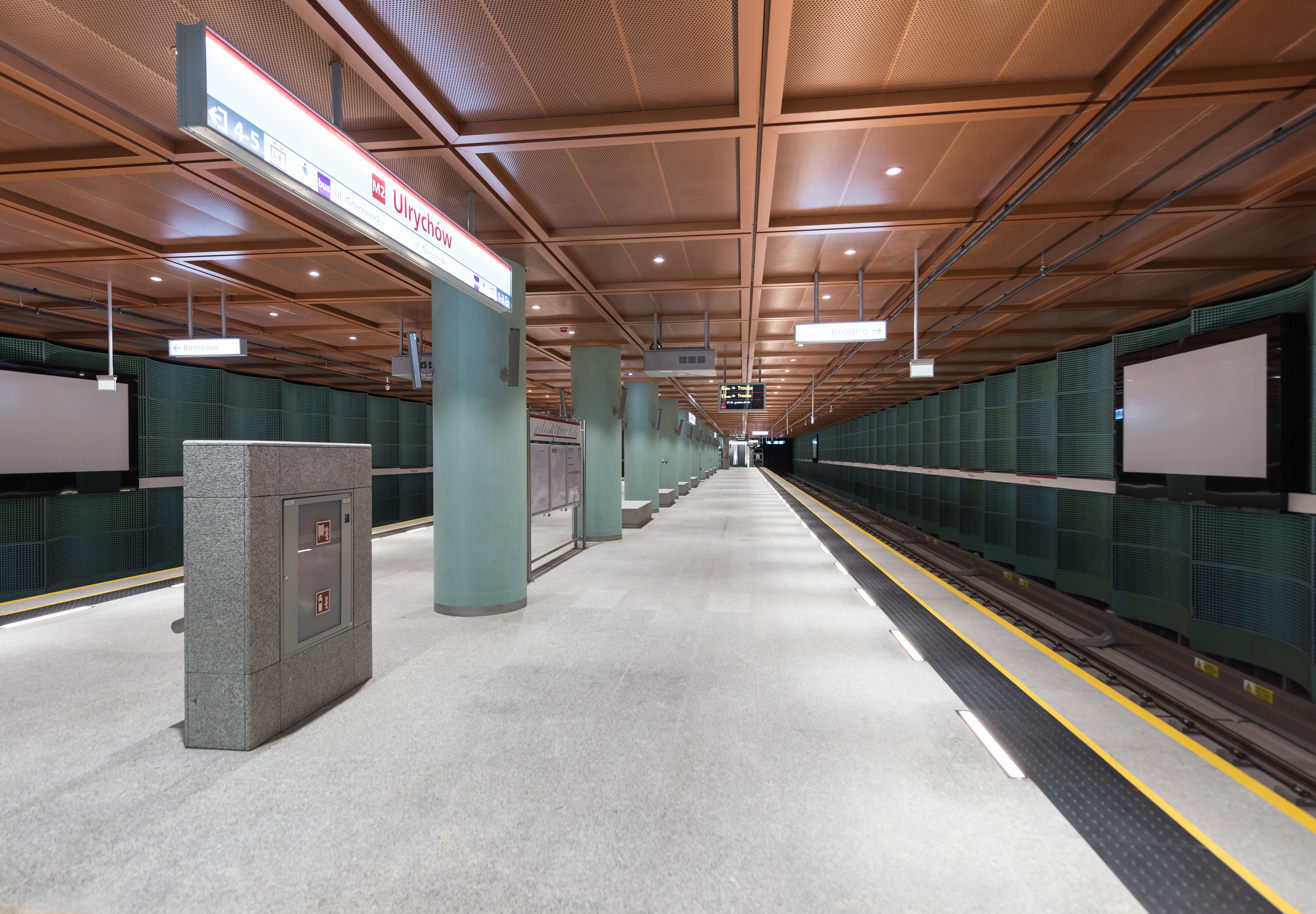

General information
- Coordinates: 52°14′25″N 20°55′48″E
- Owner: ZTM Warszawa
- Platforms: 1 island platform
- Tracks: 2
- Connections: 167, 171, 190, 249, 523; N43; Warszawa Ulrychów (future)

Construction
- Platform levels: 1
- Accessible: Yes

Other information
- Station code: C-5
- Fare zone: 1

History
- Opened: June 30, 2022; 4 years ago
- Former names: Wola Park (In planning phase)

Services
Preceding station	Warsaw Metro	Following station
Bemowo Terminus	M2 line	Księcia Janusza towards Bródno
Location
- Location within Warsaw

Ulrychów is a metro station on the western part of Line M2 of the Warsaw Metro. It is located by Górczewska Street, in the vicinity of the Wola Park shopping mall in Wola district.

== Description ==
The construction of the station began in 2019. It was previously named in design documents as Wola Park.

The station opened for passenger service on 30 June 2022. The station was designed by a consortium of the Metroprojekt and the AMC Andrzej M. Chołdzyński architectural firms. Like the neighbouring station to its west, Bemowo station, Ulrychów station keeps a brick and green-colour theme. The interior walls of the metro station are made out of patinated copper.

The station platform is 160 m in length, and has a cubic capacity of 60 272 m³.

== Connections ==
Warszawa Ulrychów railway station, which is currently under construction, is scheduled to open on 17 January 2027 and will serve as an interchange, which is located around 300 m (980 ft) from Ulrychów metro station via street level.
