= Veturilo =

Bicycle-sharing system in Warsaw, Poland

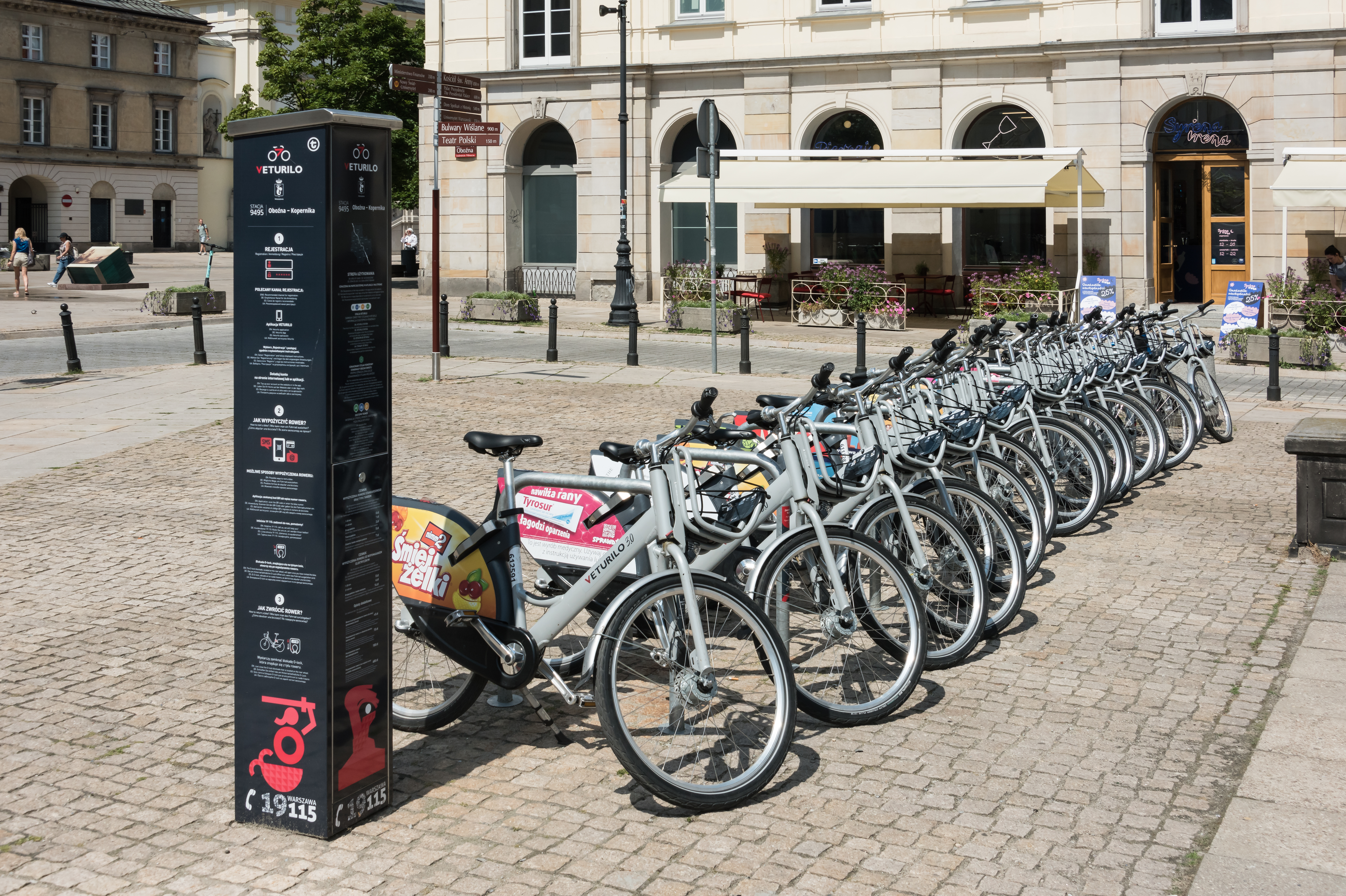
- Veturilo station

Overview
- Locale: Warsaw, Poland
- Transit type: Bicycle-sharing system
- Number of stations: 346
- Annual ridership: ▲3,904,647 (2022)
- Website: veturilo.waw.pl

Operation
- Began operation: 1 August 2012; 13 years ago
- Operator(s): nextbike
- Number of vehicles: 3,460

Veturilo is a public bicycle-sharing system in Warsaw, Poland, launched on 1 August 2012 with 55 stations and 1000 bicycles in 3 districts - Śródmieście (city centre), Bielany and Ursynów, 2 other stations started operating in the middle of August in Wilanów. At the time of the launch, it was the biggest public bicycle-sharing system in Poland and the fifth largest in Europe. It is also considered one of the most successful bike sharing systems in the world.

== Name ==
The name Veturilo was chosen in an internet contest. It is an Esperanto word meaning vehicle. Internet users submitted nearly a thousand proposals, and a jury chose a short-list of six. In the next step, during an internet vote, users chose the name Veturilo (with 32% of votes); other proposals were: Wawabike (26%), Ziuuu (12%), Rowerynka (12%), Bajker (11%) and Wabik (6%).

== Prices ==
Rental prices
Time	Rate (PLN)	
Time	Standard and tandem bicycle	Electric bicycle
Up to 20 min	Free	Free
Over 20 min, up to 60 min	1.00	6.00
Second hour	3.00	14.00
Third hour	5.00	14.00
Fourth and each subsequent commenced hour	7.00	14.00
Exceeding 12 hours	200.00	300.00
As of 10 December 2025. Source:

The Veturilo was compatible with Bemowo Bike, a bicycle-sharing system in the Bemowo district operating in the years 2012–2014.

== See also ==
- List of bicycle-sharing systems
