= Targówek =

- Warsaw District
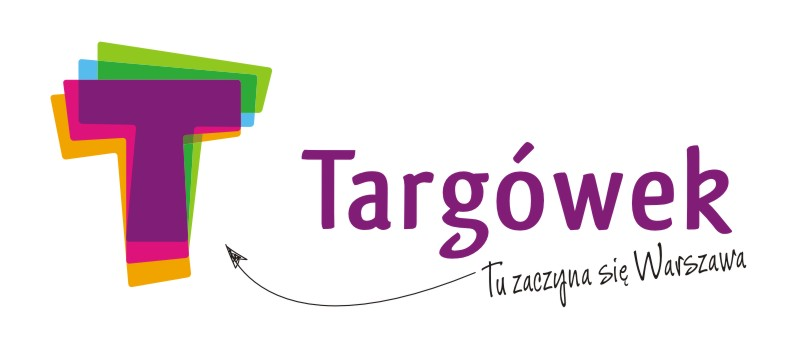
- Flag Coat of arms Brandmark

- Location of Targówek within Warsaw
- Coordinates: 52°16′56″N 21°03′51″E
- Country: Poland
- Voivodeship: Masovian
- County/City: Warsaw

Government
  - Mayor: Krzysztof Miszewski

Area
  - Total: 24.22 km^{2} (9.35 sq mi)

Population (2019)
  - Total: 124,279
  - Density: 5,131/km^{2} (13,290/sq mi)
- Time zone: UTC+1 (CET)
  - Summer (DST): UTC+2 (CEST)
- Area code: +48 22
- Website: targowek.um.warszawa.pl

Targówek (Polish pronunciation: [tarˈɡuvɛk]) is a district in Warsaw, Poland located in the northern part of the city.

It is divided into two parts: residential and industrial. About 30% of the district's area is covered by municipal parks, such as Lasek Bródnowski, Park Bródnowski and Park Wiecha in the eastern part of the district. Between 1994 and 2002 Targówek was independent municipality.

== Borders ==
Targówek borders with Praga Północ from west, with Białołęka from north, with Rembertów, Ząbki and Marki from east and with Praga Południe from south.

== Neighbourhoods within the district ==
- Targówek Mieszkaniowy
- Targówek Fabryczny
- Bródno
- Bródno Podgrodzie
- Zacisze
- Elsnerów
- Utrata
