= Bemowo metro station =

Metro station in Warsaw, Poland

Bemowo
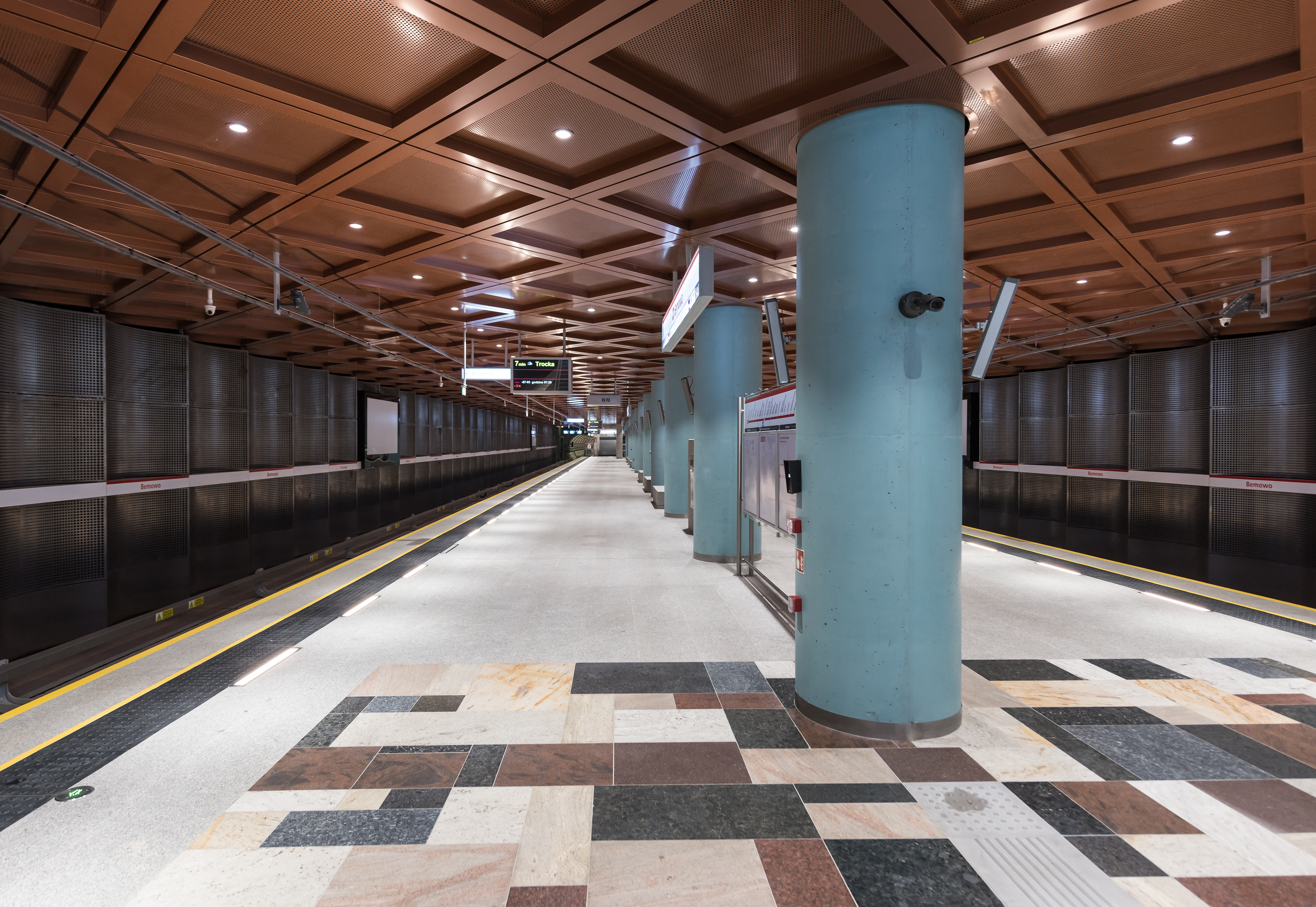

General information
- Coordinates: 52°14′19″N 20°54′37″E
- Owner: ZTM Warszawa
- Platforms: 1 island platform
- Tracks: 2
- Connections: 112, 122, 149, 167, 171, 177, 190, 249, 349, 523, 714, 719, 729, 743; 10, 11, 26, 28

Construction
- Structure type: Underground
- Platform levels: 1
- Accessible: Yes

Other information
- Station code: C-4
- Fare zone: 1

History
- Opened: June 30, 2022; 4 years ago
- Former names: Powstańców Śląskich (In planning phase)

Services
Preceding station	Warsaw Metro	Following station
Terminus	M2 line	Ulrychów towards Bródno
Location
- Location within Warsaw

Bemowo is a metro station on the western part of Line M2 of the Warsaw Metro. It is located in the vicinity of Górczewska and Powstańców Śląskich streets, in the Bemowo district.

== Description ==
The construction of the station began in 2019. It was previously named in design documents as Powstańców Śląskich.

The station opened for passenger service on 30 June 2022. The station was designed by a consortium of the Metroprojekt and the AMC Andrzej M. Chołdzyński architectural firms. Like the neighbouring station to its east, Ulrychów station, Bemowo station keeps a brick- and green-colour colour theme.

The interior walls of the metro station are made out of weathering steel. The station platform is 459 m in length, and has a cubic capacity of 224 586 m³.
