= Bródno metro station =

Metro station in Warsaw, Poland

Bródno
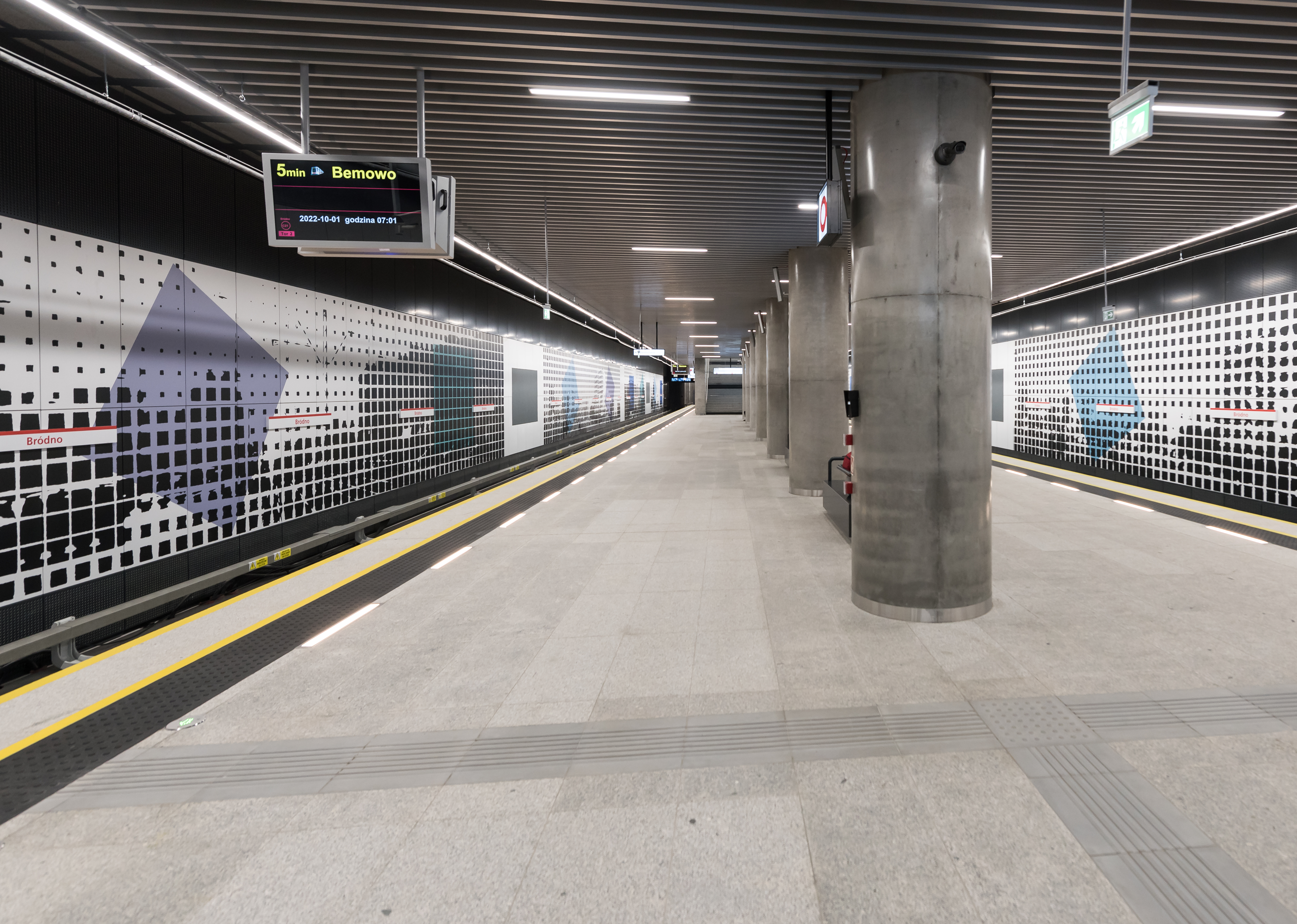
- Platform of the station

General information
- Coordinates: 52°17′37″N 21°01′46″E
- Owner: ZTM Warszawa
- Lines: 104, 112 ,134, 176, 204, 226; N02, N64; 1, 3, 4, 25
- Platforms: 1 island platform
- Tracks: 2

Construction
- Structure type: Underground
- Platform levels: 1
- Accessible: Yes

Other information
- Station code: C-21
- Fare zone: 1

History
- Opened: 28 September 2022; 4 years ago

Services
Preceding station	Warsaw Metro	Following station
Kondratowicza towards Bemowo	M2 line	Terminus
Location
- Location within Warsaw

Bródno is a station on the north-eastern part of Line M2 of the Warsaw Metro. It is located in the vicinity of Kondratowicza, Rembielińska and Bazyliańska streets. The station was opened on 28 September 2022.

== History ==
The construction of the station began in 2019.

The station was opened for passenger services on 28 September 2022.
