= M4 (Warsaw) =

Warsaw Metro line under construction

Overview
- Owner: City of Warsaw
- Locale: Warsaw, Poland
- Termini: Wilanów (planned); Myśliborska (planned)
- Stations: 23 planned
- Website: Metro Warszawskie

Service
- Type: Rapid transit
- System: Warsaw Metro
- Operator: Metro Warszawskie

History
- Planned opening: by 2050

Technical
- Number of tracks: Double
- Track gauge: 1,435 mm (4 ft 8 1/2 in) standard gauge
- Electrification: 750 V DC third rail

The M4 line is the planned fourth line of the Warsaw Metro. It will have a length of approximately 26 kilometers (16 mi) and will consist of 23 stations, linking Wilanów with Tarchomin. It will also include a new metro depot, STP Polfa.

The line will be an important element of the metro network and the overall transport system in Warsaw. According to initial findings, it is expected to be used by up to 30,000 people per hour. It will connect the districts of Białołęka, Bielany, Żoliborz, Śródmieście, Wola, Ochota, Włochy, Mokotów, and Wilanów, as well as enable interchange to M1, M2, M3, and M5 metro lines and the main public transport lines: trams, buses, and railways.

Upon its completion, M4 is planned to be the longest line in the Warsaw Metro system.

== History ==
The line was initially announced in February 2023 by the mayor of Warsaw, Rafał Trzaskowski, in the city's plan to construct five metro lines by 2050.

On March 14, 2024, Warsaw City Council allocated 56 million PLN for pre-design works for the M4 line. On March 19, a tender for the works was issued. In September 2024 the contract for the pre-design works was signed, with the works expected to be finished by 2027.

Construction of the M4 line is expected to take place at the same time as the M3 line, starting somewhere in the 2030s.

== Stations ==
The initial station plan for the line was shared on the Warsaw Metro website:

Code	Name
G01	Wilanów
G02	Sobieskiego
G03	Patkowskiego
G04	Dolina Służewiecka
G05	Wilanowska
G06	Smoluchowskiego
G07	Rondo Unii Europejskiej
G08	Służewiec
G09	Żwirki i Wigury
G10	Wiślicka
G11	Bitwy Warszawskiej 1920
G12	Plac Narutowicza
G13	Plac Zawiszy
G14	Rondo Daszyńskiego
G15	Okopowa
G16	Cmentarz Żydowski
G17	Rondo Radosława
G18	Rydygiera
G19	Marymont
G20	Ruda
G21	Płochocińska
G22	Obrazkowa
G23	Myśliborska
	STP Polfa
