= Stadion Narodowy (disambiguation) =

The Stadion Narodowy (National Stadium) is a retractable roof football stadium located in Warsaw, Poland.

Stadion Narodowy may also refer to the:

- Stadion Narodowy metro station

== See also ==
- Stadion Dziesięciolecia (the stadium that was located on the current Stadion Narodowy's site)
- National stadium (Stadion Narodowy in English)
- Warszawa Stadion railway station
