= Stadion Narodowy metro station =

Warsaw metro station

Stadion Narodowy
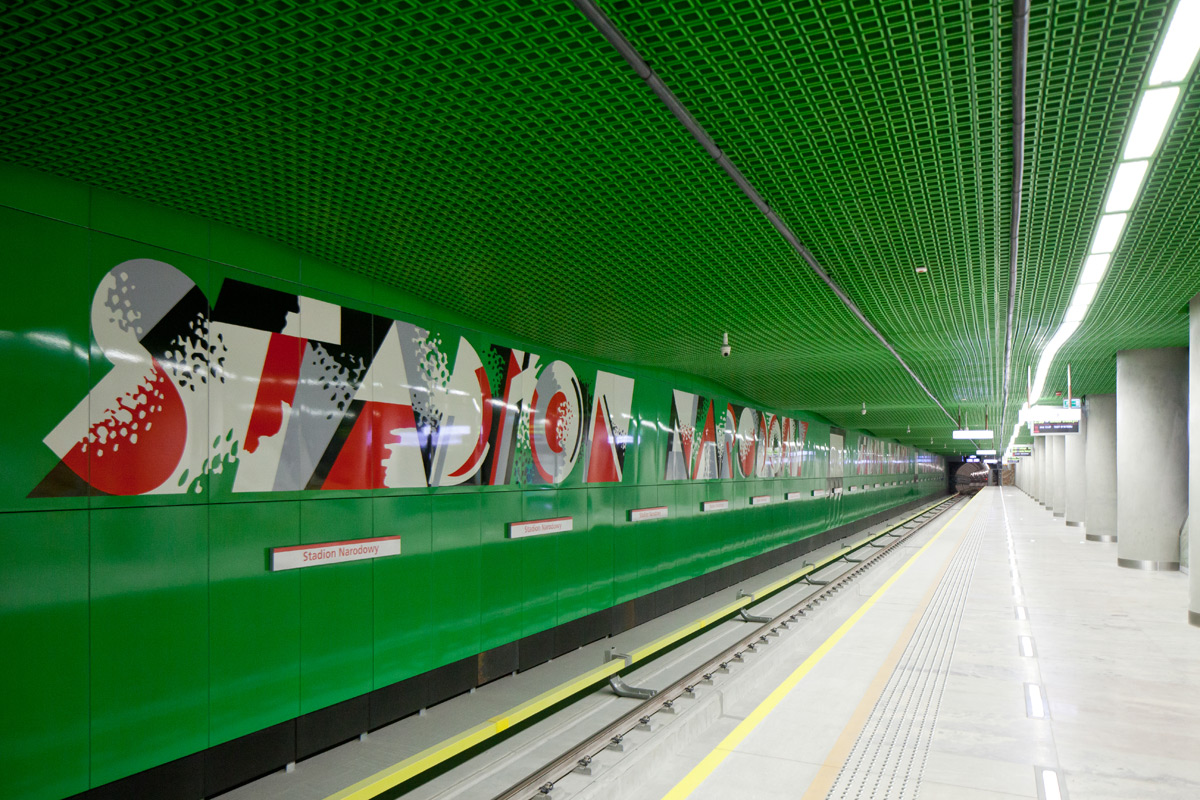

General information
- Other names: Stadion
- Location: Sokola, Praga Poludnie, Warsaw, Poland
- Coordinates: 52°14′45″N 21°02′36″E
- Owner: Public Transport Authority
- Platforms: 2 island platforms (1 in use)
- Tracks: 4 (2 in use)
- Connections: Warszawa Stadion; 102, 125, 135, 146, 147, 202; E-1

Construction
- Structure type: Underground
- Platform levels: 1
- Accessible: Yes

Other information
- Station code: C-14
- Fare zone: 1

History
- Opened: 8 March 2015; 11 years ago
- Former names: Stadion (In planning phase)

Services
| Preceding station | Warsaw Metro | Following station |
|---|---|---|
| Centrum Nauki Kopernik towards Bemowo | M2 line | Dworzec Wileński towards Bródno |
Future service
| Terminus | M3 line | Dworzec Wschodni towards Gocław |
Location
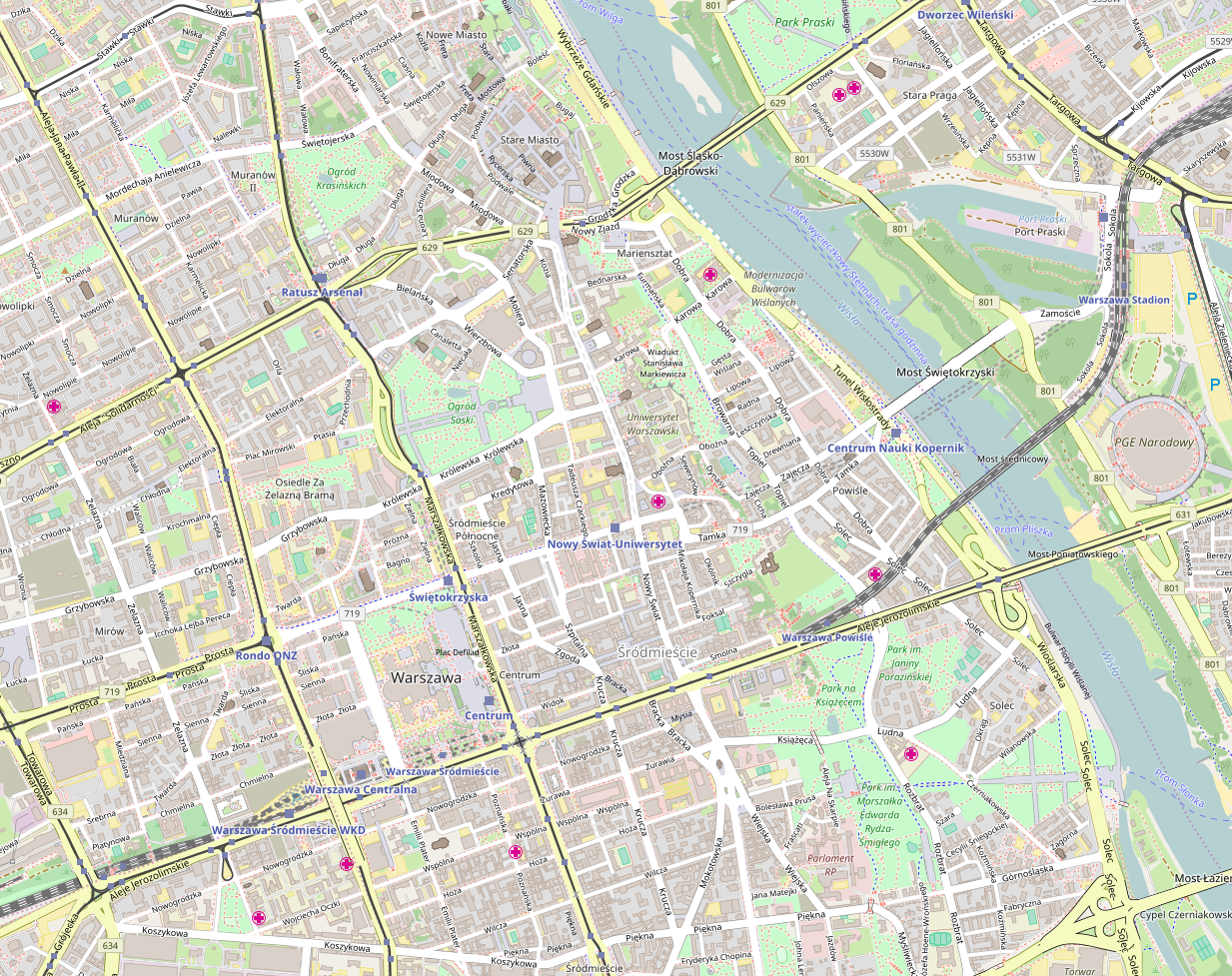
- Location within Warsaw Location within Masovian Voivodeship

Stadion Narodowy is an underground station on the central part of Line M2 of the Warsaw Metro. It is named after the Kazimierz Górski National Stadium (Stadion Narodowy im. Kazimierza Górskiego), which is located in the area.

The station fully opened for passenger use on 8 March 2015 as part of the inaugural stretch of Line M2 between Rondo Daszyńskiego and Dworzec Wileński. It was designed by Polish architect Andrzej M. Chołdzyński and constructed by Metroprojekt. Murals were created by Wojciech Fangor, artist of the Polish School of Posters.

The station was constructed under Sokola street parallel to the Warsaw Stadion railway station, which was refurbished at the same time, with a direct interchange between them.

== Gallery ==
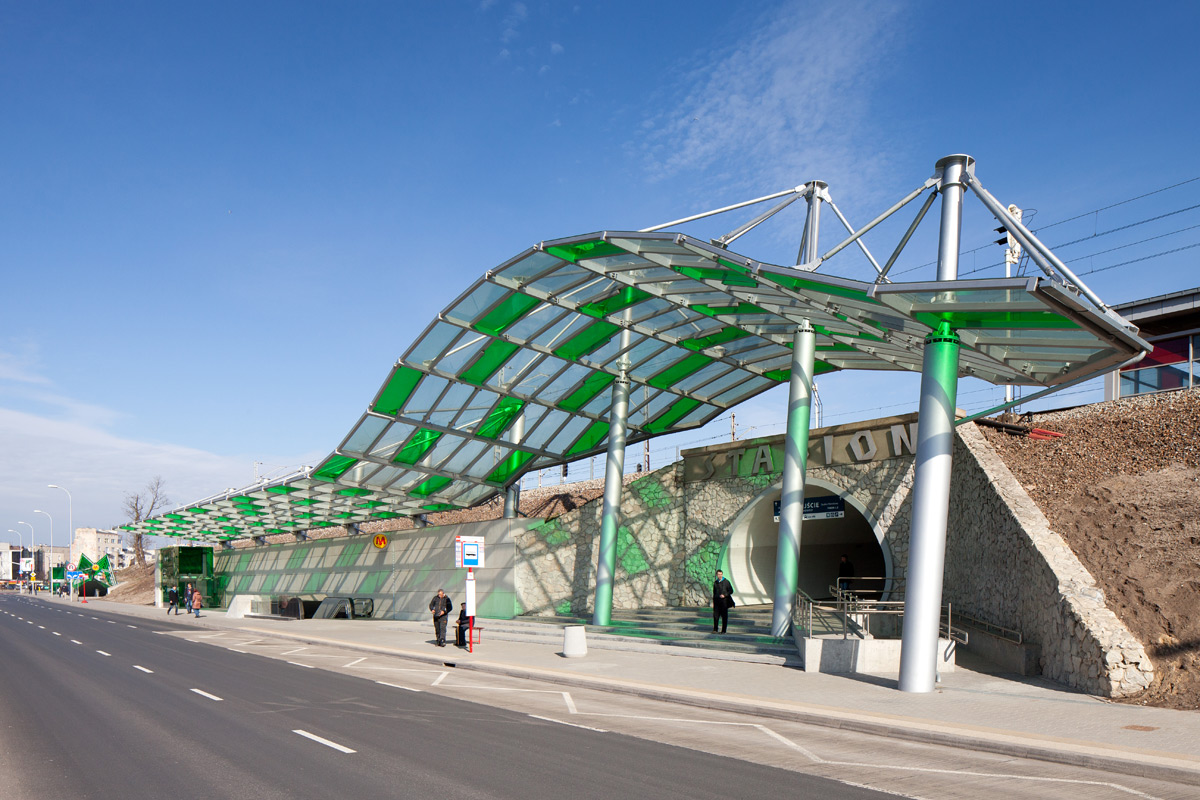
Entrance to the station

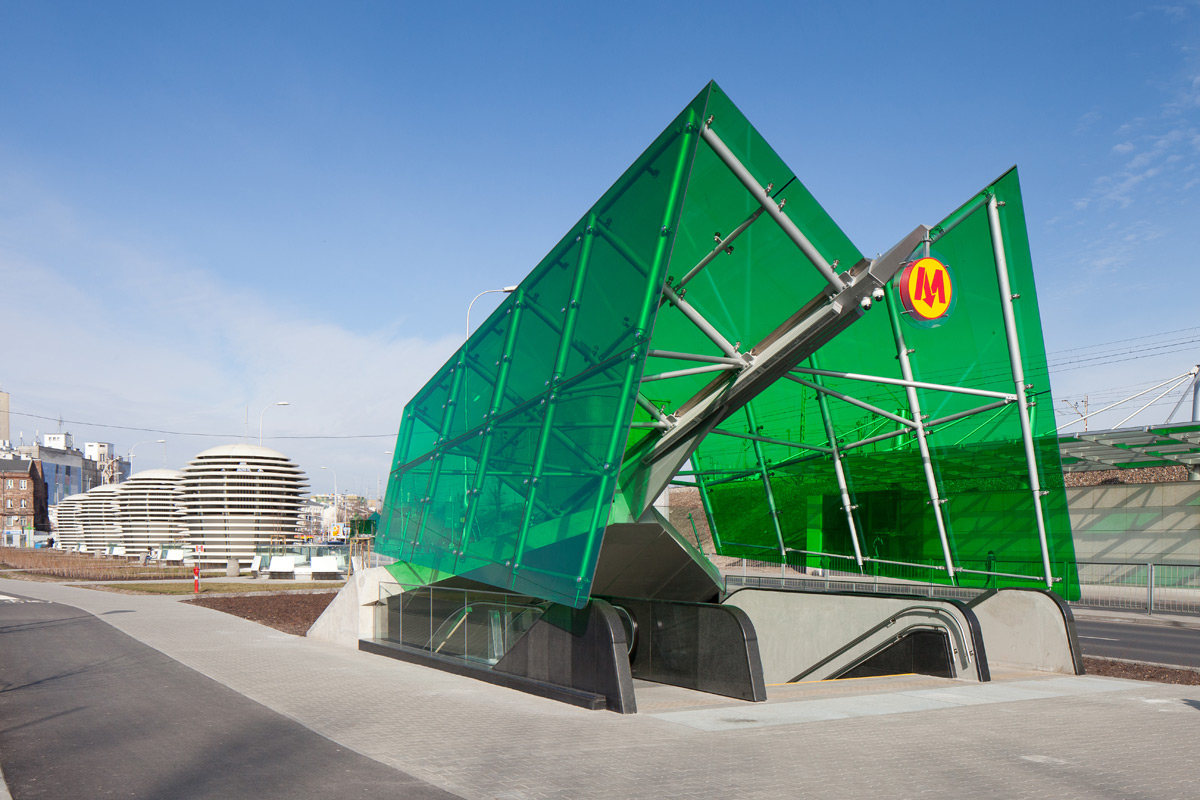
Entrance to the station

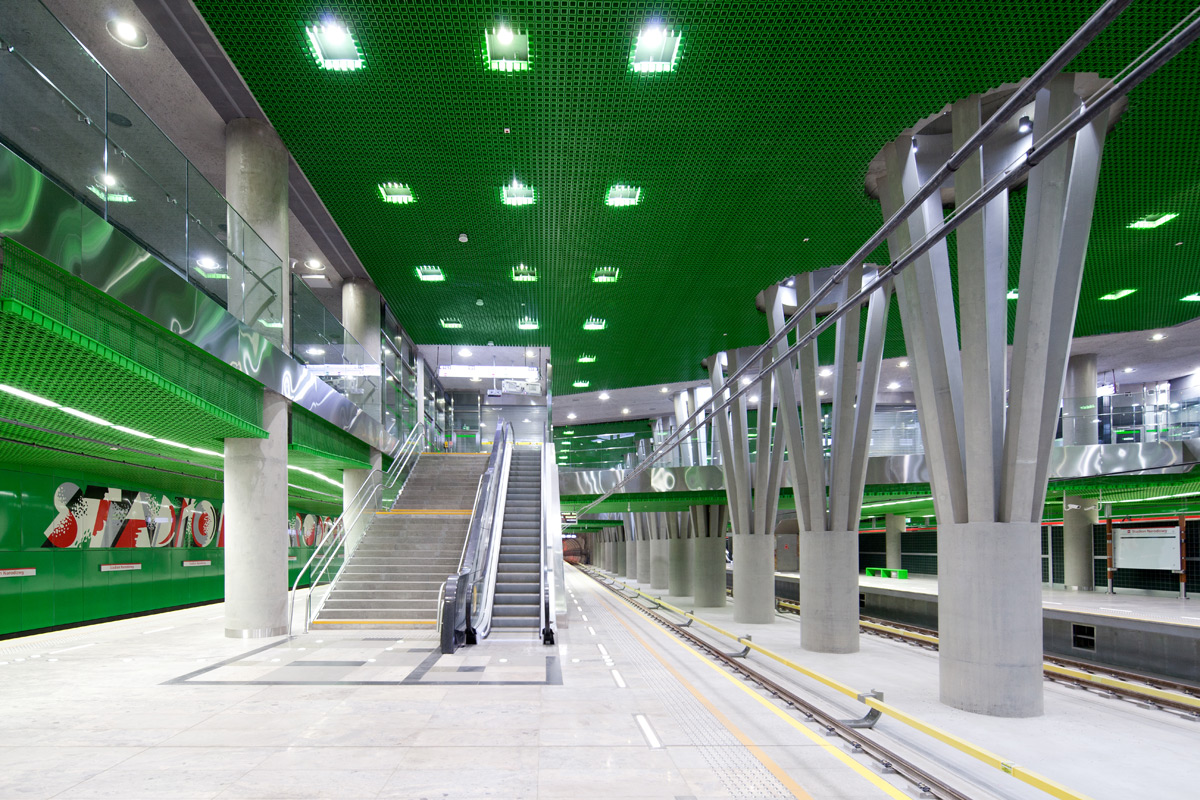
Main platform

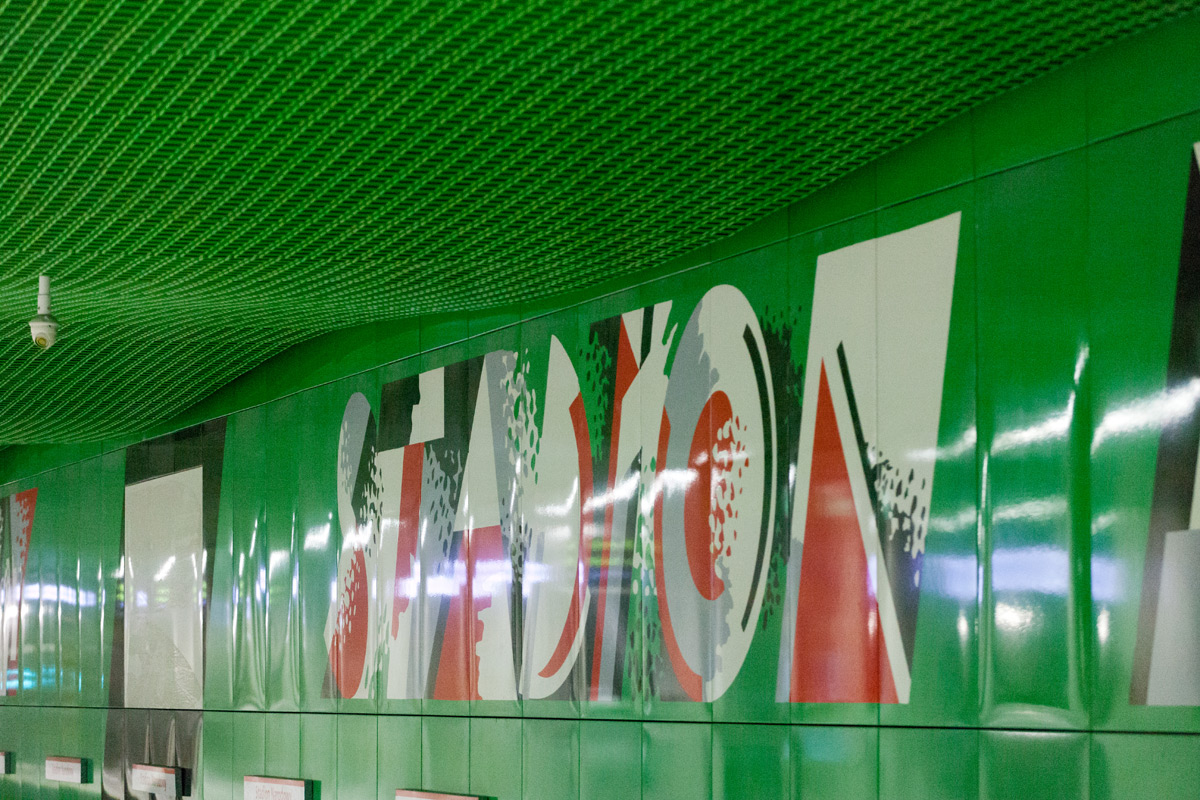
Interior detail, murals designed by Wojciech Fangor
