= Dworzec Wileński metro station =

Warsaw metro station

Dworzec Wileński
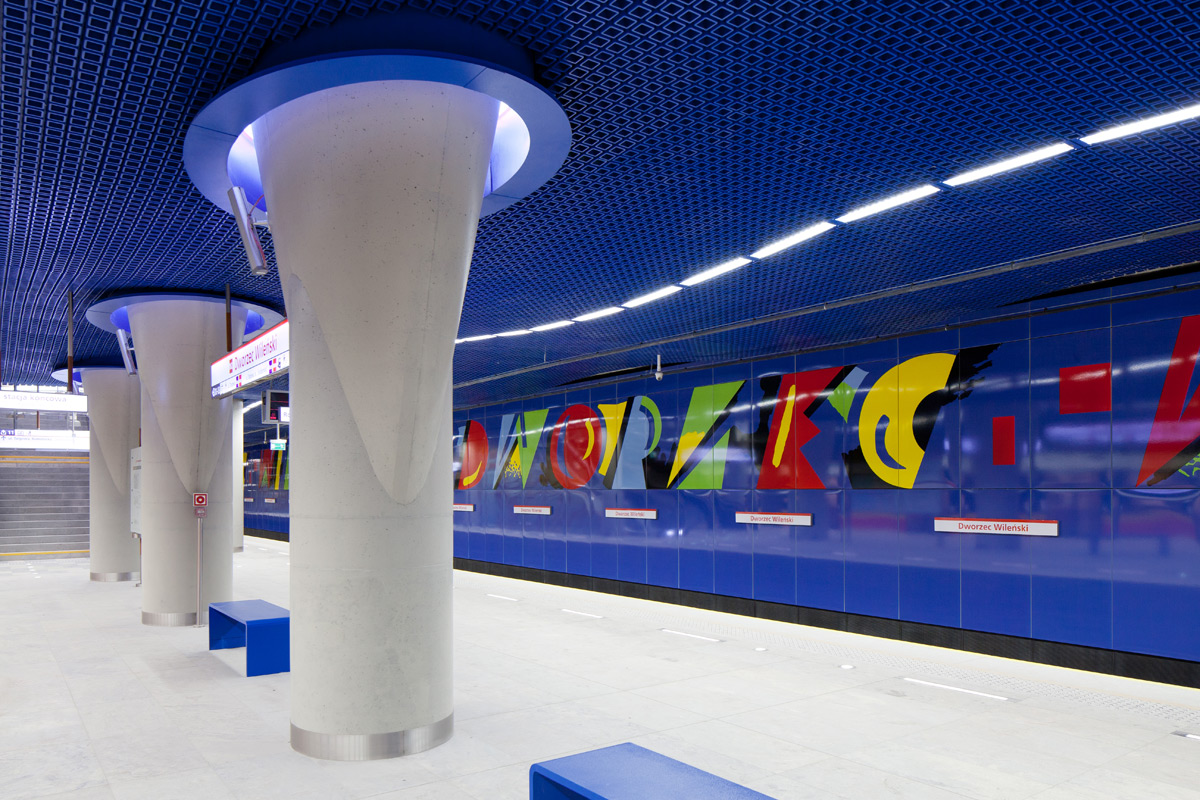

General information
- Location: Plac Wilenski, Praga Północ, Warsaw, Poland
- Coordinates: 52°15′17″N 21°02′05″E
- Owner: ZTM Warszawa
- Platforms: 1 island platform
- Tracks: 2
- Connections: Warszawa Wileńska; 120, 135, 160, 162, 166, 169, 170, 190, 338, 509, 512; N02, N03, N11, N14, N16, N21, N61, N64, N66, N71; 3, 4, 6, 13, 20, 23, 25, 26, 28, T

Construction
- Structure type: Underground
- Platform levels: 1
- Accessible: Yes

Other information
- Station code: C-15
- Fare zone: 1

History
- Opened: 8 March 2015; 11 years ago

Services
| Preceding station | Warsaw Metro | Following station |
|---|---|---|
| Stadion Narodowy towards Bemowo | M2 line | Szwedzka towards Bródno |
Location
- Location within Warsaw

Dworzec Wileński is an underground station on the central part of Line M2 of the Warsaw Metro.

The station fully opened for passenger use on 8 March 2015 as the eastern terminus of the inaugural stretch of Line M2 between Rondo Daszyńskiego and Dworzec Wileński. It was designed by Polish architect Andrzej M. Chołdzyński and constructed by Metroprojekt. Murals were created by Wojciech Fangor, artist of the Polish School of Posters.

The station was constructed under Plac Wileński beside Warszawa Wileńska station, with a direct interchange between them.

== Gallery ==
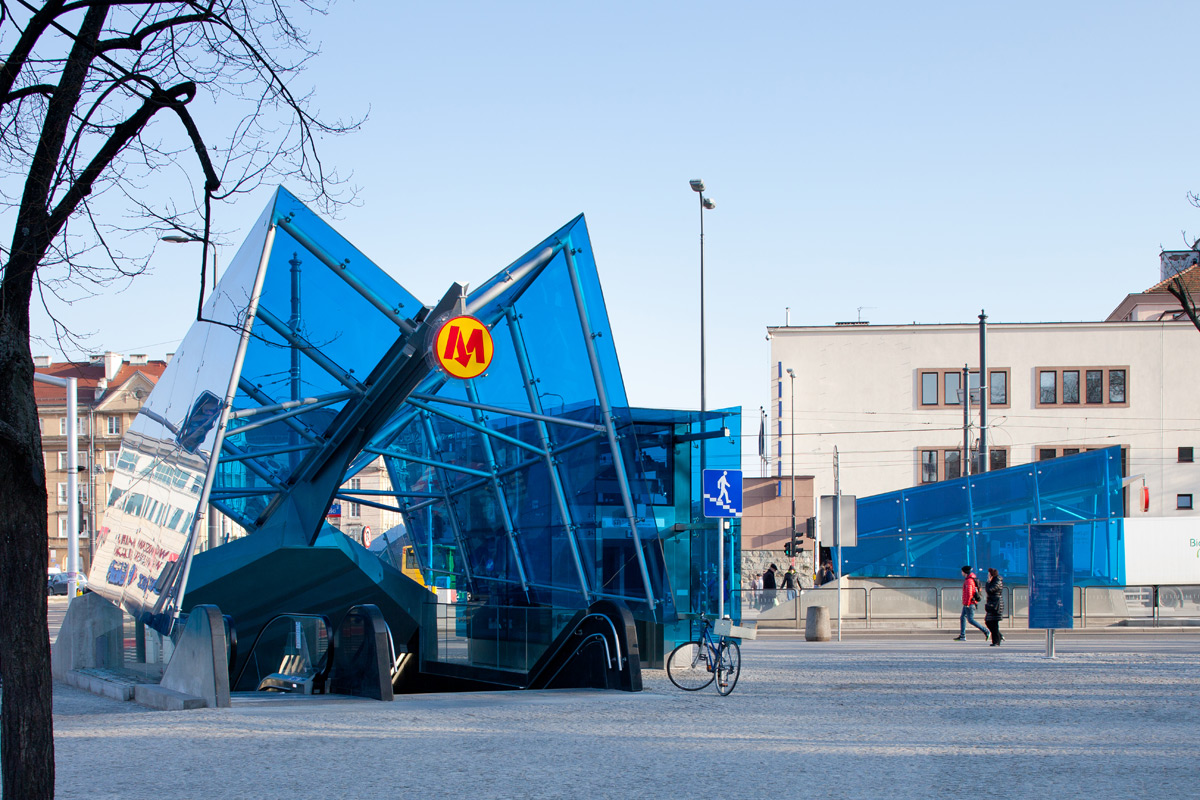
Entrance to the station

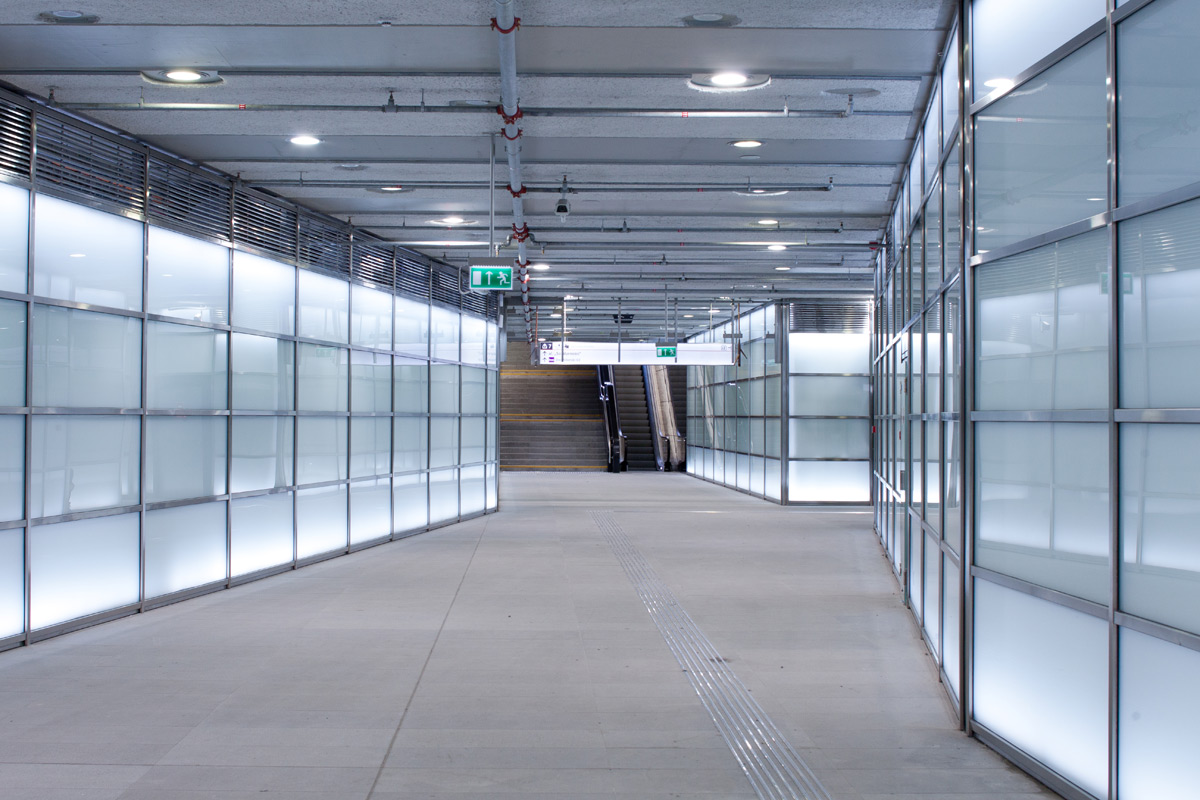
Entrance to the station

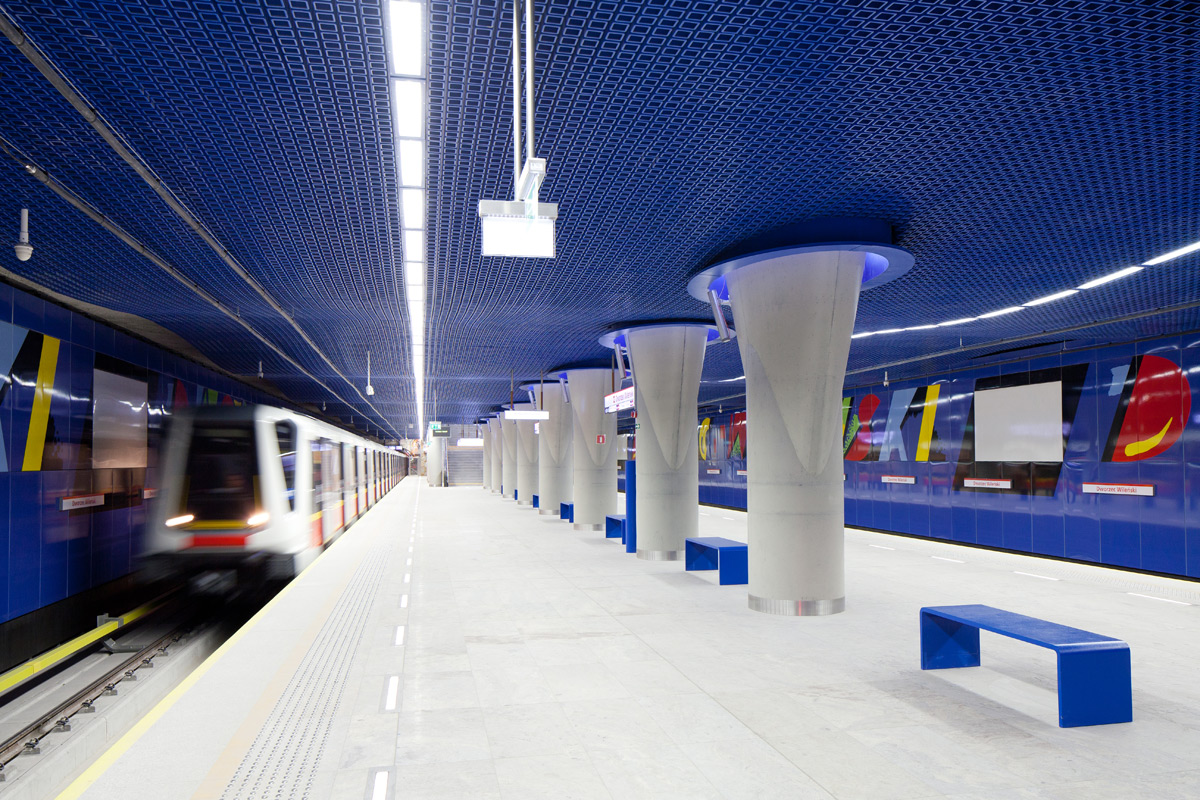
Main platform

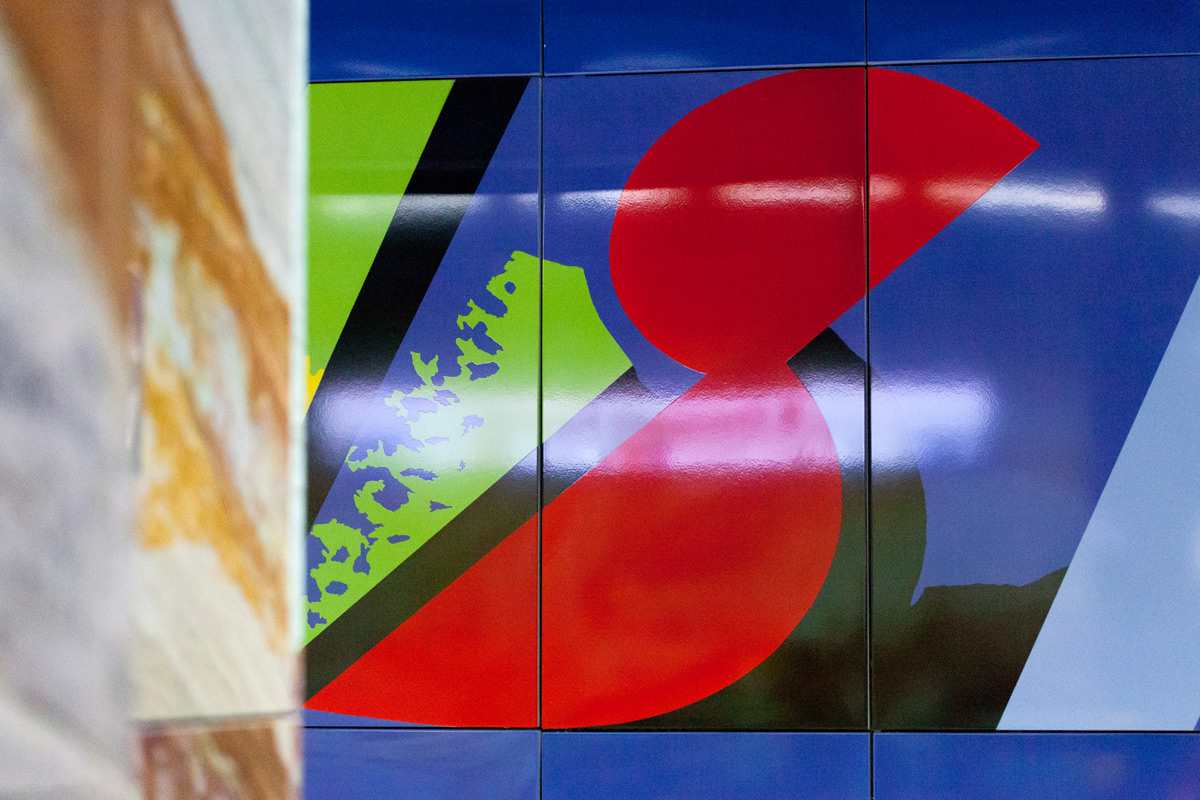
Interior detail, murals designed by Wojciech Fangor
