= M3 (Warsaw) =

Warsaw Metro line under construction

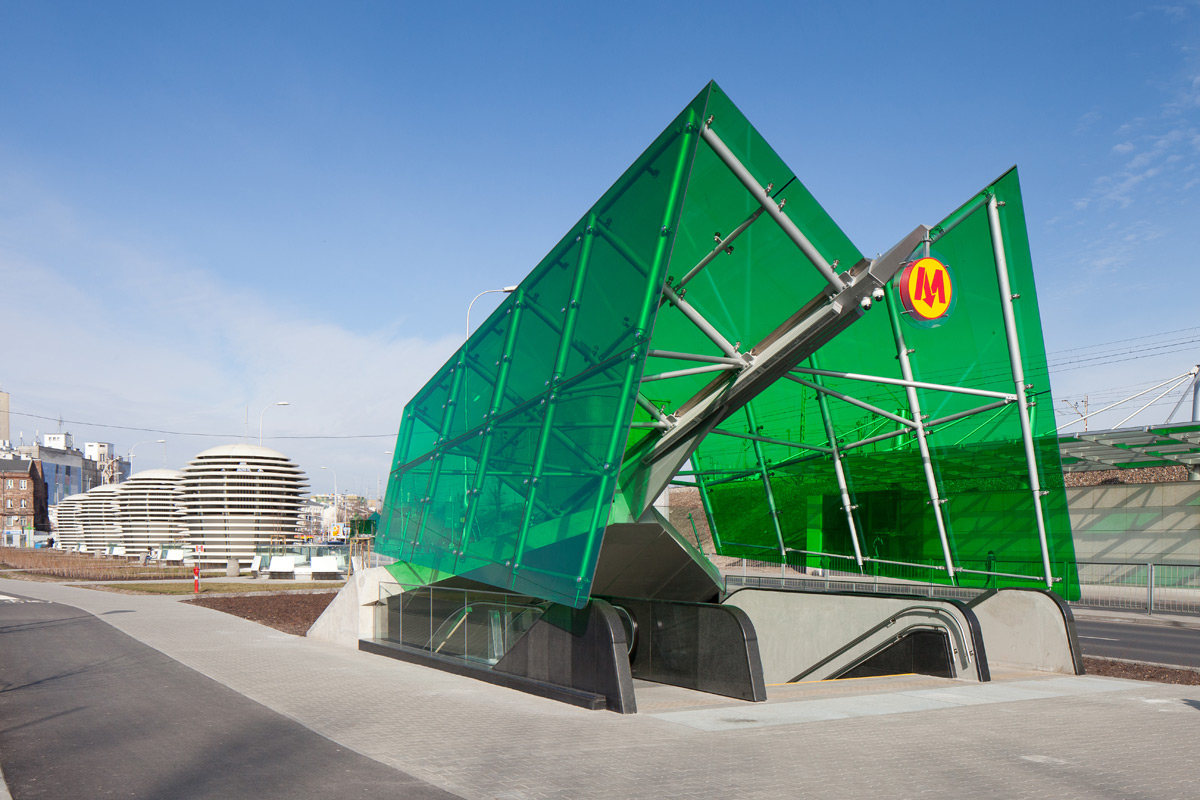
- Entrance to Stadion Narodowy station

Overview
- Owner: City of Warsaw
- Locale: Warsaw, Poland
- Termini: Stadion Narodowy; Żwirki i Wigury (planned)
- Stations: 1, not in use 14 planned
- Website: Metro Warszawskie

Service
- Type: Rapid transit
- System: Warsaw Metro
- Operator(s): Metro Warszawskie

History
- Planned opening: by 2032 (first section) by 2050 (second section)

Technical
- Number of tracks: Double
- Track gauge: 1,435 mm (4 ft 8 1/2 in) standard gauge
- Electrification: 750 V DC third rail
Route map

The M3 line is the planned third line of the Warsaw Metro. The first section will number 7 stations and will link Stadion Narodowy with Gocław.

== History ==
The first plans to construct the metro line emerged in the 1970s and 1980s, with a view to construct M3 between Okęcie and Ochota with Gocław and Julianów. Later on, plans were changed, with the connection shortened to one between Okęcie and Warsaw West railway station. Plans were shortened once again, with the final draft of the line covering stations from the National Stadium to Gocław.

In 2015, Warsaw city authorities planned for the construction of the M3 metro line between Stadion Narodowy and Gocław to commence in 2020. In 2018, Civic Platform's Warsaw mayoral candidate Rafał Trzaskowski declared, if he won the upcoming elections, the construction of the M3 metro line would begin before the end of 2023.

In May 2019, Warsaw Metro declared a tender for completion of a technical study of the route of the M3 metro line, including the construction of the Kozia Górka technical and holding station. The technical study would analyse the proposed route and the preferred location of stations of the first section of the metro line between Stadion Narodowy and Gocław.

On 26 June 2020, the results of the technical study and proposed route were published. The same day, Warsaw Metro announced that the technical study only encompassed the first section of the M3 metro line. The metro line might be extended across the Vistula and link to the M1 metro line around the Racławicka metro station.

The construction of the M3 metro line formally began on 15 March 2021.

== Stations ==
Code	Name	Date	Location
C14	Stadion Narodowy	8 March 2015	Praga-Północ
E01	Dworzec Wschodni	by 2032	Praga-Północ
E02	Mińska	by 2032	Praga-Południe
E03	Rondo Wiatraczna	by 2032	Praga-Południe
E04	Ostrobramska	by 2032	Praga-Południe
E05	Nowaka-Jeziorańskiego	by 2032	Praga-Południe
E06	Gocław	by 2032	Praga-Południe
E07	Gościniec	by 2050	Mokotów
E08	Siekierki	by 2050	Mokotów
E09	Czerniaków	by 2050	Mokotów
E10	Sielce	by 2050	Mokotów
E11	Stary Mokotów	by 2050	Mokotów
E12	Racławicka	by 2050	Mokotów
E13	Wyględów	by 2050	Mokotów
E14	Żwirki i Wigury	by 2050	Ochota
STP3	STP Kozia Górka	by 2032	Praga-Południe
