= Warsaw Metro =

Rapid transit system in Warsaw

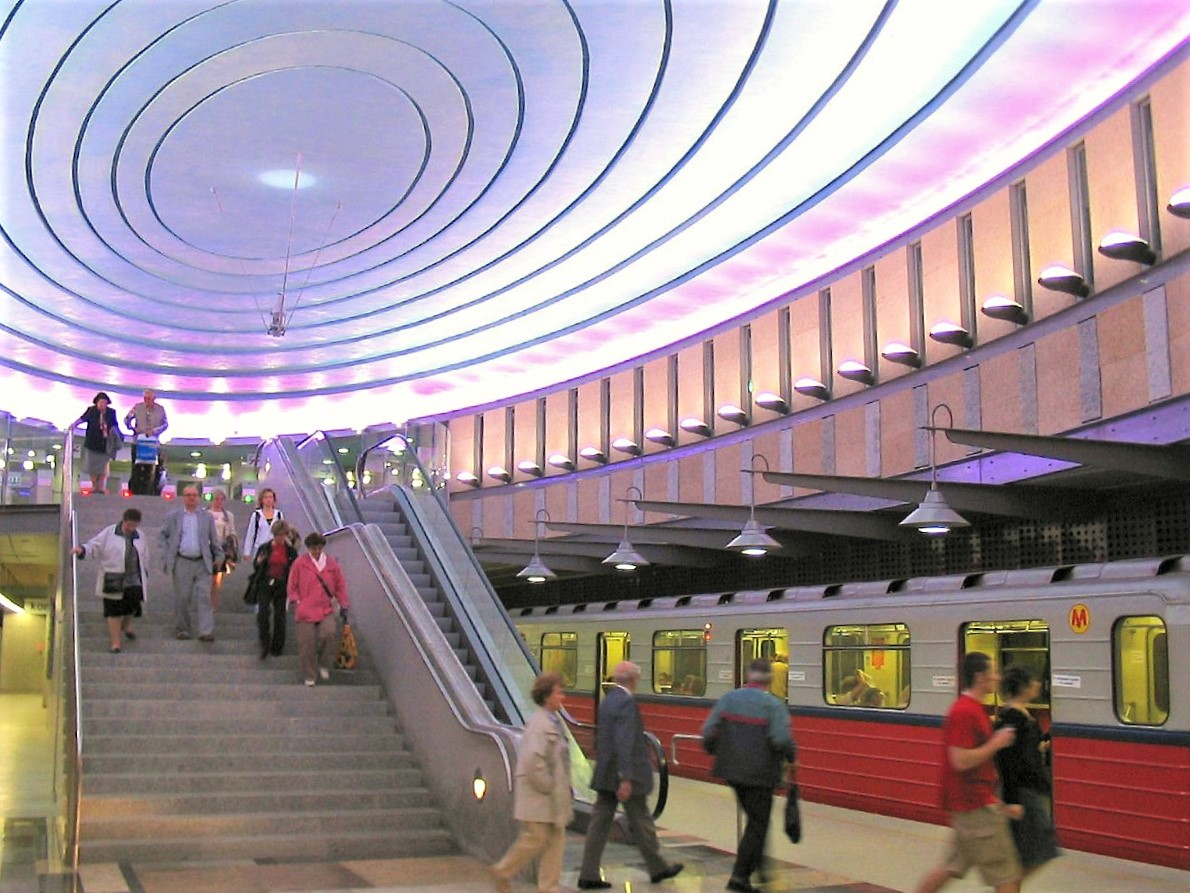
- M1 platform at Plac Wilsona station

Overview
- Native name: Metro Warszawskie
- Owner: City of Warsaw
- Locale: Warsaw, Poland
- Transit type: Rapid transit
- Number of lines: 2 (3 more planned)
- Number of stations: 39
- Annual ridership: 197.3 million (2024)
- Website: Metro Warszawskie; Warsaw Public Transport

Operation
- Began operation: 7 April 1995; 31 years ago
- Operator: Metro Warszawskie
- Character: Fully underground

Technical
- System length: 41.3 km (25.7 mi)
- Track gauge: 1,435 mm (4 ft 8 1/2 in) standard gauge
- Electrification: 750 V DC third rail

The Warsaw Metro (Polish: Metro Warszawskie) is a rapid transit underground system serving the Polish capital Warsaw. It currently consists of two lines, the north–south M1 line which links central Warsaw with its densely populated northern and southern districts, and the east–west M2 line. Three more lines (M3, M4, and M5) are planned. The system is operated by Metro Warszawskie, a municipal corporation, and managed by Public Transport Authority in Warsaw, different municipal corporation. As of 2026, it is the only metro system in Poland.

The first section of M1 was opened in 1995 and the line was gradually extended until it reached its full length in October 2008. The contract for the construction of the initial central section of M2 was signed on 28 October 2009 and construction began on 16 August 2010. The initial segment of M2, measuring 6.3 kilometres (3.9 miles) with seven stations, one of which, Świętokrzyska, includes a transfer between the two lines, was opened on 8 March 2015. The line's further extensions have been opening since 2019, and it is expected to be completed in 2027, when it will have 21 stations.

In February 2023, the mayor of Warsaw Rafał Trzaskowski released a plan for the Warsaw Metro, calling for five metro lines by the year 2050. The plan includes constructing two additional M1 stations, Plac Konstytucji and Muranów, extending M2 line to Marymont and Ursus-Niedźwiadek, as well as construction of three new lines: M3, M4, and M5. With those extensions the metro would directly serve 17 out of Warsaw's 18 districts.

== History ==
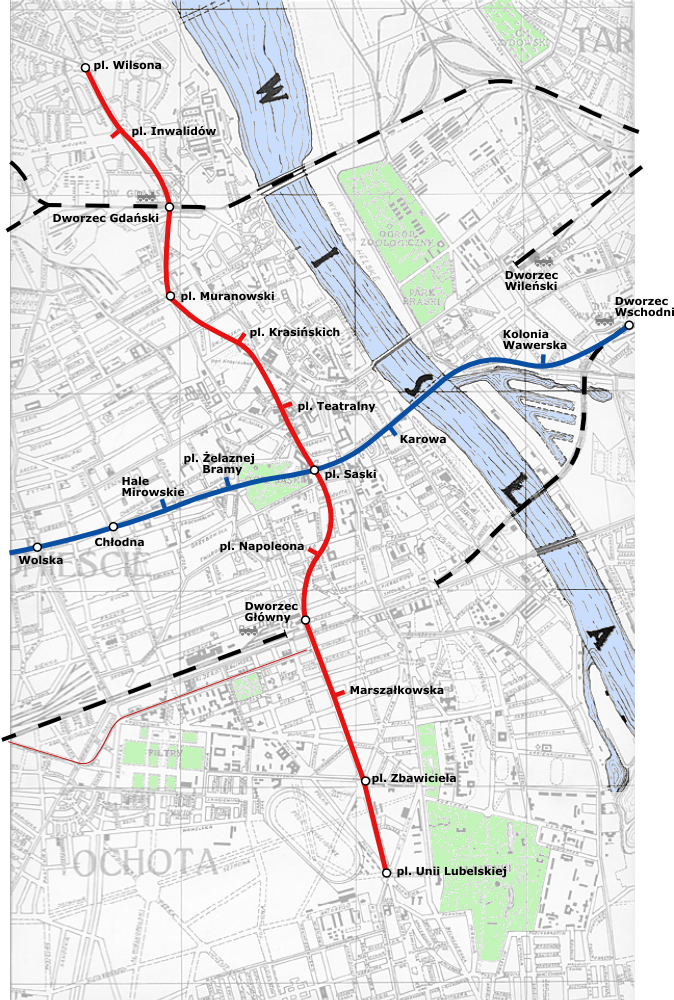
First phase of the planned metro network started in 1938, never completed with the onset of World War II and consequent planned destruction of Warsaw

=== Early attempts (1918-1939) ===
Plans to build an underground rail system in Warsaw date as far back as 1918, when the idea was first proposed after Warsaw regained its status as Poland's capital city. An underground railway system was expected to solve the transport difficulties of the densely built city center. Proper preliminary planning and boring work were initiated by the Warsaw Tramway Authority in 1925, with construction expected to start in the late 1920s. The Great Depression halted those plans as Poland and the world were gripped by economic hardship.

In 1934, with the election of a new mayor of Warsaw, Stefan Starzyński, work was to resume on the metro. The mayor dusted off the plans from the mid-1920s, and with some minor adjustments, construction of the metro was planned to start by the late 1930s, with a projected finishing date of the first of two projected lines scheduled for the mid-1940s. By then, the subway network was to consist of two lines. Line M1 (north–south line, 7.4 km or 4.6 mi long) was to follow a route similar to the present-day line and was to link the southernmost borough of Mokotów with the city center and the northern borough of Żoliborz. This line was to be connected with the newly constructed Warszawa Główna railway station and the railway tunnel crossing the city from west to east. Line M2 (east–west, 6.36 km or 3.95 mi long) was to start beneath the westernmost borough of Wola, proceed along the Chłodna street to the pivotal station beneath the Saxon Square and then further eastwards to the Vistula river escarpment. There, the line was to go overground, cross the river through a newly built bridge and proceed to the easternmost railway station of Warszawa Wschodnia. Altogether, in 35 years, 7 lines were to be built. The works finally started in 1938, but World War II brought an end to the ambitious undertaking. The short trace tunnels made in 1938 serve as a wine cellar today.

=== Post-war plans (1945-1950) ===
The city suffered heavily during World War II. Although the majority of pre-war projects were destroyed during the war, most of the engineers behind their creations survived and returned to their city to take part in its rebirth. However, the new Communist authorities of Poland envisioned a city completely different from what it had been before the war. As the "ideal" communist city, Warsaw was to be decentralized and the need to commute to the city center was reduced. Thus, the Office for the Reconstruction of Warsaw (BOS) commissioned several engineers to prepare a project for a fast urban railway (SKM) crossing the city in a deep cutting. Although to a large extent it was to follow line 1 of the pre-war plans, only the central stations were to be located underground. However, by the end of the decade, the project was cancelled. Instead, in 1948 communist planners developed a different concept with the new SKM morphing into a rapid transit line at a depth of up to 15 metres (49 feet). The suggested north–south direction, with three parallel branches of the same line in the city center, corresponded to the planned development of the city along the Vistula. The works, however, never started and this project was also abandoned.

=== Cold War era tunnels (1950-1957) ===
Revised deep-tunnel metro plan from 1953

In the 1950s, as the Cold War continued, Soviet strategic plans required that a secure transport link across the river Vistula be built. One of the ways to achieve this was to create a deep metro system in Warsaw (pl:Metro głębokie w Warszawie; up to 46 m (150 ft) beneath the ground), which would be interlinked with the rail network and could serve as an underground conduit for transporting troops. Plans assumed that the first line (about 11 km or 7 mi long) would lie along a north–south axis, with a branch of the same line crossing the Vistula river in the city centre. The construction works started almost simultaneously at 17 different points on both sides of the river. By 1953 only 771 m (843 yd) of tunnels had been built; after the death of Joseph Stalin and the start of a period of détente, all work was halted under the pretext of technical difficulties. In the following years, only one junction tunnel and one shield-driven tunnel were continued. These works were undertaken experimentally, to discover the best driving methods suitable for the ground conditions beneath Warsaw (pliocene clay formations layer spread beneath quaternary soils). All work was halted in 1957, and the tunnel eventually flooded in 1960.

=== Current Metro (1983-Present) ===
==== Planning and construction ====
In 1955, planners returned to the old idea of a shallow metro network. However, the planning phase proceeded at a very slow pace and the economic situation prevented all successive governments from actually starting serious work. Finally, in 1983, the program was approved by the government and the first tunnels were built. Lack of funds, technical difficulties, shortage of materials and outdated tunnelling methods meant that the work progressed very slowly, sometimes at a speed no greater than 2 m (6 ft 7 in) per day.

==== Opening ====
The Metro was opened on 7 April 1995 with a total of 11 stations. The initial line, M1, has 21 stations over a route distance of 22.7 km (14.1 mi).

Many of the station name announcements are narrated by Ksawery Jasieński, with some newer stations using recordings by Maciej Gudowski.

==== Newer extensions ====
On 11 March 2016, a 1 billion PLN (€225 million) contract was awarded to the Italian company Astaldi to build the first phase of the north-east M2 extension with 3.2 kilometres (2.0 mi) of track and 3 stations: Szwedzka, Targówek Mieszkaniowy, and Trocka. On 30 April, construction on Szwedzka station started, and on 2 May, the other two stations started construction. Construction of this phase took 3 years, until it opened on 15 September 2019. Initially, this extension was to be built at the same time as the west extension which was due to be completed in 2020. However, due to delays, it was decided that each extension will be built at its own pace. The extension from Rondo Daszyńskiego to Księcia Janusza was opened on 4 April 2020, and the extension from Księcia Janusza to Bemowo was opened on 30 June 2022. On 28 September 2022, the extension of M2 consisting of three new stations: Zacisze, Kondratowicza, and Bródno was opened to the public.

Turkish construction firm Gülermak was commissioned in November 2018 to complete the three western-most stations on the line – Lazurowa, Chrzanów and Karolin.

=== Timeline ===
Segment	Line	Length (km)	Date opened
Kabaty – Politechnika	M1	11.1	7 April 1995
Politechnika – Centrum	M1	1.4	26 May 1998
Centrum – Ratusz Arsenał	M1	1.7	11 May 2001
Ratusz Arsenał – Dworzec Gdański	M1	1.5	20 December 2003
Dworzec Gdański – Plac Wilsona	M1	1.5	8 April 2005
Plac Wilsona – Marymont	M1	0.9	29 December 2006
Marymont – Słodowiec	M1	1.0	23 April 2008
Słodowiec – Młociny	M1	2.6	25 October 2008
Rondo Daszyńskiego – Dworzec Wileński	M2	6.3	8 March 2015
Dworzec Wileński – Trocka	M2	3.1	15 September 2019
Rondo Daszyńskiego – Księcia Janusza	M2	3.4	4 April 2020
Księcia Janusza – Bemowo	M2	2.1	30 June 2022
Trocka – Bródno	M2	4	28 September 2022
Total: 39 stations		41.3 km	

== Metro Warszawskie ==
=== History ===
Metro Warszawskie is a transportation company whose main task is to operate the Warsaw Metro and maintain its infrastructure. The company's history began in 1971 with the Łazienki Route construction, led by the Directorate for the Construction of the Bridge Route – Łazienki. After completion, it reorganized into the Directorate for the Construction of Transport Routes on September 1, 1974. That autumn, the Directorate for Metro Construction was established at 27/31 Gdańska Street to prepare for the M1 metro line. On July 1, 1980, it became a separate unit under the Directorate for the Construction of Transport Routes.

==== General Directorate for Metro Construction (1983–1995) ====
After the Toruń Route construction, most employees of the Directorate for the Construction of Transport Routes joined the General Directorate for Metro Construction, established on February 10, 1983, by Mayor of Warsaw (ordinance no. 7). It acted as the investor and contractor for the M1 metro line, starting construction on April 15, with headquarters at 77/79 Marszałkowska Street.

In 1989, it was appointed as the metro's initial operator. Due to Poland's political and economic changes, the directorate's scope and legal form shifted, and on February 25, 1992, it became an organizational unit of the Association of Warsaw Districts and Municipalities without legal personality (resolution no. 157/92). The first M1 metro section opened on April 7, 1995.

==== Metro Warszawskie (after 1995) ====
On 1 August 1995, a budgetary unit of the City of Warsaw named Metro Warszawskie was established as the successor of Directorate for the Construction of Transport Routes. On 30 December 2002, Sławomir Skrzypek, the Deputy Mayor of Warsaw, issued an ordinance on behalf of the mayor, transforming the company into a private limited company on 1 January 2003. In 2003, the operator also moved its headquarters to 5 Wilczy Dół Street.

=== Activity ===
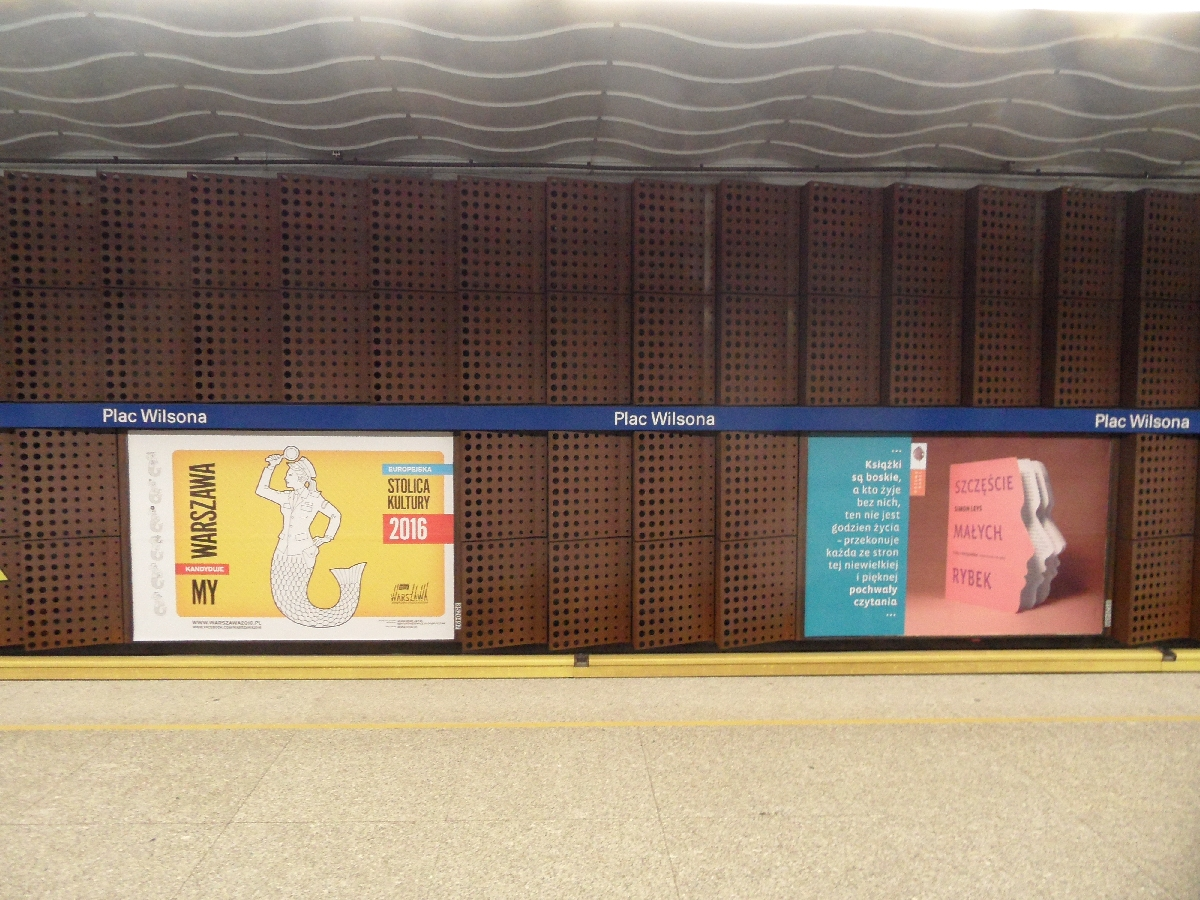
Company's commercial activities – advertising at stations

The company operates the Warsaw Metro, maintaining its stations and tunnels as provided by the city. It earns compensation from the Warsaw Public Transport Authority based on a per vehicle-kilometer rate under a commercial agreement. Additionally, it generates income through commercial and investment activities, including remuneration for overseeing metro network expansion and construction supervision, as stipulated in contracts.

=== Finance and transport performance ===
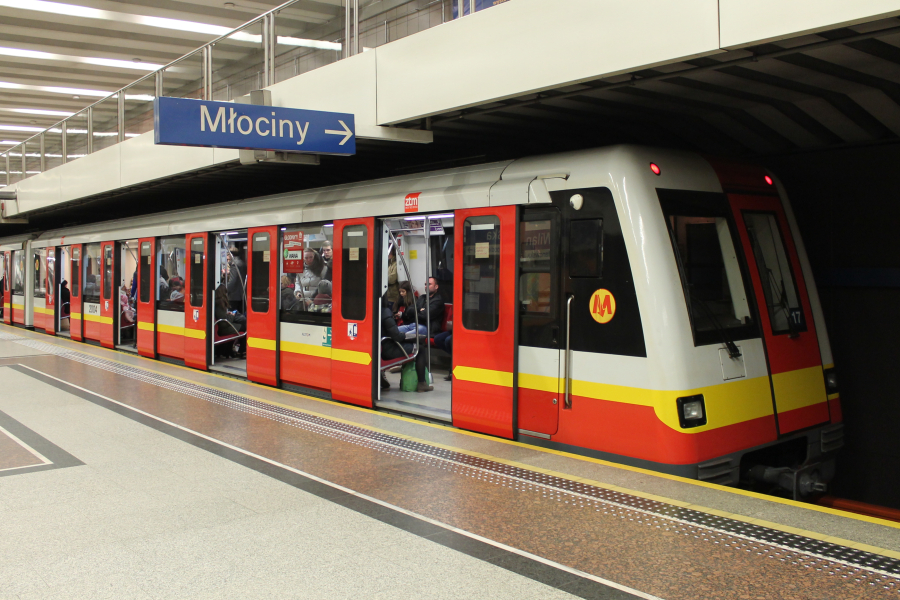
Alstom Metropolis 98B train of Metro Warszawskie

The company's authorised capital was 210 million PLN in 2003, increasing to 328,917,500 PLN by August 2012. Warsaw owns 100% of the shares.

Net profit was 4 million PLN in 2004, dipped until 2006, returned to 2004 levels in 2007, then rose to 14 million PLN in 2008, 5 million PLN in 2009, 15 million PLN in 2010, 5.4 million PLN in 2011, 9.4 million PLN in 2012, a peak of 70.9 million PLN in 2013, 45 million PLN in 2014, 5.3 million PLN in 2015, 9.7 million PLN in 2016, and 25.4 million PLN in 2017.

In 1995, the Warsaw Metro transported 20 million passengers, with annual increases until 2011. A slight drop occurred in 2012, followed by a 5.8% rise in 2013. It transported about 170 million passengers annually in 2015 (680,000 daily) and 183.7 million in 2016.

Train-kilometers were 11.2 million in 2002, peaked at 25.99 million in 2010, declined until 2013, then increased again.

=== Employment ===
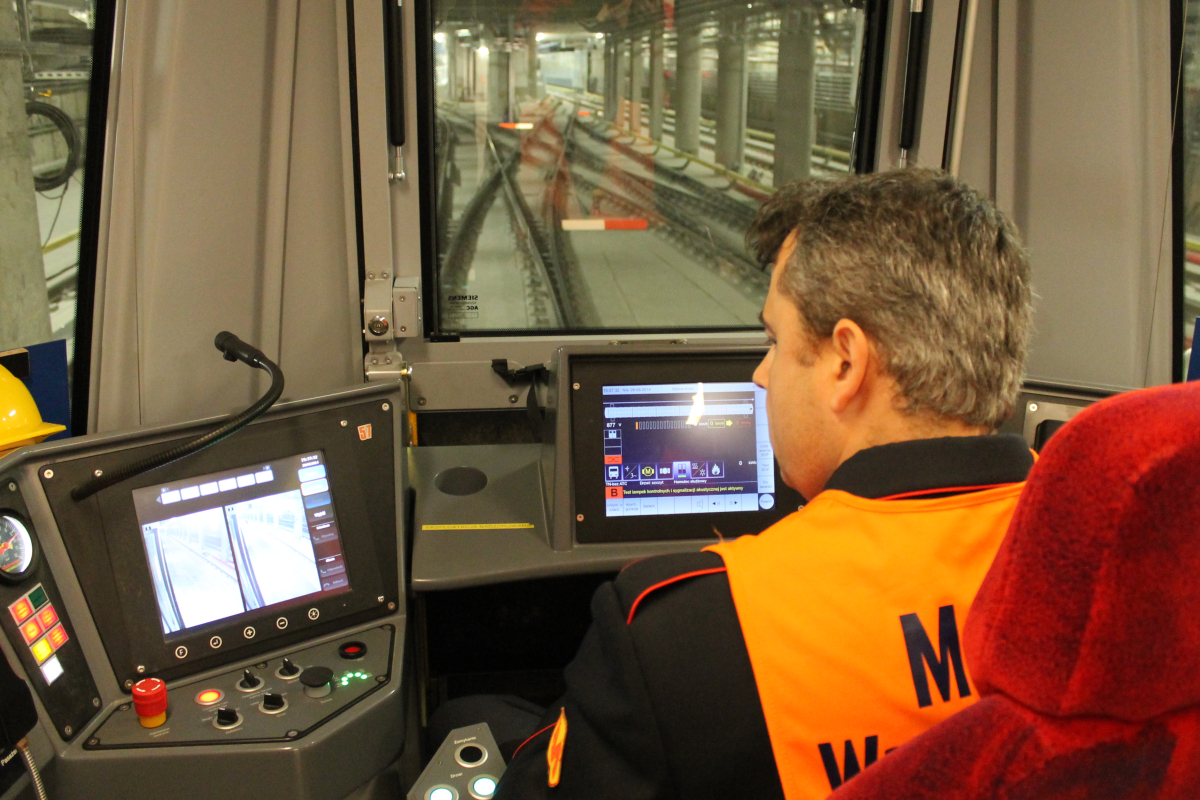
Train driver of Metro Warszawskie in a Siemens Inspiro train

The number of employees at the end of 2003 was 1,128. It increased year by year, reaching 1,634 in 2009, and remained at a similar level in 2010 and 2011. In the following years, the number of employees at Metro Warszawskie rose again, reaching 2,265 at the end of 2015 and 2,353 in 2016.

=== Directors and presidents ===
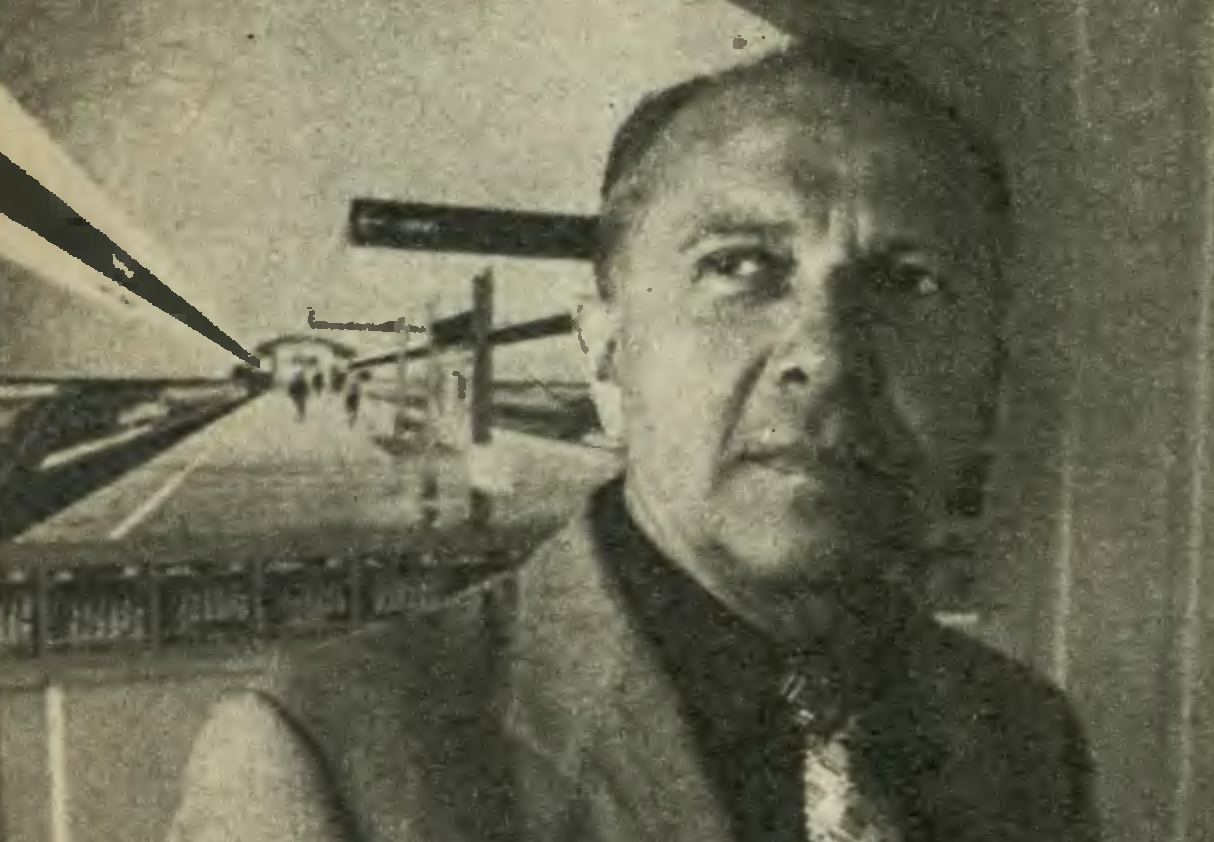
Jerzy Brzostek – first director of Directorate for the Construction of Transport Routes

Jerzy Brzostek was the first director of the Construction of Transport Routes, succeeded by Bohdan Zuń in 1991. Zuń led until the entity became Metro Warszawskie and served as president from January 1, 2003, until his dismissal on January 3, 2003. Krzysztof Celiński then led until mid-December 2005, followed by Jerzy Lejk, who has been president since January 25, 2006.

== Lines ==
The Metro currently consists of two lines, the north–south M1 line, and the east–west M2 line. Three more lines (M3, M4, and M5) are planned.

Map of metro as of 28 September 2022

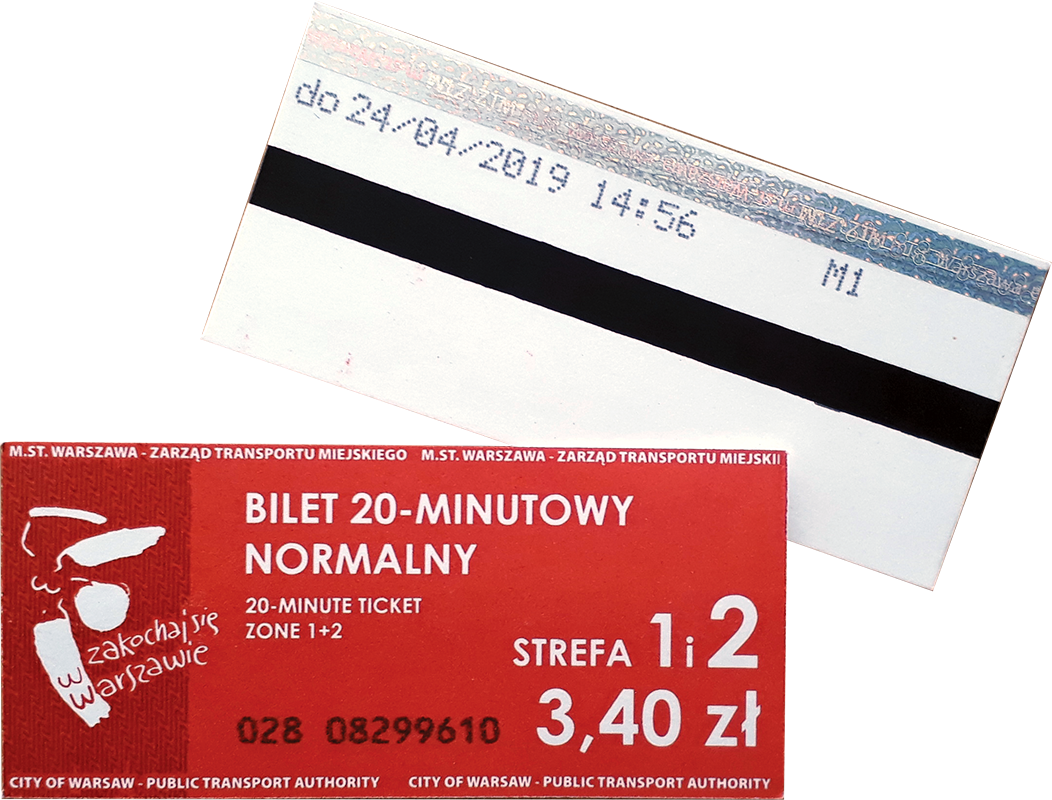
Warsaw Metro tickets

=== Operational ===
Name	Opened	Length	Stations
M1	1995–2008	22.7 km (14.1 mi)	21, 23 planned in total
M2	2015–present	18.6 km (11.6 mi)	18, 28 planned in total

=== Planned ===
Name	Opening	Length	Stations
M3	by 2032 (first section) by 2050 (second section)	8 km (5.0 mi)	1, 15 planned in total
M4	by 2050	26 km (16 mi)	23 planned in total
M5	by 2050	ca. 20 km (12 mi)	20 planned in total

== Rolling stock ==
Annual ridership and number of stations of the Warsaw Metro

Line	Current stock	Image	Introduced	Sets	Length (m/ft)	Seats	Capacity
M1	Alstom (Alstom Metropolis 98B)		2000–2005	18	116.74/383.01	264	1454
M1	Siemens Mobility (Siemens Inspiro)		2013–2015	35	117.7/386	232	1500
M2	Siemens Mobility (Siemens Inspiro)		2013–2015	35	117.7/386	232	1500
M1	Škoda Transportation (Škoda Varsovia)		2022	37	119.01/390.45	230	1500
M2	Škoda Transportation (Škoda Varsovia)		2022	37	119.01/390.45	230	1500

Initially, all of the trains were Russian-built 81-series metro cars. They first arrived in Warsaw in 1990 as a gift from the USSR, five years before the Metro's opening, from the Metrovagonmash plant in Mytishchi near Moscow (model 81-717.3/714.3 - 10 carriages). Subsequent trains arrived from Saint Petersburg's Vagonmash (I. E. Yegorov) Plant in 1994 (81-572/573 - 32 carriages) and an additional 18 81-572.1/573.1 carriages in 1997.

In 1995 the metro began operation with 14 three-car trainsets, with 5 minute intervals between trains during rush hours. With the opening of the extension from Politechnika to Centrum, existing trainsets were extended to four cars with an additional set being added, bringing the total number of sets in service to 15.

In 1998, 108 new carriages of the modern Metropolis family were ordered from the French company Alstom, forming 18 six-car trainsets. These were all delivered by 2005 (24 were produced in Barcelona and the remainder in the Alstom Konstal plant in Chorzów).

In 2006, additional 30 carriages were ordered from Russia to extend the existing 81-series to the target length of six cars, with deliveries taking place up to 2007.

In 2007 five new Russian 81-series trains with redesigned front-ends were purchased, with the contract extended to seven in 2009.

In February 2011, an order was signed with German manufacturer Siemens for 35 complete trains from their new Inspiro line. A large number of these were manufactured in Poland by Newag. The first five trains were put into service in 2013. However, in November 2013 a fire broke out in one of the carriages and for safety reasons all five trains were withdrawn from operation until the cause of the fire was determined. Once the investigation was completed the five new Inspiro trains were placed back into service in March 2014. In 2012, a non-revenue diesel shunting locomotive, classified as ZPS LM-400.00, was manufactured by Zakład Pojazdów Szynowych in Stargard, designed especially for shunting Inspiro trains at the Kabaty depot.

By 2020, the Siemens Inspiro formed the majority of the operating rolling stock.

Originally the 81-series and Alstom Metropolis trains were painted in two horizontal stripes of equal width, the upper one white and the lower one red, with a blue bar identifying the M1 line between them. For the Simens Inspiro a livery with a yellow and red stripe under the windows was chosen in order to resemble the color scheme of the surface public transport taken from the flag of Warsaw. Subsequently the older trains have had the blue bar recolored to yellow during their next scheduled refurbishment.

In January 2020, Škoda Transportation was awarded a new contract for 37 new, open-gangway trains, named the Varsovia. The first EMU arrived in Warsaw on April 25, 2022, with the first revenue service being in October on the M1 line.

With the delivery of the Škoda Varsovia the obsolete 81-series is being gradually retired, units in good technical condition have been donated for spare parts to Kyiv and Kharkiv, where trains of the type are still common. A single trainset of this is to be kept in working order as a museum exhibit and seasonal operation while 3 others remain in Warsaw for spare parts.

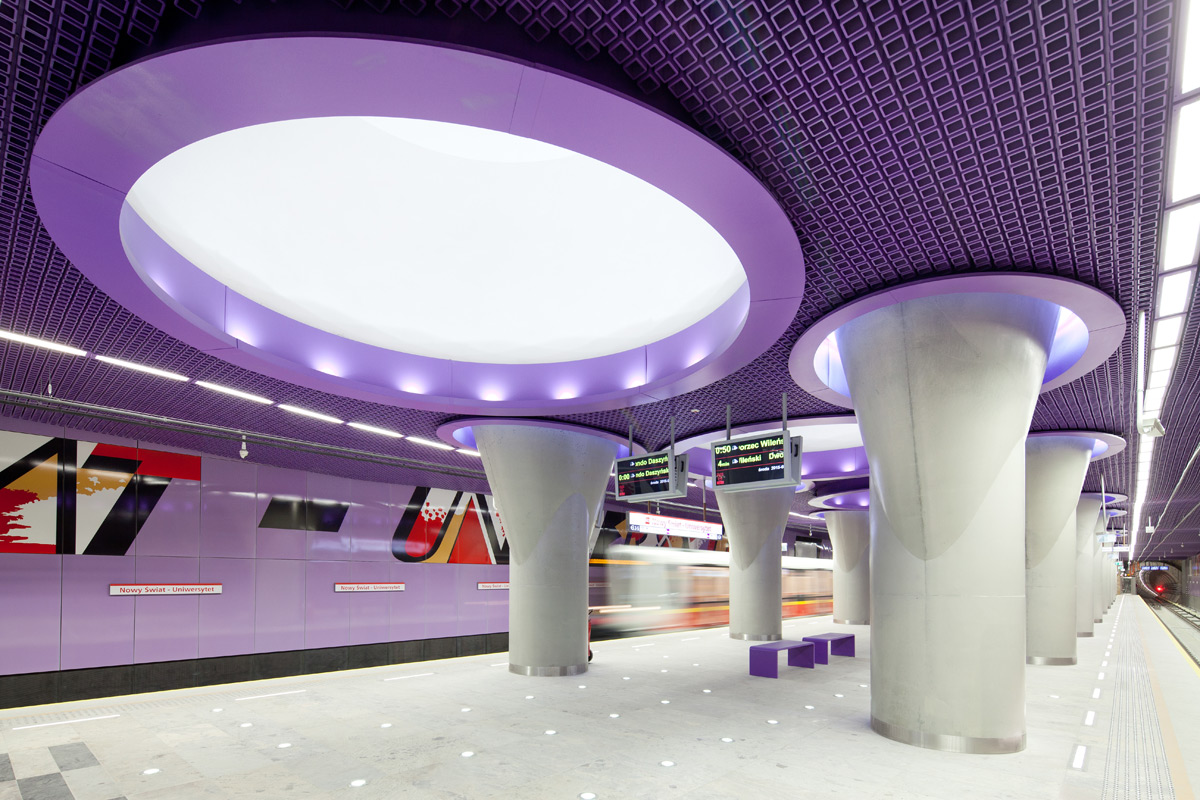
Nowy Świat-Uniwersytet Station, M2

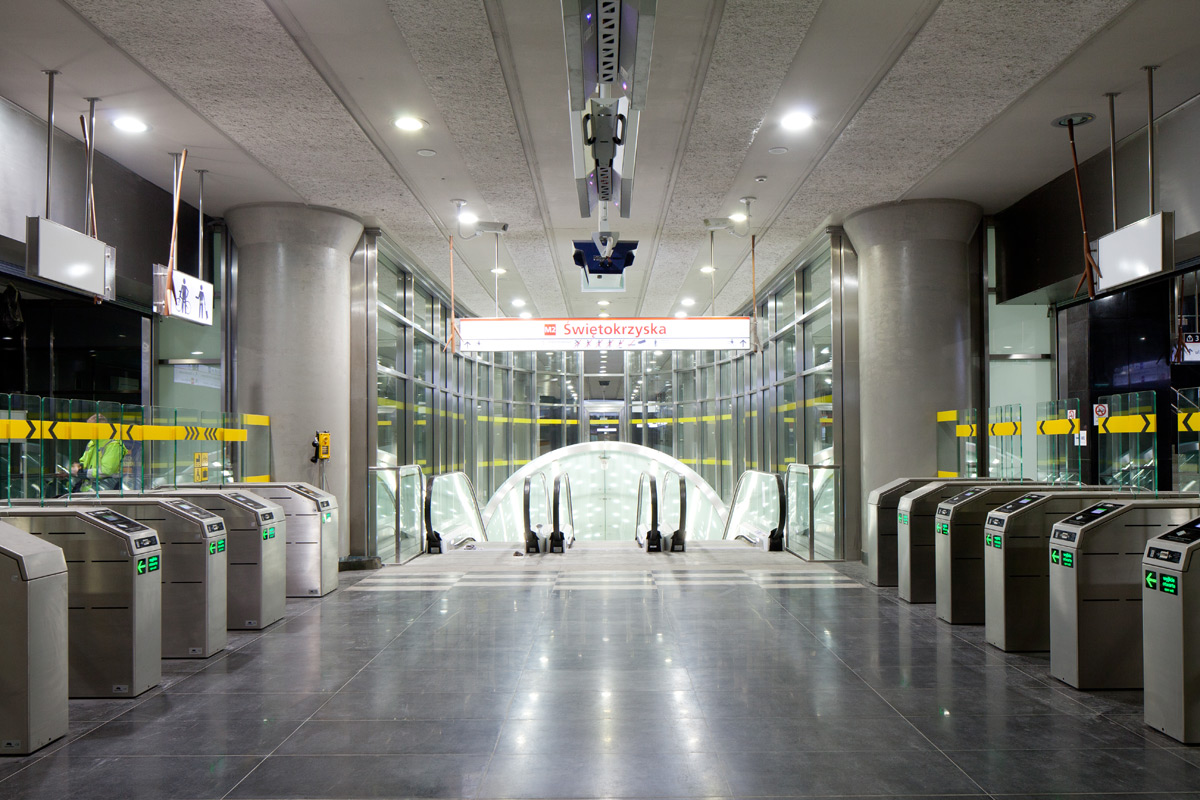
Świętokrzyska Station, M2

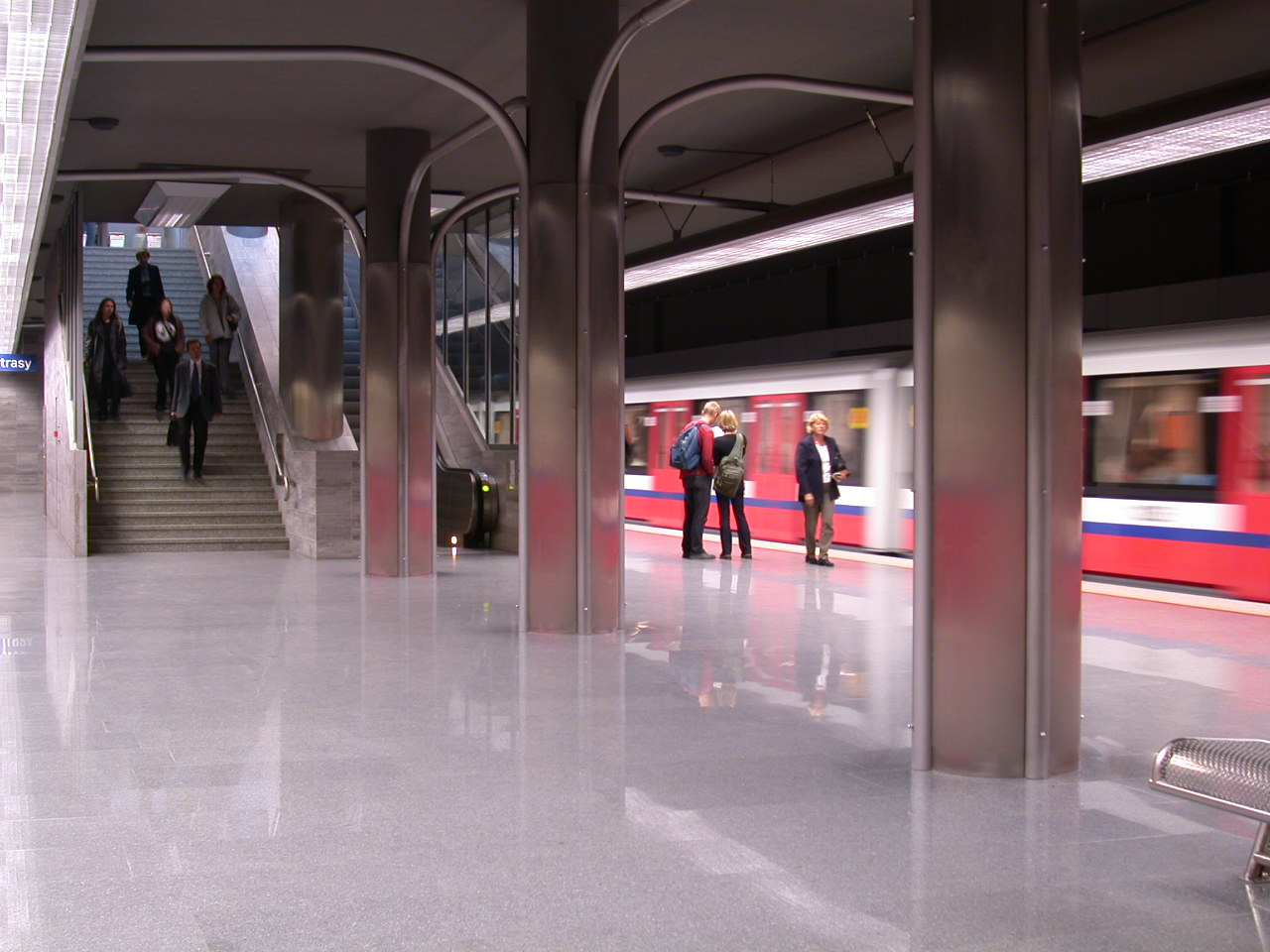
Ratusz Arsenał Station, M1

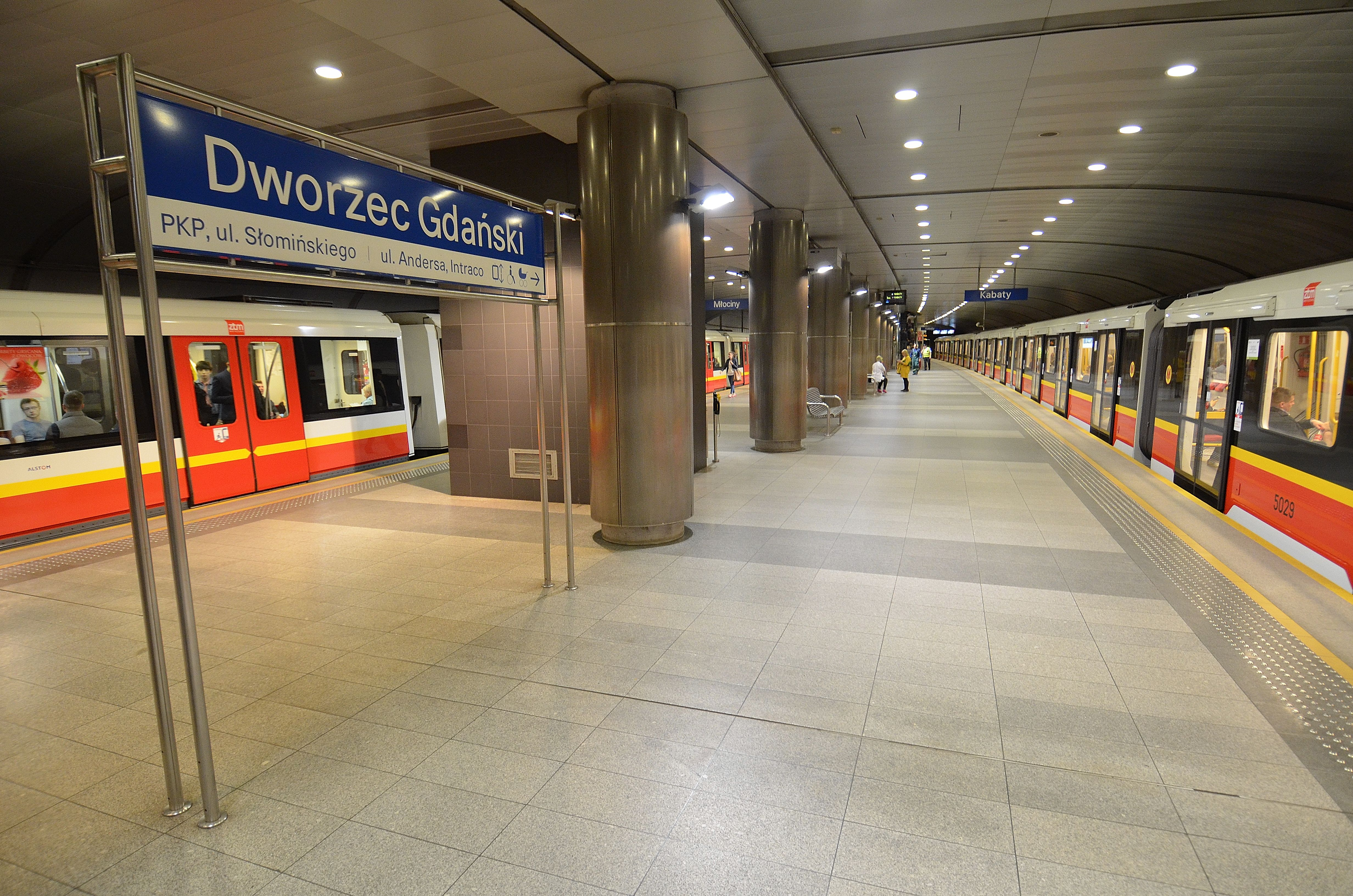
Dworzec Gdański Station, M1

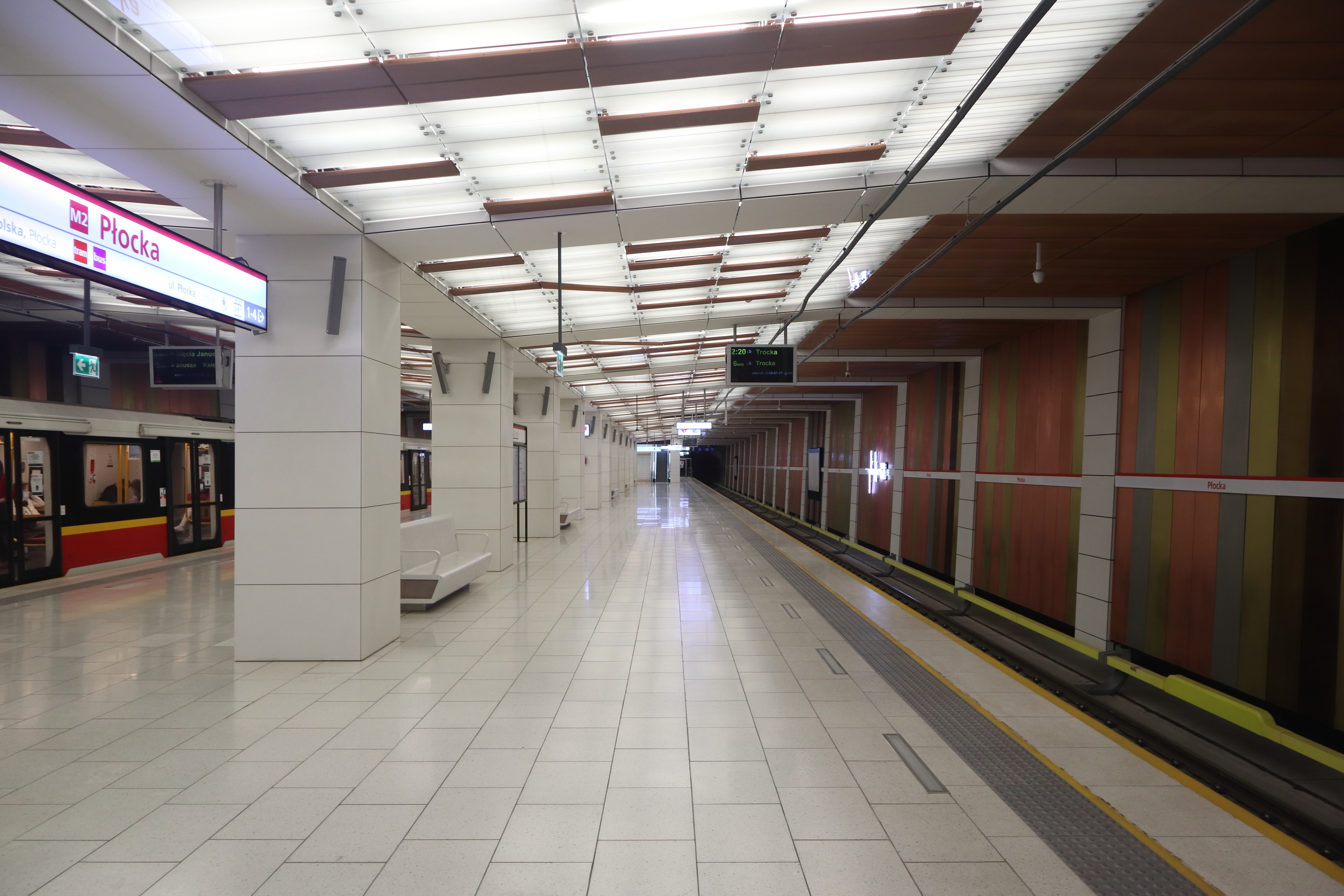
Płocka Station, M2

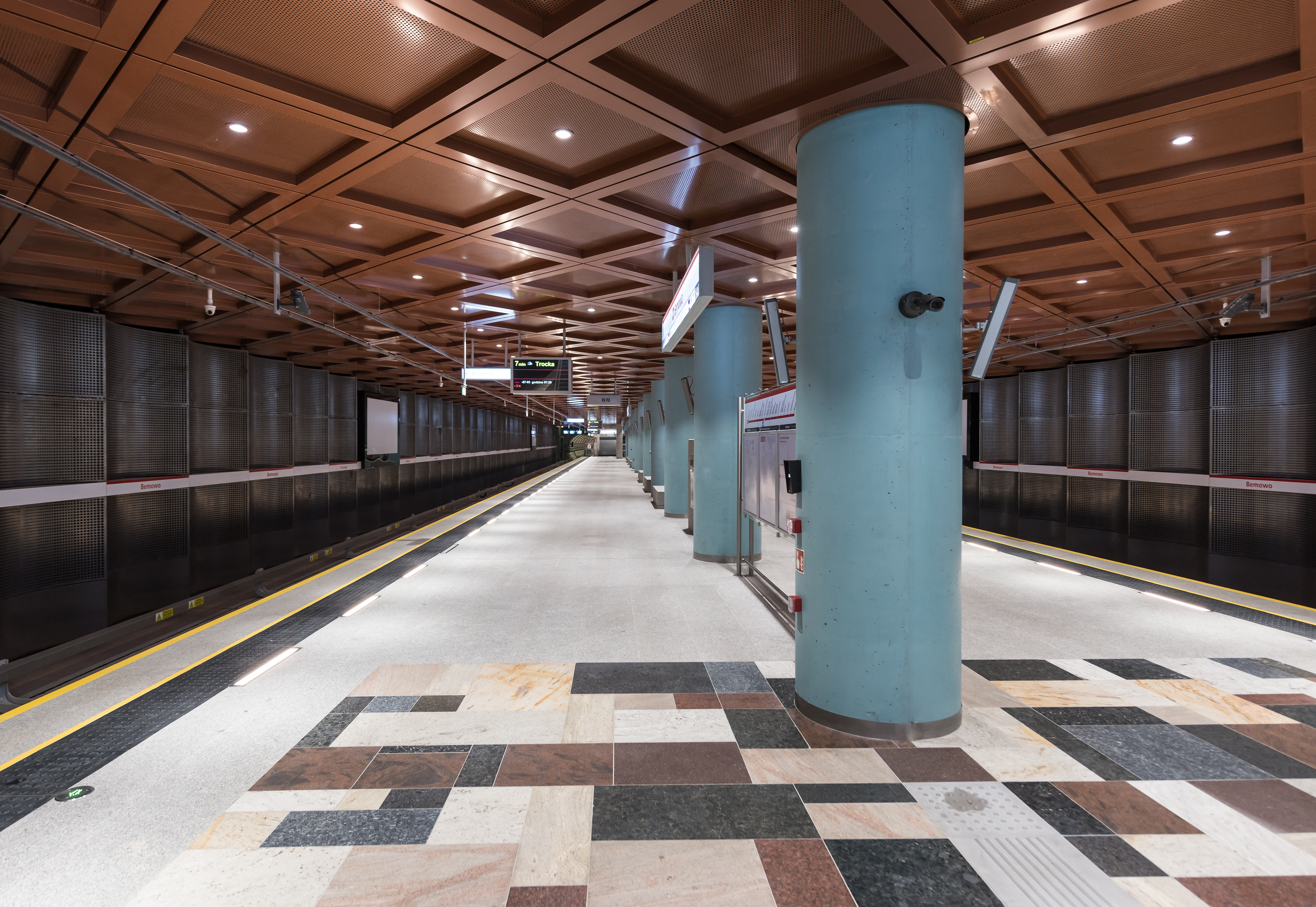
Bemowo Station, M2

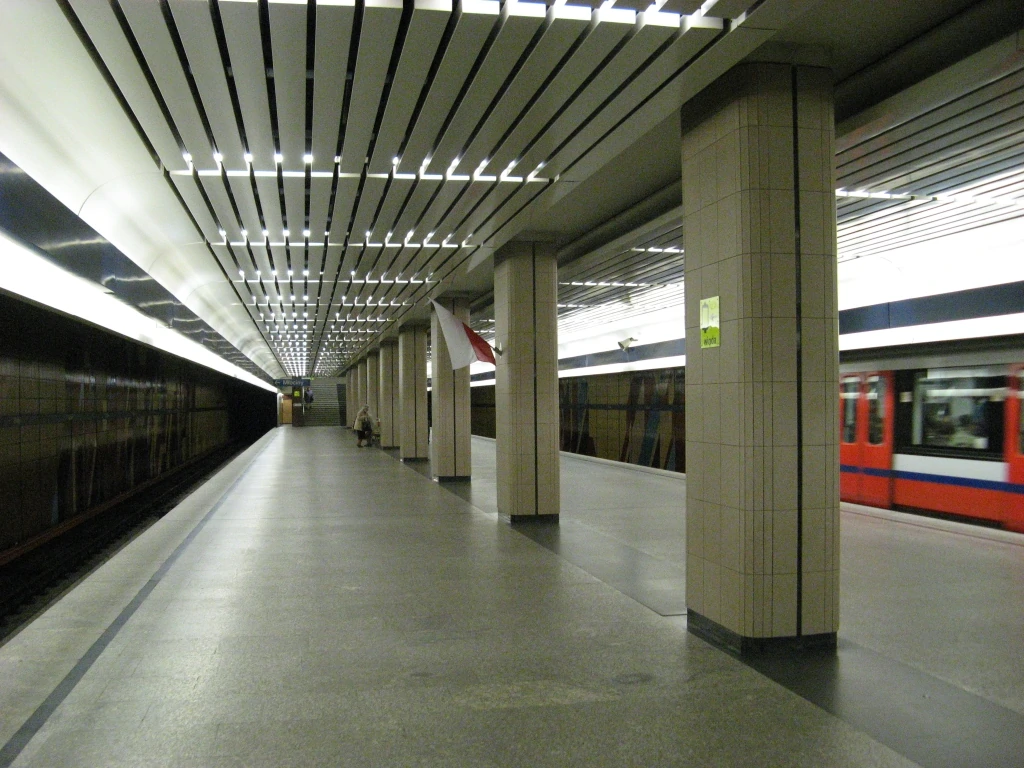
Służew Station, M1

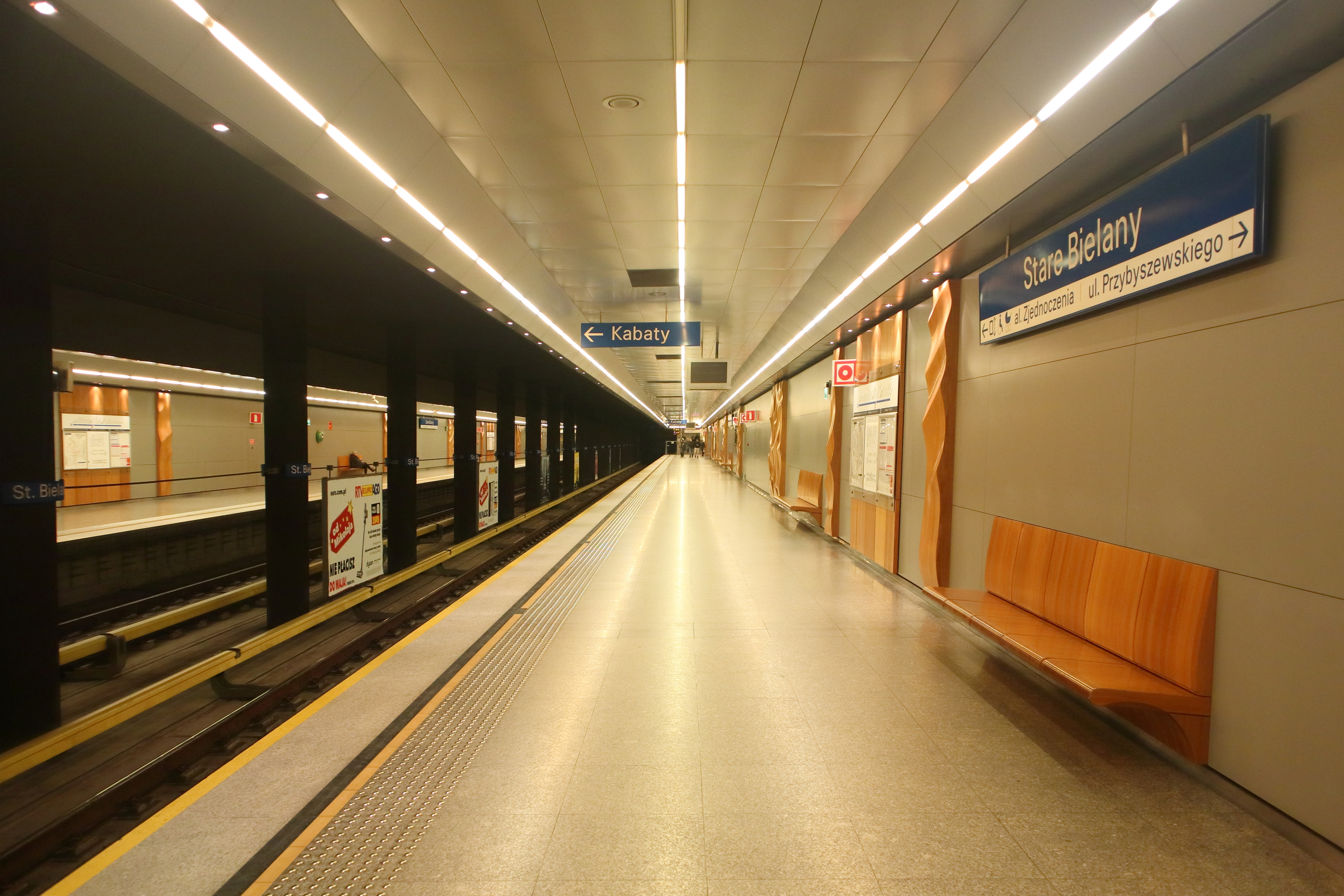
Stare Bielany Station, M1

=== Depots ===
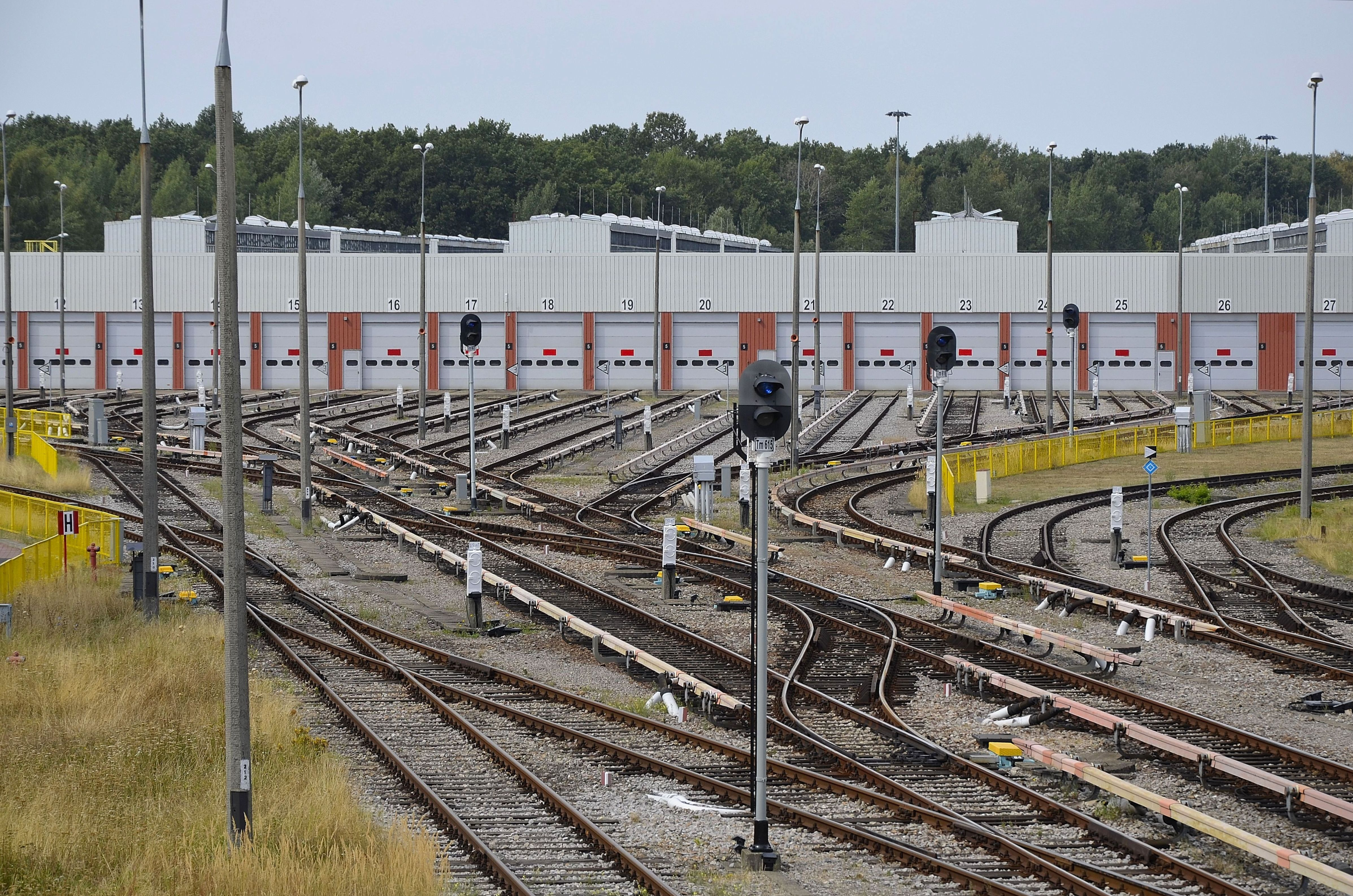
Kabaty depot

The Warsaw Metro currently only uses Kabaty depot, located south of Kabaty station. It is connected to a single-track line, the Warszawa Okęcie–Jeziorna railway at Warszawa Okęcie railway station on the PKP rail network. This link is not electrified and is used only for an occasional rolling-stock transfer. A second depot in Karolin is currently under construction and is expected to open in 2026. A third depot (Kozia Górka) is planned to be built as part of the first section of the M3 line from Stadion Narodowy to Gocław.

== Retired stock ==
Line	Current stock	Image	Introduced	Retired	Sets	Length (m/ft)	Seats	Capacity
M1	Metrovagonmash (81-717.3/714.3)		1989-1990, 2006	2023	15	115.26/378.15	260	1200
M1	Vagonmash (81-572/573)		1994-1997	2023	15	115.26/378.15	260	1200
M1	Vagonmash (81-572.2/573.2)		2009	2023	7	115.26/378.15	260	1200

Despite being retired in Poland, the 81-series trains are still widespread in several V4 countries and are well-known in Europe. Compared to west European metro systems (such as the Berlin U-Bahn or Paris Metro), these trains can maintain higher average speeds (80 km/h maximum and 35-40 km/h average). They were produced in several thousands, so their spare parts are still in high demand abroad. Some of these trains were donated to Ukraine. Unlike, for example, Hungary, Ukraine decided not to buy the Russian spare parts, as Polish ones already met this demand.

== Plans ==
A map of the Warsaw Metro, showing the north-south Line M1, as well as the planned east-west lines

Two new stations are planned from the beginning as completion of the line M1

The M1 line does not pass directly under Warsaw's Old Town, the city's main tourist attraction, which has few public transport links, passing it about 600 metres (2,000 feet) to the west instead. It also does not directly connect to the Warszawa Central railway station, with the nearest stop being over 400 metres (1,300 feet) to the east. Until the opening of M2 in March 2015, the metro system was confined to the western bank of the Vistula, thus doing nothing to ease traffic problems on Warsaw's bridges: a major bottleneck between the city center and the eastern Praga district. Plans for a third line to Warsaw Chopin Airport have been abandoned for the foreseeable future, with the airport served by a newly built railway station instead.

Transport planners have suggested that the WKD, a light rail line that runs to the western suburbs, could be integrated with the city's tram system, or be more closely tied to the metro and a future suburban rail network, or both. The first such plans were prepared in the late 1930s and the railway tunnel running below the city center was to be shared by both the railways and the metro. The WKD, PKP and Warsaw Metro systems are integrated and Warsaw city travel cards are also valid in the suburban trains operated by SKM and KM.

=== Future extensions ===
Warsaw Metro 2050 master plan

- Plac Konstytucji and Muranów, two stations omitted from the original plan to reduce cost that were to be built by 2009;
- extension of the M2 line, with the Lazurowa, Chrzanów, and Karolin metro stations, as well as the new Karolin Depot. This section is set to be completed in 2027;
- the M3 line set to begin construction in 2028. The first section from Stadion Narodowy to Gocław is planned to be completed by 2032.

== Reception ==
In 2009, the Warsaw Metro won two "Metro Award" prizes in the categories of "Special Merit Award for Commitment to the Environment" and "Best Maintenance Programme". These were followed by the Most Improved Metro award in 2011. The system consistently receives very high ratings among its passengers; a survey conducted in September 2014 indicated that 98% of the respondents rated it as good or very good.

== See also ==
- Transport in Poland
- Public Transport Authority (Warsaw)
- List of metro systems
- Transport in Warsaw
