= Ksawery Jasieński =

- Born: September 13, 1931 (age 94)
- Occupations: radio speaker, voice actor, voice-over lector
- Employer(s): Polish Radio, Polish Television

Ksawery Jan Jasieński (born 13 September 1931) is a Polish radio speaker, voice actor, voice-over lector and one of the most distinctive voices in the history of dubbing in Poland. Apart from countless radio and television programmes featuring his voice, he is also known as the person whose voice is used to announce station names in the Warsaw Metro underground system.

== Biography ==
Born in Radom, after World War II he graduated from a local lyceum and moved to Warsaw. His radio career started by accident in 1953, when he started reading books to fellow patients in a hospital where he had been recovering from a spine injury. The patients appreciated his voice and nominated him to a nationwide contest for a new speaker of the Polish Radio, which he won. Soon afterwards he also started working for the Polish Television as a voice-over reader.

He has been awarded the Silver Cross of Merit, Officer's Cross and Commander's Cross (2007) of the Order of Polonia Restituta.
