= Rondo Daszyńskiego metro station =

Warsaw metro station

Rondo Daszyńskiego
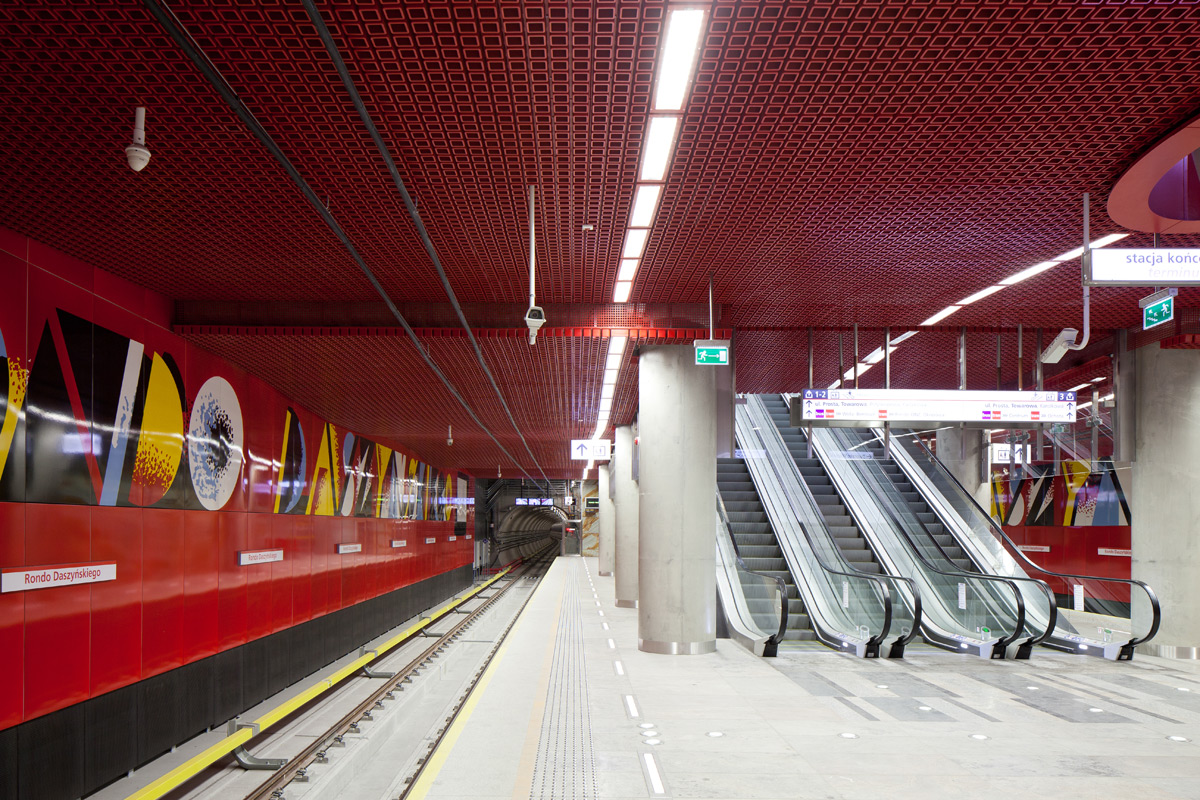

General information
- Coordinates: 52°13′48.5″N 20°59′00″E
- Owner: ZTM Warszawa
- Platforms: 1 island platform
- Tracks: 2
- Connections: 105, 178, 255; N45, N91, N95; 1, 10, 11, 22, 24, T

Construction
- Platform levels: 1
- Accessible: Yes
- Architect: Andrzej M. Chołdzyński

Other information
- Station code: C-9
- Fare zone: 1

History
- Opened: 8 March 2015; 11 years ago

Services
Preceding station	Warsaw Metro	Following station
Płocka towards Bemowo	M2 line	Rondo ONZ towards Bródno
Location
- Location within Warsaw

Rondo Daszyńskiego is a station on the central part of Line M2 of the Warsaw Metro.

The station fully opened for passenger use on 8 March 2015 as the western terminus of the inaugural stretch of Line M2 between Rondo Daszyńskiego and Dworzec Wileński. It was designed by Polish architect Andrzej M. Chołdzyński and constructed by Metroprojekt. Murals were created by Wojciech Fangor, artist of the Polish School of Posters.

The station is located just west of Rondo Daszyńskiego (Daszyński Roundabout), named in honor of Ignacy Daszyński.

Construction of the station was made difficult by adverse hydrological conditions.

== Gallery ==
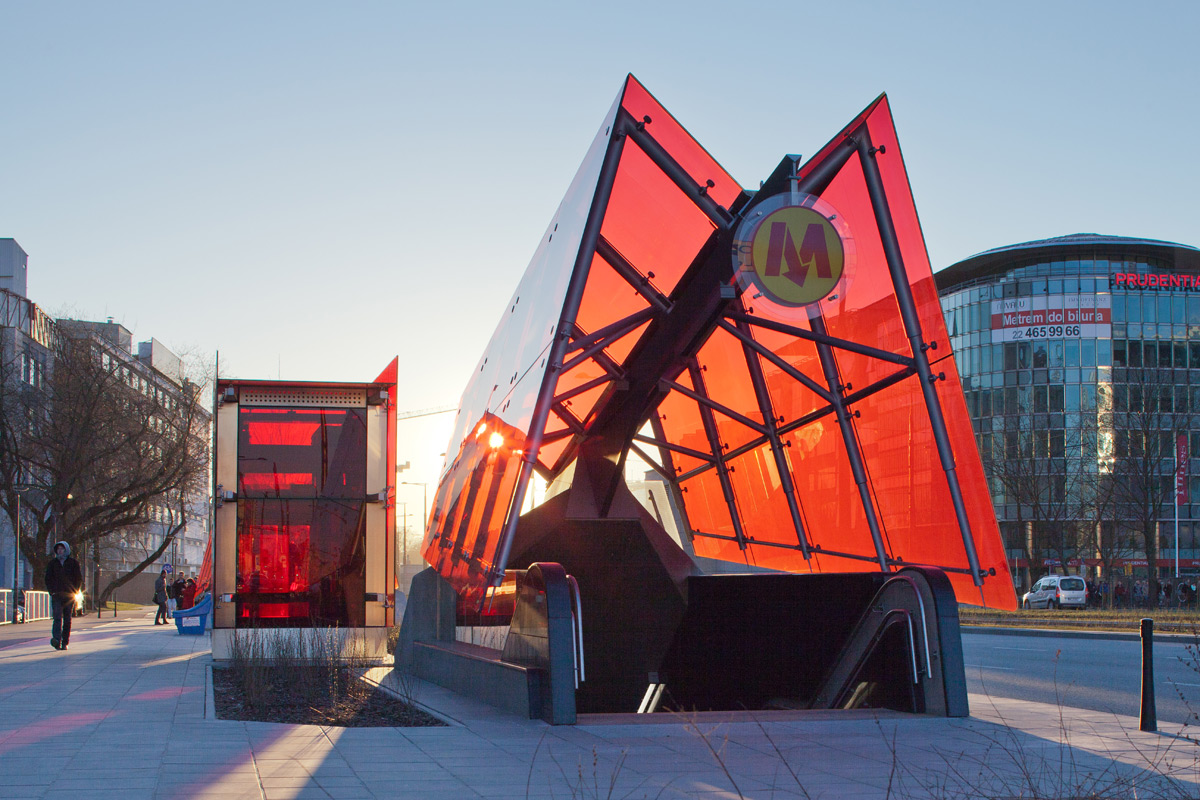
Entrance to the station

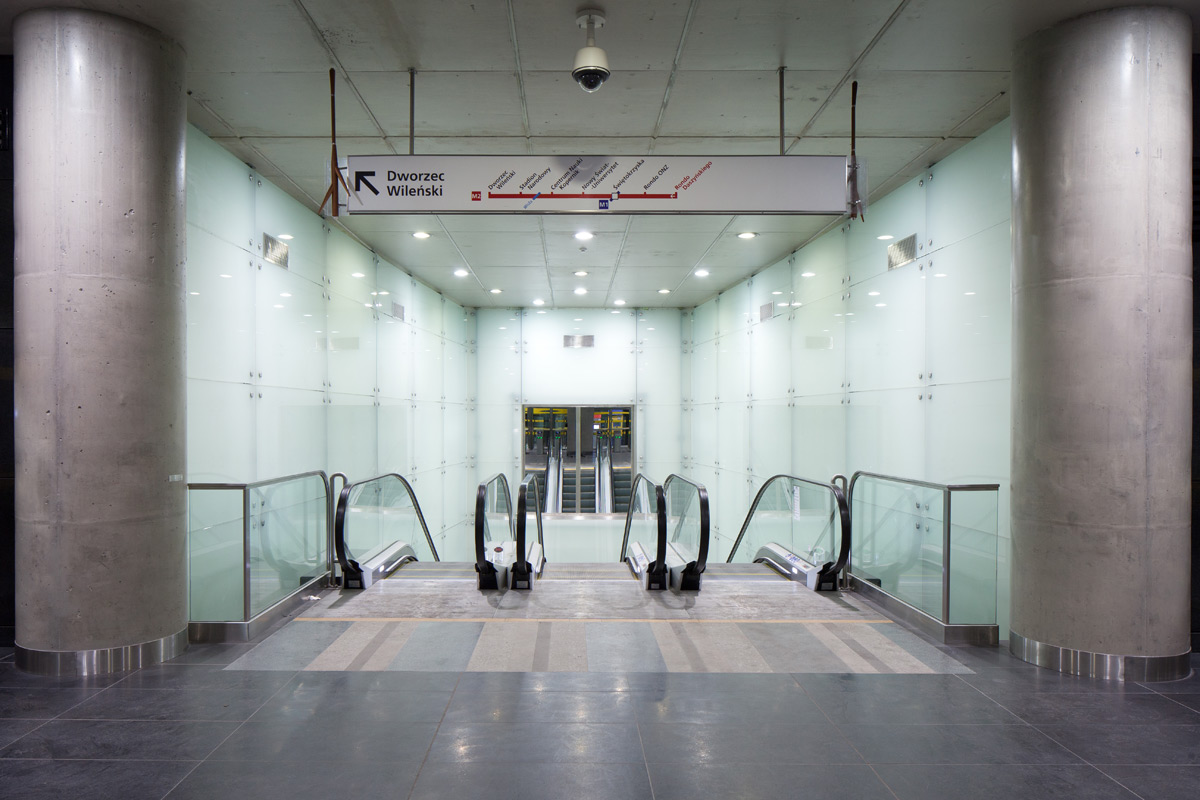
Entrance to the station

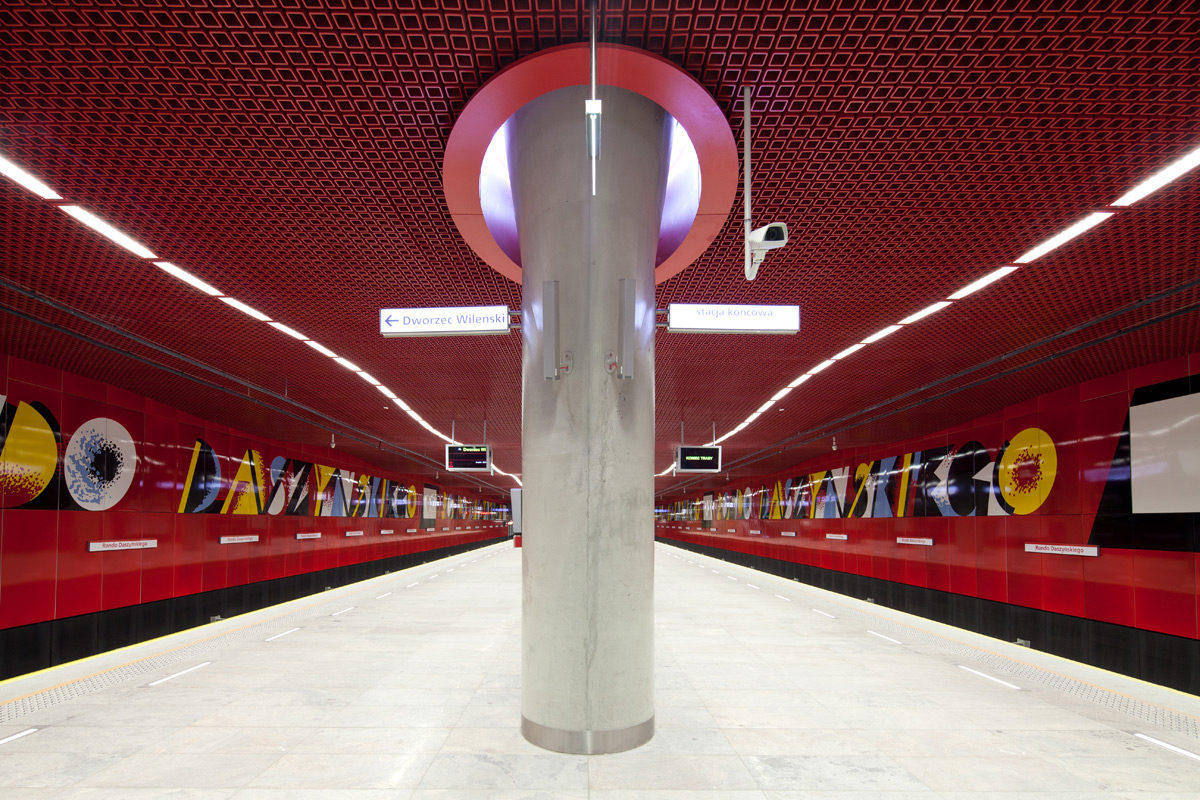
Main platform

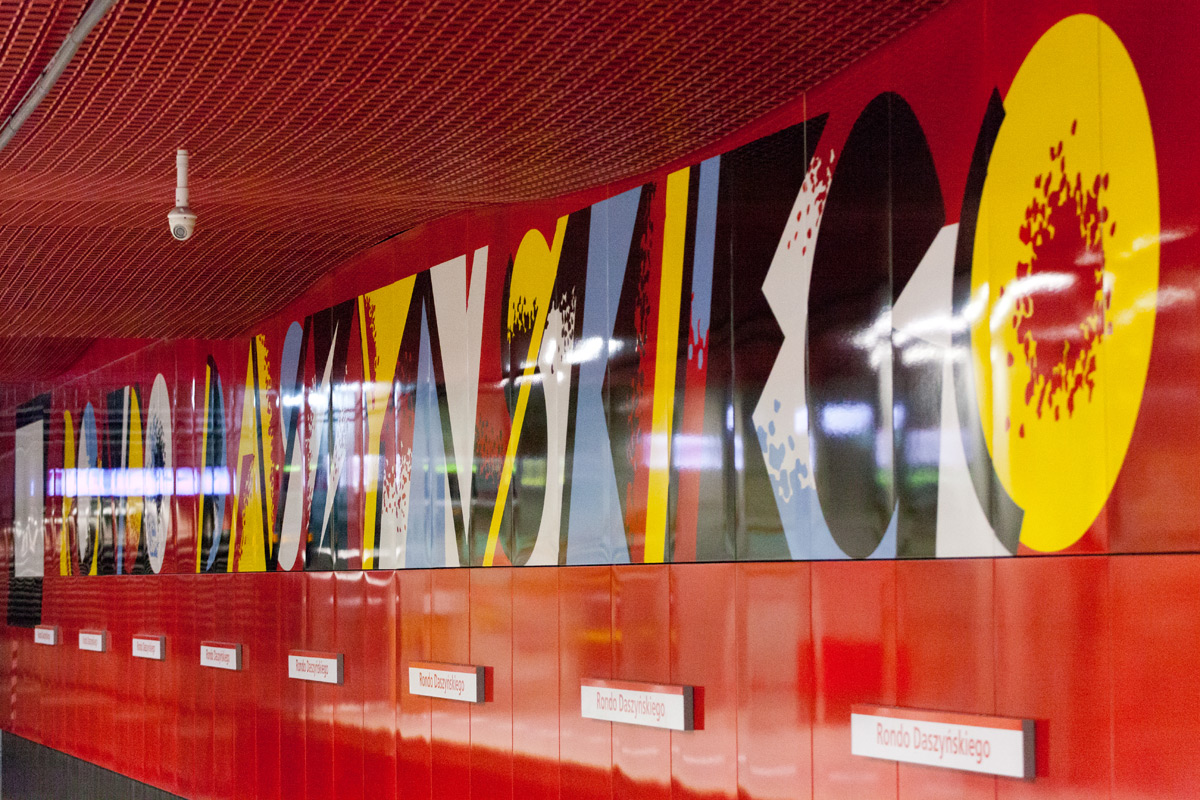
Interior detail, murals designed by Wojciech Fangor
