= Metroprojekt =

Polish project management office

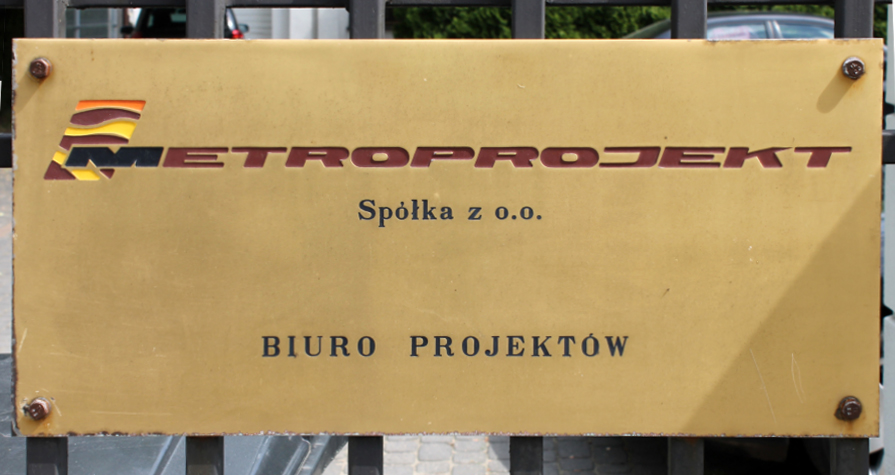
- Type: Private
- Founded: 1 January 1951
- Headquarters: 19b Solińska Street; Warsaw, Poland
- Website: www.metroprojekt.pl

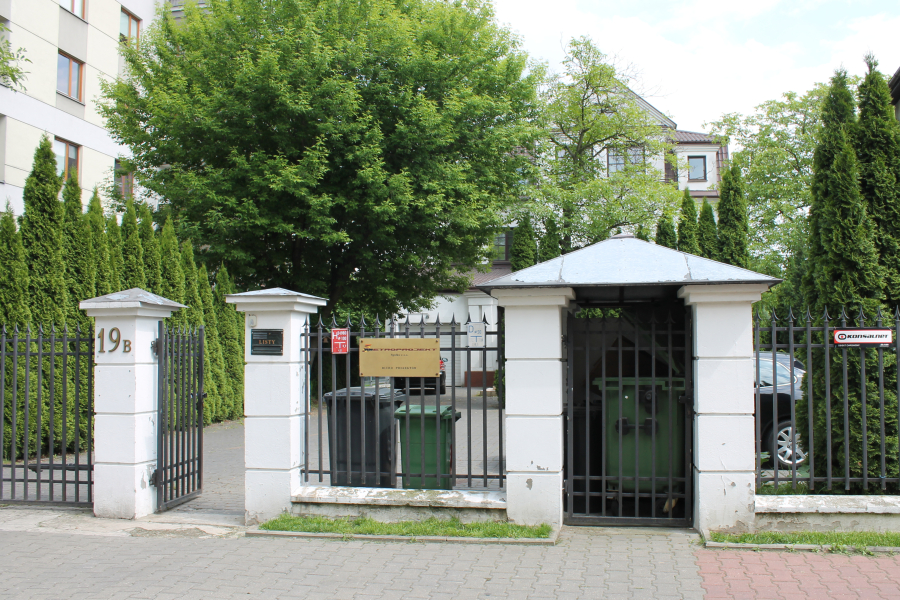
Company's headquarters

Metroprojekt is a project management office established in late 1950 in Warsaw with the intention of designing the city's metro system. From 1951, it operated as a state-owned enterprise. In 1953, after the reduction of work on the construction of the deep metro, the office reduced its workforce and shifted its focus to municipal and social construction. Over the following years, various concepts for the construction of a shallow metro were developed, and ultimately, in 1982, after the decision to begin the investment, the company returned to its original tasks. In 1991, the office was transformed into a private limited company. Today, it is involved in designing, among other things, the metro system and transportation and municipal construction.

== History ==
=== Origins (1945–1950) ===
After the end of World War II, as part of the reconstruction of the destroyed Warsaw, the construction of the metro was planned. The first plan from 1945 referred to it as the rapid urban railway. In one of the pavilions of the former hospital in Ujazdów, the communication workshop of the Reconstruction Bureau of the Capital was established, and on 11 February 1948, it was transformed into the Project Management Office for the Rapid Urban Railway. Initially, it was subordinated to the Commissioner for the Reconstruction of the Capital City of Warsaw, and from January 1949, it became part of the Warsaw branch of the Central Design Bureau of Architecture and Construction. The office later moved its headquarters to the Royal Arsenal building on Długa Street.

The task of the Project Management Office for the Rapid Urban Railway was to create the preliminary design for the first line of the rapid urban railway. The concept, referencing the then-current spatial development plans for the Warsaw Urban Complex, proposed a main north-south line from Młociny to Służewiec, and, in the future, an east-west line from Grochów to Wola. The first line was to have 24 stations and a length of 21.6 km, with part of it running in open trenches and 7.7 km in tunnels with a rail head depth of 7 to 11 meters. This design was completed in 1949, and the following year, a group of specialists from the Soviet Union visited Warsaw at the government's invitation. They analyzed the proposed plans and presented their findings to the government, which decided to begin the investment.

On 14 December 1950, by government resolution, the Metro Construction Authority was established as the investor's body, Metrobudowa as the executive body, and Metroprojekt as the project management office, which was transformed from the Project Management Office for the Rapid Urban Railway.

=== State-owned enterprise period (1951–1991) ===
Metroprojekt started its activity on 1 January 1951. The company was located in the rear wing of the State Council building on Ujazdów Avenue (currently the building of the Chancellery of the Prime Minister).

The office's first task was to develop the design for the deep metro for Warsaw. At the end of 1951, the Metro Construction Authority was dissolved, and in its place, the Industrial Construction Union Metrobudowa was created. Metroprojekt was incorporated into it as a separate unit, with the director of Metroprojekt being the deputy director of Metrobudowa. With the progress of construction and design work, Metroprojekt increased its workforce to 700 people, and in the spring of 1953, the office moved with Metrobudowa to the building at 77/79 Marszałkowska Street. On 29 October 1953, the government suspended the construction of the underground railway for two years, and the office reorganized itself to focus on designing municipal and social construction. The workforce was reduced three times, but the staff specializing in metro projects remained.

In the autumn of 1954, Metroprojekt was tasked with analyzing the possibility of constructing the metro line at a shallower depth than the previous deep metro design. The preliminary work from 1956 proposed flattening the line along the entire route and extending it from Młociny to Służewiec. On 20 September 1957, by government resolution, the unit was subordinated to the Ministry of Construction and Building Materials Industry and renamed the Engineering and Transport Project Management Office Metroprojekt. In 1958, the office completed the preliminary design for the shallow metro based on the approved assumptions and considering the updated urban planning guidelines. From 1960 to 1963, additional studies and general assumptions for the first shallow metro line were developed, which were approved by the Presidium of the National Council of the City of Warsaw in October 1964. In May 1965, the office was renamed the Warsaw Industrial and Special Construction Project Management Office Metroprojekt. Between 1966 and 1970, designs were created for tunnel safety structures under the Warsaw Cross-City Line. In January 1969, after being subordinated to the Warsaw authorities, the office was named the Municipal and Special Construction Project Management Office Metroprojekt.

Until 1971, the office updated its assumptions, and in that year, the issue of the Warsaw metro was revisited. On 26 April 1972, by decision of the Presidium of the National Council of the City of Warsaw, the office was tasked with preparing comprehensive technical and economic assumptions for the first line. This decision was made due to the residential developments in the southern part of the city that could not function properly without the underground railway. The office quickly developed several concepts for the route of the first line, worked on them until 1974, and then produced detailed technical-economic assumptions in 1975. These were evaluated by a team of specialists appointed by the mayor, as well as by the Planning Commission of the Council of Ministers and a group of Soviet specialists visiting Poland. Despite this, the decision to build the metro was not made at that time.

In 1982, the government adopted a resolution to build the metro line, and design work was resumed. To meet the needs of the investment, which was initially planned to be completed in 1994, Metroprojekt increased its workforce. On 14 May 1982, following the resolution of the Presidium of the Council of Ministers, the office returned to its core tasks. In 1986, work also began on the design for the second line, as well as for the metro in Łódź and the transport system in Kraków.

In 1982, Metroprojekt employed 213 people, including 10 seniors who had been working in the company since its inception. In 1986, the office had 414 employees, and in 1989, 420.

=== Private limited company period (since 1991) ===
On 1 July 1991, the state office was transformed into a private limited company, Metroprojekt, which continues the activities of the former state enterprise.

The limitation of financial resources in the later stages of the construction of the first line of the Warsaw metro slowed down the implementation and design of the underground railway. The office's workforce was reduced to 120 people in 1994, and later to 65 in 1998 and 1999. According to Metroprojekt's designs, 16 out of 21 stations and 19 out of 21 tunnels for this line were completed.

On 1 July 2008, the office moved its headquarters to its own buildings at 19b Solińska Street. In September 2008, Metroprojekt, together with Andrzej M. Chołdzyński, developed the conceptual design for the central section of the second line of the Warsaw metro.

The company participates in tenders, develops, and implements projects in various areas of construction. It is a member of the Chamber of Building Design.

== Offer ==
The company offers comprehensive design services in the areas of:

- metro and rapid transit,
- road, railway, special, and industrial tunnels,
- roads, streets, tram lines,
- traffic systems,
- engineering structures in the field of municipal construction,
- various types of underground networks.

In addition to providing design services, the office performs:

- substitute investment management,
- expert opinions and technical assessments,
- technical consultancy services,
- printing services.

== Directors and presidents ==
From	To	Name	Sources
1951	1951	Mieczysław Krajewski	
1951	1954	Michał Ochnio	
1954	1957	Mieczysław Krajewski	
1957	1973	Tadeusz Schuch	
1973	1982	Ryszard Walczak	
1982	2000	Józef Dudkiewicz	
2000		Mieczysław Szczepański	

Between 1945 and 1948, Mieczysław Krajewski headed the communication office of the Bureau of Reconstruction of the Capital, and then from 1948 to 1950, he led the Bureau of Rapid Urban Railway Projects. He became the first director of Metroprojekt but wished to hold a more technical role after taking up the position. At the end of 1951, he became the chief engineer, and Michał Ochnio took over as director for three years. In 1954, Mieczysław Krajewski again became the head of the office. However, when work on the metro was halted, he lost interest in the company's new activities and remained director until 1957, when he moved to the newly established Bureau of Studies and Projects of Urban Transport. His place was taken by Tadeusz Schuch, the former chief engineer. In 1973, Ryszard Walczak, previously deputy director of the Capital Design Bureau of Municipal Construction, became director of Metroprojekt. In 1982, he resigned for health reasons, and Józef Dudkiewicz was appointed director through a competition. Since 2000, the company has been led by Mieczysław Szczepański.

The president of the company also serves as its general director.

== Awards and distinctions ==
- 1969 – second-degree award from the Committee of Construction, Urban Planning, and Architecture for the design and implementation of the heat tunnel under the Vistula river.
- 1972 – Sześcian Roku Award for achievements in the design of structural solutions for the multi-level intersection of Wawelska Street and Niepodległości Avenue.
- 1973 – Sześcian Roku Award for the development of temporary technical guidelines for metro design.
- 1974 – Sześcian Roku Award for achievements in designing underground structures around the Warszawa Centralna railway station.
- 1974 – first-degree award from the Minister of Administration, Territorial Development, and Environmental Protection for the designs of engineering structures on the Łazienki Route.
- 1975 – award from the Ministry of Higher Education and Technology for methods of protecting structures near deep excavations.
- 1976 – first-degree award from the Minister of Administration, Territorial Development, and Environmental Protection for the design of the transport system, road structures, and underground passage complex at the Warszawa Centralna railway station.
- 1976 – Sześcian Roku Award for achievements in designing the western section of the Łazienki Route.
- 1977 – two Sześcian Roku awards for achievements in the technical design of the Children's Memorial Health Institute and in designing the Praga transit collector.
- 1977 – second-degree award from the Minister of Administration, Territorial Development, and Environmental Protection for the design of prefabricated reinforced concrete elements for underground passages.
- 1978 – first-degree award from the Minister of Administration, Territorial Development, and Environmental Protection for the design of the Praga collector.
- 1979 – award from the Committee of Construction, Urban Planning, and Architecture for the best project of the year for the Children's Memorial Health Institute.
- 1979 – Sześcian Roku Award for achievements in designing the rehabilitation center of the Children's Memorial Health Institute.
- 1980 – special award from the Committee of State Awards for participation in the realization of the Children's Memorial Health Institute.
- 1980 – third-degree award from the Minister of Administration, Territorial Development, and Environmental Protection for the study of traffic flow improvements in Kielce.
- 1981 – Sześcian Roku Award for achievements in developing documentation for shaping and securing the Vistula escarpment in the Gnojna Góra area.
- 1983 – second-degree award from the Minister of Administration, Territorial Development, and Environmental Protection for technical guidelines for designing rapid tram communication.
- 1995 – special award from the Minister of Construction and Spatial Development for the completed Warsaw Metro project.
- 2001 – badge for Four Centuries of Warsaw’s Capitality.
- 2005 – first prize in the second review of the Chamber of Building Design for the Metro Station Design of Plac Wilsona metro station.
- 2006 – Deserving of Warsaw distinction.
