= Gocław, Warsaw =

Part of district Praga-Południe in Warsaw

Gocław
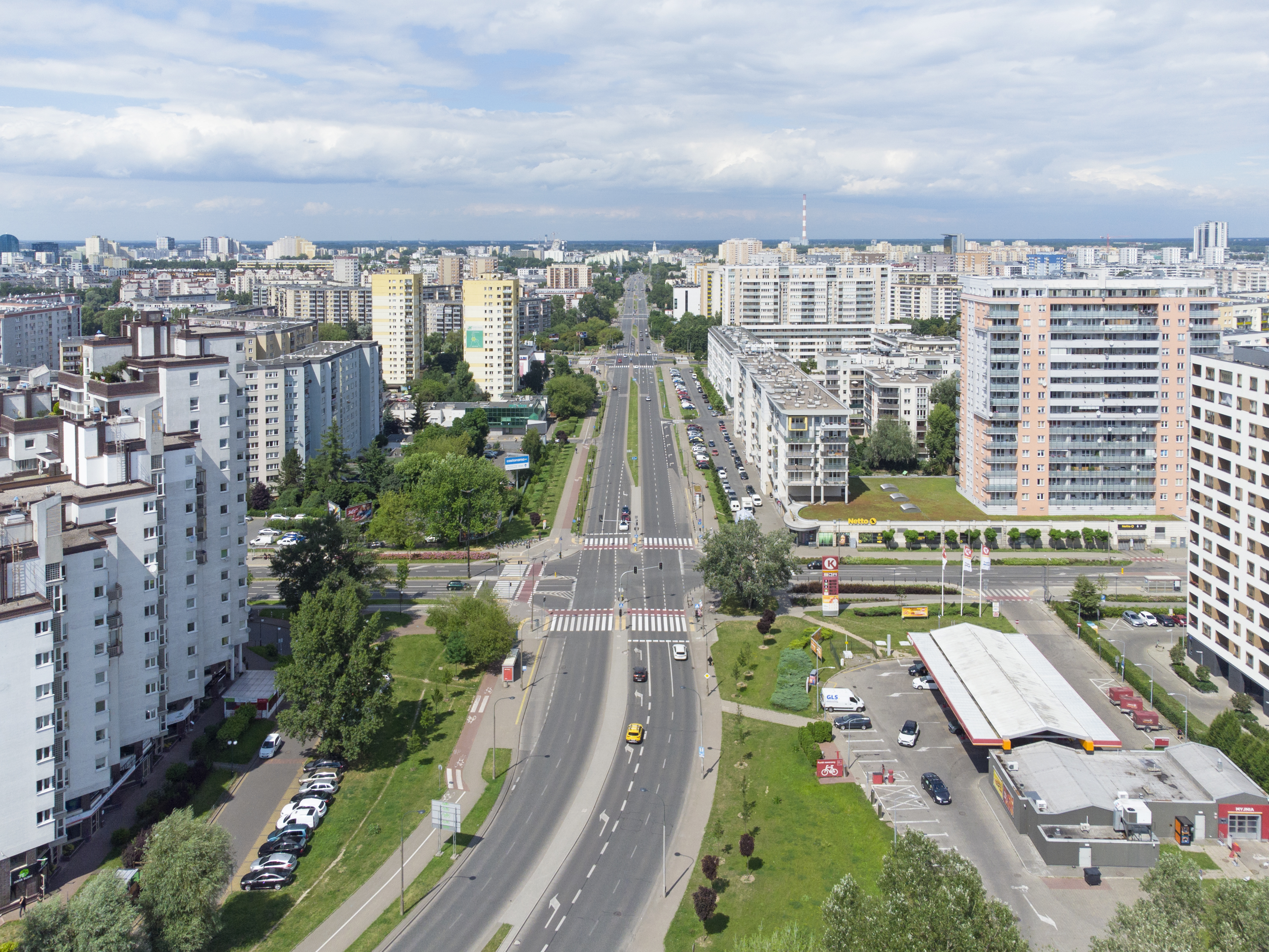
- Aerial view of Gocław

- Location within Warsaw Location within Poland
- Coordinates: 52.2417°N 21.0836°E
- Country: Poland
- Voivodeship: Masovian
- City: Warsaw
- District: Praga-Południe
- Time zone: UTC+1 (CET)
  - Summer (DST): UTC+2 (CEST)

Gocław is a subdistrict in Praga-Południe, in south-east Warsaw with a population of over 50,000 inhabitants.

== Neighbourhoods ==
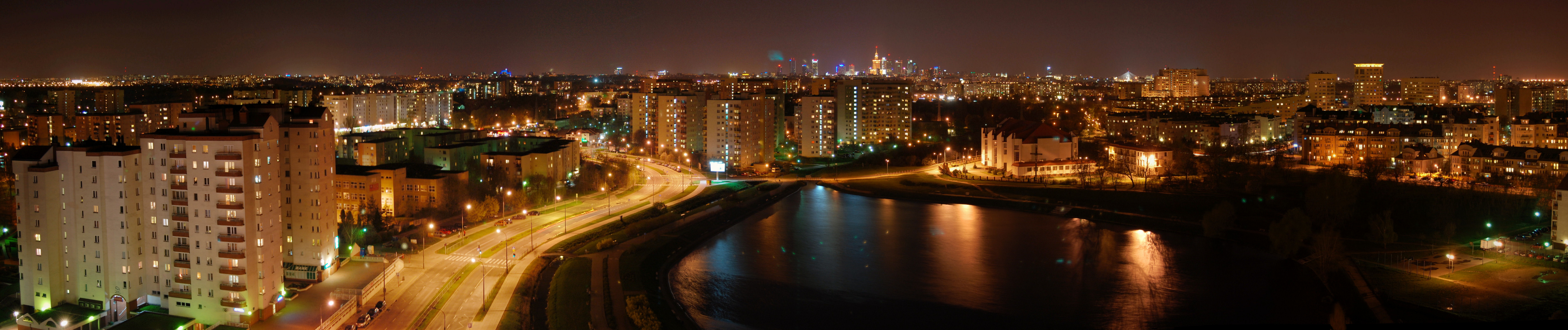
Gocław at night

The area of Gocław is divided into six separate neighborhoods (osiedla):

- Iskra
- Jantar
- Orlik
- Wilga
- Kępa Gocławska
- Przyczółek Grochowski
