= Kubusia Puchatka Street, Warsaw =

Street in Warsaw, Poland

Coordinates: 52.236030°N 21.016810°E

Kubusia Puchatka Street (Polish: ulica Kubusia Puchatka) is a street in Warsaw, Poland named after Winnie-the-Pooh, known in Polish translations as Kubuś Puchatek. It was built in the first half of the 1950s, where the ruins of annexes’ buildings used to stand.

The street is 149 metres (489 ft) long, and in some parts it is 23 metres (75 ft) wide. It is intended to be a walking path to provide relief from crowds of the Nowy Świat Street.

The whole street is built up with four-storey buildings with shops on the ground floor.

Two rows of lime trees transported from Szczecin were planted along the street in 1954. The street building's project is a work of architect Zygmunt Stepiṅski and architecture students from Warsaw University of Technology.

The name of the street was chosen in the competition by readers of Express Wieczorny in 1954.

On the north end of the street, next to its intersection with Świętokrzyska Street, is the Warsaw Metro station M2 Nowy Świat-Uniwersytet.

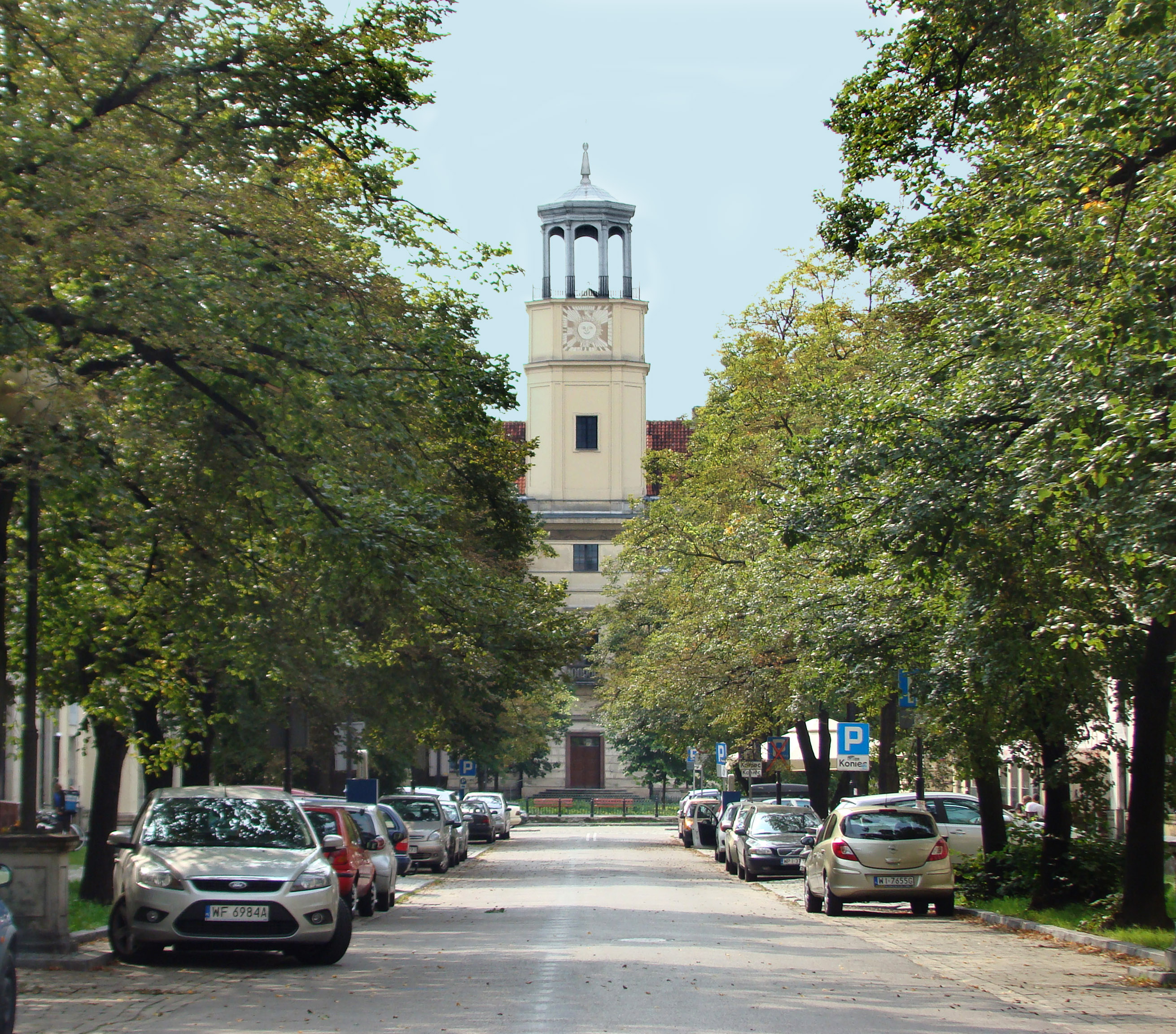

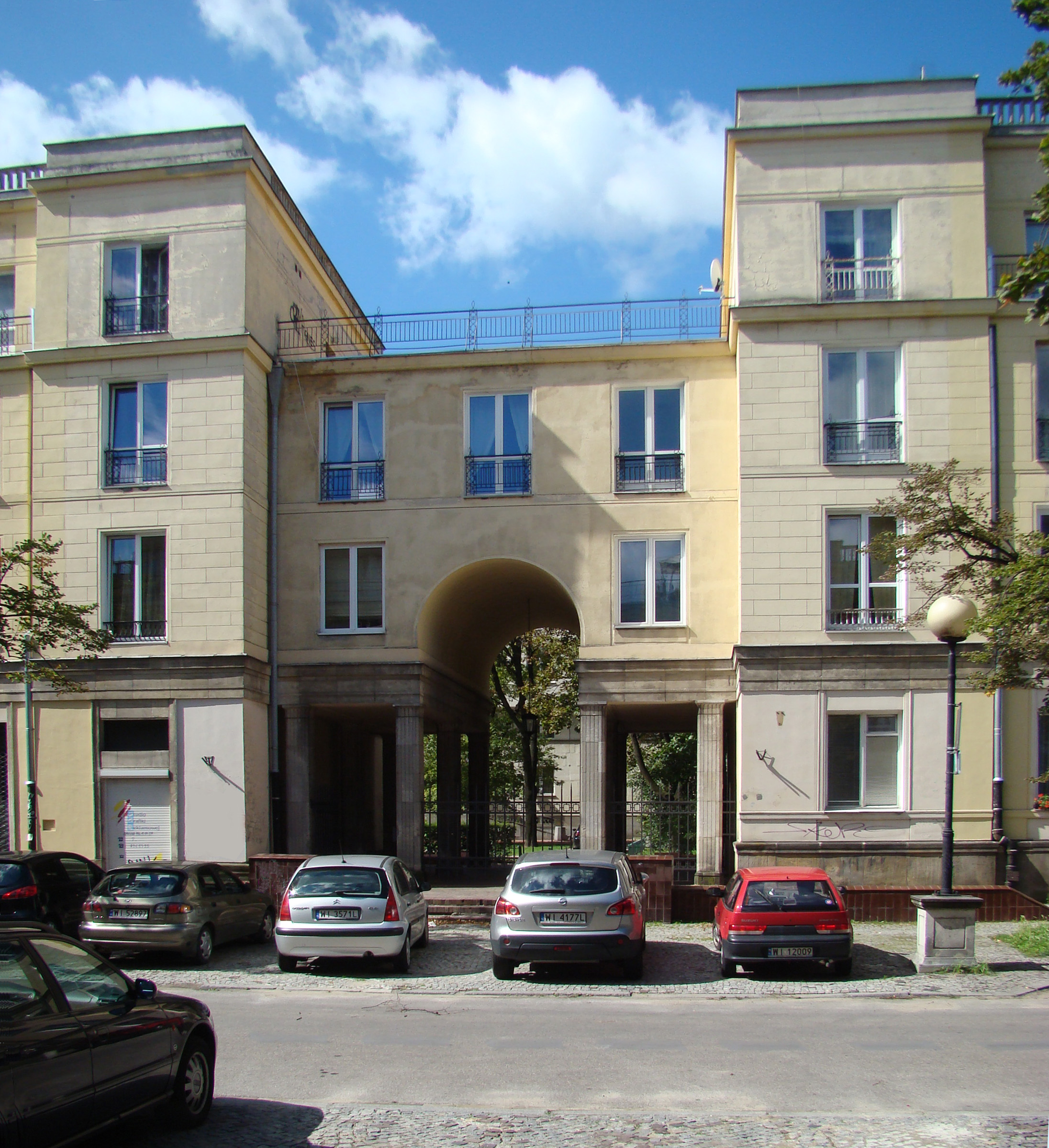

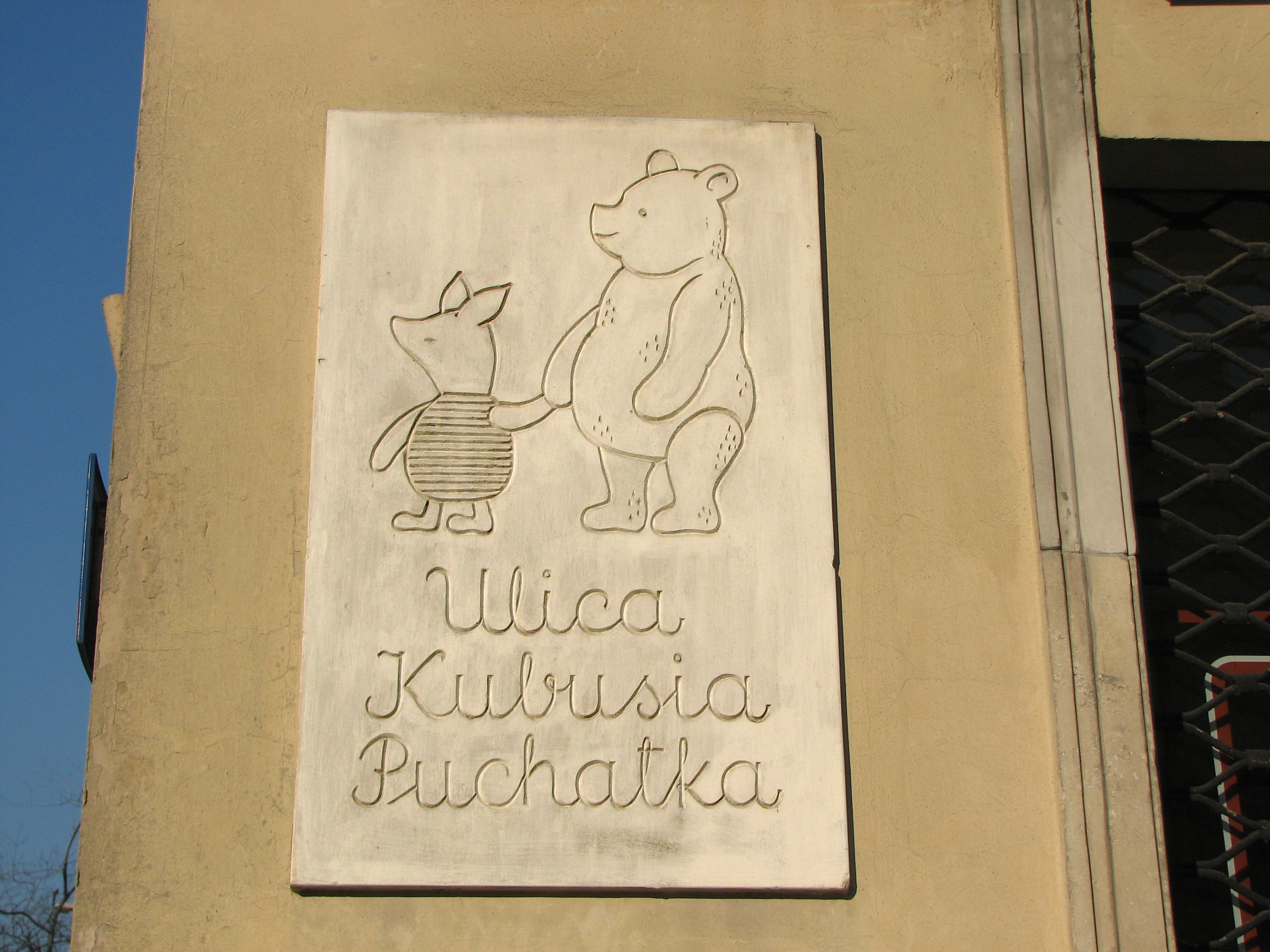

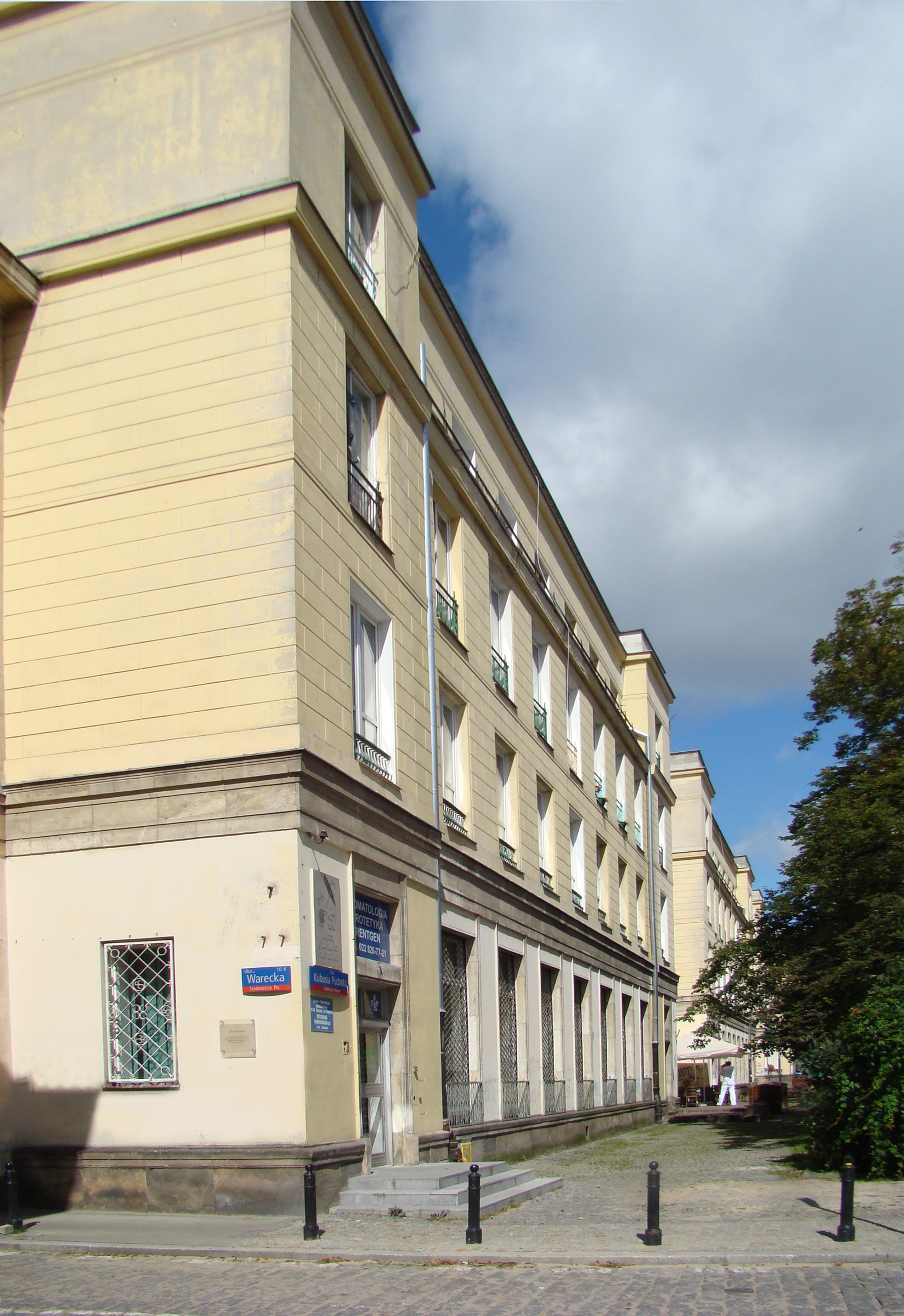
