= Piłsudski Square =

Square in Warsaw, Poland

Coordinates: 52°14′28.41″N 21°0′45.94″E

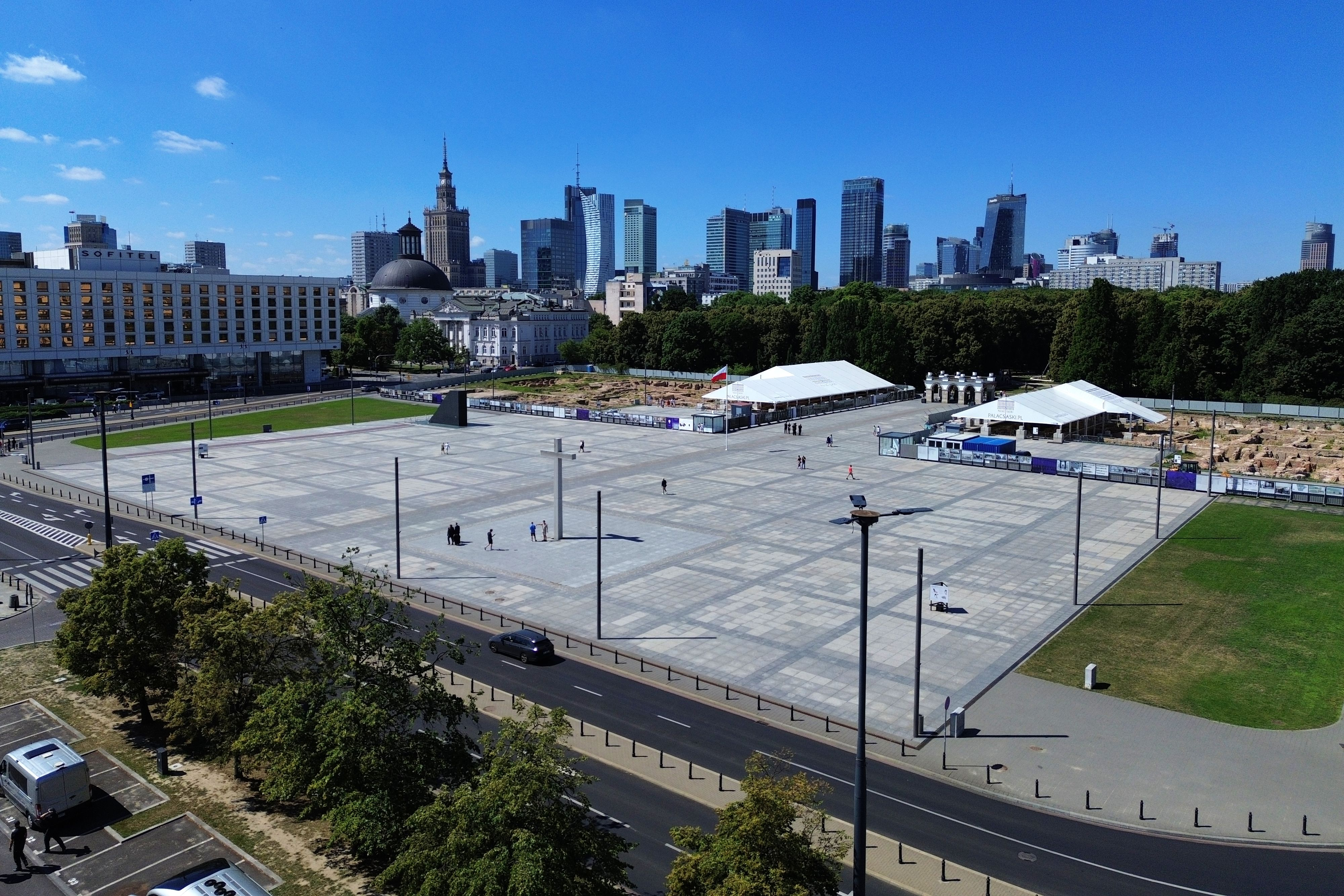
Warsaw skyline from Piłsudski Square. Left to right: Sofitel Warsaw Victoria Hotel, Holy Trinity Church, Palace of Culture and Science, Flagpole in the centre of the square, Tomb of the Unknown Soldier.

Piłsudski Square (Note: previously Victory Square (plac Zwycięstwa, 1946–1990) and Saxon Square (plac Saski, 1814–1928)) (Polish: plac marsz. Józefa Piłsudskiego), is the largest city square of Poland's capital, located in the Warsaw city centre. The square is named after Marshal Józef Piłsudski who was instrumental in the restoration of Polish statehood after World War I.

== Current and previous names ==
Over the centuries, the square has been named successively as Saxon Square (Plac Saski) after Poland's Saxon kings, with the Saxon Palace standing adjacent to the square, but destroyed in World War II; then Piłsudski Square (after Józef Piłsudski) during the Second Polish Republic; then briefly, Adolf-Hitler-Platz during Germany's World War II occupation of Warsaw; and, after 1946, Victory Square (Polish: plac Zwycięstwa) in honour of Poland's and her allies' victory in World War II. After 1989 and regime change in Poland, it is again called Piłsudski Square.

Piłsudski Square is the site of the Tomb of the Unknown Soldier, erected on top of the underground foundations of the Saxon Palace, destroyed by the Nazis in World War II.

== History ==
Up until the 17th century, the area of the present-day square consisted of the lands of the Warsaw starosty (administrative district), bisected by an old route running north to south along the line of the current Wierzbowa and Mazowiecka streets, and from 1621, also by the Zygmuntowski rampart. This route connected with the Czersk road (Krakowskie Przedmieście). At the crossroads that developed here, Tobiasz Morsztyn built a manor, which was later replaced by Jan Andrzej Morsztyn with a new building designed by Tylman van Gameren.

The square originated as the courtyard of the Saxon Palace, which was rebuilt between 1712 and 1727 by Augustus II the Strong from the Morsztyn Palace. It was regulated between 1736 and 1745 and surrounded by residential buildings. It was separated from Krakowskie Przedmieście by buildings that housed, among other things, stables and coach houses. From 1754 to 1759, Henryk Brühl rebuilt the Ossoliński Palace, adjacent to the Saxon Palace, into a new, representative late-Baroque building, thenceforth known as the Brühl Palace.

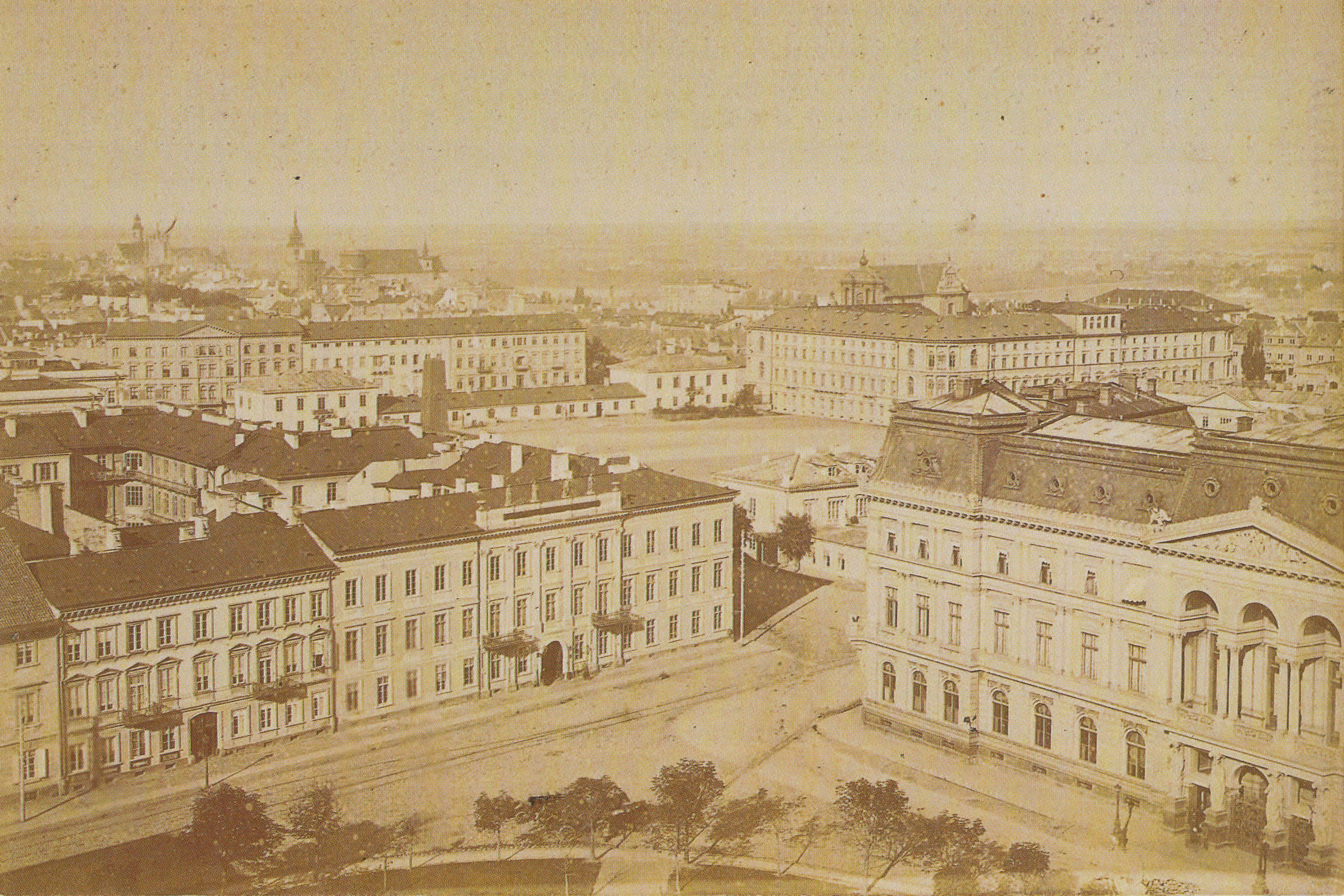
Saxon Square – seen from the dome of the Holy Trinity Church (1870)

During the Warsaw Insurrection in 1794, fighting with Russian troops took place in the square, and in 1807, Napoleon Bonaparte reviewed French troops there. Between 1815 and 1816, by order of Grand Duke Constantine, the square was paved to allow for military drill and parade exercises. The Saxon Palace was rebuilt between 1839 and 1842; its central body was replaced by a Neoclassical colonnade, through which the square gained a connection to the Saxon Garden.

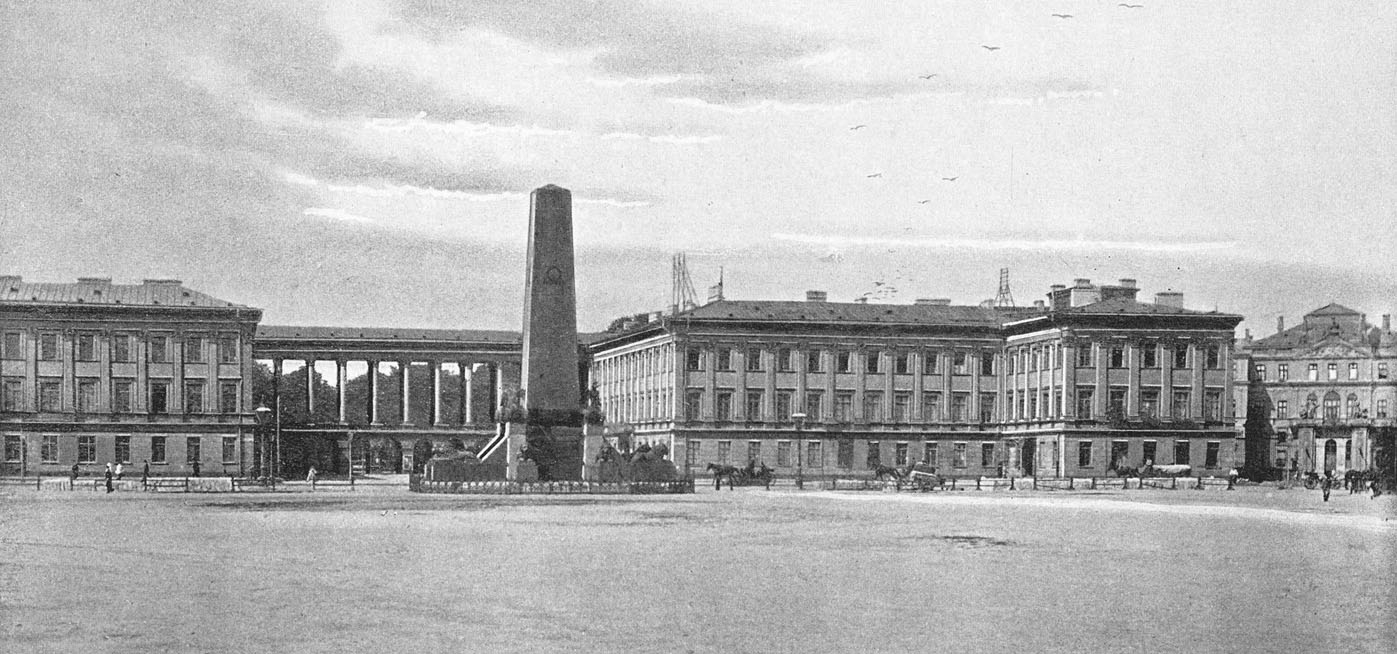
Monument of Polish loyalists on Saxon Square in Warsaw, 1841-1894

From 1841 to 1894, the square featured the Monument to Poles who fell for their fidelity to their monarch, designed by Antonio Corazzi, commemorating seven Polish officers who died at the hands of insurgents during the November Night Uprising. In 1894, the monument was moved to Zielony Square (now J. H. Dąbrowski Square), as a monumental Cathedral of St. Alexander Nevsky with a 70-meter bell tower was planned for the center of the square. The temple, designed by the St. Petersburg architect Leon Benois, was dismantled between 1921 (the bell tower) and 1924–1926 (the main edifice).

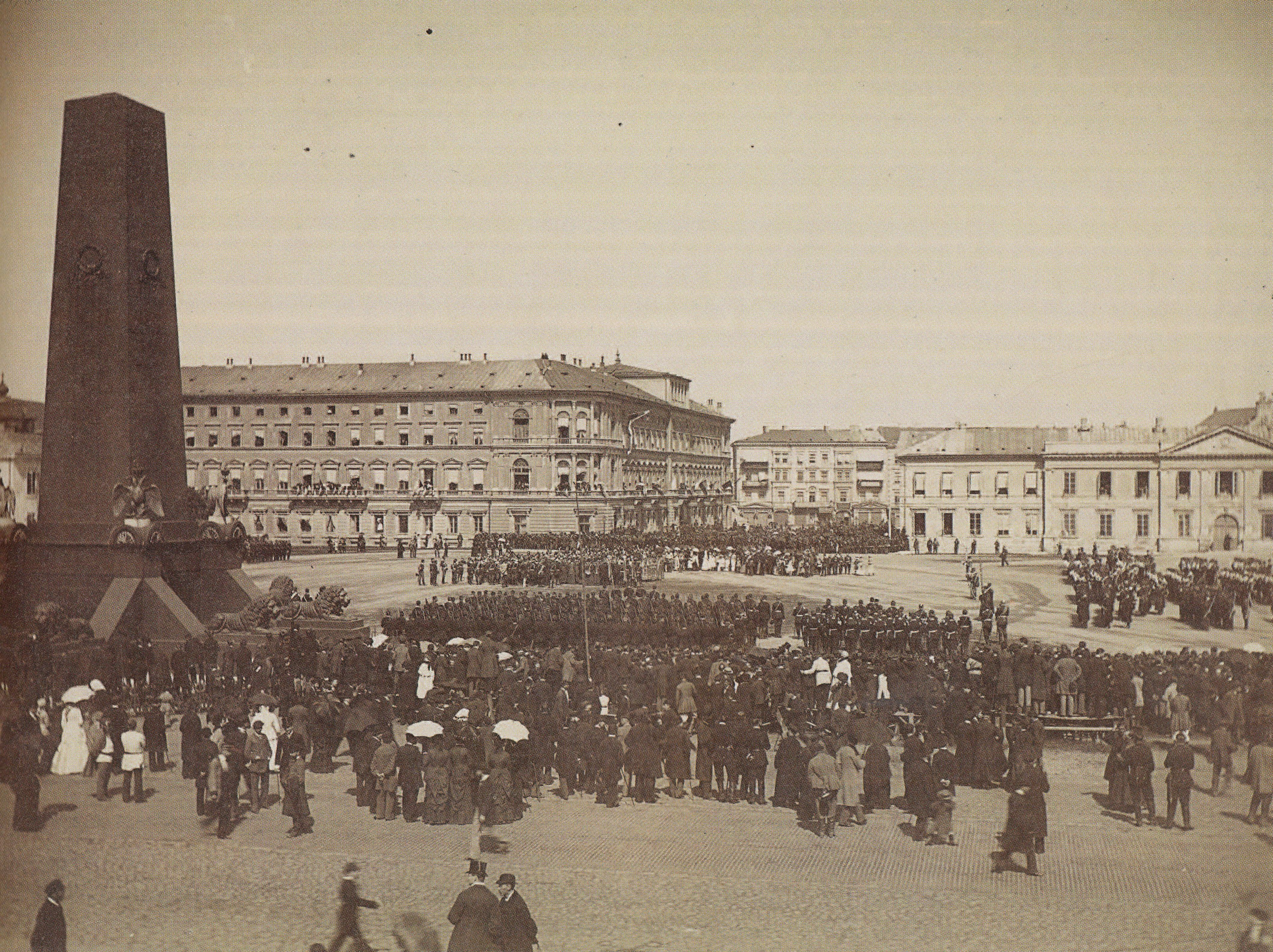
The ceremony at Saxon Square on the occasion of the coronation of Tsar Alexander III in the Kremlin in May 1883. On the left is the monument to loyalist officers, later moved to Green Square

Between 1855 and 1877, the Hotel Europejski was erected in stages between the present-day Karaszewicza-Tokarzewskiego and Ossolińskich streets, and the Kronenberg Palace was built at the corner of the square and Mazowiecka Street between 1868 and 1871. After 1890, the building of the Russian district headquarters, later the seat of the military courts, was erected in the eastern part of the square.

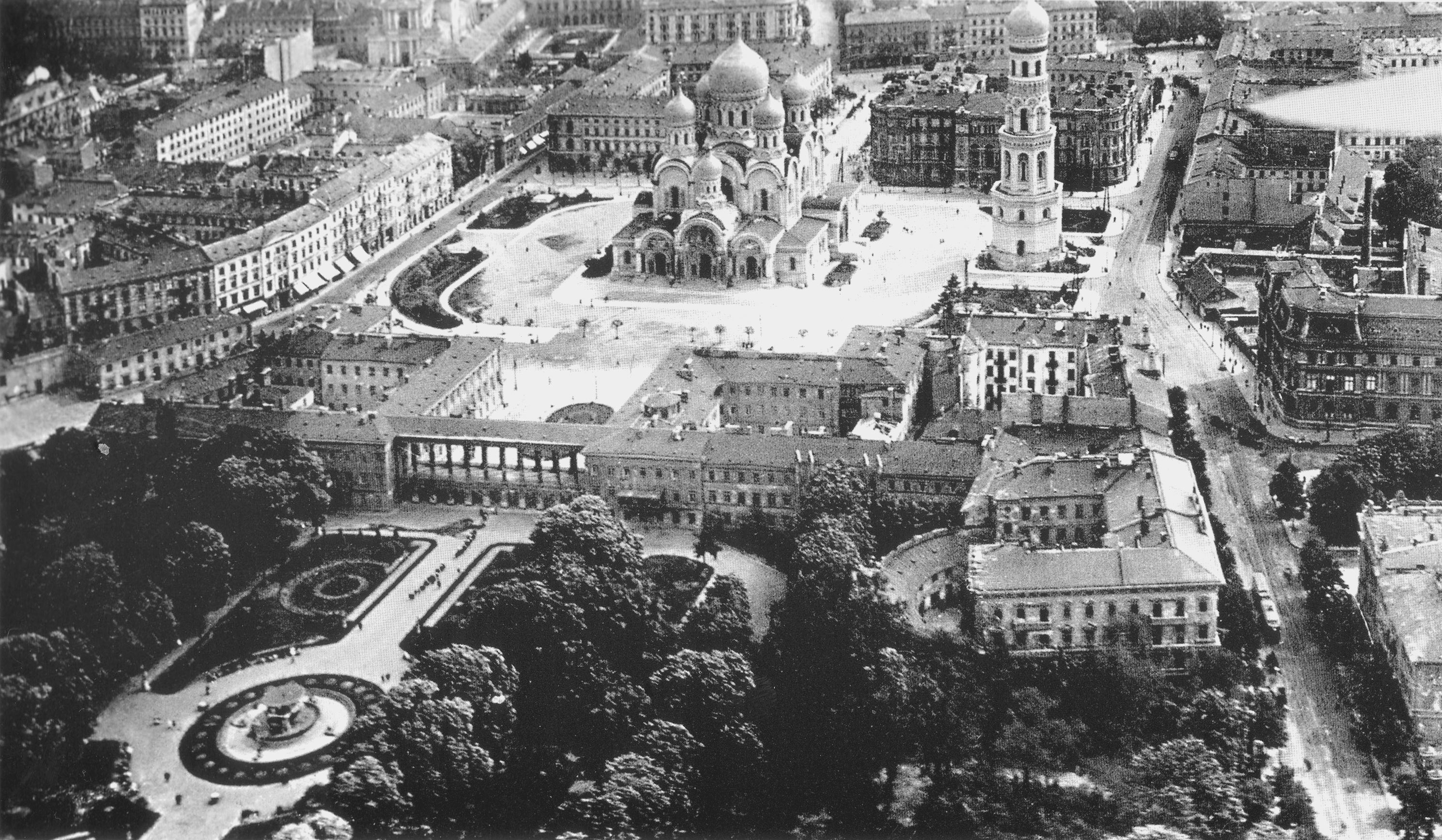
Saxon Square seen from air (1919) with the Alexander Nevsky Cathedral in view

In 1923, the Monument to Prince Józef Poniatowski was placed in front of the Saxon Palace. In 1925, the Tomb of the Unknown Soldier, commemorating heroes who fell for the freedom of Poland, was erected in the three central arcades of the Saxon Palace.

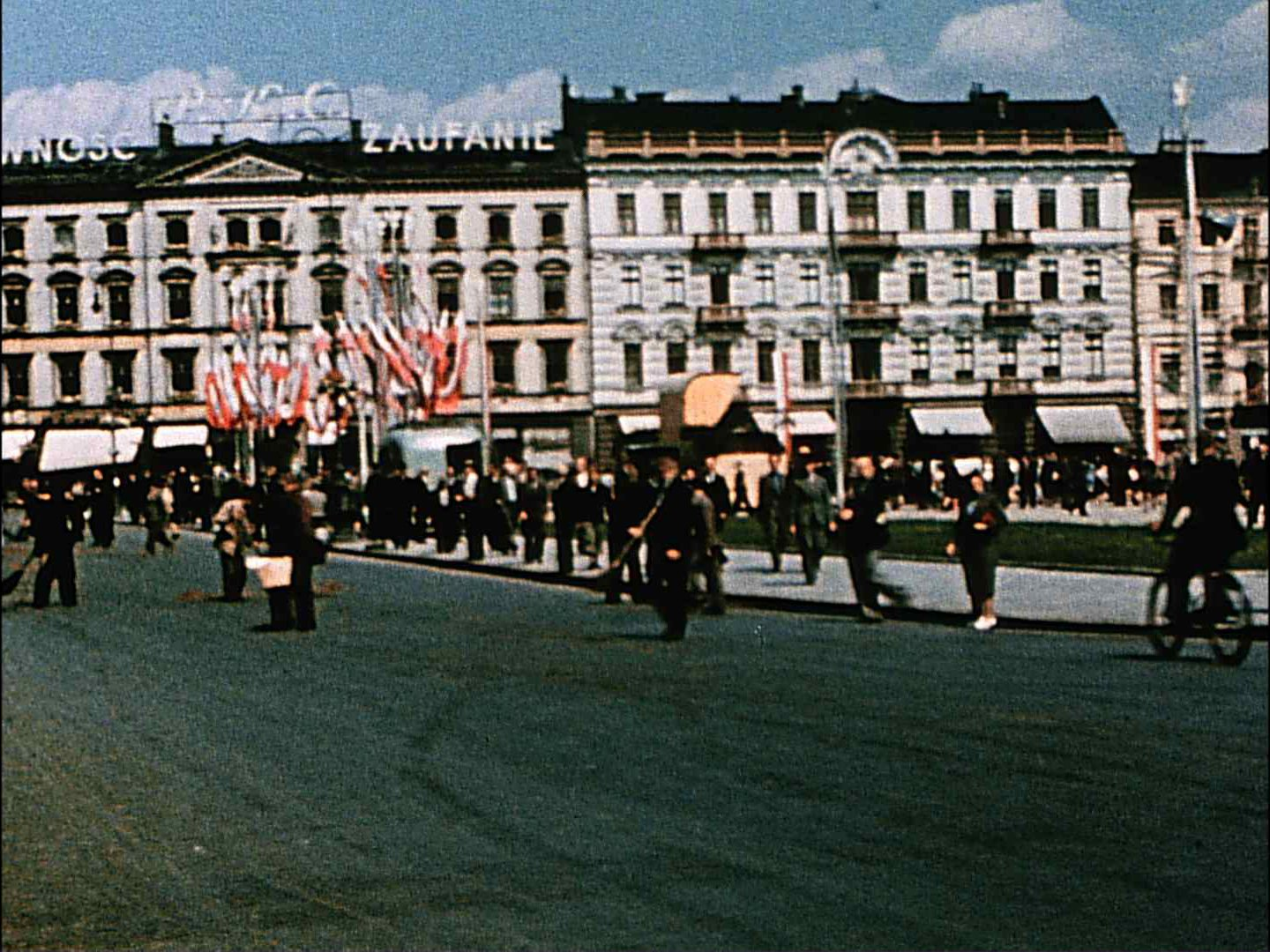
Piłsudski Square, 1939.

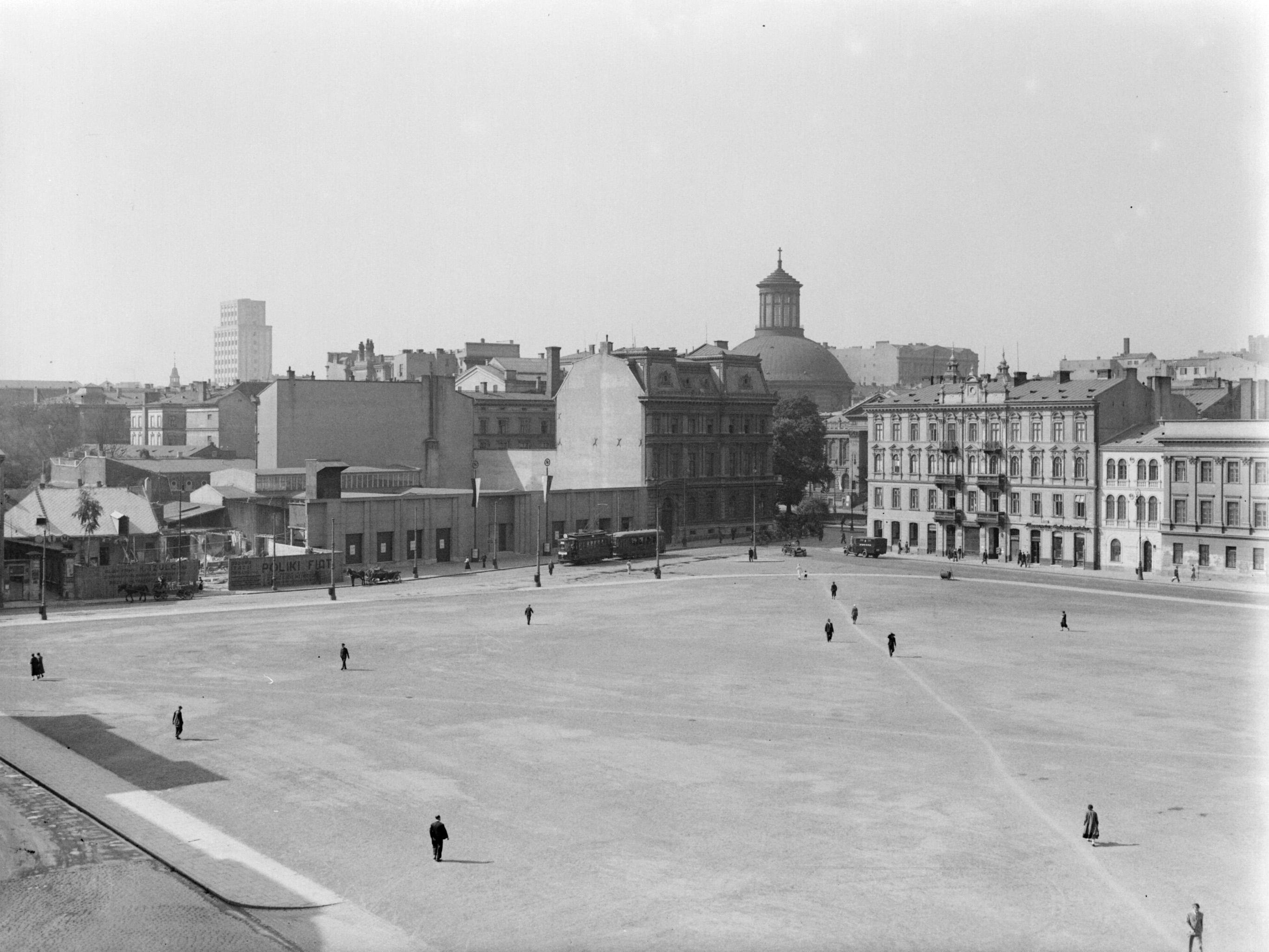
The southwestern corner of the square in 1934, visible among others: the tenement house at 6 Królewska Street, the Kronenberg Palace and the pavilion of the Institute of Art Propaganda

In 1931, the Institute of Art Propaganda building was erected at 13 Królewska Street.

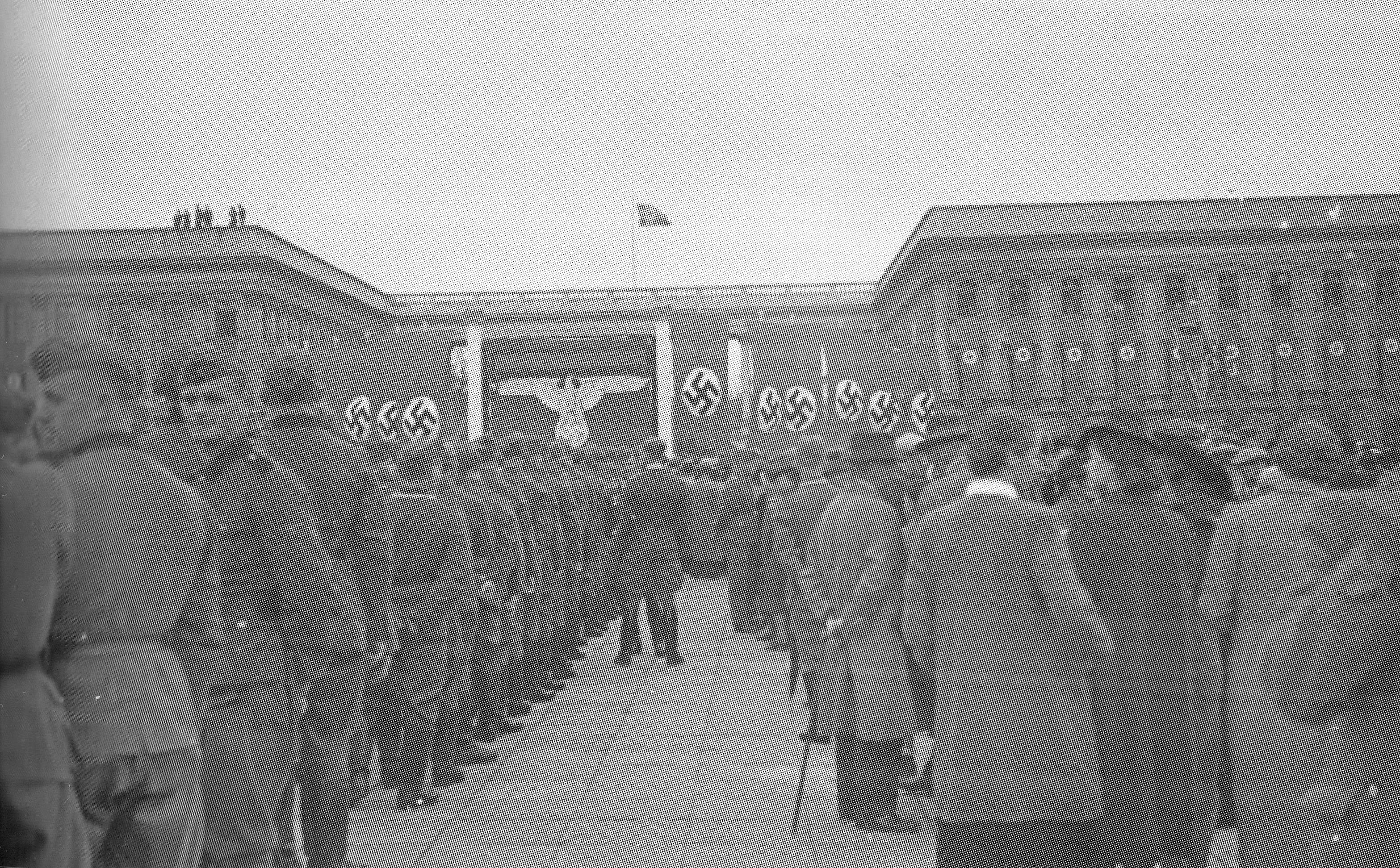
The Germans during the ceremony marking the first anniversary of the attack on Poland, which was combined with the renaming of the square to Adolf-Hitler-Platz (September 1, 1940)

During the German occupation, the square became the central point of the so-called "government district," with the Brühl Palace serving as the seat of the Warsaw District Governor, Ludwig Fischer. The Germans changed the name of the square twice: to Sachsenplatz in May 1940, and to Adolf-Hitler-Platz in September of the same year. This name was forbidden to be translated into Polish. At the same time, in early September 1940, Jews were forbidden from entering the square. On July 28, 1941, Czesław Zadrożny, nom de guerre "Głowacki," from the "Wawer" Small Sabotage Organization, burned a large plywood model of the letter "V," symbolizing the victory of the Wehrmacht, which had been set up by the Germans in the center of the square.

The Germans retreating from Warsaw blew up the Saxon and Brühl Palaces and destroyed the Poniatowski monument.

In 1946, the square was cleared of rubble, and the surviving fragment of the Tomb of the Unknown Soldier was secured. The reconstruction and expansion of the Grand Theatre building, completed in 1965, changed the shape of the square, which was lengthened towards Trębacka Street. Between 1974 and 1976, the Victoria Hotel was erected on the site of the demolished Kronenberg Palace.

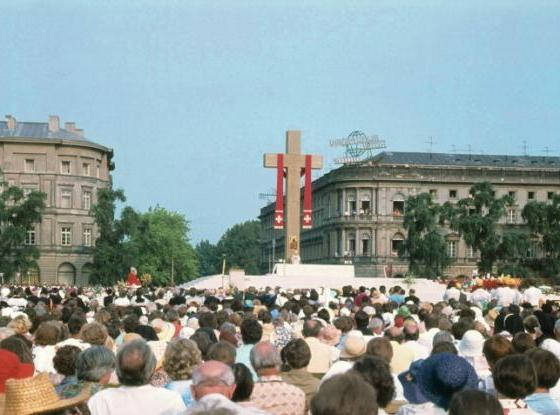
Piłsudski Square (then Victory Square) during Pope John Paul II visit to Warsaw; Holy Mass, 1979.

During his first pilgrimage to Poland, on June 2, 1979, Pope John Paul II celebrated a holy mass in the square. The altar with a large cross was placed in the eastern part of the square, at the mouth of the current General Michał Tokarzewski-Karaszewicz Street. Approximately half a million people attended the mass. The cross, where John Paul II celebrated the mass, was later placed in front of the St. Maximilian Kolbe Church in Służewiec. To commemorate the papal mass of 1979, during martial law, a cross of flowers was laid in the square, around which people gathered. It was a symbol of resistance against the authorities and support for Solidarity. The cross was constantly liquidated by the authorities.

In 1981, the funeral ceremonies for Primate Stefan Wyszyński took place in the square. In 1990, a plaque commemorating John Paul II's mass from 1979 and Stefan Wyszyński's funeral ceremonies from 1981 was embedded in the square's pavement. On June 13, 1999, during his seventh pilgrimage to Poland, John Paul II beatified 108 Polish martyrs who died during World War II in the square.

In 1995, the Monument to Józef Piłsudski, designed by Tadeusz Łodziana, was unveiled in the eastern part of the square.

On May 26, 2006, Pope Benedict XVI, during his pilgrimage to Poland, celebrated mass in Piłsudski Square. On June 6, 2009, on the 30th anniversary of John Paul II's 1979 mass, a cross designed by Marek Kuciński, Jerzy Mierzwiak, and Natalia Wilczak was unveiled in the square. In 2010, the beatification ceremony for Father Jerzy Popiełuszko took place in the square, presided over by the papal legate, Cardinal Angelo Amato. (Note: on behalf of the Pope, Cardinal Angelo Amato (Prefect of the Congregation for the Causes of Saints))

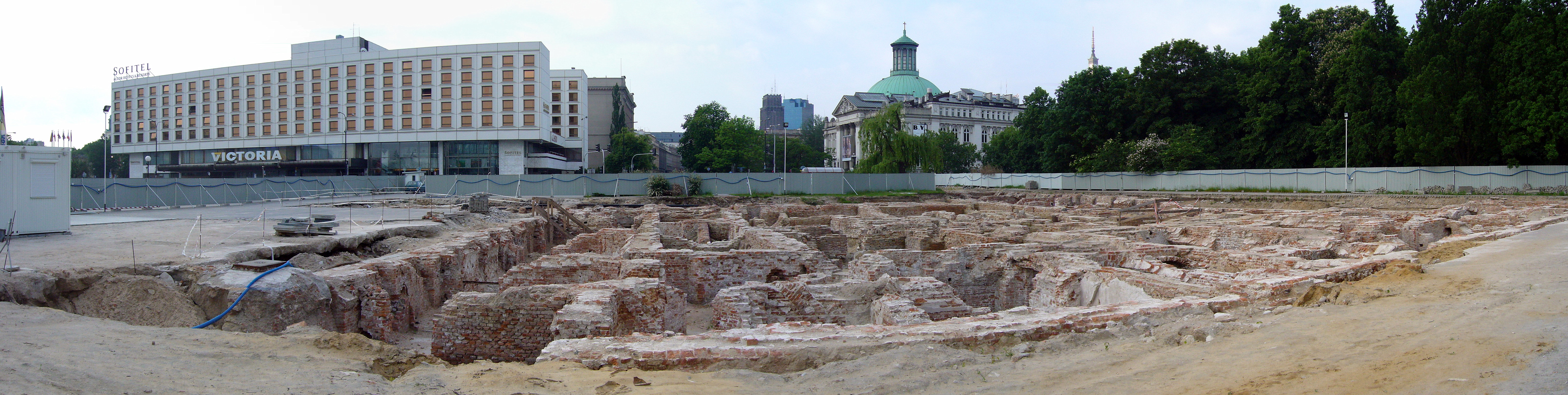
Discovered foundations of the Saxon Palace from the south (2007)

In 2006 and 2008, archaeological research was conducted in the square, in the area where the Saxon Palace was located, related to plans for the building's reconstruction. Traces of settlement from the 12th, 13th, 15th, and 16th centuries were found. The cellars of the Morsztyn Palace from the second half of the 17th century were also uncovered. During the works, approximately 45,000 movable objects, mainly from the 18th century, were inventoried. For many years, there has been a discussion about the reconstruction of the Saxon and Brühl Palaces and the tenement house at Królewska Street.

The square is the property of the State Treasury, but until 2017, it was administered by the capital's Municipal Road Authority (Zarząd Dróg Miejskich). In November 2017, the Minister of Infrastructure and Construction, despite the negative opinion of the City of Warsaw Office, transferred the square to the Masovian Voivodeship for permanent management, at the Voivodeship's request. The decision was justified by the fact that the square, as a place primarily serving the organization of state ceremonies, should be under the supervision of the government administration. In the same month, the Ministry of Interior and Administration issued a decision establishing the square as a so-called closed-off area under government control (teren zamknięty), as a result of which the city lost its planning and architectural rights to the square in favor of the Voivodeship. On April 10, 2018, the Monument to the Victims of the Smoleńsk Tragedy and a stone marking the location for the future Monument to Lech Kaczyński were unveiled in the square. In October 2018, the District Court for Warsaw-Śródmieście ordered the prosecutor's office to initiate an investigation into the establishment of Piłsudski Square as a closed area.

== Beatification process of Father Jerzy Popiełuszko ==
The beatification ceremony process of Father Jerzy began in Warsaw's Piłsudski Square as it had amassed over 100,000 and was celebrated by 120 bishops and 1,600 priests, including cardinals William Levada, Stanislaw Dziwisz, and Adam Maida.

== Location ==
The square is located in front of the 15–hectare Saxon Gardens extending south-west, close to the Zachęta and the Holy Trinity Church. The nearest metro station is Nowy Świat-Uniwersytet, a seven-minute walk away.

== See also ==
- Saxon Palace in prewar Warsaw
- Józef Piłsudski Monument, Warsaw
