= Bohdan Pniewski =

Modernist Polish architect and educator (1897-1965)

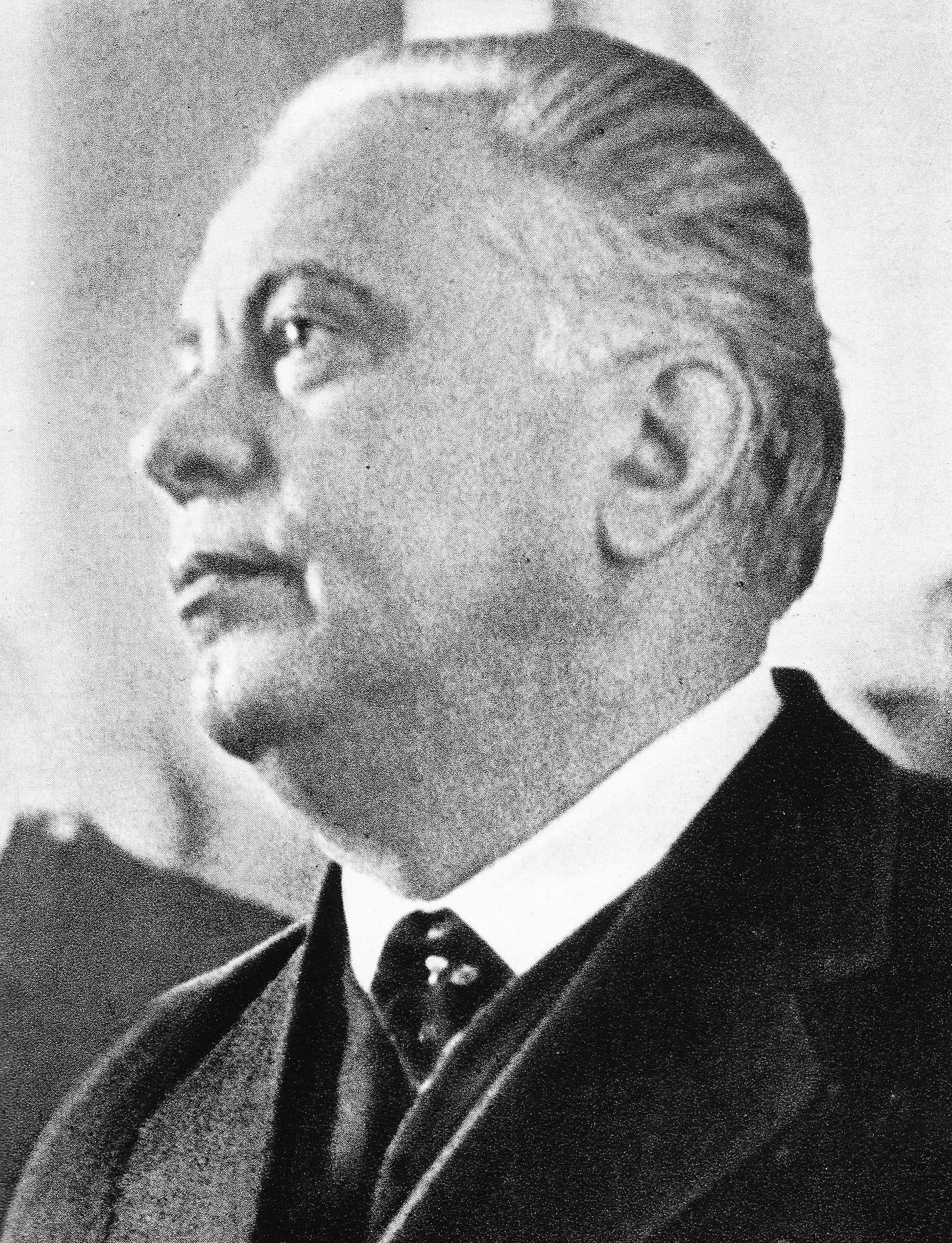
Bohdan Pniewski

Bohdan Wiktor Kazimierz Pniewski (26 August 1897 – 5 September 1965 in Warsaw) was a Polish modernist architect, professor at the Warsaw University of Technology and the Academy of Fine Arts in Warsaw. He is mostly known as a designer of state buildings in pre-war and post-war Poland, though the working conditions of an architect, in these eras, palpably varied. Pniewski, popular amongst the Polish political interwar elite (he was the designer of the Brühl Palace, which was the office of the Ministry of Foreign Affairs, headed by Józef Beck), remained prominent in Communist Poland. Surprisingly, "Beck's court architect" (nadworny architekt Becka), as he was called by his enemies after 1945 due to his role in designing the palace of the hated minister, constructed his most known buildings after the war - in the People's Republic of Poland.

== Life ==
=== Early years ===
Bohdan Pniewski was born as the fourth child of a bank official Wiktor Pniewski (1849-1918) and his second wife Helena z Kieszkowskich (1876-1965). In 1906-1914 he attended a secondary school (Szkoła Realna im. Stanisława Staszica), where he joined a scout troop. His education was continued at the Department of Building Construction of Hipolit Wawelberg and Stanisław Rotwand Mechanical and Technical School. In 1915 he failed in his first attempt to join the Faculty of Architecture at the Warsaw University of Technology, but was accepted on his second application, two years later.

His studies were suspended due to the First World War, in which Pniewski was involved, first as a scout and then as a soldier of the Polish Military Organisation. In November 1918 he helped to peacefully disarm German soldiers, remaining in Poland after the end of the war. But Bohdan Pniewski's war did not end in 1918, because like many young Poles his age, he decided to defend his country from the newly born Russian Soviet Federative Socialist Republic. He joined the Legions of Marshal Józef Piłsudski and this move soon turned out to be helpful in his career, because of the position of the former soldiers in the Second Republic. During the Polish-Soviet War, in 1920, he was wounded, which he proudly emphasized in the following years. During the treatment of his leg he met his future wife Elżbieta Dąbrowska (1900-1980) and was granted the Polish Cross of Valour for his bravery on the battlefield. He graduated from the Faculty of Architecture of the Warsaw University of Technology "with honours at the beginning of 1923, submitting as his thesis an architectural project for the Stock Exchange, supervised by Prof. Czesław Przybylski".

== Architecture ==
=== Interwar Poland ===
Pniewski's first work was the project for the Polish pavilion at the International Exhibition of Decorative Arts and Modern Industry, built in collaboration with Stanisław Brukalski and Lech Niemojewski in 1923. His first urban projects considered the redesigning of Radom, but were not carried out. Pniewski's first works were built in 1928 and as Piotr Kibort writes: "All of these projects have avant-garde architectural features, although Pniewski used these new forms primarily for their aesthetic values in order to achieve the effect of modernity, and not for the deliberate social programme or technology associated with them which motivated the leftist avant-garde artists of this period". His first works were the Sun settlement on Madalińskiego Street 83-95 in the Mokotów district, Strzecha Urzędnicza settlement on Kochowskiego and Niegolewskiego Street in the Żoliborz district, and Bogusław Herse Fashion House's exhibition pavilion for the National Exhibition in Poznań in 1929.

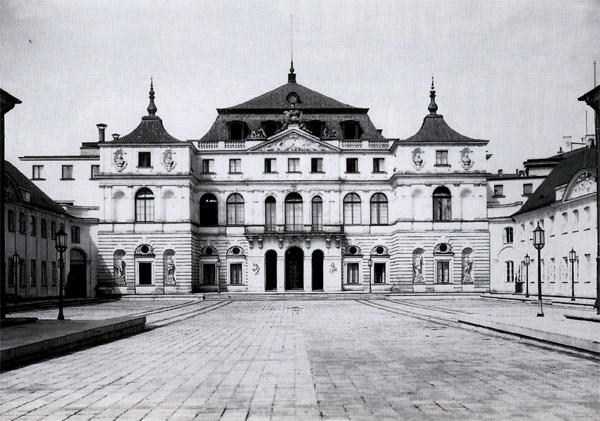
Brühl Palace

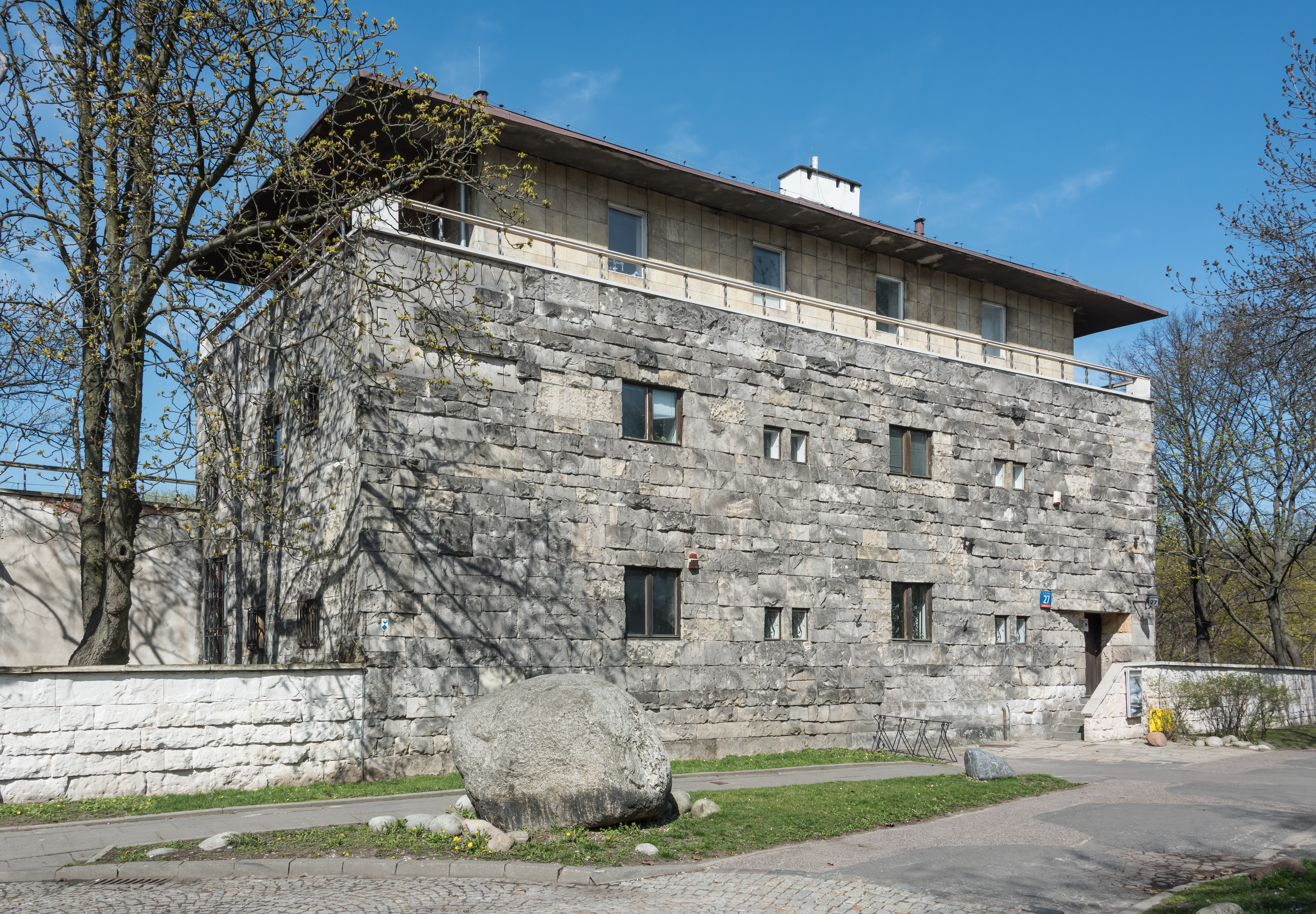
Pniewski's villa

Pniewski, however, gained wide recognition in Poland not for his avant-garde settlement projects but for his designs of state buildings. In 1928 he won a competition for the design of the Polish Legation building in Sofia, which still remains the Polish embassy in Bulgaria today. In the 1930s he won a contest for designing the Temple of Divine Providence, which was never constructed due to the high projected costs and controversies over whether such a building (a church donated by the state to the Catholic Church) should be funded by the government. In 1938 one of Pniewski's best known projects was successfully finished: the redesigning of the Brühl Palace - the office of the Ministry of Foreign Affairs. To this project Pniewski owes his pejorative, in Communist times, nickname: "Beck's of court architect" (nadworny architect Becka). The interiors of the building, redesigned by the architect in the modernist style, seemed overly expensive to the leaders of the post-war Poland.

Before the Second World War Pniewski constructed his own villa on Na Skarpie Avenue, which today hosts the Polish Academy of Sciences' Museum of the Earth, "located in the alleged premises of the Masonic Lodge designed by Szymon Bogumił Zug". A significant feature of the building is its library with ceramic plates with folkloric motifs on the ceiling. The villa remained Pniewski's home after the war and the architect's workplace until his death. The architect also designed, in the 1930s, Jan Kiepura's guesthouse in Krynica and Muszyński's house on Klonowa Street.

=== Postwar Poland ===
During the Second World War Pniewski continued to teach at the Warsaw University of Technology and the Academy of Fine Arts in Warsaw, but could not do it openly, so the venues of his lessons were kept a secret. He completed various architectural projects, but most of them remained on paper. After the war, due to the politically influenced changes at the universities, Pniewski was expelled from the Academy of Fine Arts and for a couple of years did not teach at the University of Technology. Nevertheless, he was still an influential architect and a popular one amongst the new Communist regime. Since all the projects were state funded, an architect could live only by cooperating with the government. Otherwise, a change of profession was necessary. Pniewski worked with the Communist regime, but tried to remain individually free.

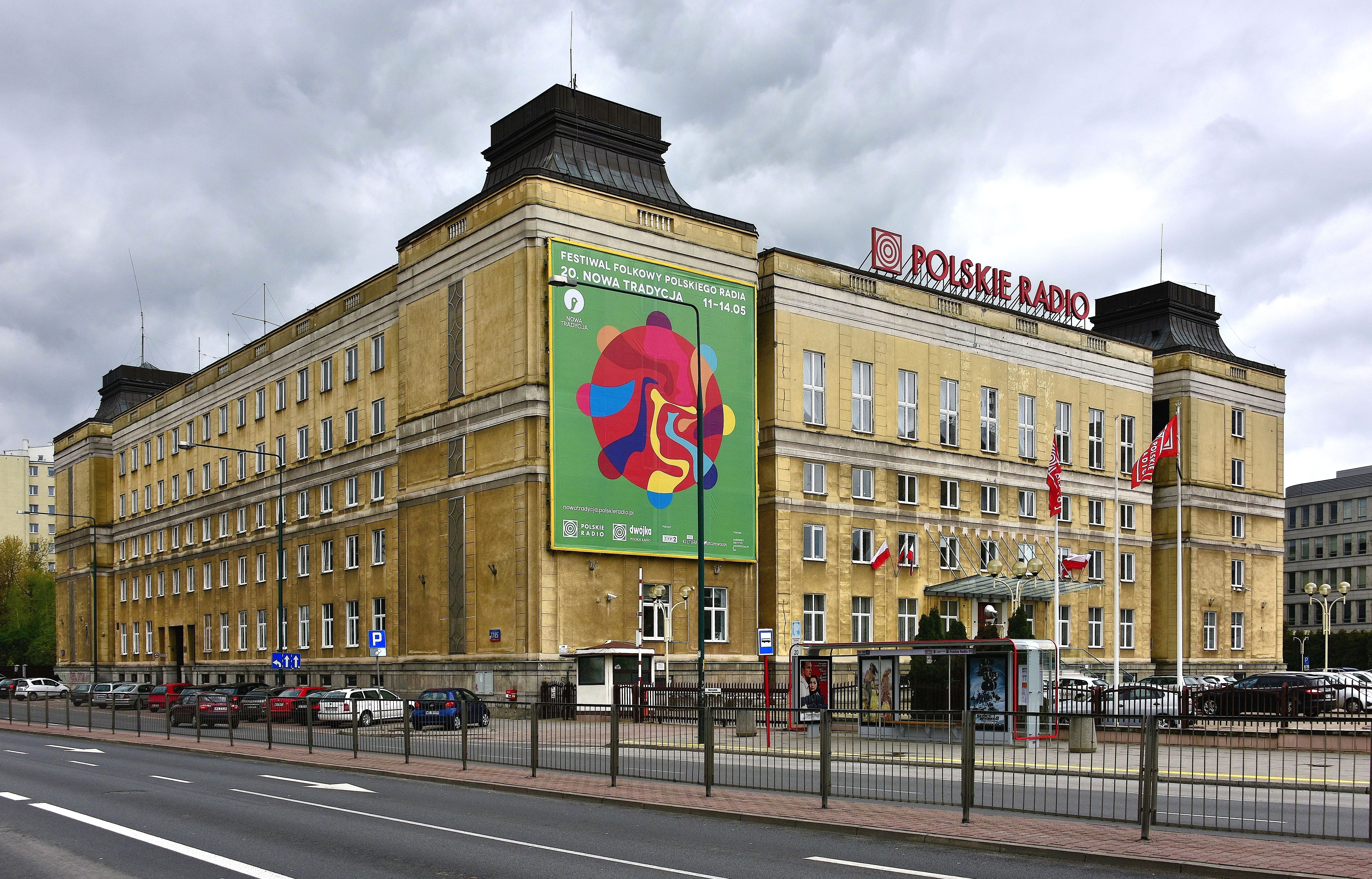
Polish Radio

In 1948 Pniewski designed the building of the National Bank of Poland (Narodowy Bank Polski). He also took part in the rebuilding of the Polish Parliament (Sejm) and this project became his most prestigious one. He also constructed the buildings of the Polish Radio, Szosa Krakowska settlement in the Ochota District, Dom Chłopa, and the State Archives on Hankiewicz Street. One of his hardest projects was the rebuilding and redesigning of the Grand Theatre – National Opera (Teatr Wielki – Opera Narodowa) after the tragic causes of the Warsaw Uprising. This building became a symbol of the architect's projects constructed in the People's Republic of Poland because it was built over the course of many years and the project was revised dozens of times, which made the architect furious.

Pniewski continued his teaching at the Warsaw University of Technology and after 1956 at Warsaw's Academy of Fine Arts. By his students he was called the "prince of architecture". Bohdan Pniewski died on September 5, 1965, in Warsaw – the city to which he had dedicated his whole life and work.

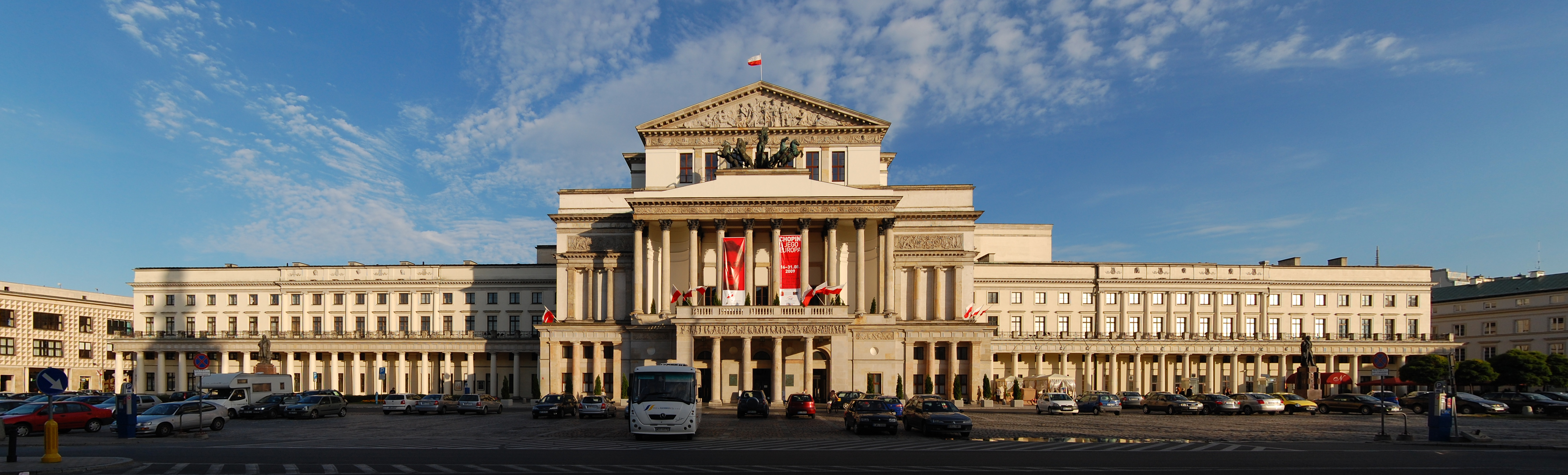
Grand Theatre – National Opera
