= Brühl Palace, Warsaw =

Residence in Warsaw

Coordinates: 52.242075°N 21.010305°E

Brühl Palace Pałac Brühla (in Polish)
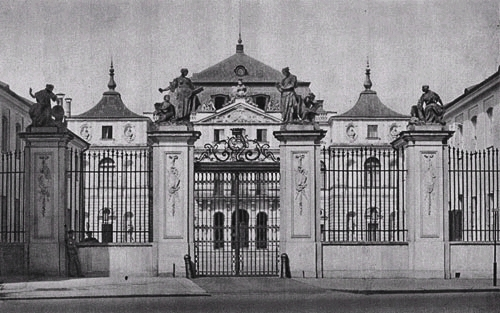
- Main gate and the corps de logis.
- Interactive map of the Brühl Palace; Pałac Brühla (in Polish) area

General information
- Architectural style: Baroque
- Location: Warsaw, Poland
- Construction started: 1639
- Completed: 1642
- Demolished: 1944
- Client: Jerzy Ossoliński

Design and construction
- Architects: Lorenzo de Sent, rebuilt by Tylman Gamerski (late 17th century) and Johann Friedrich Knöbel, Joachim Daniel von Jauch (18th century), Bohdan Pniewski (1932)

The Brühl Palace (Polish: Pałac Brühla), also known as the Sandomierski or Ossoliński Palace, was a palatial residence at Piłsudski Square in central Warsaw, Poland. It was one of the largest palaces and one of the finest examples of rococo architecture in pre-World War II Warsaw.

It is going to be rebuilt along with the Saski Palace, neighboring tenements and the modernist Beck's Pavilion; the tender was completed in 2023 and it is now at the project stage.

== History ==
=== Establishment of the palace ===
The palace was built between 1639 and 1642 by Lorenzo de Sent for Crown Grand Chancellor Jerzy Ossoliński in Mannerist style. It was built on the plan of an elongated rectangle with two hexagonal towers at garden side of the building. The palace was adorned with sculptures – an allegory of Poland above the main portal, four figures of kings of Poland in the niches and a statue of Minerva crowning the roof. A possible inspiration for the palace's upper pavilion and its characteristic roof was Bonifaz Wohlmut's reconstruction of Belvedere in Prague, 1557–1563.

After the Chancellor's death the property was inherited by his daughter Helena Tekla Ossolińska, wife of Aleksander Michał Lubomirski, Starost of Sandomierz (from whom it takes its name). Later, between 1681 and 1696, it was rebuilt and remodeled by Tylman Gamerski and Giovanni Bellotti for Prince Józef Karol Lubomirski – Aleksander Michał's son.

=== 18th century ===
In 1750, Heinrich von Brühl bought the palace as a residence. Between 1754 and 1759 it was rebuilt according to designs by Johann Friedrich Knöbel and Joachim Daniel von Jauch. The palace was enhanced and covered with a mansard roof. Two outbuildings were added to the palace complex surrounding a triangular courtyard that sometimes served as a parade ground. From that time the palace was known as the Brühl Palace.

On 27 May 1787, the palace played a key role in a plot by Russian ambassador to Poland, Otto Magnus von Stackelberg. He derailed yet another Polish policy which seemed threatening to Russia. With few major wars in the past decades, the economy of the Commonwealth was improving, and its budget had a notable surplus. Many voices said that the money should be spent on increasing the size, and providing new equipment for, the Polish army. However, as a large Polish army could be a threat to the Russian garrisons controlling Poland, von Stackelberg ordered his proxies in the Permanent Council to spend the money on a different goal: for the huge sum of 1 million zlotys (representing most of the surplus), the council bought the Brühl Palace – and promptly donated it to 'Poland's ally', Russia, to serve as Russia's new embassy.

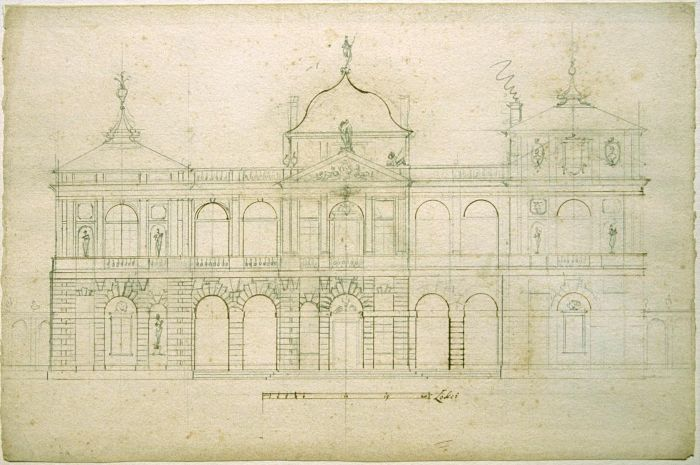
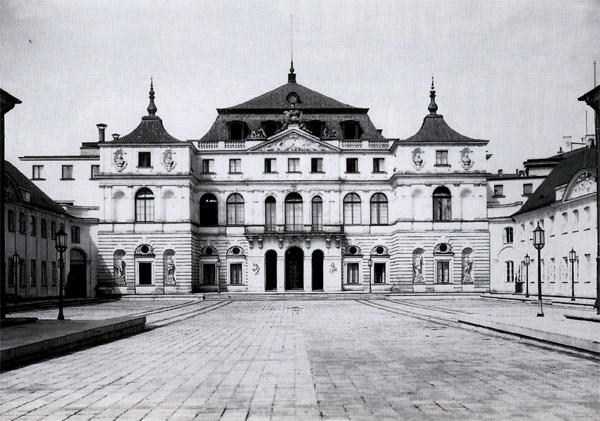
Left: Reconstruction design by Tylman Gamerski. Right: Ministry of Foreign Affairs, 1930s.

At the end of the eighteenth century, Dominik Merlini gave the interior a neoclassical look.

=== 20th century ===
During 1932–1937, the palace was adapted for use as the Ministry for Foreign Affairs of the new Polish Republic. The architect this time was Bohdan Pniewski, who added a new modern building and modernized the interiors of all the buildings in the palace complex.

It was deliberately and completely destroyed by the Germans on 18 December 1944 (during World War II, shortly after the Warsaw Uprising).

=== 21st century: Reconstruction plans ===
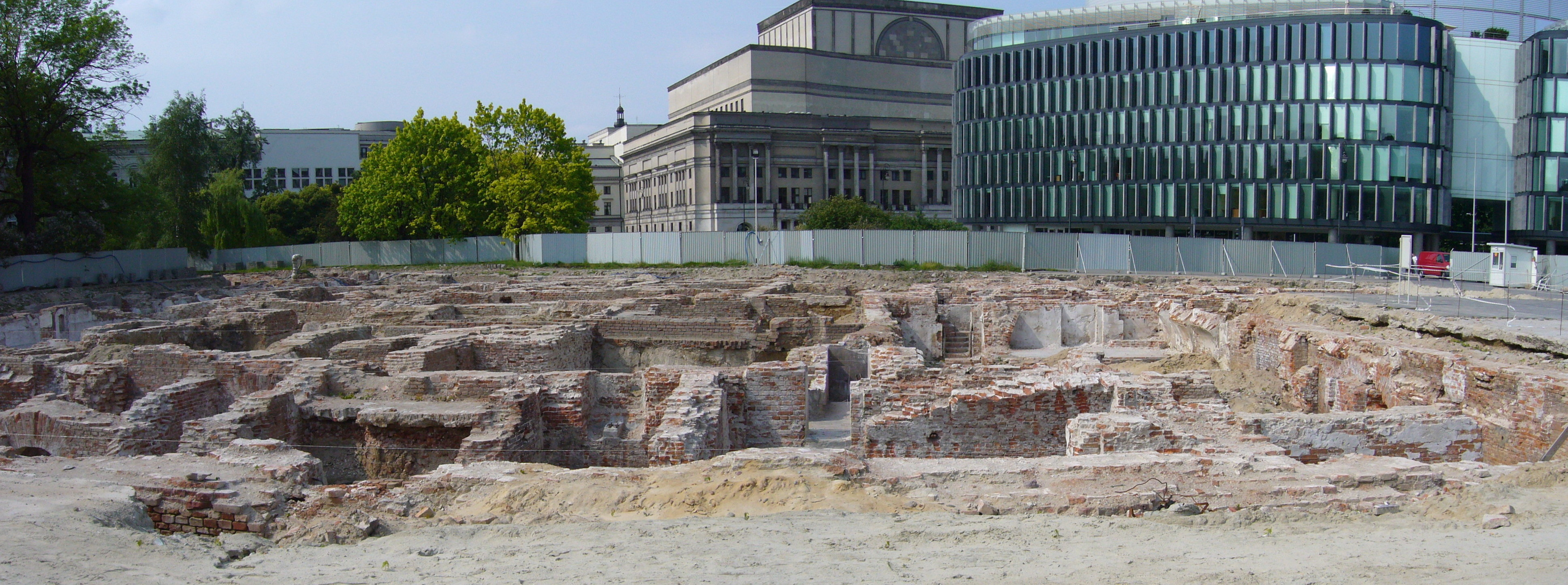
Foundations of the Brühl Palace, May 2007

Around 2008, Warsaw's municipal government authorities decided to rebuild the Brühl Palace. The new building was to have a facade referring to its historic shape, but a new private investor may adapt the interiors to the needs of either office space or a hotel.

On 11 November 2018, during celebrations of the 100th anniversary of Poland's restored independence, President Andrzej Duda signed a declaration on the rebuilding of the Brühl Palace. In July 2021 Duda submitted to the Sejm a draft act on the reconstruction of the Brühl Palace, Saxon Palace, and three tenement houses at Królewska Street in Warsaw, which was passed later that month.

== See also ==
- Saxon Palace
- Saxon Garden
- Saxon Axis
- Piłsudski Square
- Kotowski Palace

== Gallery ==
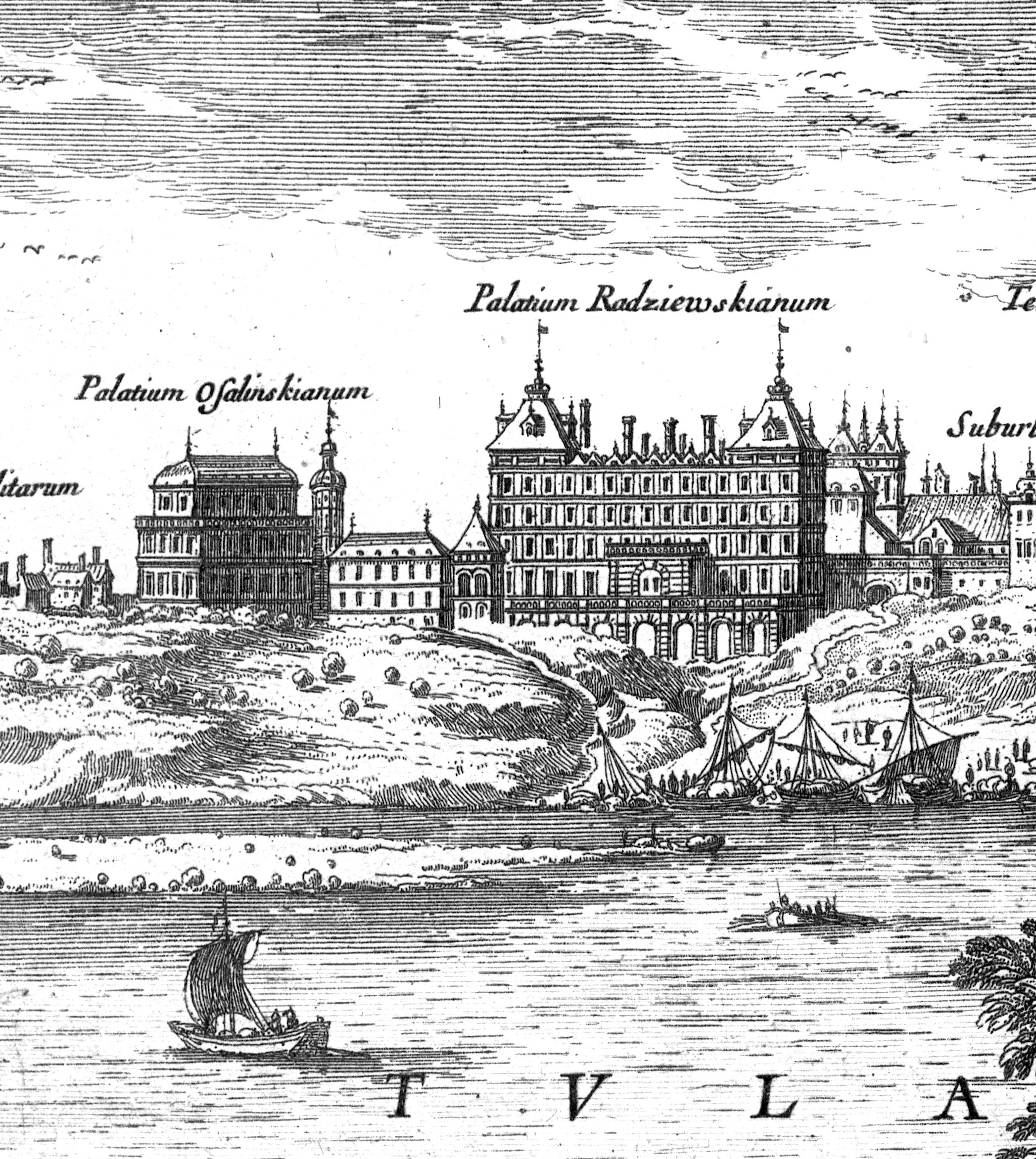
Ossoliński Palace (left) and Kazanowski Palace (right) in the 1650s

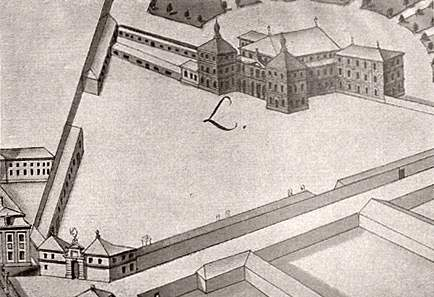
As Lubomirski Palace - L. (before 1754)

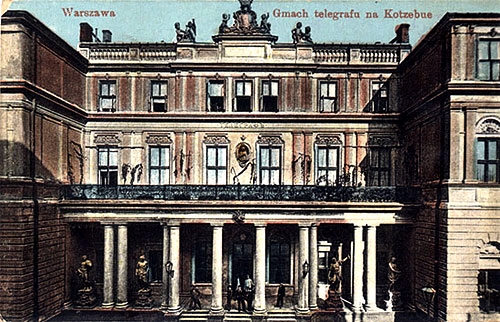
Rear façade of the palace (before 1915)

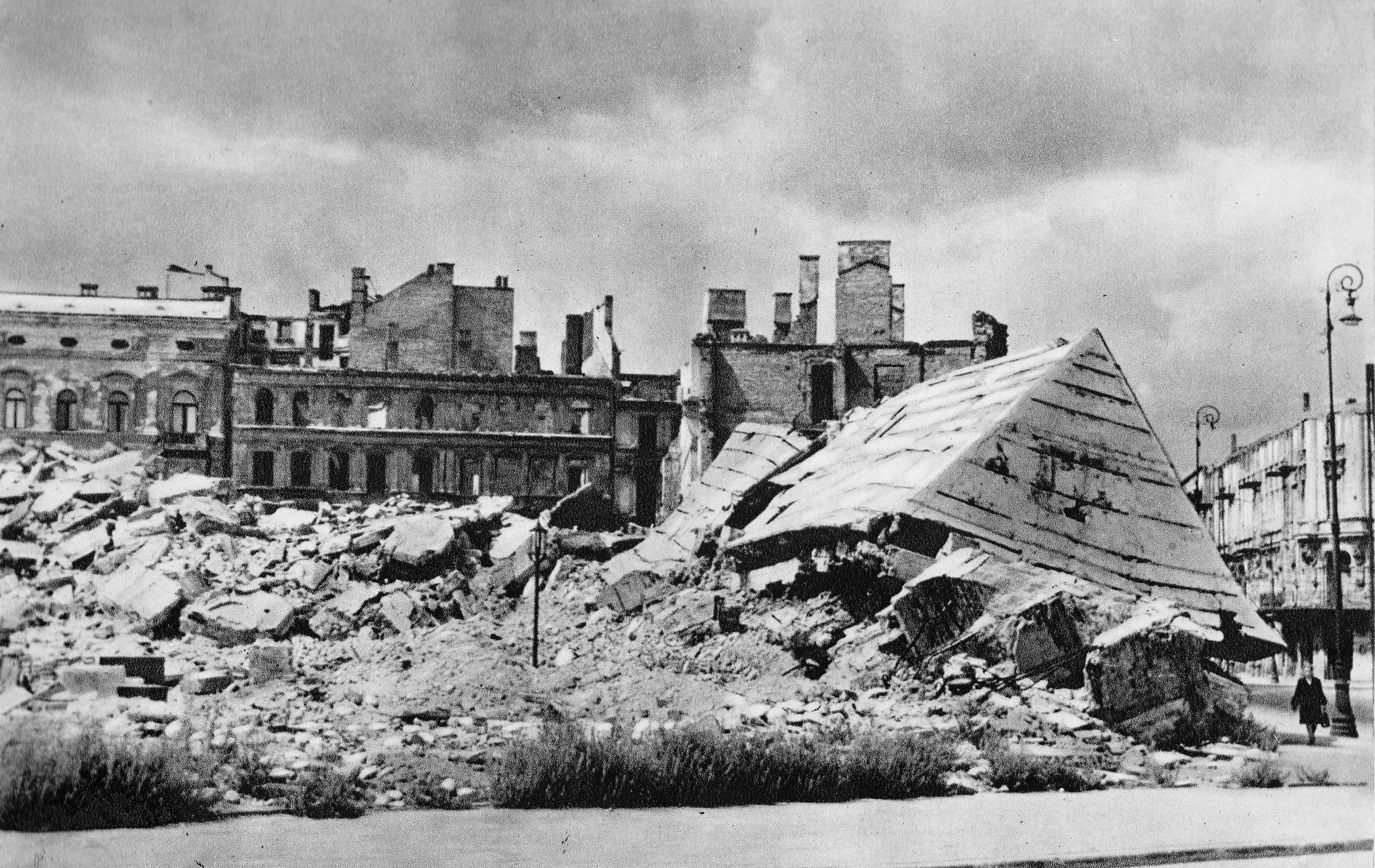
Palace after the war

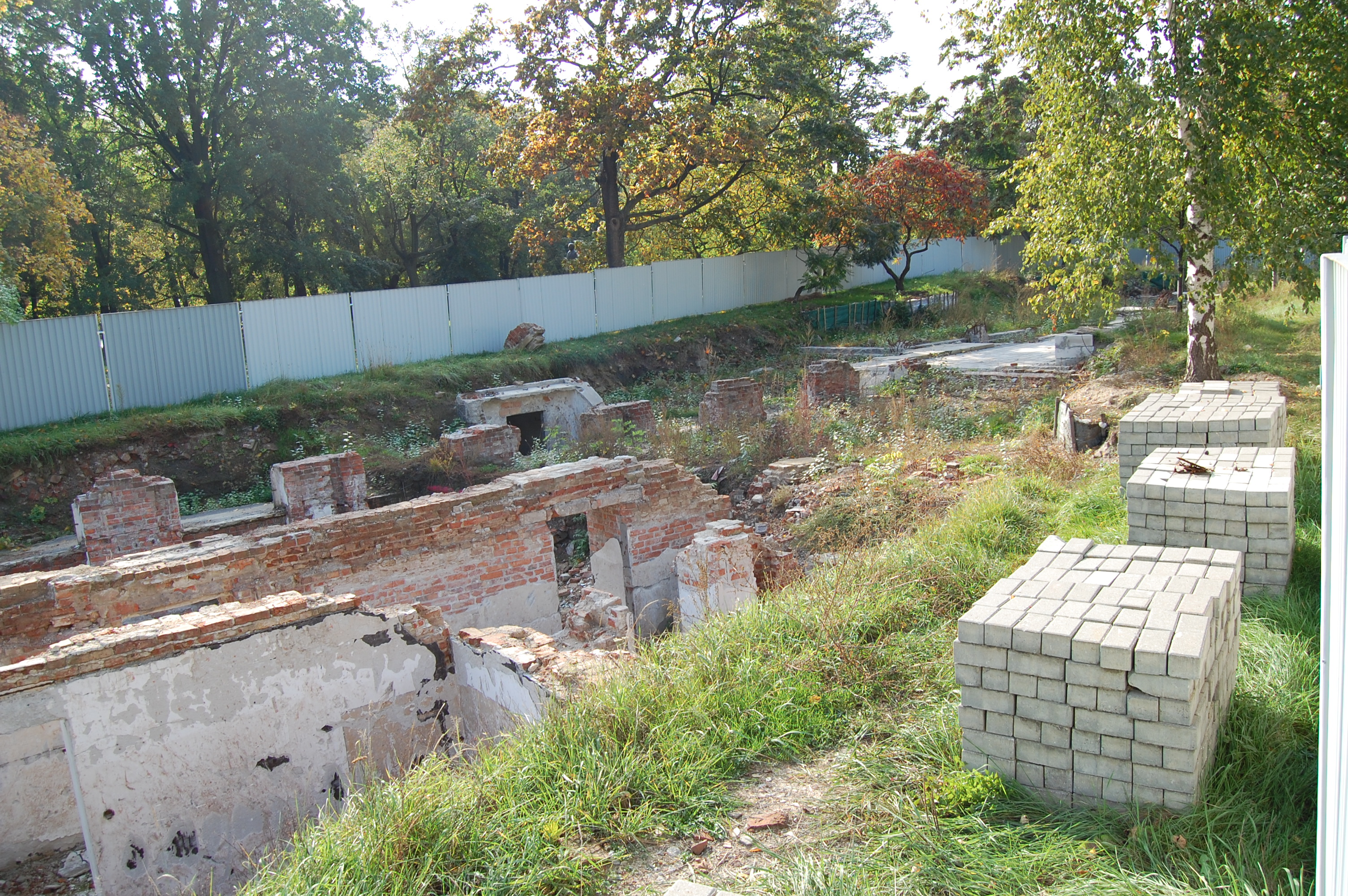
Foundations of Brühl Palace
