= Boguslaw Herse Fashion House =

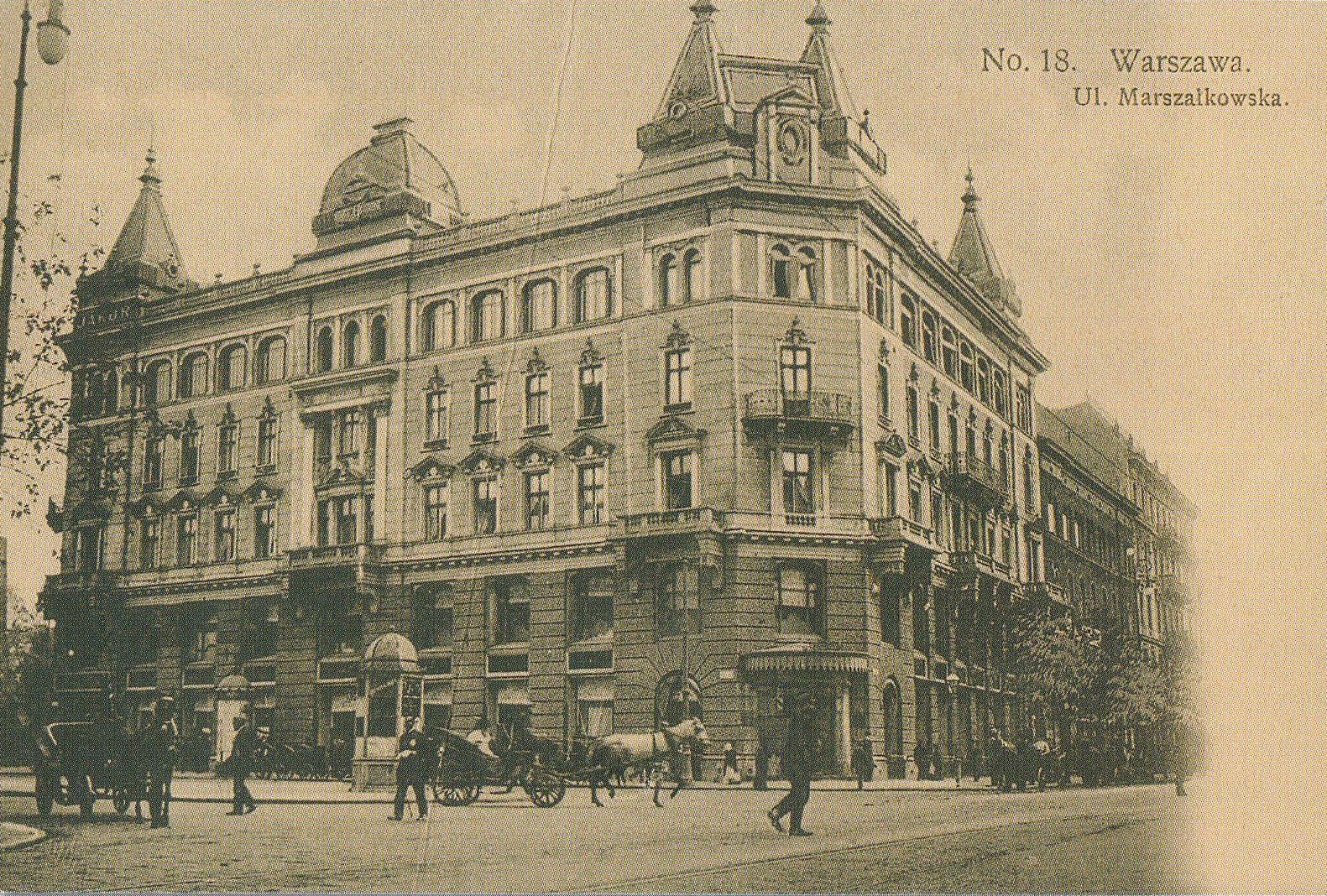

General information
- Location: Warsaw, Poland, 150 Marszałkowska Street, Warsaw
- Owner: Bogusław Herse

Design and construction
- Architect: Józef Huss

Boguslaw Herse Fashion House (Polish: Dom Mody Bogusław Herse) was a fashion house and department store in Warsaw, Poland, operating during the interwar period.

== History ==
The Herse family hails from France. In the 13th century, its members were lawyers at princely courts. The ancestors of today's Herse family were Huguenots and likely lived in the northern part of the country. During the religious persecutions between 1562 and 1685, the family fled France and took refuge in one of the German duchies. We find traces of the family in the 18th century in the Grand Duchy of Poznań, which was then part of Prussia. Gotfried Leberecht Herse (1774–1828) was married to Natalia Klossin and, after her death, to her sister Rozyna. He owned a bakery in Krotoszyn and later established a mechanical bakery in Poznań.

His son, Ernest Wilhelm Herse (1802–1881), was born in Stęszew and never showed any interest in a career as a baker. He completed practical agricultural studies in Halle and purchased the Gnuszyn estate near Pniewy in the Piła County. After some time, he decided to sell it and invested the proceeds in another estate—this time Radłowo near Września. There, he became the first to cultivate sugar beets, which in the first half of the 19th century replaced sugar cane, which was subject to import blockade. Ernest was also the manager of Count Seweryn Mielżyński's estates near Radłowo. He formed a lifelong friendship with the count. Ernest was artistically talented—he painted and drew. He always considered himself Polish and joined the November Uprising without hesitation, along with his friend the count and the estate's forester. He married Augustyna Werner, with whom he had nine children. Their eldest son, Jarosław, completed law studies in Poznań, was a notary, and a deputy mayor of Poznań.

With the money from the sale of the Radłowo estate, Ernest bought a carriage and a pair of horses, using the remainder to provide for his children. Three of them—Bogusław Maciej, Adam Szczepan, and Ferdynand Robert—founded a company in Warsaw in 1868, which later became known as Bogusław Herse Fashion House. His co-owner was Bogusław Maciej Herse's son, Bogusław Władysław Herse (1872–1943).

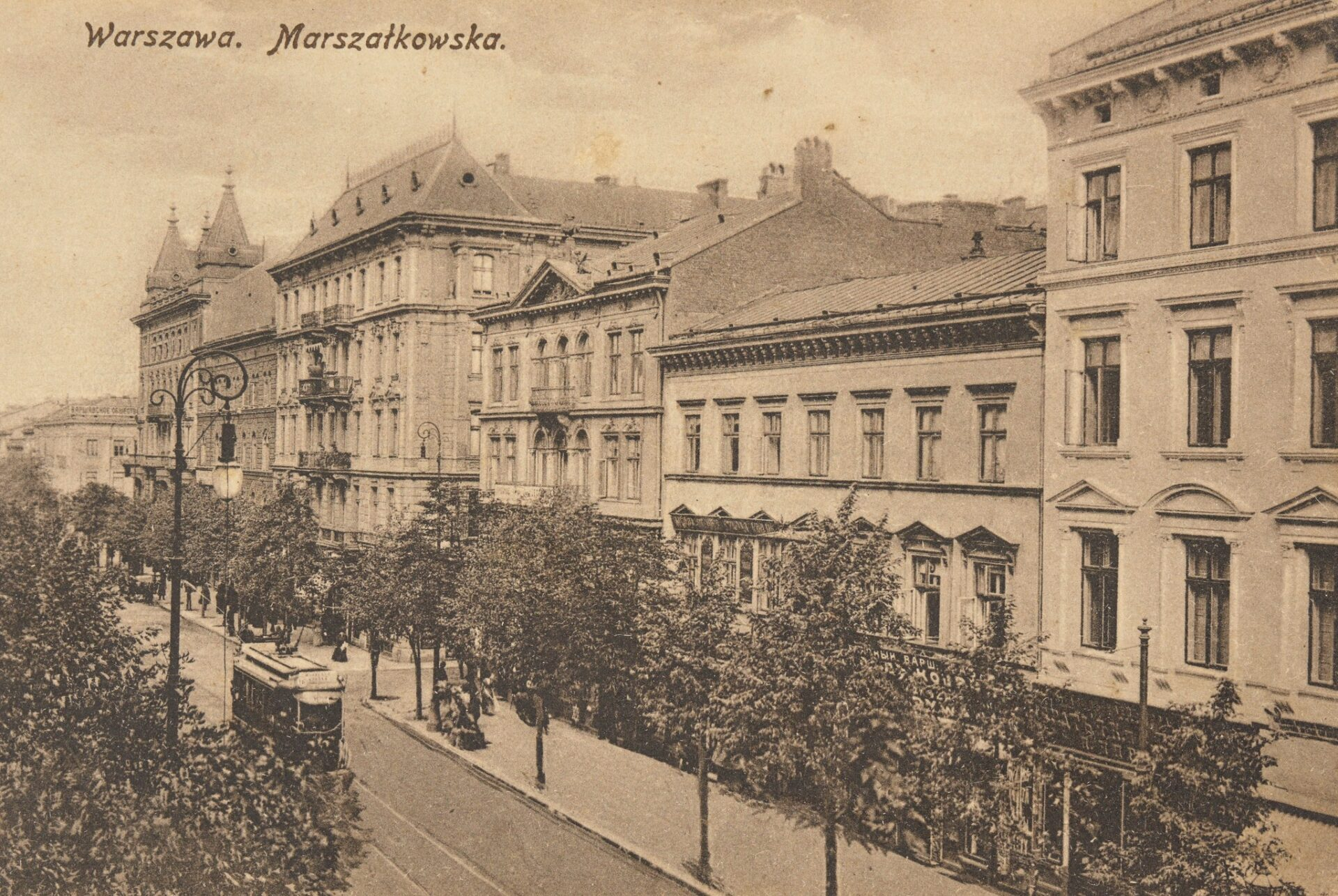
Marszałkowska Street, with Boguslaw Herse Fashion House in the distance.

The company operated at 10 Senatorska Street under the name "Handel Koronek i Towarów Białych oraz Magazyn Mód Bogusław Herse." In 1899, it was moved to a newly built building between Marszałkowska Street, Erywańska Street (later Kredytowa Street), Zielony Square (later Dąbrowskiego Square), and Szkolna Street.

The luxurious tenement house was designed by the Warsaw architect Józef Huss. Sales took place on the ground floor and the first floor, the second floor was occupied by the owners, the third floor was rented out to tenants, and the fourth floor was used for tailoring clothing. The assortment was greatly influenced by Bogusław Maciej Herse's wife, Filipina z Kotków (1842–1925). In 1926, the building was significantly damaged by a fire. It was one of the first Polish companies to utilize advertising power, buying full-page ads, publishing a seasonal catalog of merchandise, and organizing fashion shows, with one of the models being Stefania Grodzieńska. In 1936, the company ceased making clothes. By the end of the interwar period, the building housed, among other things, the Polish-American Chamber of Commerce.
