= Nowy Świat-Uniwersytet metro station =

Warsaw metro station

Nowy Świat-Uniwersytet
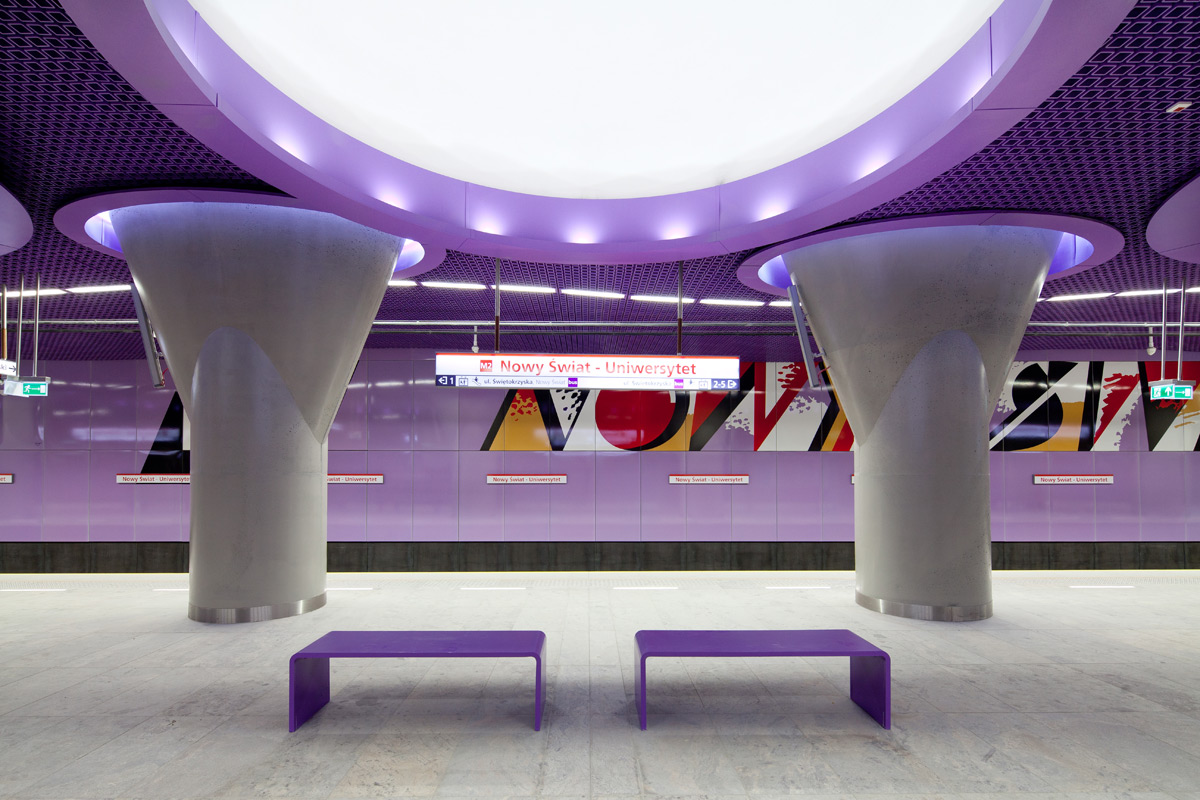

General information
- Coordinates: 52°14′13.5″N 21°1′4.5″E
- Owner: ZTM Warszawa
- Platforms: 1 island platform
- Tracks: 2
- Connections: 106, 178, 518; N14, N16, N44, N64

Construction
- Structure type: Underground
- Platform levels: 1
- Accessible: Yes

Other information
- Station code: C-12
- Fare zone: 1

History
- Opened: 8 March 2015; 11 years ago
- Former names: Nowy Świat (In planning phase)

Services
Preceding station	Warsaw Metro	Following station
Świętokrzyska towards Bemowo	M2 line	Centrum Nauki Kopernik towards Bródno
Location
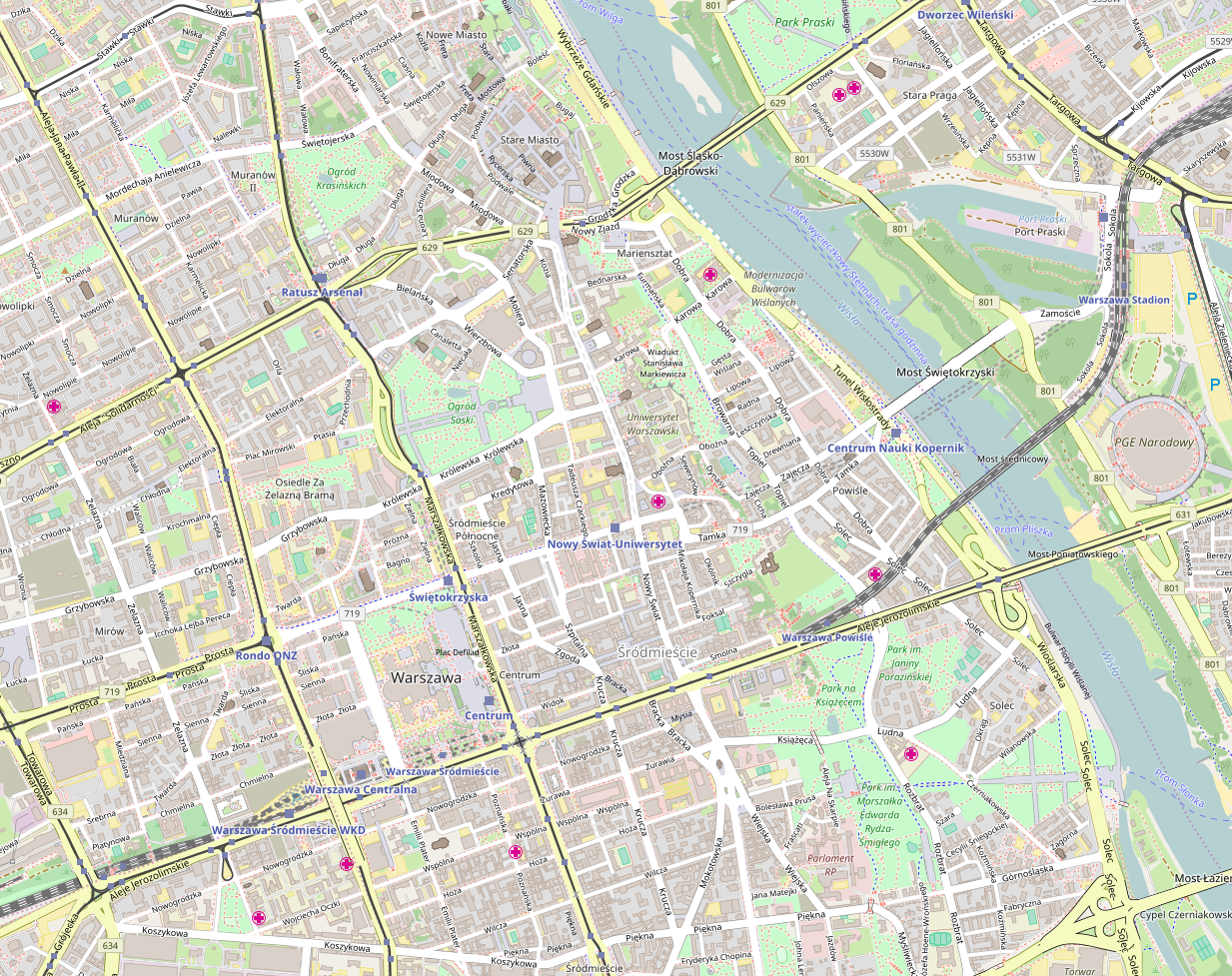
- Location within Warsaw Location within Masovian Voivodeship

Nowy Świat-Uniwersytet is a station on the central part of Line M2 of the Warsaw Metro.

The station fully opened for passenger use on 8 March 2015 as part of the inaugural stretch of Line M2 between Rondo Daszyńskiego and Dworzec Wileński. It was designed by Polish architect Andrzej M. Chołdzyński and constructed by Metroprojekt. Murals were created by Wojciech Fangor, artist of the Polish School of Posters.

The station is near the intersection of Świętokrzyska and Nowy Świat Streets, as well as the location of the main campus of the University of Warsaw and the Ministry of Finance building. Piłsudski Square can also be accessed by a seven-minute walk north-north-west of the station.

== Gallery ==
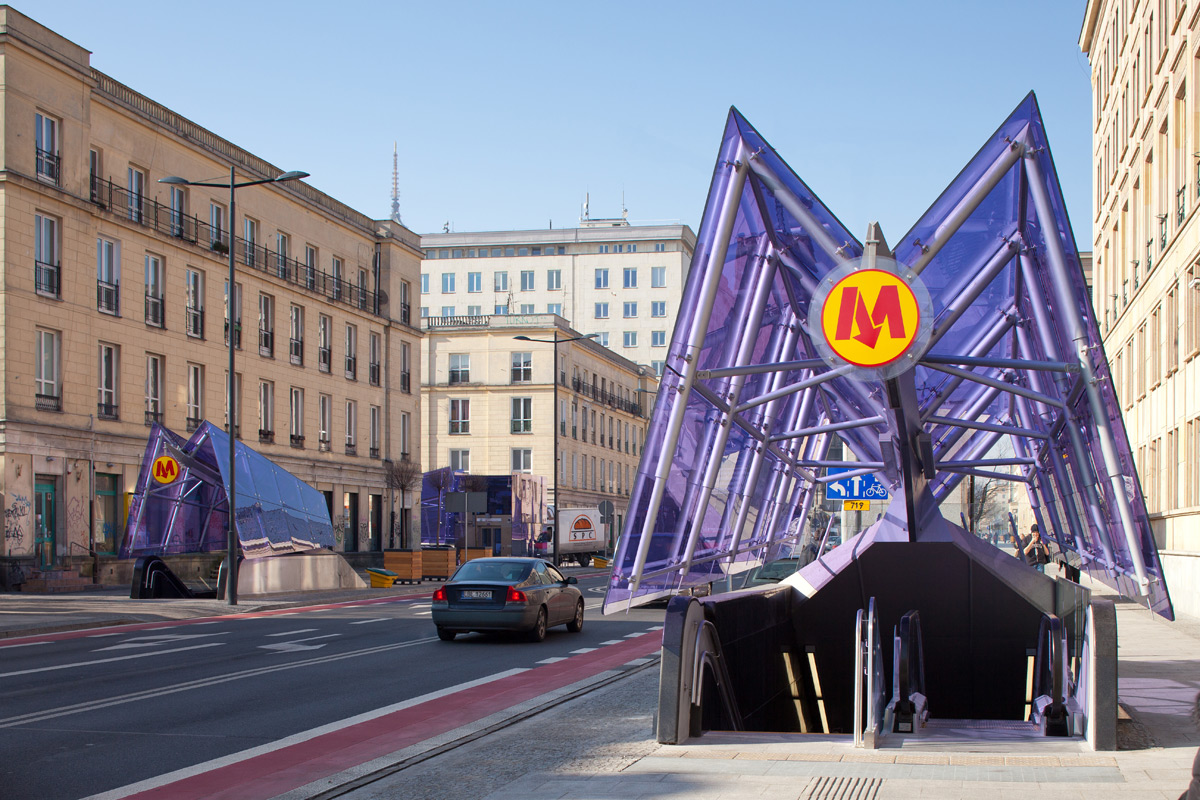
Entrance to the station

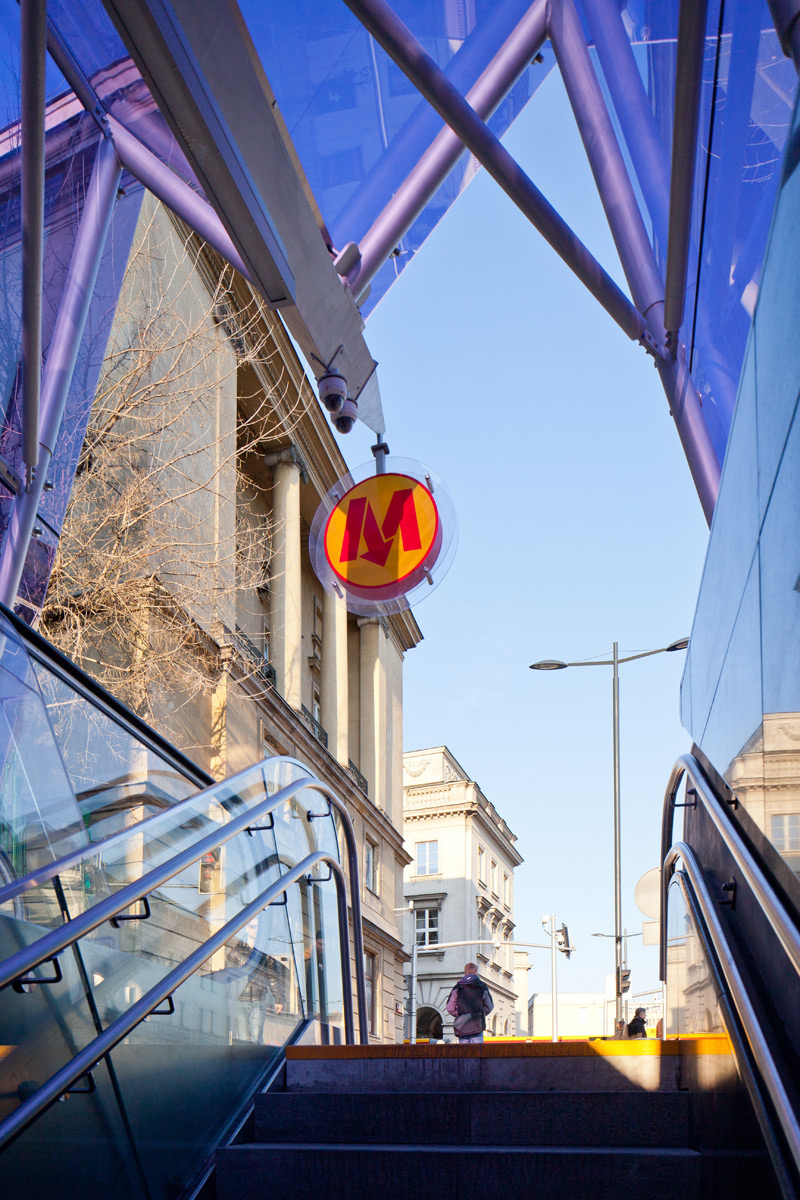
Entrance to the station

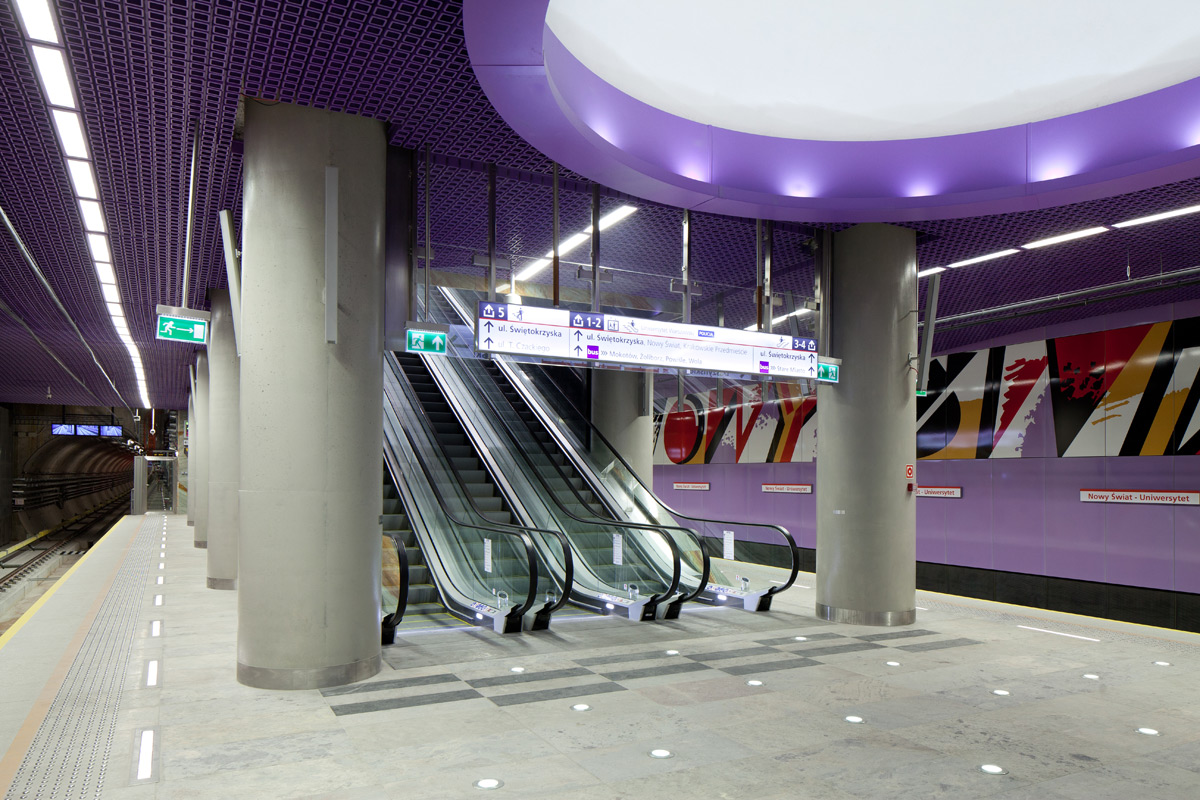
Main platform

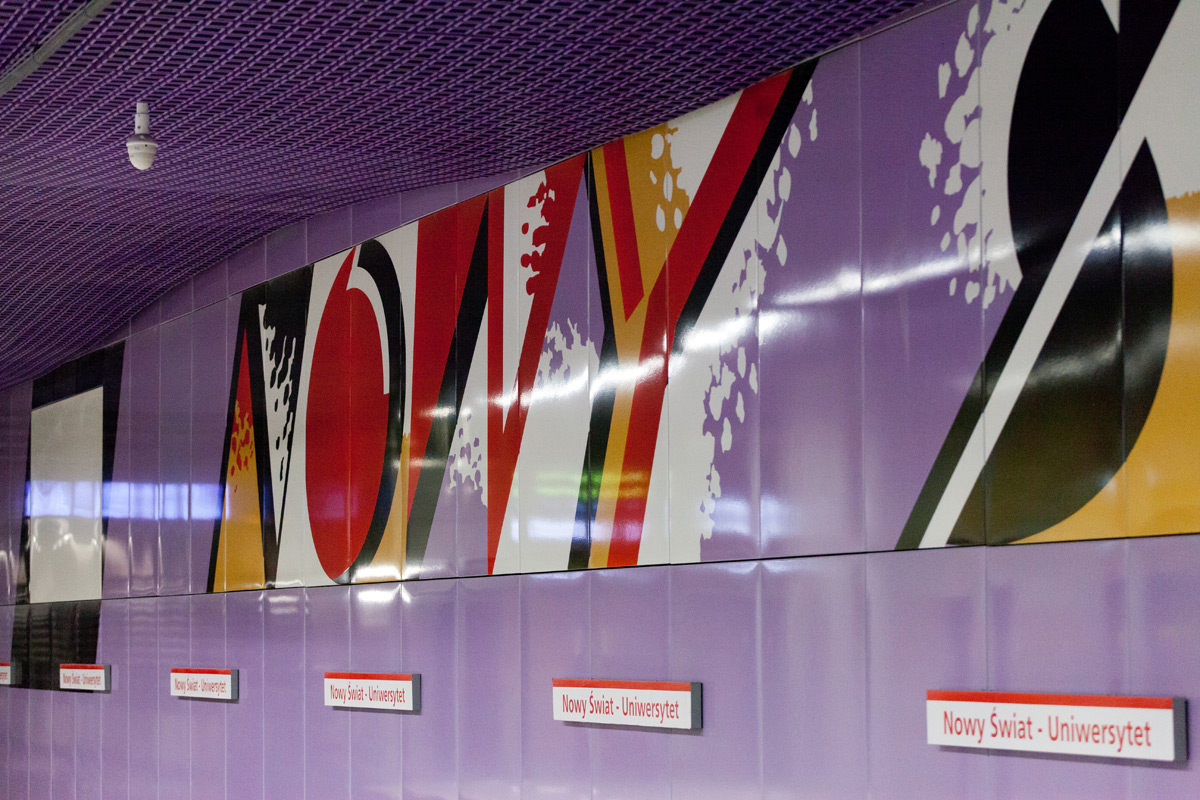
Interior detail, murals designed by Wojciech Fangor
