= Institute of Art Propaganda =

Institute of Art Propaganda Instytut Propagandy Sztuki (IPS)
- Seat of the Institute of Art Propaganda during the International Woodcut Exhibition (1933)
- Formation: 1930
- Dissolved: 1939
- Legal status: Dissolved
- Location: Warsaw
- Region served: Second Polish Republic
- Official language: Polish

Institute of Art Propaganda (Polish: Instytut Propagandy Sztuki) was a cultural institution operating in the Second Polish Republic from 1930 to 1939 and based in Warsaw, established at the initiative of artists and art historians to promote Polish modern art.

== History ==
The first headquarters of the IPS was located in the Baryczek tenement house in the Old Town Market Square. In December 1931, the Institute's newly constructed pavilion at 13 Królewska Street opened.

At the time of its establishment, the Institute represented an opposition to the conservative Society for the Encouragement of Fine Arts. The IPS's profile changed somewhat in the second half of the 1930s, when, in addition to purely exhibition activities (organizing the so-called IPS Salons), it also began to conduct research, popularization, and documentation. The co-founders and subsequent heads of the IPS Council were: Władysław Skoczylas (1930), Wojciech Jastrzębowski (1931), Karol Stryjeński (1932), Bohdan Pniewski (1934–1935), and Juliusz Starzyński (1935–1939). Other co-founders of the IPS included the art historian and museologist Mieczysław Treter and the art popularizer and critic Jerzy Warchałowski.

The Institute also served a social function in pre-war Warsaw. At the initiative of Stanisław Rzecki, a café was established in the IPS exhibition pavilion, which eventually became one of the most popular venues for artists – painters and poets in Warsaw. From 1937, the institute published the quarterly "Nike", edited by Juliusz Starzyński. The magazine's graphic design was the work of Stanisław Ostoja-Chrostowski.

The Institute of Art of the Polish Academy of Sciences draws on the IPS's scholarly tradition. Both institutions were headed by Juliusz Starzyński.

== Headquarters ==
The spacious single-story building was designed by Karol Stryjeński as the headquarters and exhibition pavilion for the Institute of Art Propaganda. It opened in December 1931. The building also housed a café and the editorial office of the weekly "Wiadomości Literackie".

In 1935, a fire engulfed part of the building. This likely resulted in the removal of some of the shop windows to the right of the main entrance and their conversion into average-sized windows. During the German occupation, the pavilion served as an inn for soldiers of opposing armies. It escaped destruction during the Warsaw Uprising and the subsequent German demolition of Warsaw, sustaining only minor shell damage. A section of the building adjacent to Kronenberg Palace also suffered damage. In the summer of 1946, renovations began on the building, intended to house the Soldiers' Home Musical Theatre. The work was completed in February 1947. In 1955, the pavilion became the home of the Jewish Theatre, which occupied it until 1970. Demolition work began shortly thereafter for Warsaw's most luxurious hotel at the time, the Victoria Hotel.
