= Transport in Warsaw =

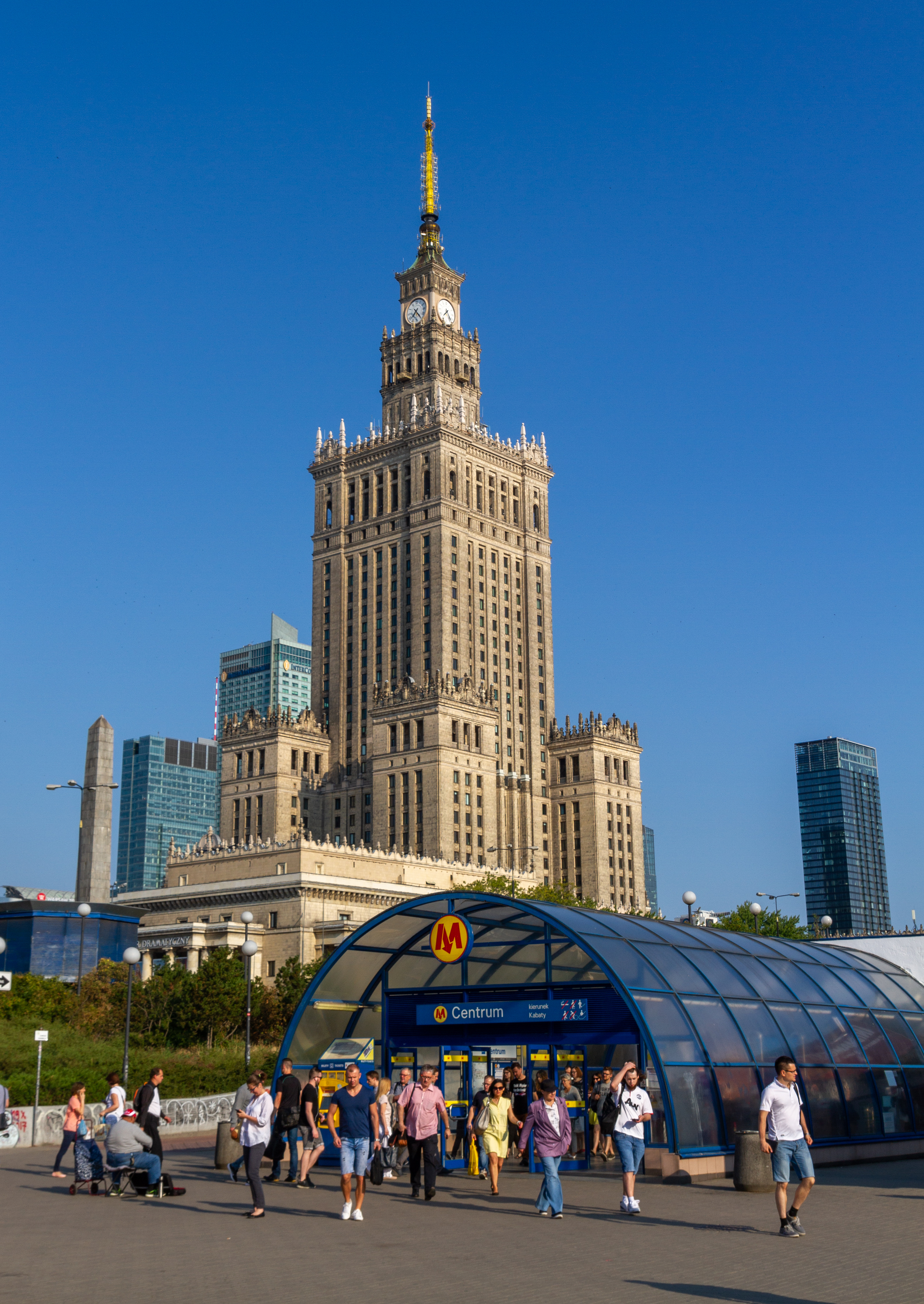
- Central Warsaw, the busiest part of the city

Overview
- Locale: Warsaw and surrounding regions
- Transit type: Rapid transit, commuter rail, buses, private automobile, taxicab, bicycle, pedestrian, tram
- Website: https://www.wtp.waw.pl

Warsaw has seen major infrastructural changes over the past few years amidst increased foreign investment and economic growth. The city has a much improved infrastructure with new roads, flyovers, bridges, etc. Public transport in Warsaw is ubiquitous, serving the city with buses, tramways, urban railway and Metro.

Although many streets were widened, and new ones were created, during the rebuilding of Warsaw in the 1950s, the city is currently plagued with traffic problems. The main reason is that in the Communist times, the traffic was small due to the low number of private cars – not only because of the prices of cars, but also because of a hard to obtain special coupon necessary to buy a car. Traffic engineers did not foresee the drastically large increase in the number of cars: in 2022, there were over 2 million cars registered in Warsaw (though some of the cars might be registered in the city yet used elsewhere). An additional problem was the lack of public transport as well as a beltway around the city. Mayor Stefan Starzyński had planned both prior to World War II but never lived to see those plans realized. Today, travelers typically must pass through the center of town for cross-town itineraries. Additionally, there are few parking places in the city center and street works are being carried out throughout the day. One line of the Warsaw Metro is complete and the second line consisting of 13 stations has also been completed. The city’s government also has plans to limit the car traffic in the city center including “Park and ride” car parks and a zone of toll parking). Public transport in Warsaw is ubiquitous, serving the city with buses, tramways, urban railway and Metro.

== Roads and highways ==
The express ring road of Warsaw is mostly completed.

Warsaw currently has a highway ring road consisting of 75% of the planned route. S8 (north-west), S2 (south) and S17 (east). The S8 and S2 expressways are finished while S17 is currently in the planning stages. A second ring road bypassing the Warsaw metropolitan area is also in the planning stages. It will consist of the A50 (south) and S50 (north). There are 4 major highways leading in and out of Warsaw connecting it to the rest of Poland. Motorway A2 west towards Łódź, Poznań and the Germany–Poland border, and east towards Siedlce and the Belarus–Poland border. Expressway S8 south-west towards Katowice, Wrocław and the Czech Republic–Poland border and north-east towards Białystok and the Lithuania–Poland border. Expressway S7 south towards Kraków and north towards Gdańsk. Expressway S17 south-east towards Lublin.

There are 2,600 kilometres (1,600 mi) of streets in Warsaw. The supervising body is the City Roads Authority (ZDM – Zarząd Dróg Miejskich).

The National Roads (Polish: Droga krajowa) running through Warsaw:

- DK 2 / E30 – Świecko (German–Polish border)-Poznań-Warsaw-Terespol (Belarussian–Polish border)
- DK 7 / E77 – Gdańsk-Warsaw-Kraków-Chyżne (Slovak-Polish border)
- DK 8 / E67 – Budziska (Polish–Lithuanian border)-Białystok-Warsaw-Wrocław-Kudowa Zdrój (Czech–Polish border)
- DK 17 / E372 – Warsaw-Lublin-Hrebenne (Polish–Ukrainian border)
- DK 61 – Warsaw-Łomża-Augustów
- DK 79 – Warsaw-Sandomierz-Kraków-Katowice

== Bridges ==
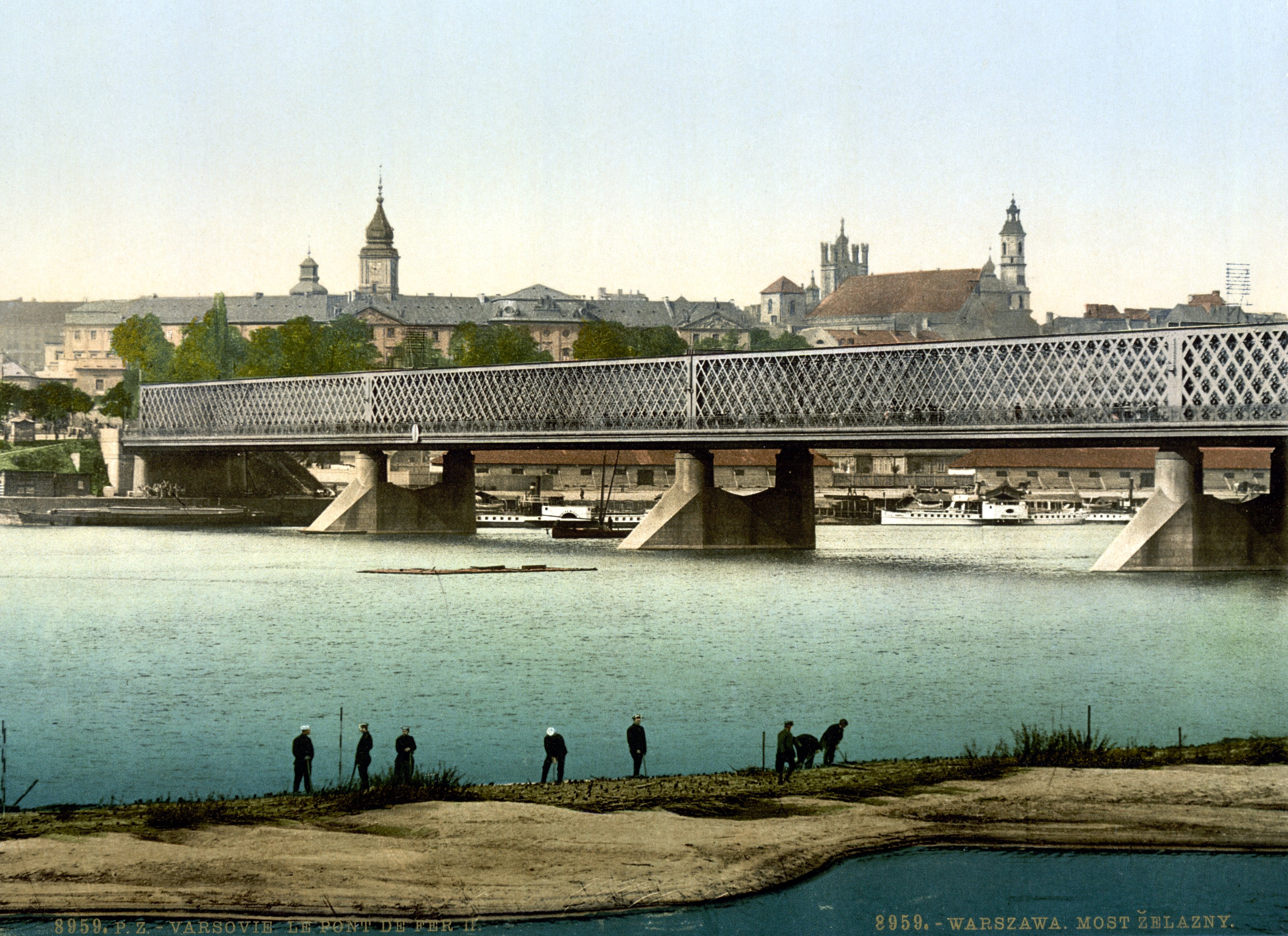
Iron Bridge over Vistula in Warsaw (c. 1900). This framework bridge was constructed by Stanisław Kierbedź in 1850-1864. It was destroyed by the Germans in 1944.

The first bridge existed in Warsaw between 1576 and 1603: King Sigismund II Augustus built it near the north part of the city wall. The bridge was destroyed in 1603 by an ice floe. Nowadays, the Bridge street (ulica Mostowa) exists on this place. Between 1775 and 1794, the next bridge existed south of the Royal Castle. It was pulled down by insurgents of the Kościuszko Uprising to prevent the Russian troops from getting to Warsaw.

In 1864, Stanisław Kierbedź built the first iron road bridge on stone supports. The bridge was then named Most Kierbedzia (Kierbedź Bridge) and was one of the most modern bridges in Europe of that time. In 1915, the retreating Russian army demolished it, then Poles rebuilt it and in 1944 it was demolished again by Germans. In 1949, on the same supports, a completely new bridge was built, which was named Śląsko-Dąbrowski – to commemorate the workers' crews from Silesia.

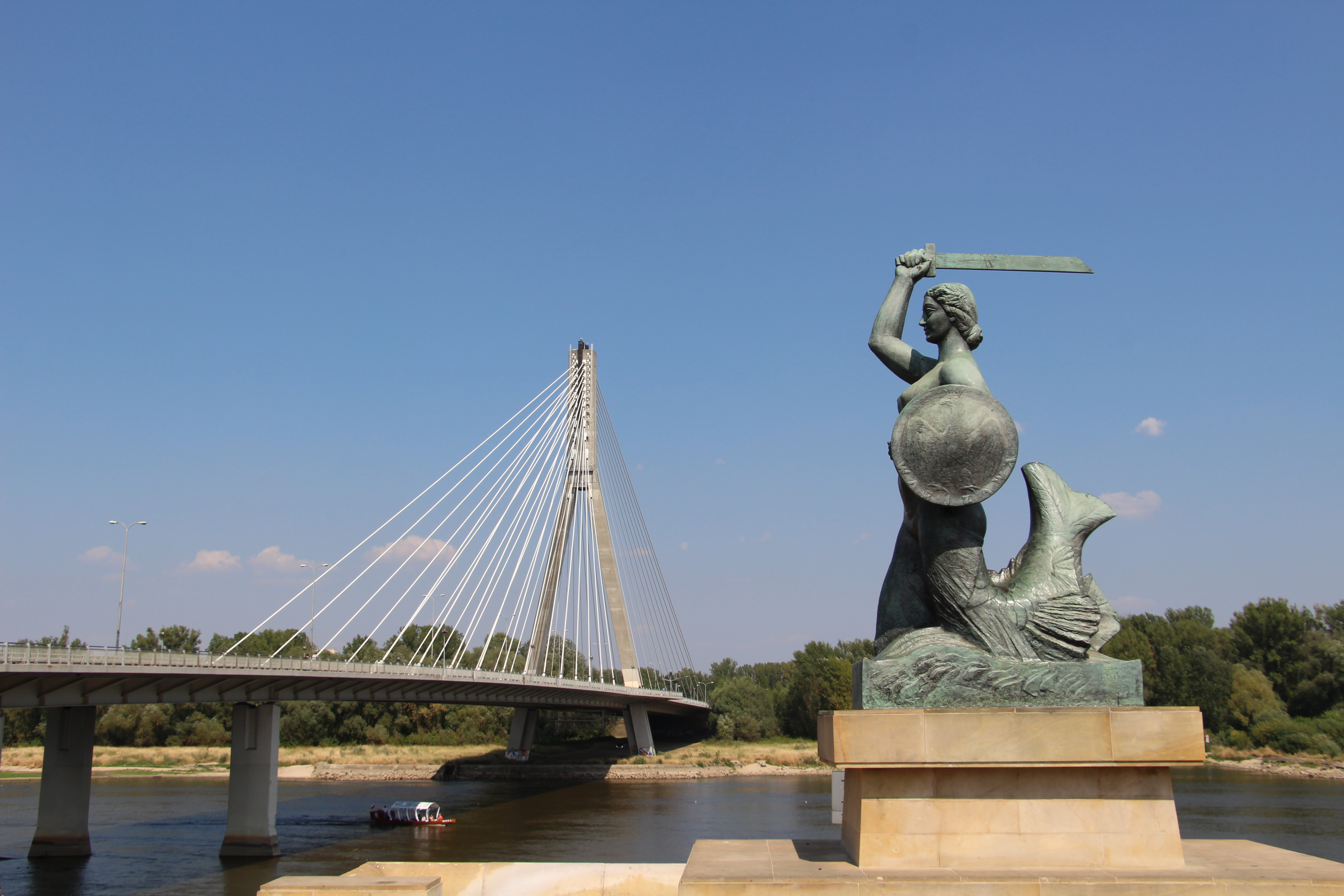
Świętokrzyski Bridge

In 1914, the Poniatowski Bridge was built. Its name derives not from the King Stanisław August Poniatowski’s name, but from the name of his nephew – Prince Józef Antoni Poniatowski who was the Commander-in-Chief of the Army of Duchy of Warsaw and fought at Napoleon Bonaparte’s side. The bridge was also pulled down by Russians in 1915. The Poles rebuilt it only in 1926, then in 1944 Germans demolished it again and one year later it was rebuilt once more.

Between 1985 and 1990, the bridge was being renovated, therefore, soldiers built a substitute bridge ca. 700 metres (2,300 ft) to the north of the Poniatowski Bridge. The new bridge was named Mermaid Bridge (Most Syreny). Despite the fact that it was only a temporary bridge, it was not dismantled when, in 1990, the overhaul of the Poniatowski Bridge was completed – traffic had become so heavy that both bridges were necessary. Mermaid Bridge was dismantled only in 2000 when the Świętokrzyski Bridge had been built a few meters to the north.

There are nine road bridges in Warsaw. Listed from the north, these are the following:

- Maria Skłodowska-Curie Bridge (2012) - 795 metres (2,608 ft) long, it will be a part of the northern beltway (OEW). The Warsaw citizens call it Northern Bridge (Most Północny).
- General Stefan "Grot" Rowecki Bridge or Toruński (1981) – 645 metres (2,116 ft) long, the most frequented bridge in Warsaw (164,000 cars per day in 2009); part of Trasa Toruńska („Toruń Route”),
- Gdańsk Bridge (1959) - 406 metres (1,332 ft) long, two-level (upper level for cars and buses, lower for trams),
- Śląsko-Dąbrowski Bridge (1949) - ca. 500 metres (1,640 ft) long,
- Świętokrzyski Bridge (2000) - 477 metres (1,565 ft) long, suspended on 48 steel cables and one pylon; the least frequented bridge in Warsaw (ca. 45,000 cars per day),
- Poniatowski Bridge (1913) – 506 metres (1,660 ft) long, additionally 700 metres (2,300 ft) of viaduct on the left bank,
- Łazienkowski Bridge (1974) – 424 metres (1,391 ft) long, part of the Łazienkowska Route (Trasa Łazienkowska),
- Siekierkowski Bridge (2002) – 500 metres (1,600 ft) long, suspended on 54 steel cables and two pylons; part of the Siekierkowska Route (Trasa Siekierkowska),
- Anna Jagiellon Bridge (2020) – 533 metres (1,749 ft) long, part of the Expressway S2.

There are two railway bridges in Warsaw:

- along the Gdański bridge – former Ring Railway Bridge (1875), serves mainly freight trains and some of the passenger trains,
- Średnicowy (1933) – serves mainly passenger trains.

== Cycling ==
The Veturilo scheme, launched 30 July 2012, aims to provide 5,300 bicycles for rental (2018). Bikes are available at a number of docking stations in central Warsaw. In 2015, the system was used by 375 thousand users: this compares poorly to other major European cities such as Berlin (5 per cent of all journeys are made by bikes), Munich (12 per cent), and Amsterdam (55 per cent) and Copenhagen (36 per cent).

In 2018, the total length of bicycle routes in Warsaw was 585 km, of which 432.5 km were bicycle routes, 74 km were pedestrian and bicycle routes, and 78.5 km were bicycle lanes.

== Air transport ==
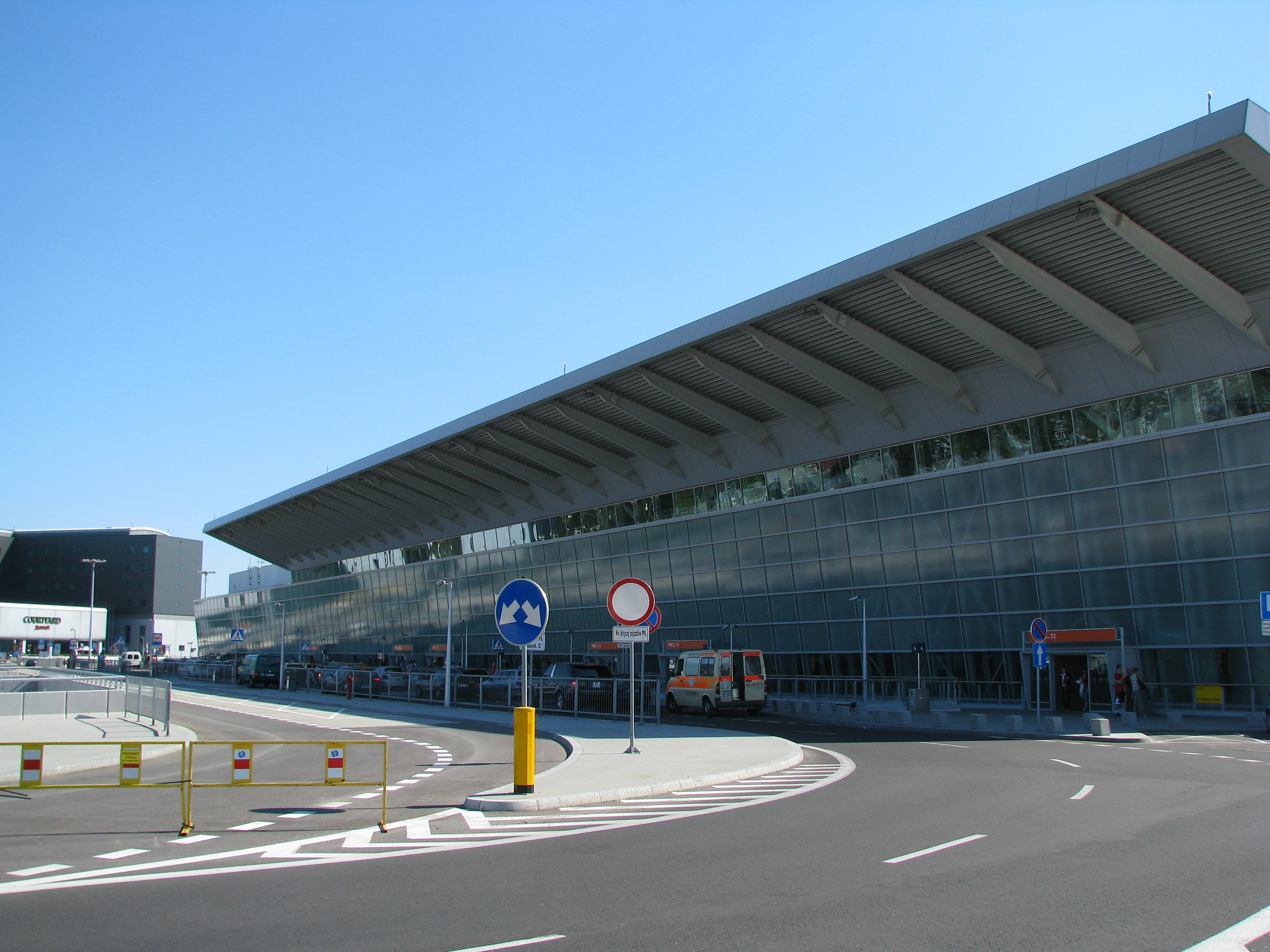
The façade of Terminal A's north hall.

Warsaw is served by two international airports: Warsaw Frederic Chopin Airport and Warsaw–Modlin Mazovia Airport. The above-mentioned airports served 21,926,557 passengers in 2018- 2019 in total.

=== Warsaw Frederic Chopin Airport ===
Warsaw Frederic Chopin Airport (usually referred to as Okęcie airport) is located just 10 kilometers (6.2 mi) from the city centre. With around 100 international and domestic flights a day and with over 11,206,700 passengers served in 2015, it is by far the biggest airport in Poland. A new Terminal 2 was opened in March 2008 in order to alleviate current overcrowding, and to extend the airport's capacity by another 6 million passengers. In 2010, the designation of terminals had changed and the entire former Terminal 1 and Terminal 2 complex is now designated as Terminal A divided into five check-in areas (A, B, C, D, E) in two main halls. The complex contains 45 passenger gates, 27 of which are equipped with jetways. A rail link has been added to connect the city with the airport in 2012.

=== Warsaw–Modlin Mazovia Airport ===
The disused military Modlin Airport, 35 kilometers (22 mi) north of the city centre, was converted into Warsaw's second airport, mainly for low-cost carriers. It was opened in June 2012, with the first scheduled flights in July. Warsaw–Modlin Mazovia Airport served 2,588,175 passengers in 2015.

There also are long-term plans to build an entirely new international airport. Its location has been decided to be Baranów and it is part of a wider CPK programme. This was first announced in 2017 and the expected completion dare is 2027.

== Municipal transport ==
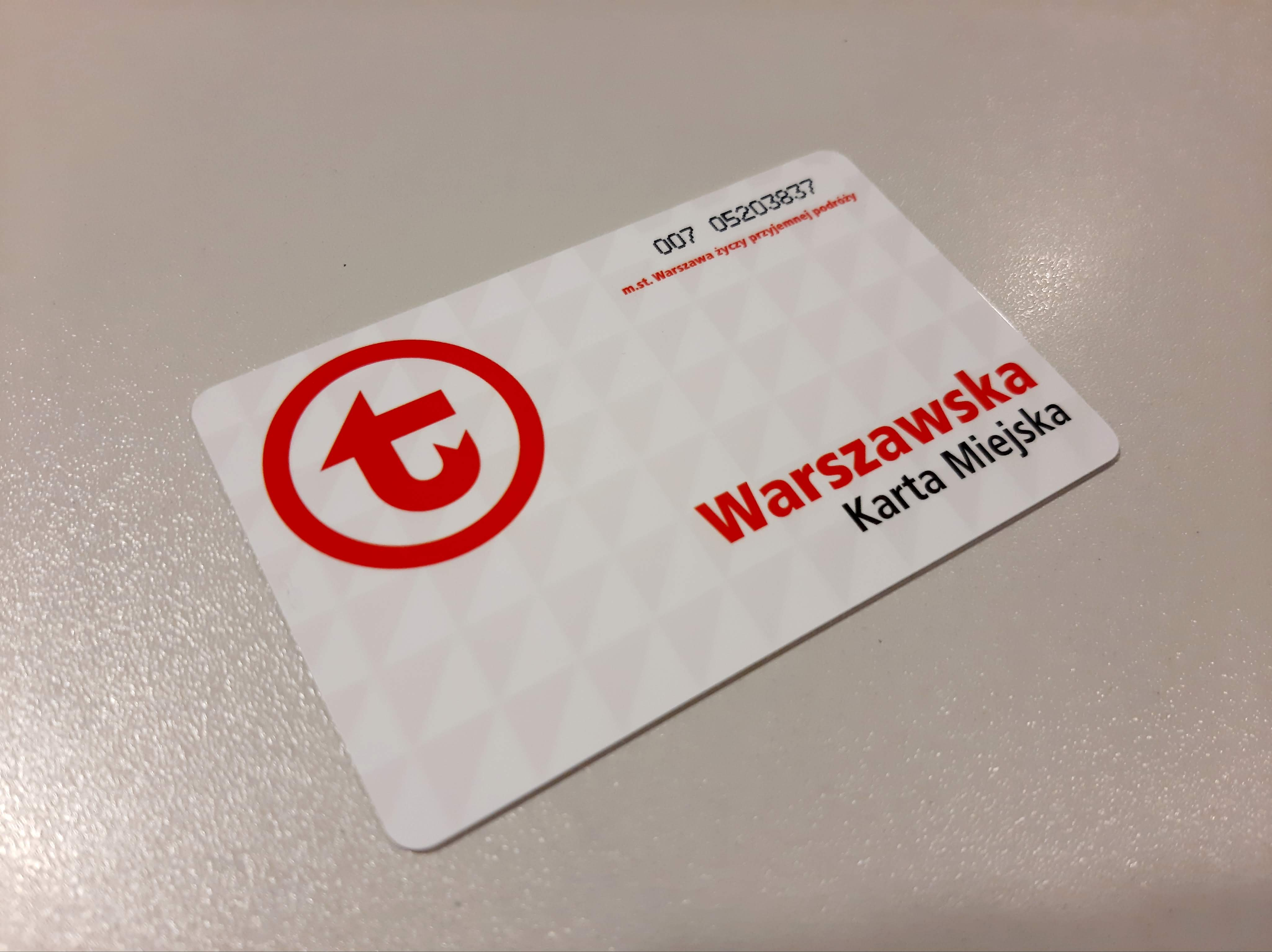
Warszawska Karta Miejska, city travel card

Public transport in Warsaw includes buses, trams (streetcars), Metro, light rail Warszawska Kolej Dojazdowa line, urban railway Rapid Urban Railway (Warsaw) and regional rail Masovian Railways (Mazovian Railroads). The buses, trams, urban railway and Metro are managed by the Public Transport Authority (ZTM). Masovian Railways and WKD are owned by Masovian Voivodeship. There are also some suburban bus lines run by private operators. Until 1994, the Warsaw Communication Company (Miejskie Zakłady Komunikacyjne, MZK) was responsible both for the technical service of vehicles (trams and buses) and for the organization of transport (tickets, timetables, routes). In 1992, the Public Transport Authority was established and became responsible for the organization of transport, while in 1994 the MZK was divided into Warsaw Trams (Tramwaje Warszawskie, TW) and Warsaw Bus Company (Miejskie Zakłady Autobusowe, MZA), responsible for technical maintenance of trams and buses, respectively.

ZTM tickets are valid on city and suburban bus lines, as well as trams, Metro, and SKM. Some ZTM tickets are also valid on the WKD and Mazovian Railroads, but only within the city or suburban zone. A given ticket costs the same price within one zone, but if a passenger passes the zone limit, it costs double. Tickets are best bought online, in ticket machines abroad and at various high traffic areas, and at newsagents. ZTM tickets are invalid on PKS suburban and intercity buses and private companies that do not operate within the ZTM scheme.

In Communist times, 90% of people living in Warsaw used to travel by public transport. In the 1990s, when the car became easily accessible and very popular, this number fell to 60%. To counteract this trend, the city’s authority purchased new vehicles, replacing the high-floor ones, many of which are over 30 years old.

There are three tourist routes: "T", a vintage tram running in July and August; bus "100" which runs on weekends and which operates the only double-decker bus owned by the city; and the "180" bus, a regular scheduled service that follows the "Royal Route" from the War Cemetery in the North, near the Old Town and down city's most prestigious thoroughfares – Krakowskie Przedmieście, Nowy Świat and Aleje Ujazdowskie – and terminating at Wilanów Palace.

=== Buses ===
Buses at the Ursynów Północny terminus

The Bus Traffic Department was sectioned off in the Tram Company in 1920. However, in the beginning, buses did not serve “common” people, but the soldiers fighting in the Polish-Soviet War – they were carrying them at the front. The first three routes were started one year later. Only one vehicle survived World War II.

The bus transport appeared again on the streets already in April 1945. In the beginning, it was appropriately adopted trucks, which gradually were being replaced by “real” buses (mainly sent as a gift from other European cities – especially, a lot of French Chaussons). In 1946, the first trolleybuses appeared on the streets, in 1951 - the first Hungarian Ikaruses 601, in 1963 – Polish Jelcz buses. These latter were manufactured in the factory placed in the city Jelcz, close to Wrocław. Because of the characteristic shape, the bus was called “cucumber” (Jelcz 272 MEX).

In the early 1960s, Warsaw suffered from the lack of bus drivers, therefore the MZK company tried to do an experiment. Using two Jelcz buses, destroyed in an accident, the engineers constructed one articulated bus. The tests finished positively, so the factory in Jelcz started to produce such buses – marked as Jelcz AP 02.

In 1973, the trolleybuses were canceled – it was the result of the same policy which was to lead to the cancellation of trams. In the same year, the factory in Jelcz bought the license from the French Berliet and started the production of Jelcz-Berliet, marked as Jelcz PR 100. The buses were pretty comfortable, but completely not adapted to the conditions and loadings in Warsaw (the number of passengers and the bad quality of road surfaces), hence they broke down very often, especially during severe winters. The ultimate decision about taking off the Berliets from the streets was taken by the MZK in 1977, although they ran yet a few years more.

Solaris Urbino 18 electric bus

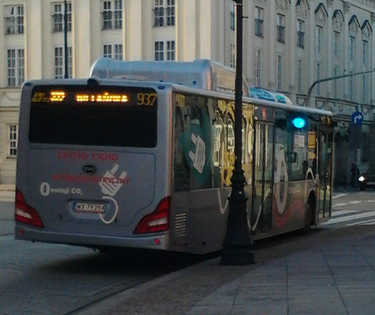
BYD electric bus near Kapitulna bus stop, 2014

In 1983, the MZK decided that only the Hungarian Ikaruses would run in Warsaw. The first type was an articulated Ikarus 280. The Ikaruses were very strong and capacious, more reliable than Berliets and the spare parts were much easier available. Mainly the models 280 and 260 ran in Warsaw, there were also 405, 411, 417 and 435. The last vehicles were imported in 1995.

In the years 1983-95, the trolleybus appeared again. It was only one route – 51, to Piaseczno; in 1990, a night route 651 appeared. The lines were canceled in 1995, whereas in 2000 – the whole trolleybus traction, what shattered the remains of hope for the comeback of trolleybuses.

In the years 1992-2009, the MZK purchased Jelcz buses again, but now – the newer versions; 2001-06 – the German MANs, 1994-99 – the German Neoplans. Since 1999, Warsaw has purchased the Polish buses Solaris, produced in Bolechowo near Poznań.

Bus service covers the entire city, with approximately 170 routes totalling about 2,603 kilometers (1,617 mi) in length. The technical service comes under the administration of MZA (Miejskie Zakłady Autobusowe, Warsaw Bus Company), but there are 5 other operators which run bus lines in Warsaw: Mobilis, Arriva, KM Łomianki, Europa Express City and the branch of PKS (Car Communication Enterprise) from Grodzisk Mazowiecki. Only the ZTM tickets are valid there. The timetable and routes both of the buses of the MZA and those of the private operators are regulated by ZTM.

Day lines run in Warsaw and in suburbs between 4 am and midnight, while between 11.15 pm and 5.45 am, the city and suburbs are served by night lines. The MZA has 5 depots. Including the buses of the private companies, some 1,700 vehicles run in Warsaw. All of them are low-floor buses.

MZA:

- Jelcz M121M – 132 vehicles
- MAN NG 313 – 173 vehicles
- Solaris Urbino 10 – 26 vehicles
- Solaris Urbino 12 – 156 vehicles
- Solaris Urbino 15 – 166 vehicles
- Solaris Urbino 18 – 433 vehicles
- Solbus SM12-10 – 20 vehicles

Mobilis:

- Solaris Urbino 8,9LE – 54 vehicles
- MAN A37 Lion's City Hybrid – 61 vehicles
- Mercedes Conecto G – 54 vehicles
- Solaris Urbino 18 – 54 vehicles

PKS Grodzisk Mazowiecki:

- MAN A75 Lion's City B100 – 5 vehicles
- Solaris Urbino 12 – 49 vehicles

Arriva:

- Solaris Urbino 12 – 49 vehicles
- Solaris Urbino 12 Hybrid – 5 vehiclese

Europa Express City:

- Autosan M09LE Sancity – 30 vehicles

KM Łomianki:

- Solaris Urbino 12 – 19 vehicles
- Jelcz M121M – 5 vehicles
- Ursus CitySmile 12 LF – 2 vehicles

=== Trams ===
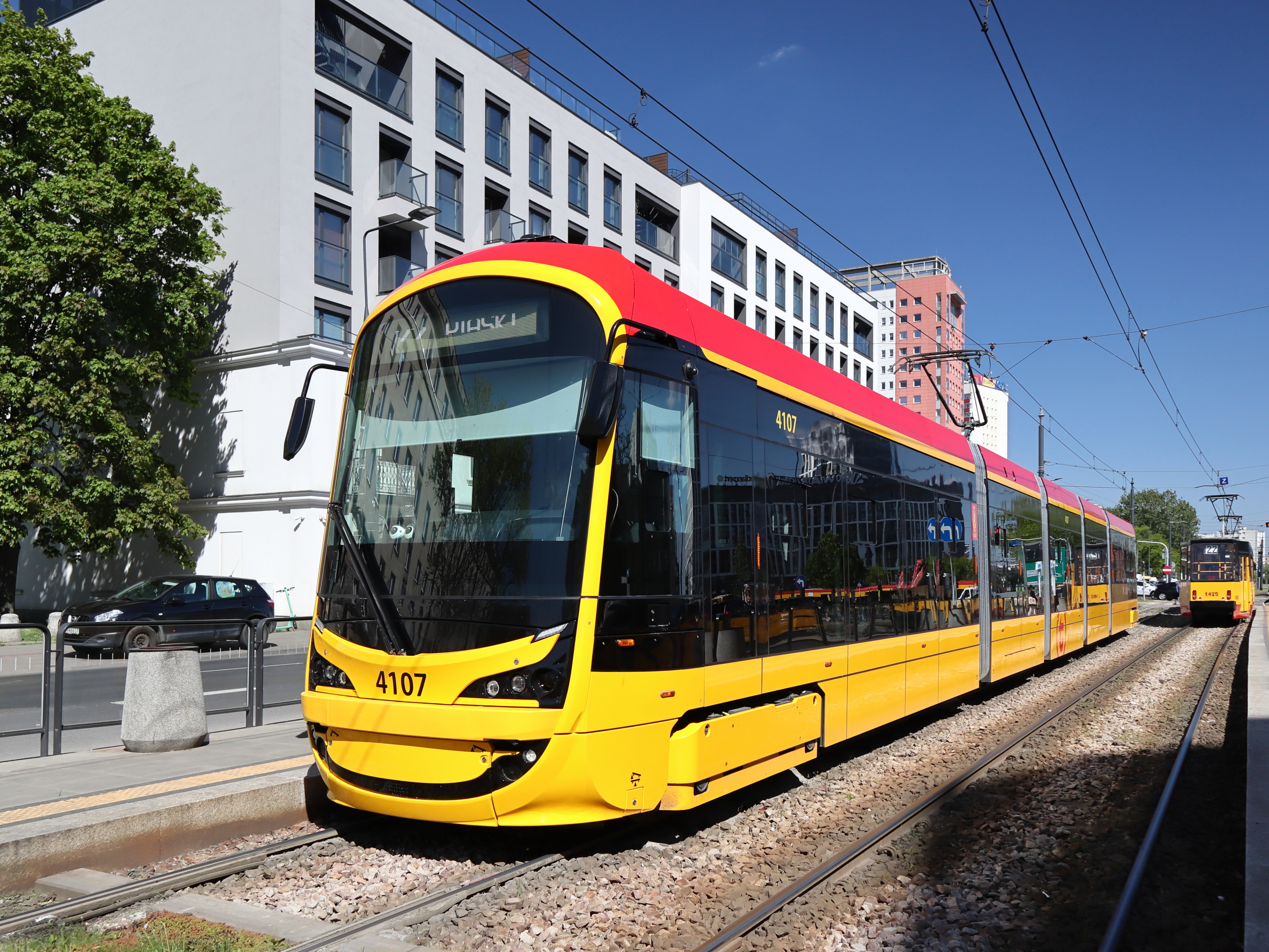
A Hyundai Rotem 141N tram in Warsaw

The first tram (horsecar) line in Warsaw was opened on 11 December 1866. The last horse-drawn tram ran on 26 March 1908, replaced by the electric one. In the period between the world wars, the tram network was extended significantly. After the German invasion of September 1939 the service was halted for approximately three months due to war damage, but the trams were back in service by 1940. In 1941, the present colors of the cars were introduced (yellow and red, in the colors of the Flag of Warsaw. Previously, trams were painted either white and red, or entirely red). During the war, in every vehicle was a compartment only for Germans („Nur für Deutsche”).

During the Warsaw Uprising, the tram system was destroyed. The first tram line was reopened on 20 June 1945. Following the Second World War, the tram network in Warsaw underwent fast development. The tracks reached all the principal parts of the city. However, in the 1960s, the official policy of both Polish and Soviet authorities promoted the use of Soviet oil; hence more buses were purchased and the tram network was shortened, whereas the trolleybuses – totally canceled.

Currently, the Tramwaje Warszawskie (Warsaw Trams) company runs about 865 cars on over 276 kilometers (171 mi) of tracks. There are four tram depots in Warsaw. The trams run generally between 4.30 a.m. and 11.30 p.m. Twenty-odd lines run across the city with additional lines opened on special occasions (such as All Saints' Day). The cars are of the following types:

- Konstal 13N – 53 cars, with high floor, produced 1959-69 in Chorzów according to the pattern of the Czech Tatra T1,
- Konstal 105Na – 298 cars, with high floor, produced 1979-92 in Chorzów,
- 123N – 30 cars, with high floor, produced since 2006 in Poznań,
- Konstal 112N – 1 car (prototype), with low floor, produced in 1995 in Chorzów,
- Konstal 116N – 29 cars, with low floor, produced 1998-2000 in Chorzów,
- Pesa 120N (since 2007) - totally 15 cars, with low floor, produced in Bydgoszcz.
- Pesa Swing (120Na) (since 2010) – totally 186 (6 bi-directional) cars, with low floor, produced in Bydgoszcz.
- Pesa Jazz Duo (128N) (since 2014) - totally 50 cars bi-directional, with low floor, produced in Bydgoszcz.
- Pesa 134N (since 2015) - totally 30 cars, with low floor, produced in Bydgoszcz.

Warsaw hosted the 2026 European Tramdriver Championship.

=== Rapid transit ===
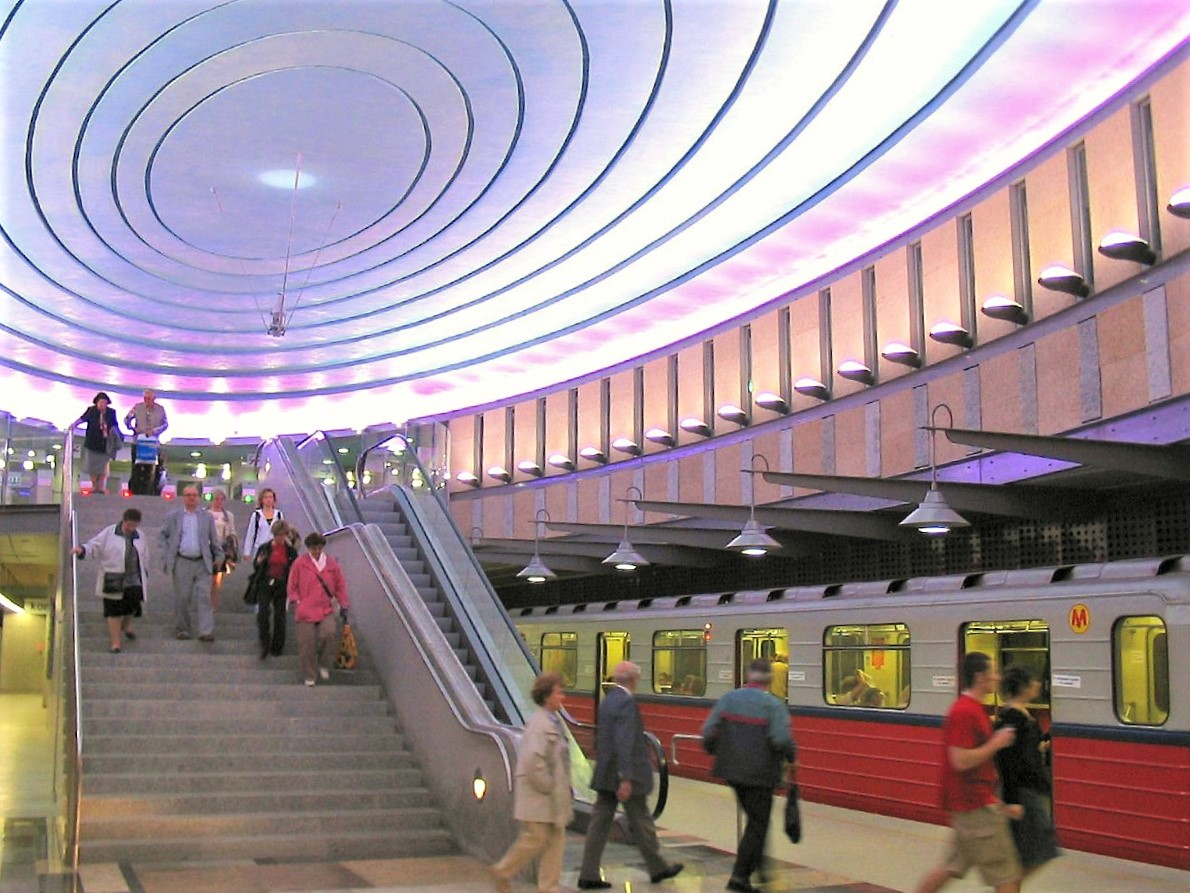
Plac Wilsona Metro station and the 81 Series train

Currently, Warsaw is the only Polish city to have introduced a public rapid transit system in the form of an underground metro. The metro is, along with most of Warsaw's public transport, managed by ZTM. The metro has two lines (M1 and M2) and a third line (M3) is planned.

Plans to build an underground rail system in Warsaw date as far back as 1925. There were two routes planned: east-west and north-south (that second on the left-right of the city). The Great Depression buried those plans as Poland and the world was gripped by hardship. The studies over the subway project were revived in 1938, but World War II brought an end to the ambitious undertaking. After the war, Joseph Stalin proposed help in building Metro, but Bolesław Bierut, the Communist leader from that time, preferred rather the Palace of Culture and Science – he said that “Warsaw does not need Metro” In 1951, there was a return to the old idea of a shallow Metro network. However, the planning phase proceeded at a very slow pace and economics prevented all successive communist governments from actually starting any serious work. In 1957, due to technical problems the authorities totally gave up the building and the state government even forbade to mention in mass-media about Metro.

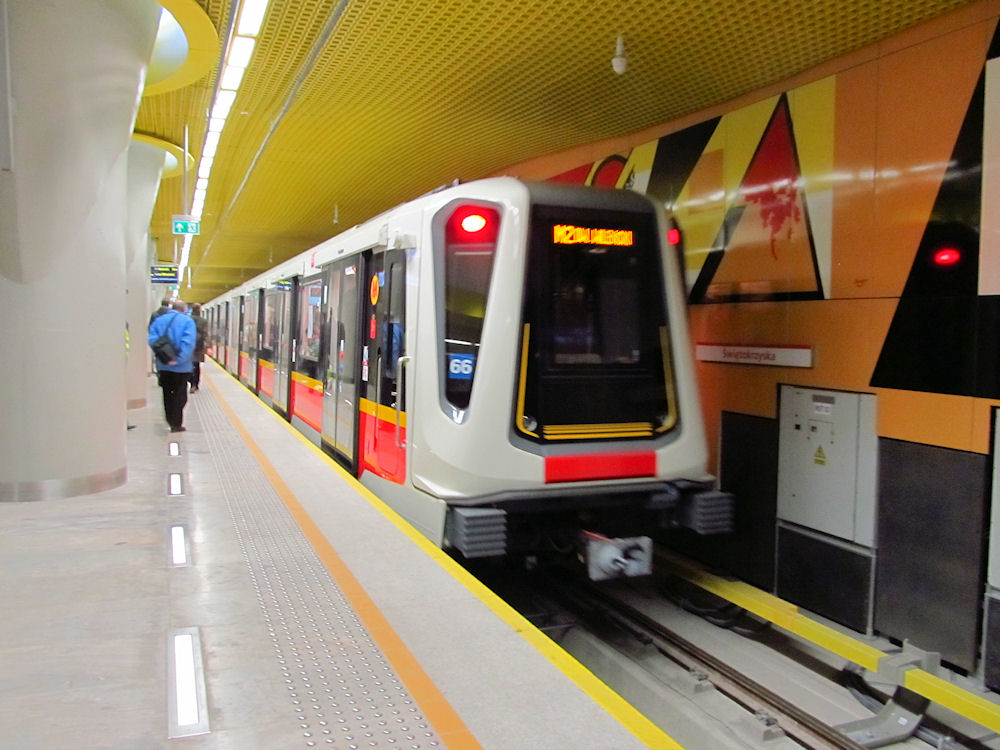
One of the 35 Siemens Inspiro trains used by the metro

Map of metro as of 28 January 2020

In 1974, there was once more a return to the idea of an underground rail system. Finally, in 1983, the idea to create the country's first metro was approved by the government and the first tunnels were built. Lack of funds, poor planning, and tedious bureaucracy meant that the work progressed very slowly, at a speed no greater than 2 meters a day. The first section of the Metro was opened in April 1995 with a total of 11 stations – from “Kabaty” to “Politechnika”. The first trains were produced in Russia (actually, yet in USSR) – cars of type 81, from Mytishchi, but in 2000, Warsaw purchased the cars from Alstom, produced in Barcelona, then in Chorzów. The line was gradually lengthened and the last station - Młociny in the north (by the ArcelorMittal Steel Mill) - was completed in October 2008. It has 21 stations along a distance of approximately 23 kilometers. Initially, all of the trains were Russian built. In 1998, 108 new carriages were ordered from Alstom.

A second line of the Warsaw Metro is being built – it will run east-west and will be about 31 kilometers long. It will run from Bemowo in the west to the east bank of the river, where it will split into two branches, one running north to Bródno, the other south-east to Gocław. The building of the central section of the second line began on 11 September 2010. The central section of this line was finished on 30 September 2014, and the 6-kilometer section was opened on 8 March 2015. 35 new trains were bought from Siemens for the second line.

The technical service of Metro is supervised by the Warsaw Metro LLC (Metro Warszawskie sp. z.o.o.).

The trains used are of the following types:

- MWM 81 Series – Russian, from Saint Petersburg and Mytishchi, 90 older cars (purchased in 1990, 1994 and 1997) as well as 42 newer (purchased in 2007 and 2008), These lines are still in operation today but run only on the older M1 line.
- Metropolis – French, from Alstom, 24 cars from Barcelona (purchased in 2000) and 84 cars from Chorzów (purchased in 2001-2005). These trains run on the M1 line
- 35 Siemens Inspiro trains were purchased from 2012 to 2014 and currently run on both lines (M1 and M2).
- Varsovia – Czech, from Škoda Transportation, 24 cars from Plzeň which were purchased in 2022. Currently this type of train runs on both lines.

Until 2000, Metro entrances were not gated and the paid zone was marked by a line painted on the floor. Since October 2000, turnstiles have been installed at the entrances to every station; entry is possible when riders insert a ZTM ticket or scan a Warsaw City Card.

== Rail ==
=== Rapid Urban Railway ===
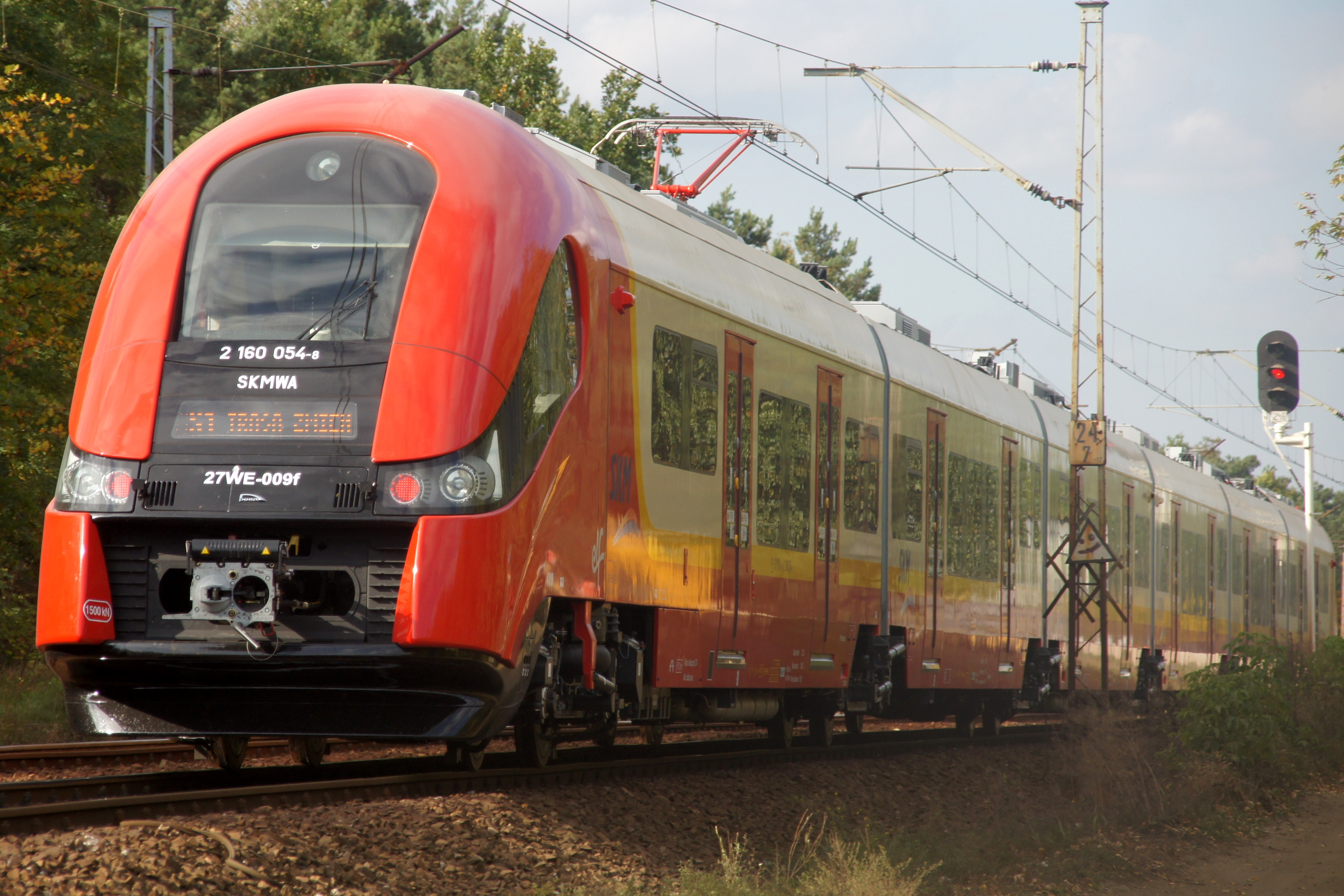
Pesa Elf I 27WE pf the Rapid Urban Railway

The beginning of the Rapid Urban Railway was the line Pruszków-Warsaw-Otwock, opened in 1936. After World War II, the Polish railroads could not make an agreement with the city transport authority about involving the railway in the Warsaw system of communication (the railroad representatives told that the railway is not a tram). Only in 2002, the negotiations restarted and in October 2005, arrived the first train on the route Warsaw West – Warsaw Falenica. However, due to low popularity (which, on the other hand, was the result of badly written timetable and low frequency of runs), the route was changed to Warsaw West – Warsaw Rembertów.

Nowadays, there are 4 routes of SKM in Warsaw:

- S1 – Pruszków-Warsaw-Otwock – opened temporarily in June 2010 after the road heading to Otwock had been flooded; since September 2010, however, due to high popularity, the route has remained as permanent;
- S2 – Warsaw Chopin Airport-Warsaw-Sulejówek Miłosna – extended first route (Warsaw West – Warsaw Rembertów);
- S3 – Warsaw Chopin Airport-Radzymin - opened in June 2012;
- S9 – Warsaw West (Platform 9)-Legionowo-Wieliszew (close to the Zegrze Lake) – opened in March 2010, currently is postponed due to modernisation of Warsaw West station;
- S4 - Zegrze Południowe-Piaseczno – opened in March 2022 with its shorter variant - S40 (Warsaw Main Station - Piaseczno).

On the SKM, only the electric multiple units run. They are of the following types:

- 14WE – 2 units, produced in 2005-07 in Nowy Sącz (currently both units run replacement services in case a train breaks down);
- 19WE – 4 units, produced in 2008 in Nowy Sącz (the newer version of the 14WE type);
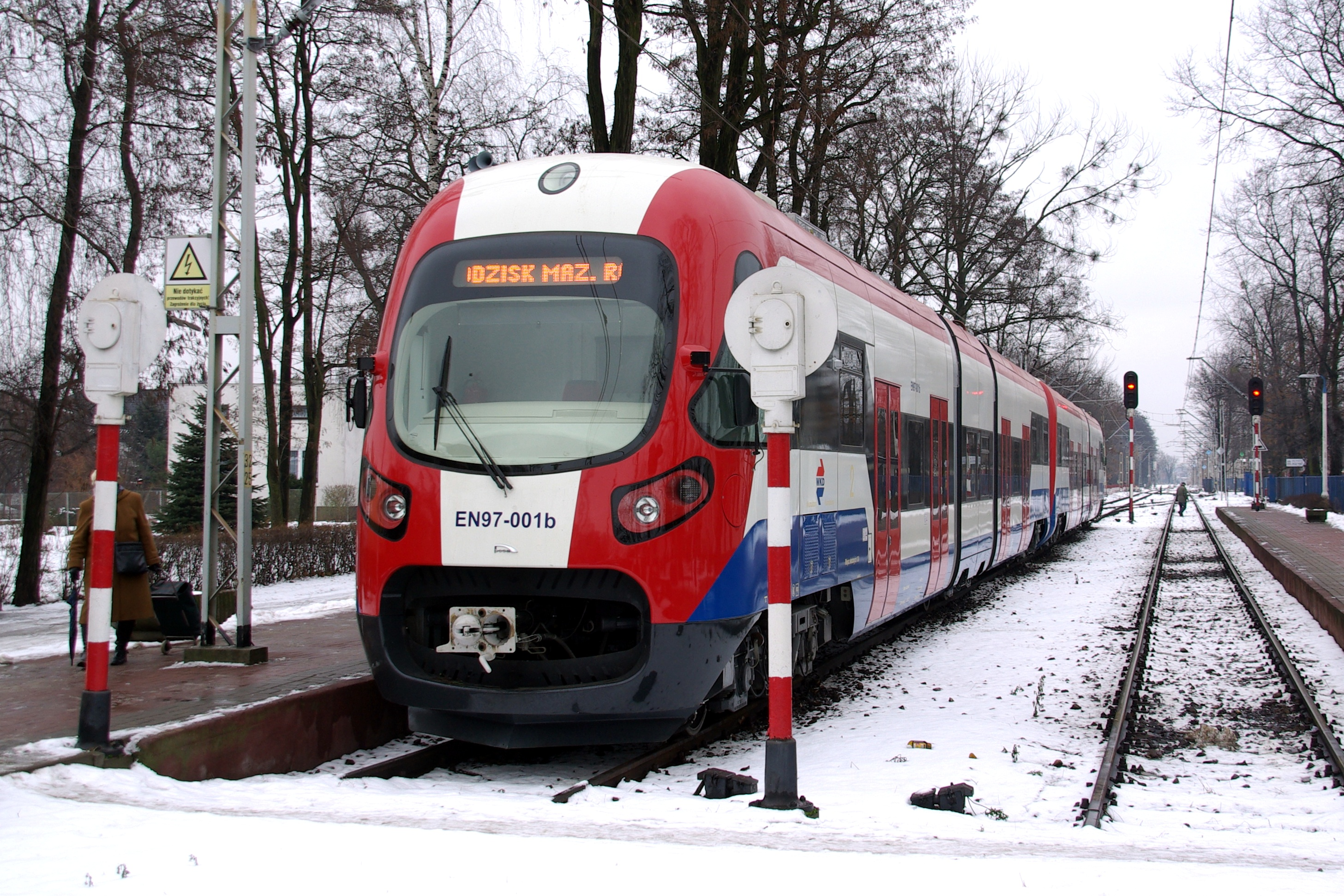
  Class EN97 of the Warsaw Commuter Railway
- 27WE – 13 units, produced in 2011 in Bydgoszcz;
- 35WE – 9 units, produced in 2012-2013 in Nowy Sącz;
- 31WEba – 6 units, produced in 2022 in Nowy Sącz;
- 45WEa – 13 units, produced since 2022 in Nowy Sącz.

=== WKD ===
Warsaw Commuter Railway, Polish: Warszawska Kolej Dojazdowa (WKD), is a suburban light rail line in Poland's capital city of Warsaw. The line, together with its two branches, links Warsaw with the municipalities of Michałowice, Pruszków, Brwinów, Podkowa Leśna, Milanówek and Grodzisk Mazowiecki to the south-west of Warsaw.

On the mainline, trains operate every 15 minutes at peak periods and every 30 minutes at other times, with a service gap between midnight and 05:00. For most of the day, one train an hour runs through to Milanówek Grudów, with most of the other trains running through to Grodzisk Mazowiecki Radońska. All trains stop at all stations on their route, and a journey from Warsaw Śródmieście WKD station, not to be confused with Warszawa Śródmieście PKP station, to Grodzisk Mazowiecki Radońska takes just under one hour.

== Inter-city rail ==
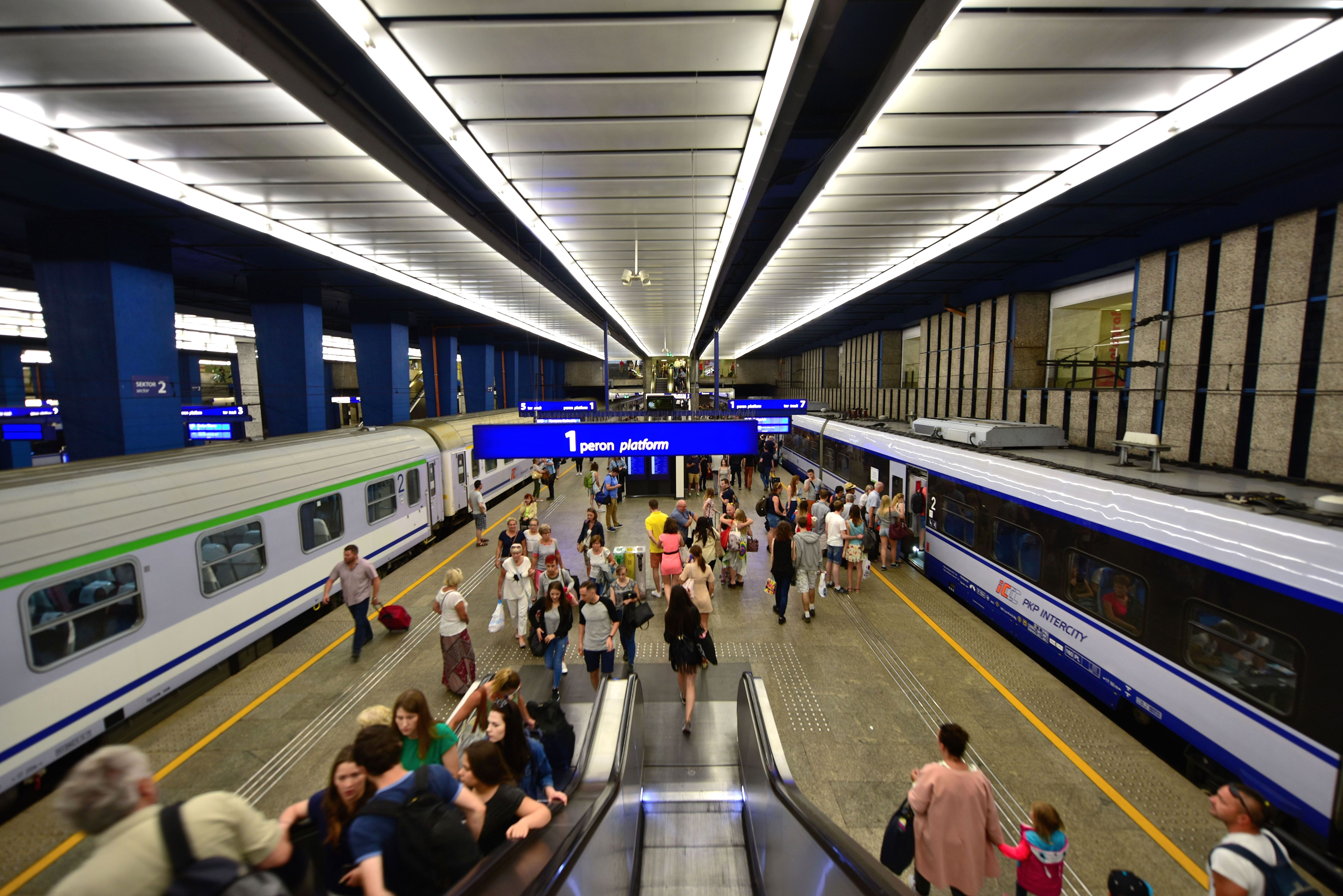
Warszawa Centralna Station

Currently, Warsaw is one of the main railway hubs in Poland. The main railway station is Warszawa Centralna, serving domestic traffic to almost every major city in Poland and international connections, mainly to Germany, the Czech Republic and former Soviet Union countries.

There are also five other major railway stations and a number of smaller suburban stations. These five major stations are:

- Warszawa Wschodnia (English: Warsaw East Station) – built on the place of the former Terespol Station, serves fast trains, SKM and Masovian Railways trains
- Warszawa Zachodnia (English: Warsaw West Station) – serves fast trains, SKM and Masovian Railways trains
- Warszawa Wileńska (English: Warsaw Vilnius Station) – former Saint-Petersburg Station, serves only Masovian Railways trains
- Warszawa Gdańska (English: Warsaw Gdańsk Station) – former Vistula Station (Dworzec Nadwiślański), serves SKM and Masovian Railways trains
- Warszawa Śródmieście – near the Warszawa Centralna, serves only SKM and Masovian Railways trains.

The two intercity carriers maintaining connections to Warsaw are PKP Intercity (with Intercity, Eurocity, TLK trains) and Przewozy Regionalne (Regional Transfers) with RegioExpress, InterREGIO, and Regio trains). They both come from divided Polish State Railways.

The Masovian Railways, KM (Mazovian Railroads) is the local carrier that was divided from former Polish State Railways (PKP, Polskie Koleje Państwowe) which serves the area of Mazovian Voivodeship. Its trains are mostly suburban and middle distant. KM operate EN57 class electric multiple units, mainly modernized to EN57AKM standard (modern interiors, drive inverters based on HV IGBTs, and so on), and modern EMU's like PESA ELF and Stadler FLIRT, which both are limited to 160 km/h. Besides, they operate double deck push-pulls with 4th generation Bombardier cars and TRAXX locomotives. The only long distant (but only seasonal) KM train Słoneczny (Sunny) to the Tricity often uses this type. Some DMUs are also used by KM on the least intensity lines in the eastern part of the voivodeship.

Tickets of Polish rail carriers (PKP IC, PR, KM, KD, DB Schenker, SKM Tricity, SKM Warsaw) are not interchangeable.

=== History ===
In chronological terms, the key railway investments concerning Warsaw are the Warsaw-Vienna Railway, the Warsaw-Petersburg Railroad, the Warsaw-Terespol Railroad, the Nadwiślańska Railroad, the Warsaw–Kalisz Railroad, the Citadel Rail Bridge, the Warsaw Commuter Rail, the Warsaw Cross-City Line (with a bridge) and the Warsaw-Radom line. The history of railways in Warsaw and its surroundings is presented, among others, by the Museum Station, located in the former Warszawa Główna station.

Historical commuter railways: Jablonowska Railway, Wilanowska Railway, Grójecka Railway, Electric Commuter Rail, Młocińska Railway. Preserved historical objects: the Building of the State Railway Directorate in Praga, Terespol Railway Station (fragment), Warszawa Wilanów, and the railway viaduct at Armatna Street.

== Inter-city bus ==
Warsaw has a lot of bus connections with suburban towns and major cities in Poland and abroad. They are run by PKS (Car Communication Enterprise) and some private operators. The Warsaw branch of PKS has two bus terminals in Warsaw: the Central Bus Terminal by Warszawa Zachodnia railway station and the Stadion Terminal near the National Stadium in Praga. There are also two terminals which serve only the suburban connections: by the Gdańska Station (the region of Kampinos Forest as well as the powiats of Legionowo and Nowy Dwór Mazowiecki) and by the Wilanowska Metro station (the powiat of Piaseczno and Grójec). Private buses and MZA commuter buses run to other towns and villages.
