= Beaches of Warsaw =

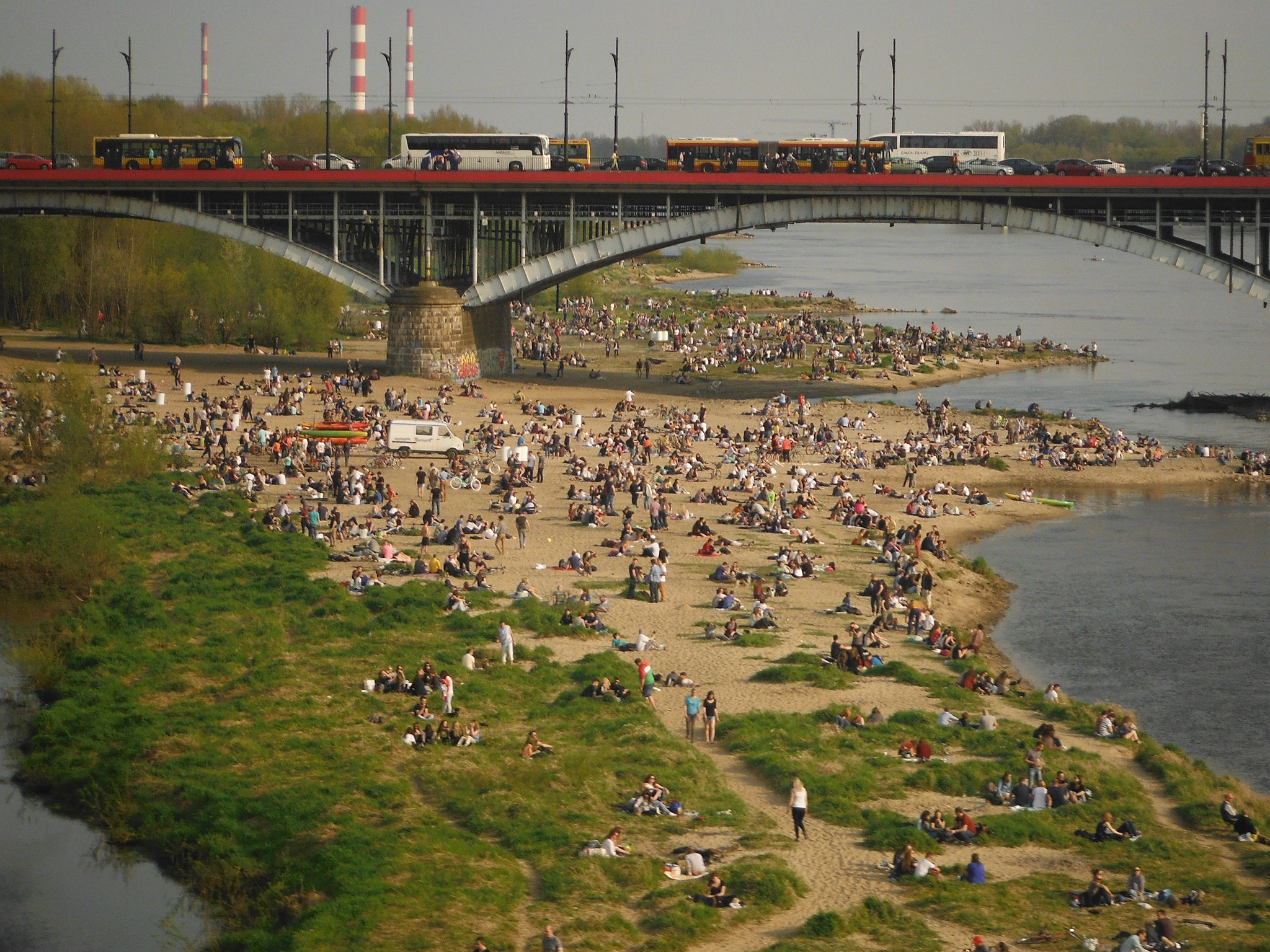
Beach by Poniatowski Bridge.

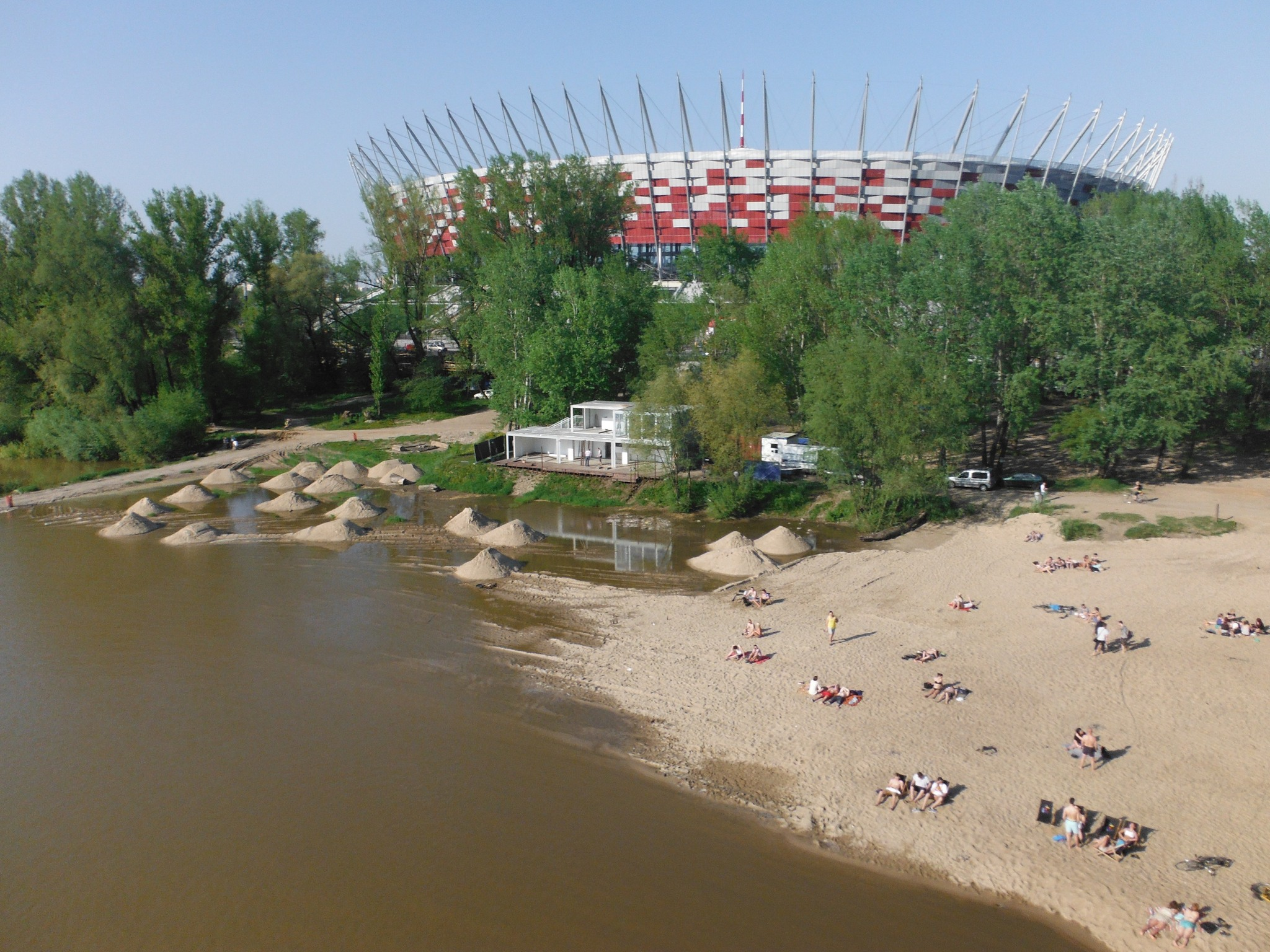
Beach by Poniatowski Bridge.

Beaches in Warsaw – recreational areas outlined for sunbathing in Warsaw, Masovian Voivodeship; in Poland.

The Beaches in Warsaw began to be popular with sunbathing during the Interwar period of the 20th century. In around the Miedzeszyński Embankment (Wał Miedzeszyński) functioned a popular beach area, this included the Beach of the Kozłowski Brothers (Plaża Braci Kozłowskich) and the Poniatówka urban beach – both of which had wooden pavilions and changing rooms. The modern functional beaches in Warsaw were featured in National Geographic's Top Urban Beaches in the World.

The modern twenty first century functioning beaches in Warsaw are (from north to south):

- Białołęka Beach (plaża na Białołęce) in the vicinity of the Maria Skłodowska-Curie Bridge.
- Żoliborz Beach (plaża na Żoliborzu) in the vicinity of the Olympic Centre (Centrum Olimpijskie).
- Beach by the music club La Playa by the Wybrzeże Helskie, connected by a ferry crossing to Podzamcze.
- Stadium Beach (plaża Stadion) in the vicinity of the National Stadium, connected by a ferry with the Wybrzeże Kościuszkowskie, with a built pavilion located by the beach built by the City of Warsaw.
- Beach by the Kryniczna Street (plaża przy ul. Krynicznej) located close by the Łazienkowska Thoroughfare, the beach functions for over 70–80 years in the same place. The beach is connected by a ferry crossing with the Cypel Czerniakowski.
- Wilanów Beach (plaża Wilanów) is located by the Aleja Wilanowska.

In 2014, due to the increasing popularity of urban beaches the City of Warsaw launched a night tram line from the Poniatowski Bridge.
