= Siekierki =

Neighbourhood in Warsaw, Poland

- City Information System area (neighbourhood)
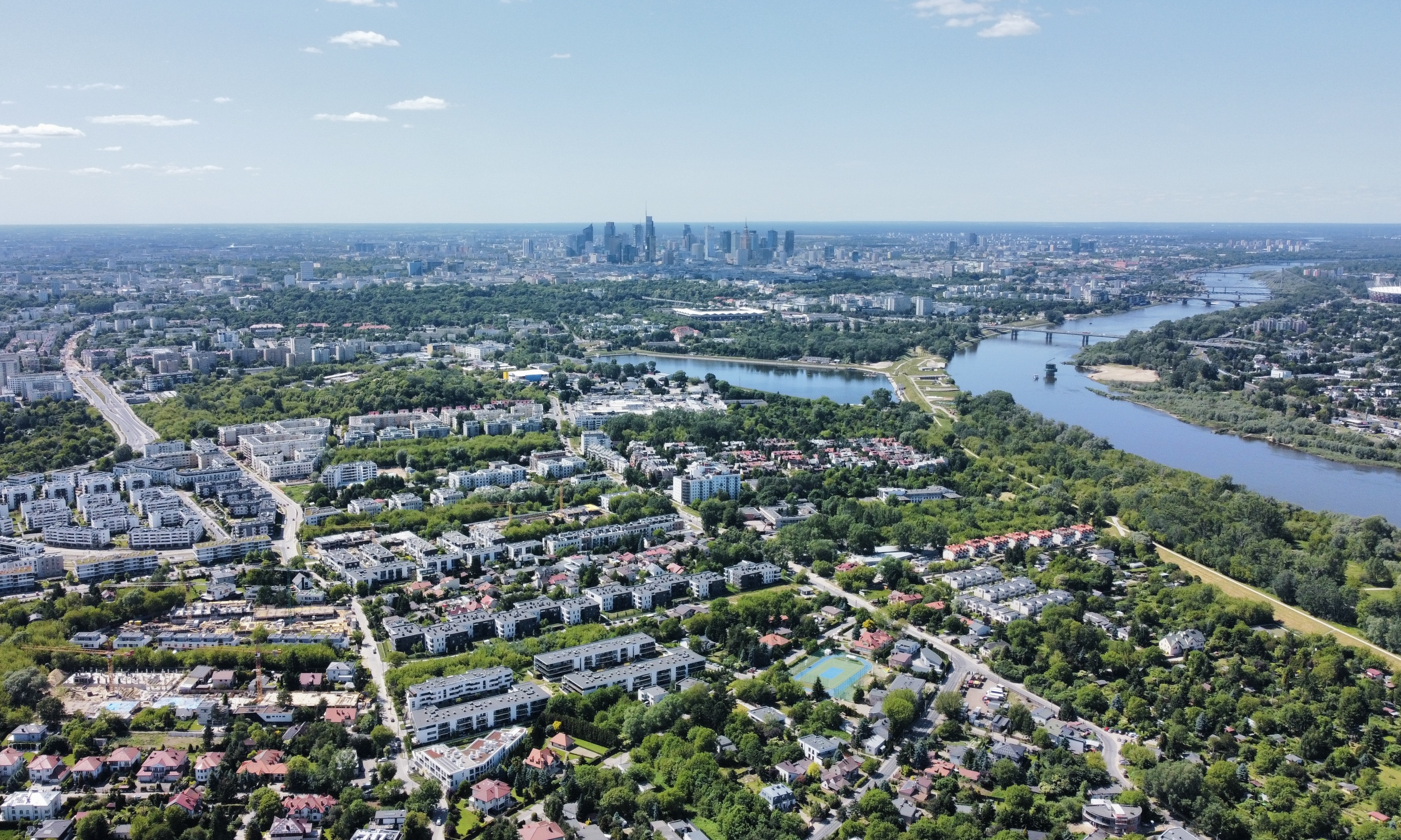
- Aerial view of Siekierki in 2023.

- The location of the City Information System area of Siekierki within the Mokotów district.
- Coordinates: 52°12′29″N 21°05′00″E
- Country: Poland
- Voivodeship: Masovian
- City and county: Warsaw
- District: Mokotów
- Subdistrict: Lower Mokotów
- Administrative neighbourhood: Siekierki
- Time zone: UTC+1 (CET)
  - Summer (DST): UTC+2 (CEST)
- Area code: +48 22

Siekierki (Polish: [ɕɛˈkʲɛr.kʲi]) is a neighbourhood and a City Information System area in Warsaw, Poland, within the Mokotów district. It is a residential neighbourhood with low-rise single family houses and mid-rise apartment buildings. The neighbourhood features the Space Research Centre of Polish Academy of Sciences, and the Sanctuary of Our Lady the Teacher of the Youth.

The village of Czarnów, was the oldest known human settlement in the area, dating to the 13th century. The village of Siekierki was recorded in its place in the 16th century. The area was incorporated into the city in the 1916. Most of the houses in the neighbourhood were destroyed in 1944 during the Warsaw Uprising, and were rebuilt afterwards. Beginning in 2010s, the housing estates have been developing.

== History ==
The earliest known settlement in the present-day area of Siekierki was the village of Czarnów (also known as Czarnowo), with its records dating to the 13th century, situated along the Wilanówka river, which flew into the Vistula. Later, in its place emerged the village of Siekierki, originally known as Kępa Bełt, recorded in the documents since the 16th century. In the 17th century, Stanisław Herakliusz Lubomirski acquired the settlement and established a recreational pavilion there. In the 18th century, the surrounding area was leased to king Augustus II the Strong, the monarch of the Polish–Lithuanian Commonwealth, as a hunting ground. In the 19th century, area included two settlements, known as Siekierki Wielkie and Siekierki Małe (Polish for Greater Siekierki and Lesser Siekierki). In 1827, combined, they had 194 residents in 30 households, and in 1889, they had 358 inhabitants. They were an integral part of a local manor's agricultural estate, which in 1884 covered an area of 556 New Polish morgen (320 ha), mostly consisting of meadows and pastures.

On 13 January 1867, the area including Siekierki Wielkie and Siekierki Małe became part of the rural municipality of Mokotów, established as part of the administrative reform in the Kingdom of Poland. The municipality was incorporated into the city of Warsaw on 8 April 1916. In 1909, it was transferred to the municipality of Wilanów. Szopy Niemieckie and Szopy Polskie were incorporated into the city of Warsaw on 8 April 1916.

In 1926, a levee along the left bank of the Vistula was completed, mitigating the previously threatening flood hazard and facilitating further development. During the interwar period, the Olympic District in the area was planned to be constructed in the area. It would include an Olympic sports complex covering approximately 160 ha, and feature amenities such as a stadium and a rowing course. The project was never realised due to the outbreak of the Second World War in 1939.

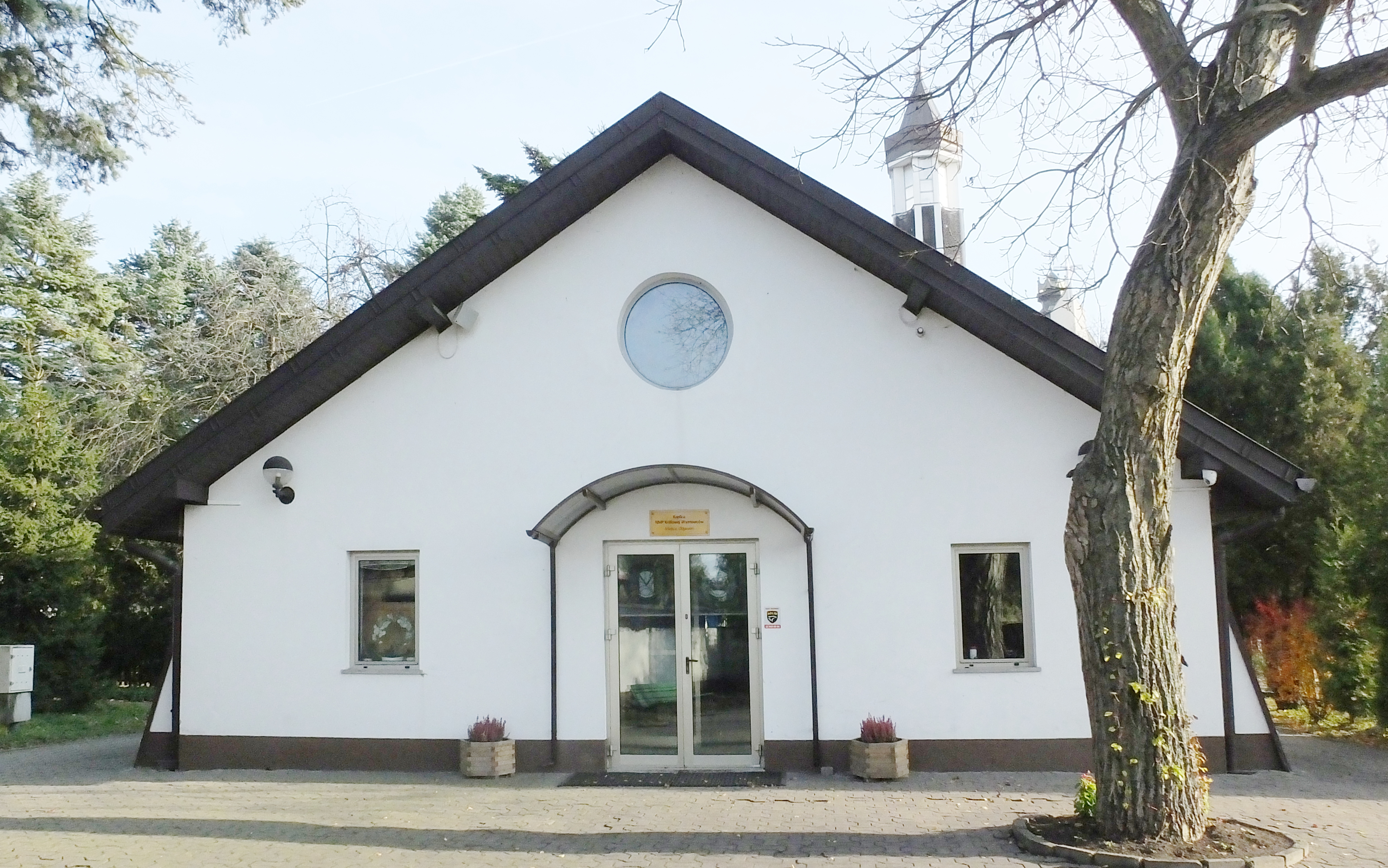
The chapel built in 1949, in place of supposed revelations of Virgin Mary and Jesus.

Between 1943 and 1949, local girl Władysława Papis claimed to have experienced a private revelation in form of repeated apparitions of Virgin Mary, Jesus Christ, and other religious symbols, giving rise to a local Marian worship. In 1946, a small chapel was built at 3 Gwintowa Street, in place of the supposed revelation. In 1994, the Sanctuary of Our Lady the Teacher of the Youth was opened next to it, managed by the Piarist order.

In 1944, during the Warsaw Uprising, while the city remained under the German occupation, the German officers carried out mass executions on Polish population in the area, and conducted arsonist attacks, resulting in the majority of buildings being destroyed, including the local manor house.

Between 17 and 19 September 1944, units of the First Polish Army conducted the reconnaissance and diversion activities in the area of Siekierki.

After the war, any new development in the area was prohibited under the Bierut Decree, which contributed significantly to the growth of unauthorised construction in the area. In 1961 the Siekierki Cogeneration Plant, the largest combined heat and power plant in Poland, was built in the vicinity if the neighbourhood. Currently, it is located within the City Information System area of Augustówka. The government planned to develop a science park in Siekierki and Augustówka by constructing a complex of research facilities along with corresponding housing developments. However, the increasing economic crisis halted the project, with the Space Research Centre of Polish Academy of Sciences, completed in 1978, being its only facility.

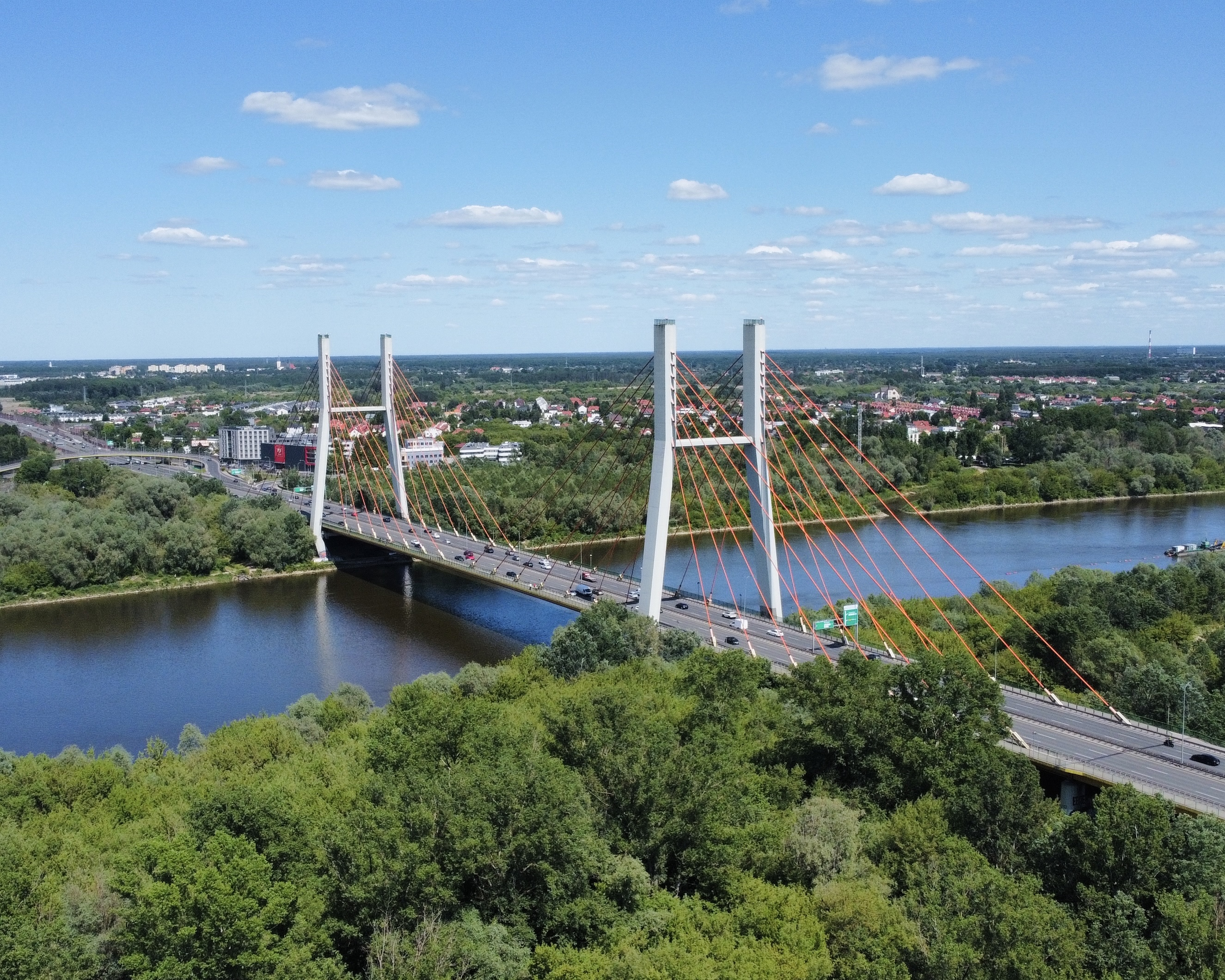
The Siekierki Bridge, opened in 2002.

On 4 October 1996, the Mokotów district was subdivided into twelve City Information System areas, with Siekierki becoming one of them.

In 2002, the Siekieri Route, an important arterial road connecting the west and east banks of the Vistula river, was opened alongside the southern boundary of the neighborhood, including Bem Avenue, and the Siekierki Bridge on the Vistula river. In 2004, the land adjacent to the river was designated as a conservation area under the Natura 2000 program. Between 2005 and 2008, it was planned to develop a technology and science park in Siekierk, codenamed the Warsaw Technology Park, however, the project was abandoned. In the early 2010s, the new residential housing estates of apartment buildings began developing in the neighbourhood. In 2019, the arterial road known as Polski Walczącej Avenue was opened in the neighbourhood, connecting Siekierki Route and Czerniakowska Street.

In 2016, the administrative neighbourhood of Siekierki was founded within the area, being governed by a locally elected council.

== Characteristics ==
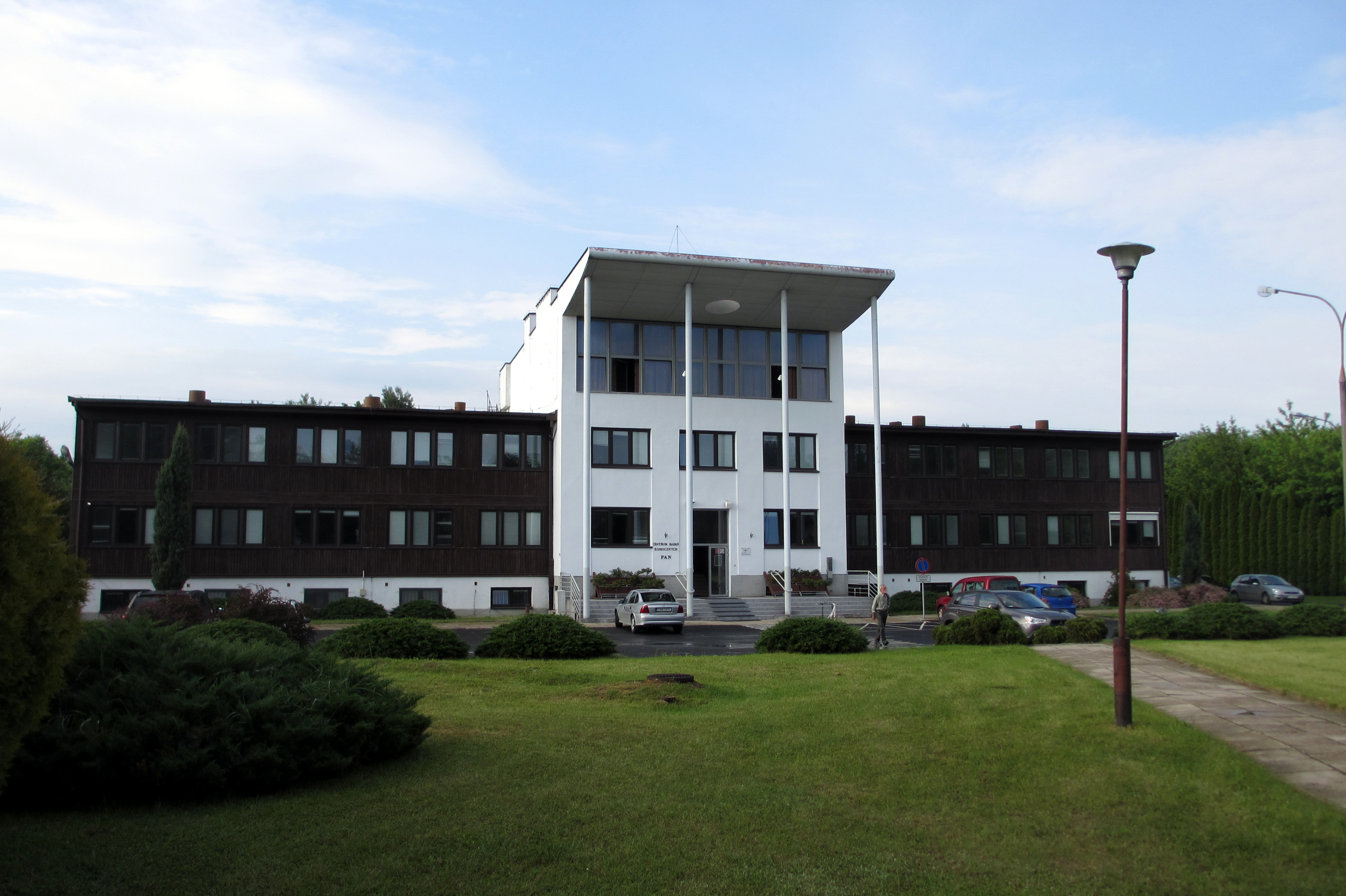
The Space Research Centre of Polish Academy of Sciences in Siekierki.

Siekierki is a residential area with low-rise single-family houses in the east, and high-rise apartment housing estates in the west. The neighbourhood features the Space Research Centre of Polish Academy of Sciences at 18A Bartycka Street, an interdisciplinary research institute dedicated to the study of terrestrial space and the Solar System using space technology. Siekierki also includes the Sanctuary of Our Lady the Teacher of the Youth, managed by the Piarist order, located at 3 Gwintowa Street. It was built in place, where Władysława Papis have claimed to have experienced a private revelation in form of repeated apparitions of Virgin Mary, Jesus, and other religious symbols, between 1943 and 1949.

The neighbourhood is placed on the coast of the Vistula river, which crosses the city. The land directly adjusted to it has a status of a conservation area.

The Siekieri Route, an important arterial road connecting the west and east banks of the Vistula river, runs alongside the southern boundary of the neighborhood, including Bem Avenue, and the Siekierki Bridge, which crosses the river.
