= Siekierki Bridge =

Cable-stayed bridge in Warsaw, Poland

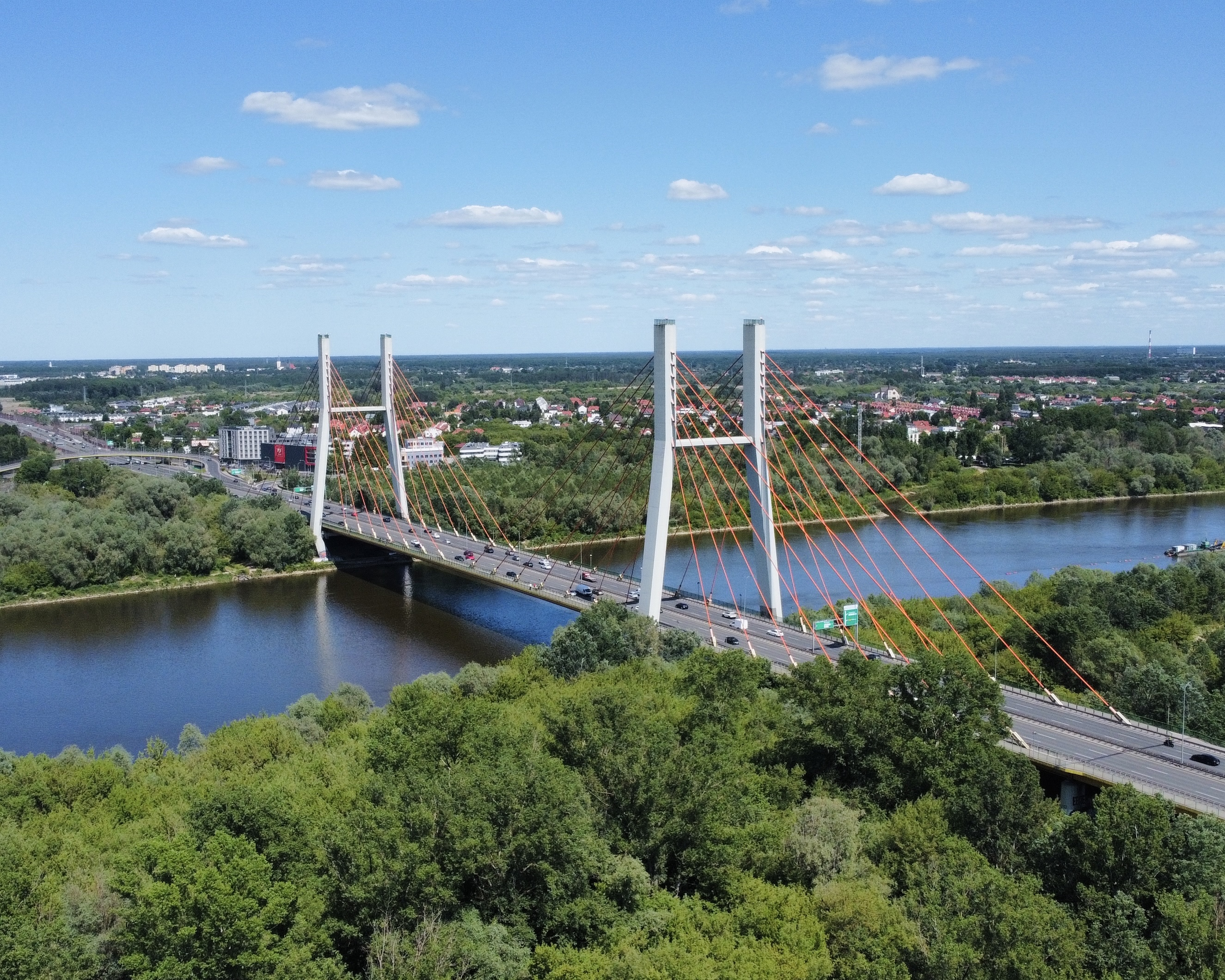
- Coordinates: 52°12′53″N 21°05′36″E
- Crosses: Vistula
- Locale: Warsaw. Poland
- Official name: Most Siekierkowski
- Preceded by: Anna Jagiellon Bridge
- Followed by: Łazienki Bridge

Characteristics
- Design: Cable-stayed bridge
- Total length: 500 m (1,600 ft)
- Width: 33 m (108 ft)
- Height: 87 m (285 ft)

History
- Construction start: 2000
- Construction end: 2002
- Opened: September 21, 2002

Statistics
- Toll: Free

Location
- Interactive map of Siekierki Bridge

Siekierki Bridge (Polish: Most Siekierkowski, Polish pronunciation: [ɕɛ̇cɛrˈkɔvski]) is a cable-stayed bridge over the Vistula river in Warsaw. Poland, connecting its Mokotów, Praga Południe and Wawer districts (Siekierki, Augustówka, Gocław and Las neighborhoods), belonging to a wider expressway route, i.e. Siekierki Way. The bridge is 500 m (1,600 ft) long and 33.38 m (110 ft) wide, with three lanes for vehicles, a pavement and a cycle path each way. The structure is supported by two H-pylons, each 87.07 m (286 ft) high.

The bridge, named after the nearby neighborhood of Siekierki, located on its Western side, was opened for use on September 21, 2002. Until the completion of Anna Jagiellon Bridge in 2020 it had remained Warsaw's southernmost bridge.

== See also ==
- Siekierki
- Łazienkowski Bridge
- Poniatowski Bridge
- Świętokrzyski Bridge
