= Anna Jagiellon Bridge =

Coordinates: 52°09′41″N 21°08′38″E

Anna Jagiellon Bridge Most Anny Jagiellonki
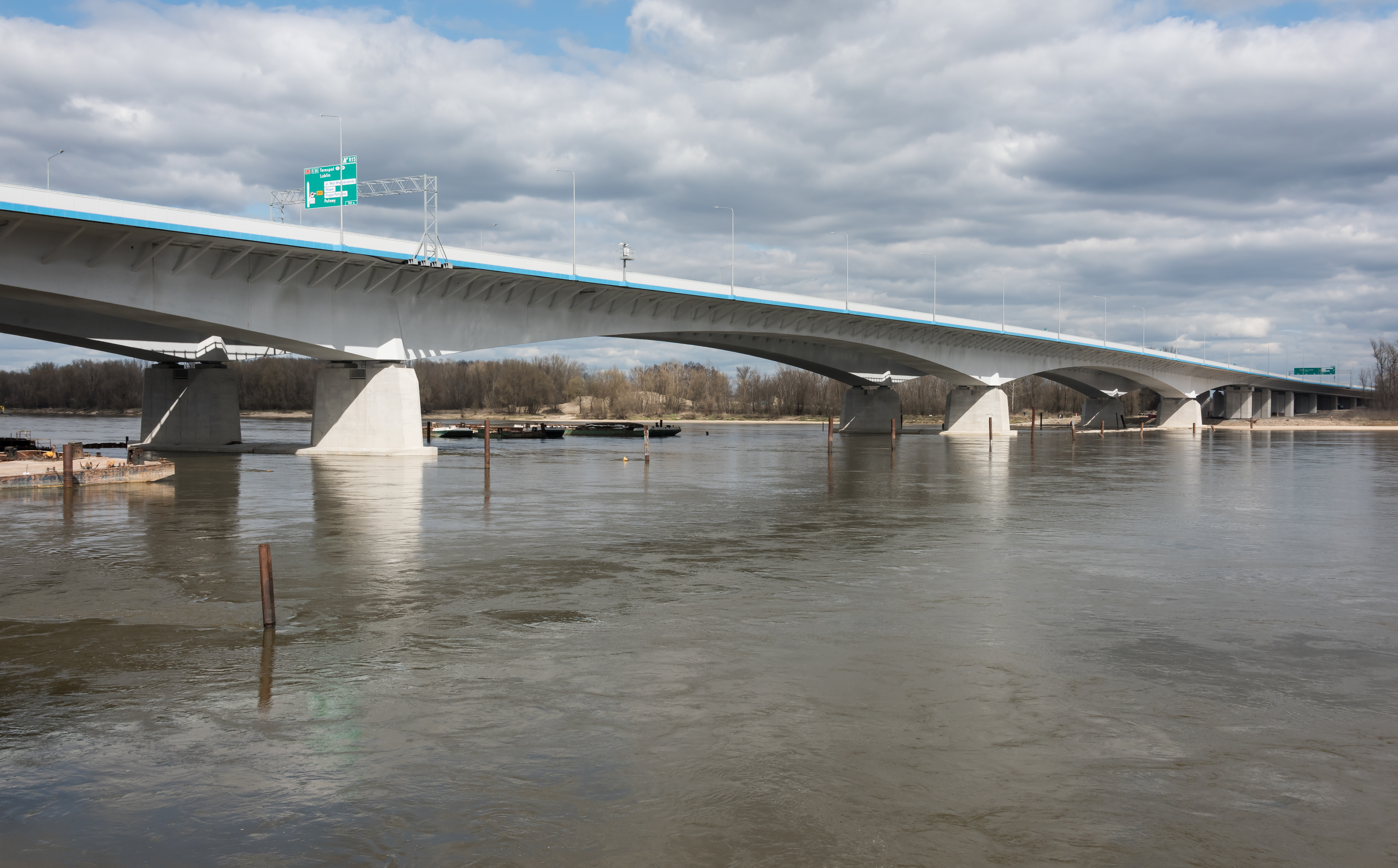
- The Anna Jagiellon Bridge
- Carries: motor vehicles, cyclists, pedestrians
- Crosses: Vistula River
- Locale: Warsaw, Poland
- Followed by: Siekierki Bridge

Characteristics
- Total length: 533.6 m (1,751 ft)
- Width: 45.8 m (150 ft)

History
- Construction start: 2017
- Construction end: 2020
- Opened: 22 December 2020

The Anna Jagiellon Bridge (Polish: Most Anny Jagiellonki) is a bridge, across the Vistula in Warsaw, Poland. It is the ninth bridge crossing the river in Warsaw, and the longest and most southern. The bridge carries the S2 expressway, which forms the southern bypass of Warsaw, linking the Warszawa Wschodnia junction, in Wilanów, with Wał Miedzeszyński junction, in Wawer.

The construction began in June 2017 and was finished by December 2020. The bridge consists of two independent structures running parallel, each carrying four traffic lanes and a separated pedestrian and cycling path. Its total length spans 1.5 kilometers running above the floodplain, extending 342 meters on the left (western) bank and 628 meters on the right one. The western part of the bridge was constructed using the incremental launching method, the part in the river using the balanced cantilever method and the eastern one using a movable scaffolding system.

== Name ==
In numerous planning studies and documents the bridge was referred to with a generic name as the Southern Bridge (Polish: Most Południowy), which was also commonly treated as its name after completion. In August 2021, the bridge was named in honor Polish queen Anna Jagiellon.
