= Łazienki Bridge =

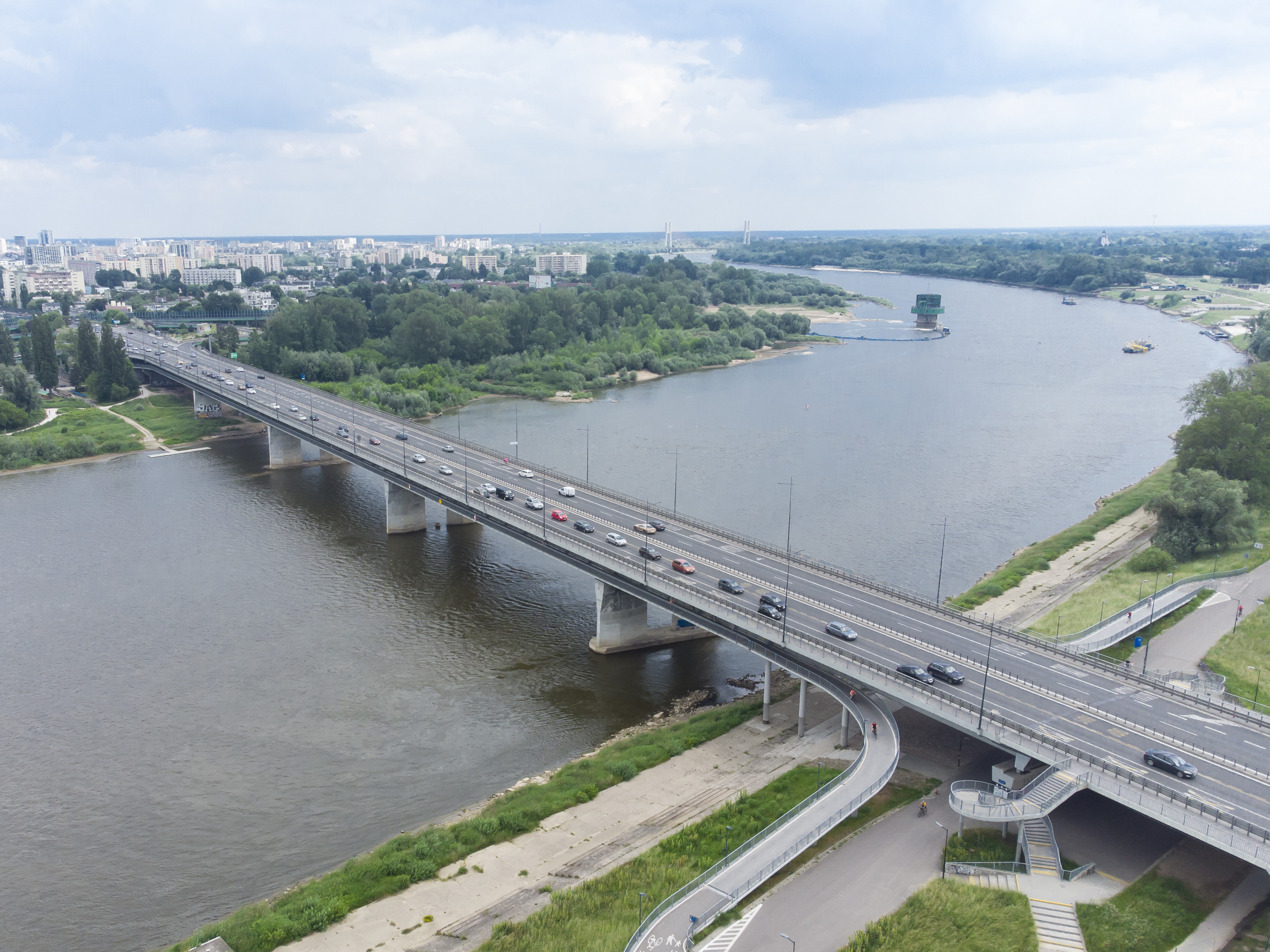
- Łazienki Bridge in 2022
- Coordinates: 52°14′N 21°03′E
- Carries: Vehicles, Pedestrian, Bicycles
- Crosses: Vistula River
- Locale: Warsaw, Poland
- Preceded by: Siekierki Bridge
- Followed by: Poniatowski Bridge

Characteristics
- Design: Girder bridge
- Total length: 423 metres (1,388 ft)
- Width: 28 metres (92 ft)

History
- Construction start: 1971
- Construction end: 1974
- Opened: 22 July 1974

Statistics
- Daily traffic: ca. 95000 (2014)

The Łazienki Bridge (Polish: Most Łazienkowski) is a five-span steel bridge, across the Vistula in Warsaw, Poland. It is 423 m long and 28 m wide, holding three lanes for vehicles each way, dedicated cycling lanes and sidewalks for pedestrians. The name refers to the Łazienki Park and Łazienki Palace, which are located to the south-west of the bridge.

The bridge was opened along with the Łazienkowska Thoroughfare on 22 July 1974, after three years' construction. At the bridgeheads interchanges were constructed with the Wisłostrada on the left bank and Wał Miedzyszyński on the right one.

Between 1981 and 1998 the bridge was formally named Most Łazienkowski im. gen. Zygmunta Berlinga (English: General Zygmunt Berling Łazienki Bridge) in honor of a Polish military commander who collaborated with the Soviets during World War II, but in practice, this name was almost never used. On a lawn underneath an entrance ramp on north-eastern side of the bridge a monument to the communist collaborator was unveiled in 1985, finally torn down in 2019 and transferred to the Museum of Polish History.

Between 2002 and 2014 the ramps connecting the bridge to the streets along both banks of the river had to be all gradually replaced due to their poor technical condition.

== 2015 fire ==
The bridge has a service corridor below the street level. Its purpose is structure inspection, but it also houses certain installations: medium voltage electricity, telecommunication fiber-optics, etc. Since construction it had wooden floor. Due to safety concerns it was decided that all wood and other flammable materials will be replaced. Ironically, on 14 February 2015 during replacement works, when a protective layer of asbestos was already removed, a fire broke out on the eastern bank under the bridge, where the dismantled materials were temporarily stored. The flames reached the bridge and set fire on yet-to-be-dismantled elements. It was initially expected that the fire should not cause serious damage, however, post-fire examination revealed that the flame temperature reached 1000 °C and damaged the steel load-bearing elements enough that the bridge required serious refurbishment, which cost 104 million złoty (about €25 million). It was reopened to the public on 20 October 2015.

== 2017 expansion ==
In 2017 two gangways were constructed underneath the sides of the bridge dedicated for cyclists and pedestrians, improving traffic safety by separating cyclists from vehicular traffic and providing convenient access to the bridge from the esplanades on the banks of the Vistula river.

== See also ==
- Poniatowski Bridge
- Świętokrzyski Bridge
- Siekierki Bridge
