= Łazienki Route =

Road in Warsaw, Poland

Route information
- Maintained by Zarząd Dróg Miejskich
- Length: 8.1 km (5.0 mi)
- Existed: 1974–present

Major junctions
- West end: Jerusalem Avenue
- DW 631 / Grójecka Str. DW 634 / Żwirki i Wigury Str./Raszyńska Str. DK 61 / DW 801 / Wał Miedzeszyński
- East end: Wiatraczna Roundabout

Location
- Country: Poland

Highway system
- National roads in Poland; Voivodeship roads

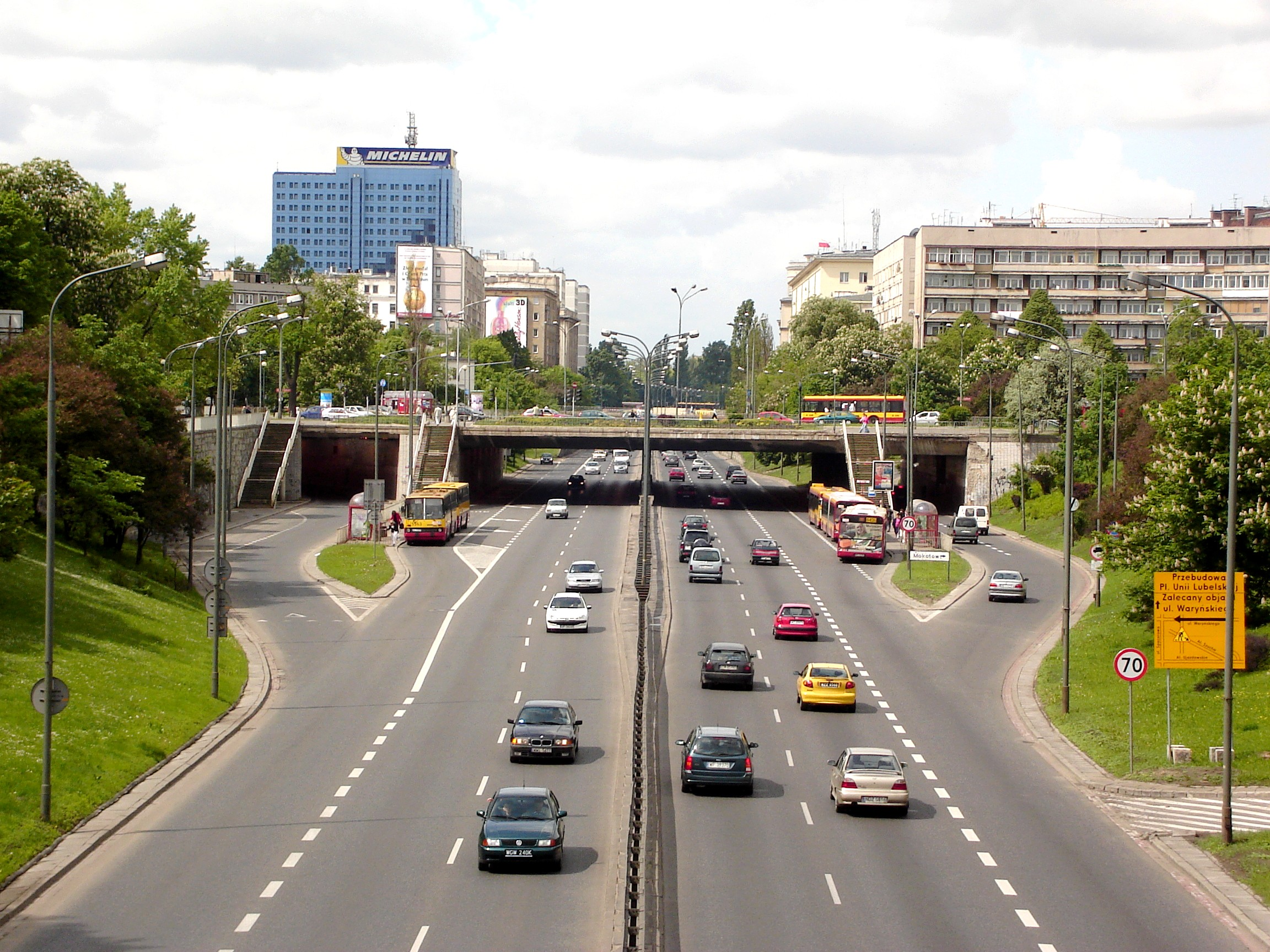
Łazienki Route

The Łazienki Route (Polish: Trasa Łazienkowska) is a road in Warsaw, Poland. It connects the center of Warsaw with the east-bank of Warsaw. It was built from 1971 to 1974.

The road is an important part of the east–west transportation infrastructure of Warsaw. It is classified as a class GP road ("fast traffic road") and has two or three lanes of traffic in each direction. The length of the route is 8.1 kilometres (5.0 mi).

The name of the road refers to Łazienki Park and Łazienki Palace, located to the south-west of the Łazienki Bridge.

== History ==
The oldest plans for the route date to the 1930s. It was built in the years 1971–74 in the People's Republic of Poland, during the era of Edward Gierek. It was opened on 22 July 1974, on the 30th anniversary of the People's Republic. The construction was one of three major infrastructure projects in Warsaw (the two others being the Warszawa Centralna railway station and Wisłostrada route). It was extended in the 1990s. It has been subject to various major repairs over its history; the most recent one in preparation for the UEFA 2012 (the route was part of the main transportation route between the Okęcie Airport and the National Stadium).

The original plans for the road were to service 5,000 cars per hour; currently it serves over 7,000.

== Location ==
The road is a key element in the east–west transportation infrastructure of Warsaw. It connects the center of Warsaw (Ochota and Śródmieście) with the eastern side of the river (Praga Południe).

The road is classified as a "fast traffic road" (GP) in Poland, with two to three lanes of traffic in each direction. The length of the route is 9.1 kilometres (5.7 mi). Until the end of 2013, most of the route was the part of the National road 2.

Łazienki Bridge (formerly the Zygmunt Berling Bridge) over the River Vistula is part of the route.

== In popular culture ==
The route was popularized in the 1970s Polish TV series Czterdziestolatek, and a 2012 article in Polish daily Gazeta Wyborcza noted that thanks to the popularity of the show, it is most likely the "most famous road in Poland".
