= Poniatowski Bridge =

Poniatowski Bridge Most Poniatowskiego
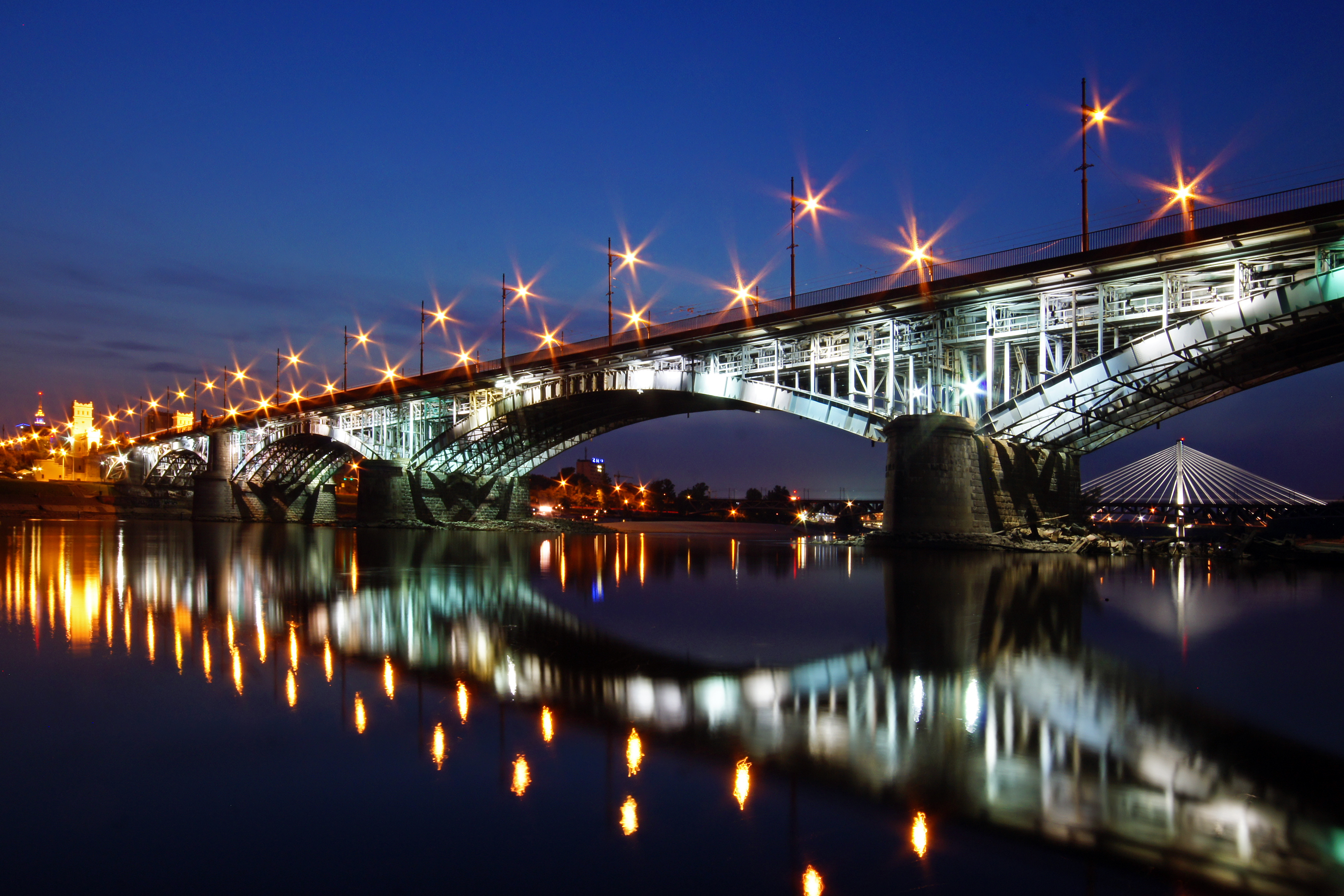
- Poniatowski Bridge illuminated at night
- Coordinates: 52°14′10″N 21°02′29″E
- Carries: Motor vehicles, Light rail, Pedestrians
- Crosses: Vistula River
- Locale: Warsaw, Poland, Poland
- Preceded by: Łazienki Bridge
- Followed by: Cross-City Bridge

Characteristics
- Design: Deck arch bridge
- Material: Steel
- Total length: 506 metres (1,660 ft)
- Width: 21.40 metres (70.2 ft)
- Longest span: 80 metres (260 ft)
- No. of spans: 8

History
- Architect: Stefan Szyller
- Engineering design by: Mieczysław Marszewski, Wacław Paszkowski
- Constructed by: K. Rudzki i S-ka
- Construction start: 1904
- Opened: 6 January 1914

Location
- Interactive map of Poniatowski Bridge

The Poniatowski Bridge (Polish: Most Poniatowskiego) is a bridge in Warsaw, Poland. Originally built between 1904 and 1914, it was damaged in each World War and rebuilt after each. It spans the Vistula River, connecting Warsaw's Powiśle and Praga districts. Its viaduct is an extension of Jerusalem Avenue, a principal Warsaw thoroughfare.

== History ==
The 506 m long steel bridge, consisting of eight spans, was designed by Stefan Szyller. Its construction, begun in 1904, was carried out by the K. Rudzki i S-ka company and supervised by engineers Mieczysław Marszewski and Wacław Paszkowski. Kazimierz Ołdakowski was another engineer who worked on the bridge, before he took over the directorship of Fabryka Broni. Despite being viewed by many as an extravagance (opponents of its construction included the then mayor of Warsaw and the writer Bolesław Prus), it was opened on January 6, 1914, by the Russian Governor General, Georgi Skalon, as Warsaw's third bridge; hence it was nicknamed "third bridge" (Polish: "trzeci most") by the city's residents, though its official name was Bridge of Our Most Gracious Ruler, Tsar Nicholas II (Warsaw then being part of the Russian Empire, following the 18th-century partitions of Poland). After Poland regained independence in 1918, the bridge was renamed after Prince Józef Poniatowski and acquired a new nickname — "Poniatoszczak" — which it retains to this day.

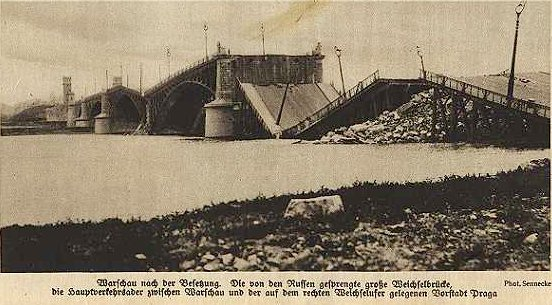
Poniatowski Bridge after being blown up by the Russian Army in 1915.

Poniatowski Bridge during the 1915 fire (shortly after being rebuilt from being blown up).

The bridge suffered a lot during the World Wars. During the First World War, in 1915, the retreating Russian army blew up four of the spans to slow down the pursuing Germans. The bridge was hastily rebuilt by the Germans—only to burn down in an accident soon afterwards. After the war, the structure was rebuilt by the new Polish government over the course of five years, from 1921 to 1926. During the May Coup the bridge was the meeting place of the President of Poland, Stanisław Wojciechowski, and the leader of the coup, Marshal of Poland Józef Piłsudski. During the Second World War the bridge was destroyed by German troops during the Warsaw Uprising, on 13 September 1944. That demolition was much more complete: all spans were toppled, and only the lower piers survived.

The first post-war plans by the new (communist) Polish government provided for the construction of a temporary wooden structure on the surviving pillars, but hasty work caused the bridge to collapse. Restored again on new pillars, the bridge was reopened again on 22 July 1946 by Bolesław Bierut. However, by now the reopened bridge had lost much of its pre-war splendor, as limited funds meant no resources to restore the various decorative neo-Polish renaissance features, such as the hand-made balustrades or stone benches. Some of the old pre-war benches, as well as one of the old spans, can be seen in the water near the bridge at low tide. In 1949, under the direction of Eng. Tadeusz Chyliński of the Institute of Aviation, stain gauge measurements of stresses in the bridge spans were carried out during test loading.

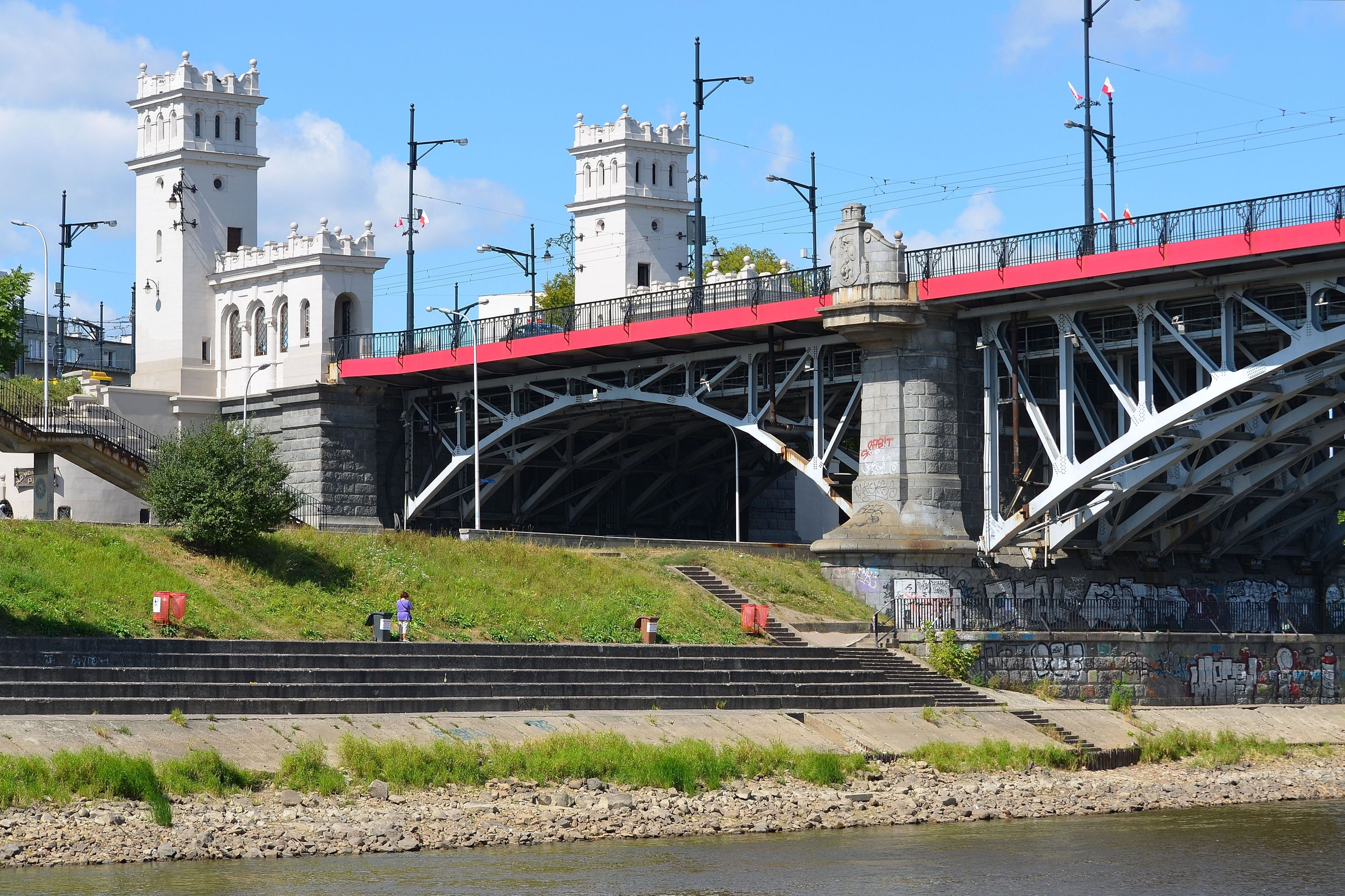
Renovated small towers as of 2013.

Between 1963 and 1966 the bridge was widened, a trolley track was separated from the carriageway and the bridge was connected to the Wisłostrada expressway on the left bank of the Vistula by means of a long looping sloped roadway section which reminded some commentators of a snail's shell. During another repair and expansion in 1985–1990, when the roads on the right bank (Praga) were expanded, a temporary bridge (Syrena Bridge) was erected (it was in use until replaced by Świętokrzyski Bridge in 2000).

In 2004 a reconstruction and beautification program of the bridge began. By 2005 the small towers and the first four spans had been rebuilt. The tramway track was modernized and rebuilt in 2007.

== Gallery ==
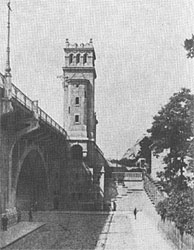
Viaduct and small towers - north side, 1914

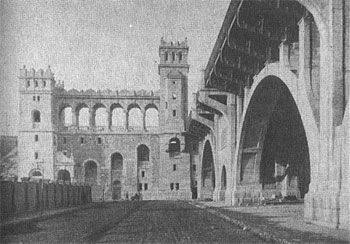
Viaduct and small towers - south side, 1914

The bridge before the First World War, 1914.

The bridge before the First World War, 1914.

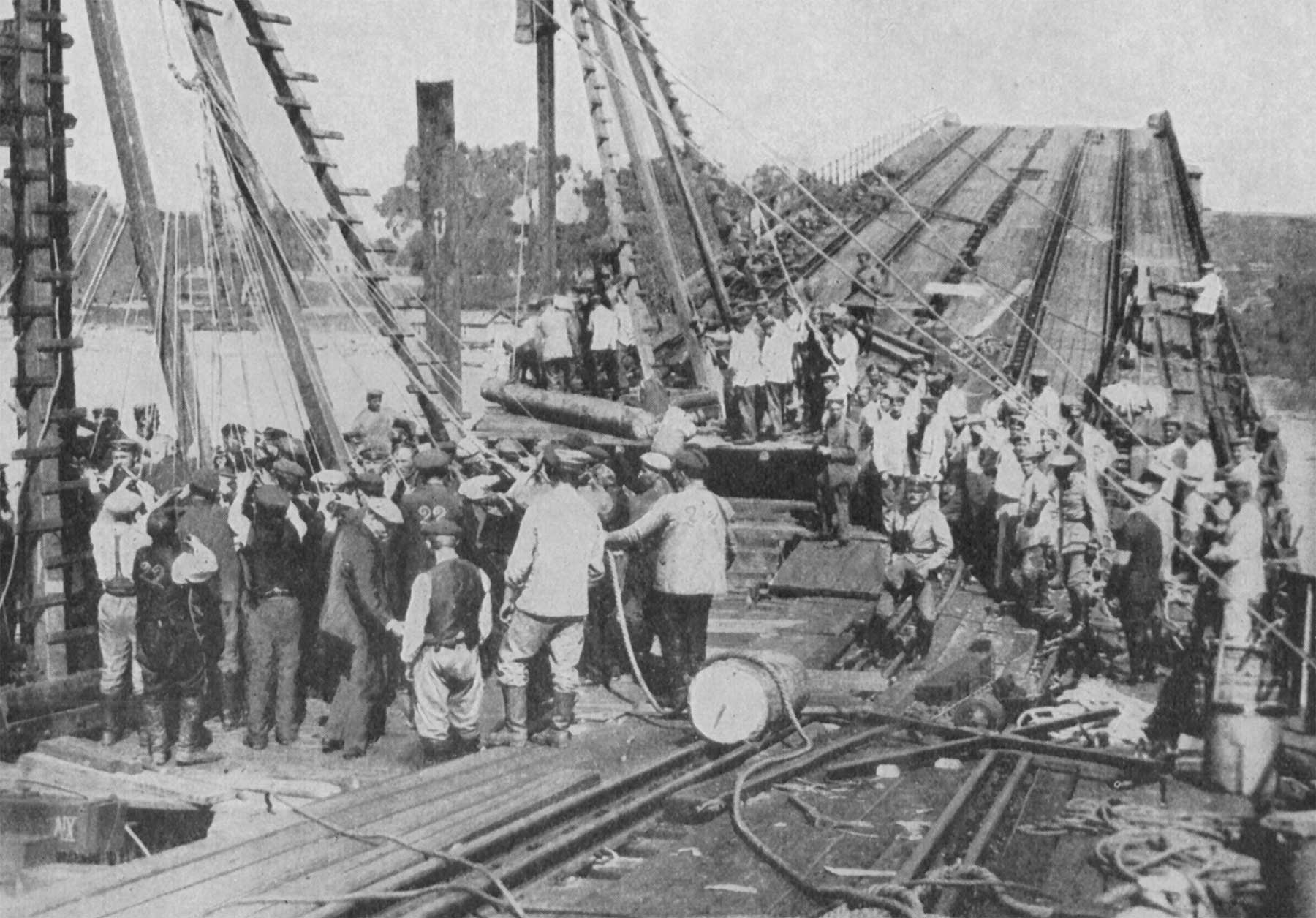
Bridge being rebuilt shortly before the fire of 1915

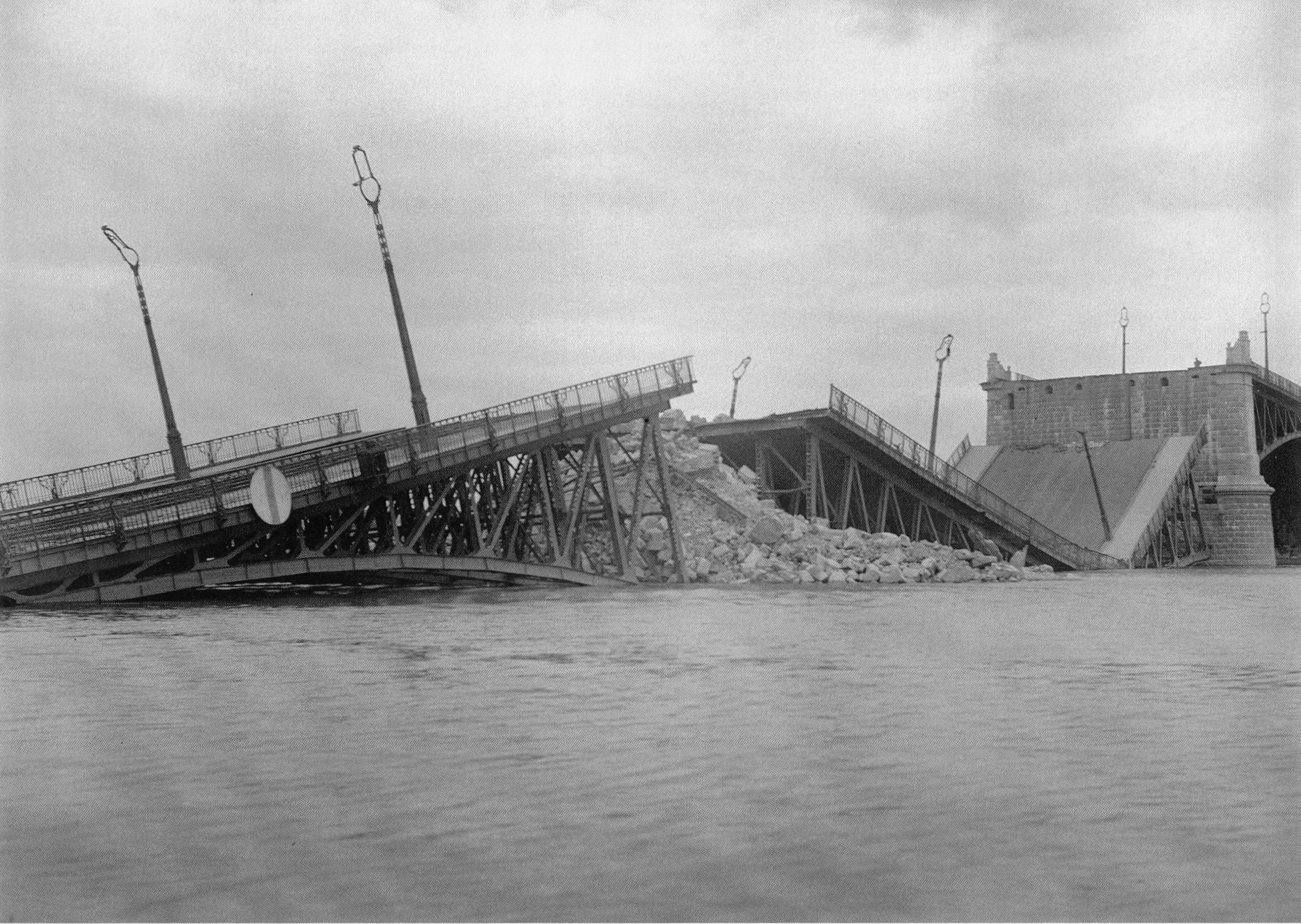
Poniatowski Bridge after being blown up by the Russian Army in 1915

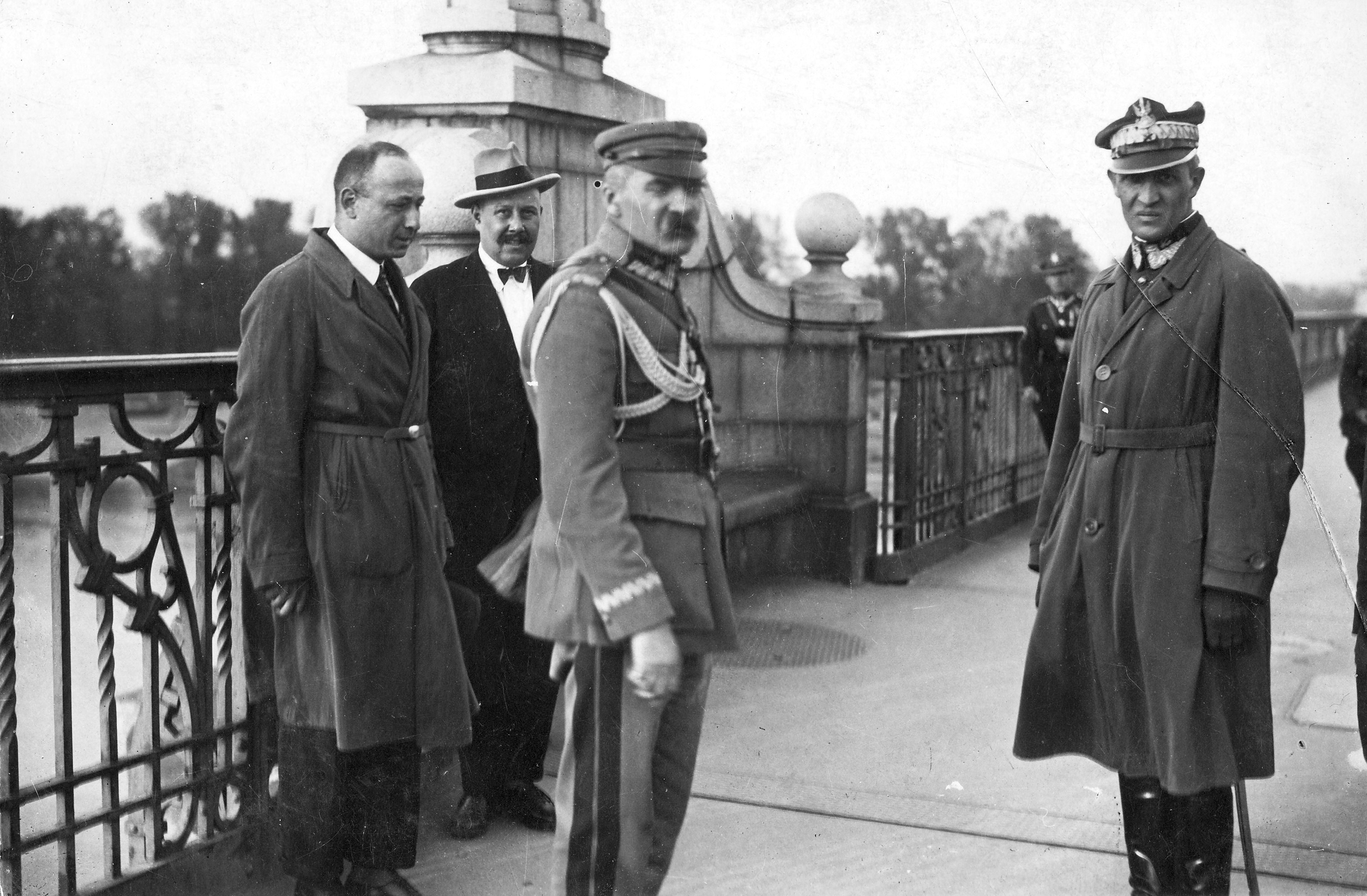
Marshall Józef Piłsudski on Poniatowski Bridge, 1926.

The bridge in the interwar period (1936 or earlier).

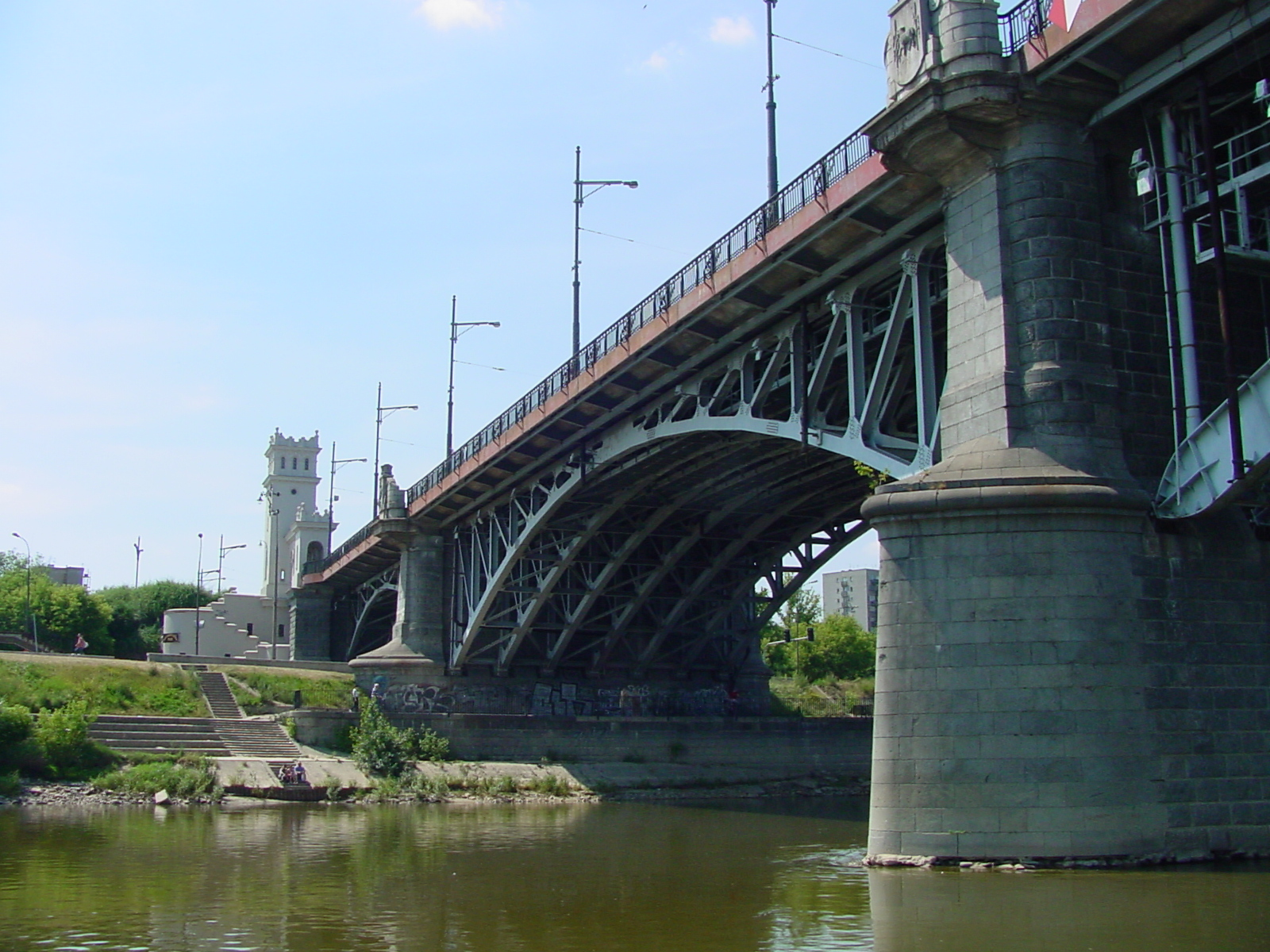
Poniatowski Bridge - from below.

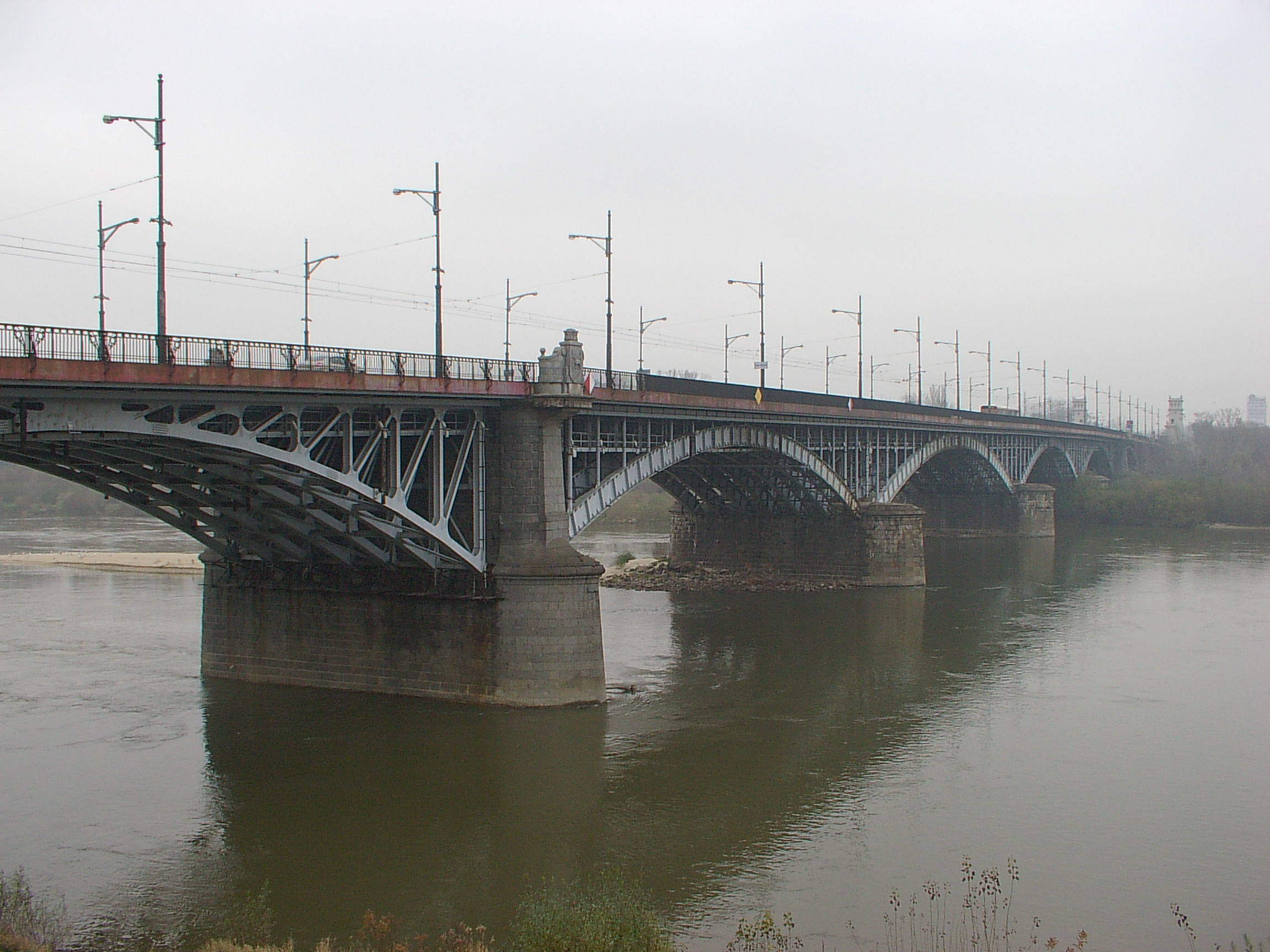
Poniatowski Bridge - from the river.

== See also ==
- Łazienki Bridge
- Siekierki Bridge
- Świętokrzyski Bridge
