= Trams in Warsaw =

Tram system in Warsaw, Poland

- Tramwaje Warszawskie sp. z o.o. logo

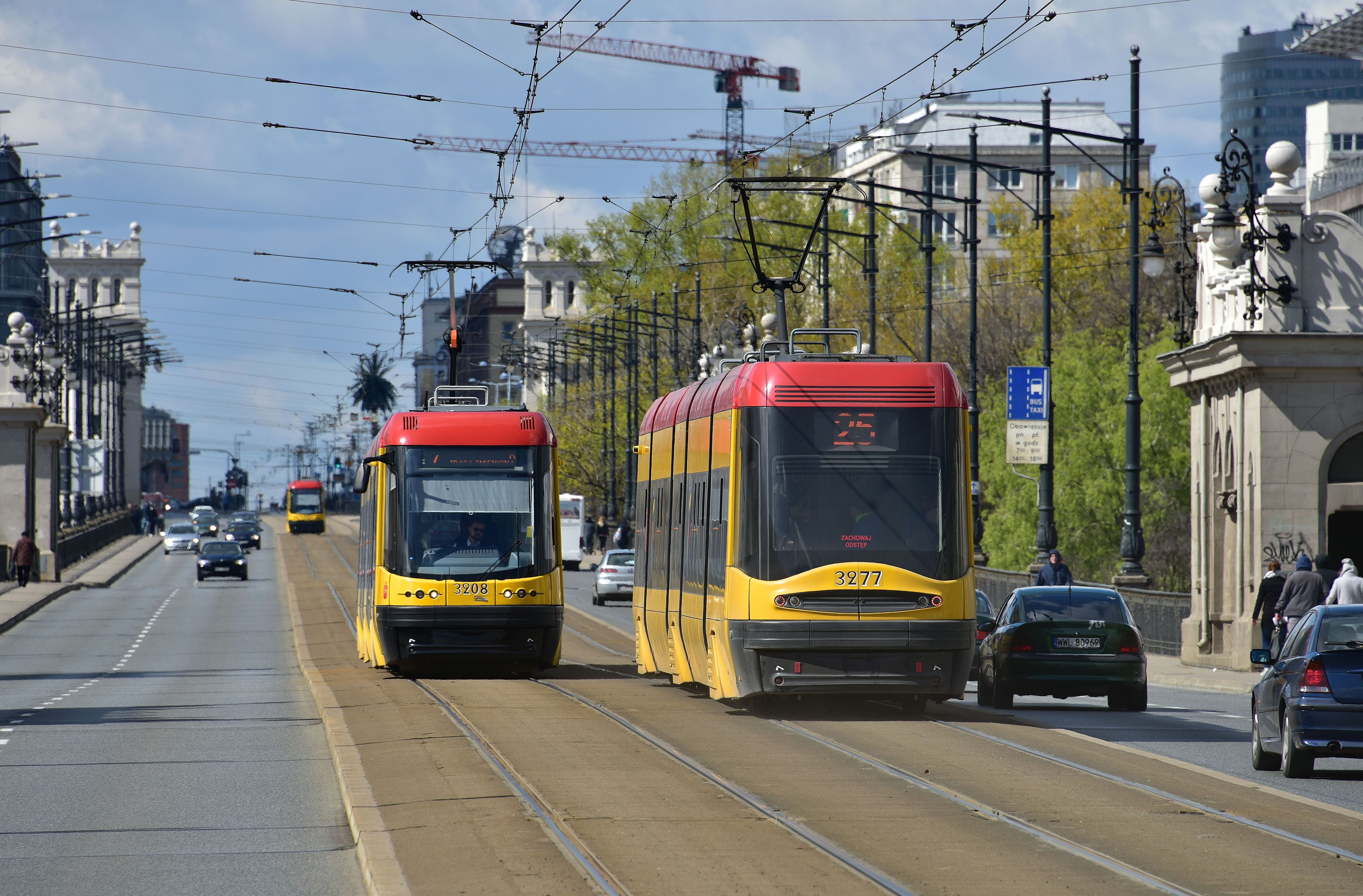
- Pesa Swing tram on Poniatowski Bridge

Overview
- Native name: Tramwaje Warszawskie
- Locale: Warsaw, Poland
- Transit type: tram
- Number of lines: 28
- Website: Official website Warsaw Public Transport

Operation
- Began operation: 11 December 1866
- Operator: Tramwaje Warszawskie

Technical
- System length: 1,845 km (1,146 mi) (Note: The figure given in the source is 292.4 km (181.7 mi) of single track in passenger service. It is assumed that the length of all routes (nearly all of them being double track) is about half that figure.)
- Track gauge: 1,435 mm (4 ft 8 1/2 in) standard gauge
System map
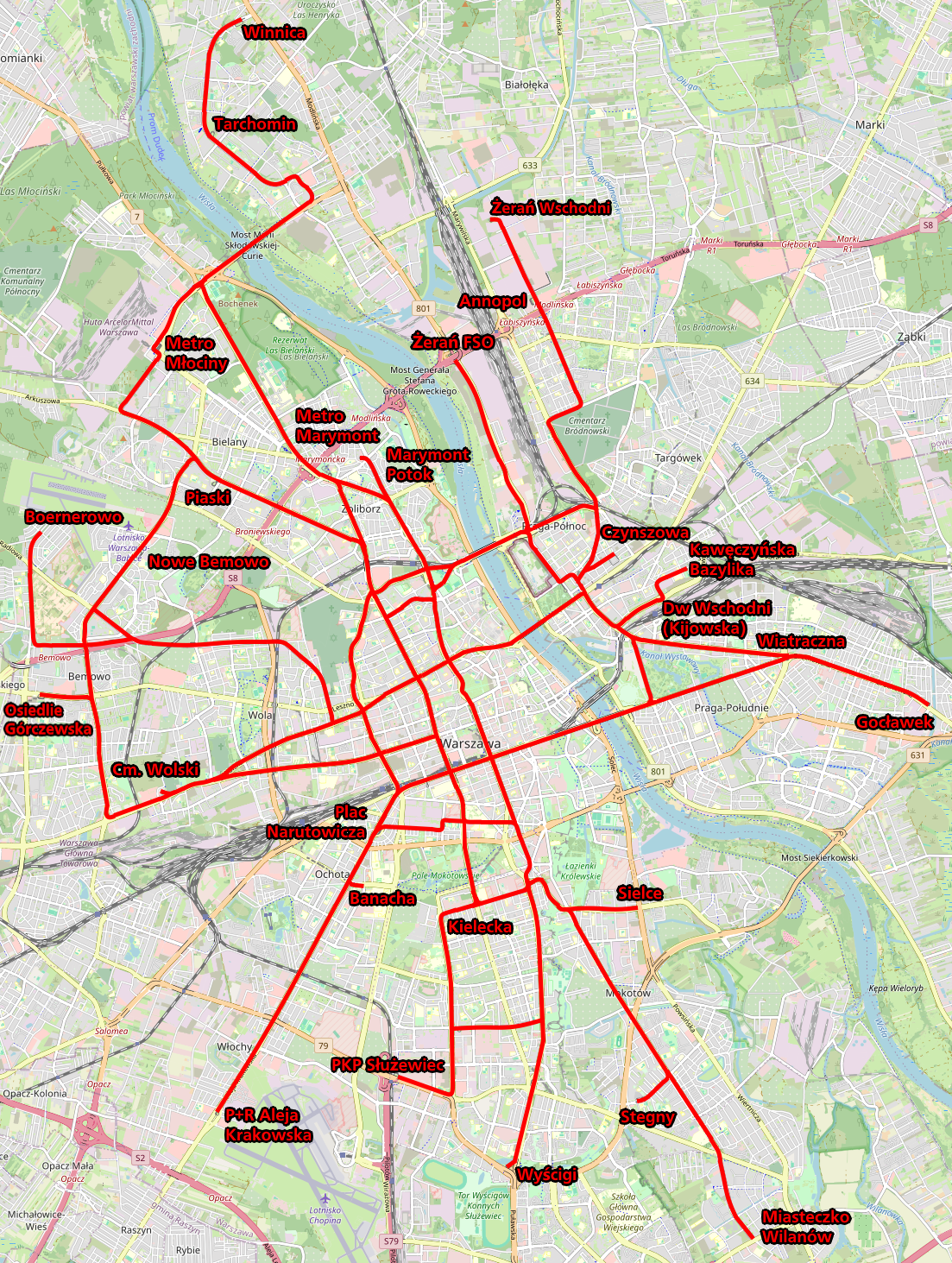
Map of all Warsaw Tram lines (This does not show temporary/long term closures)

Map of Warsaw tramway network before 1945

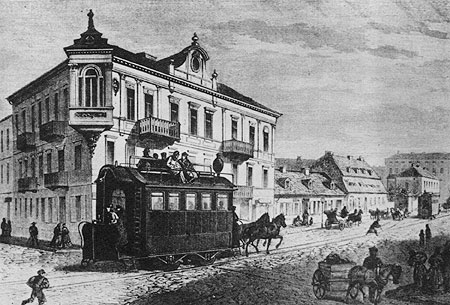
Horse tram on Marszałkowska Street, 1867

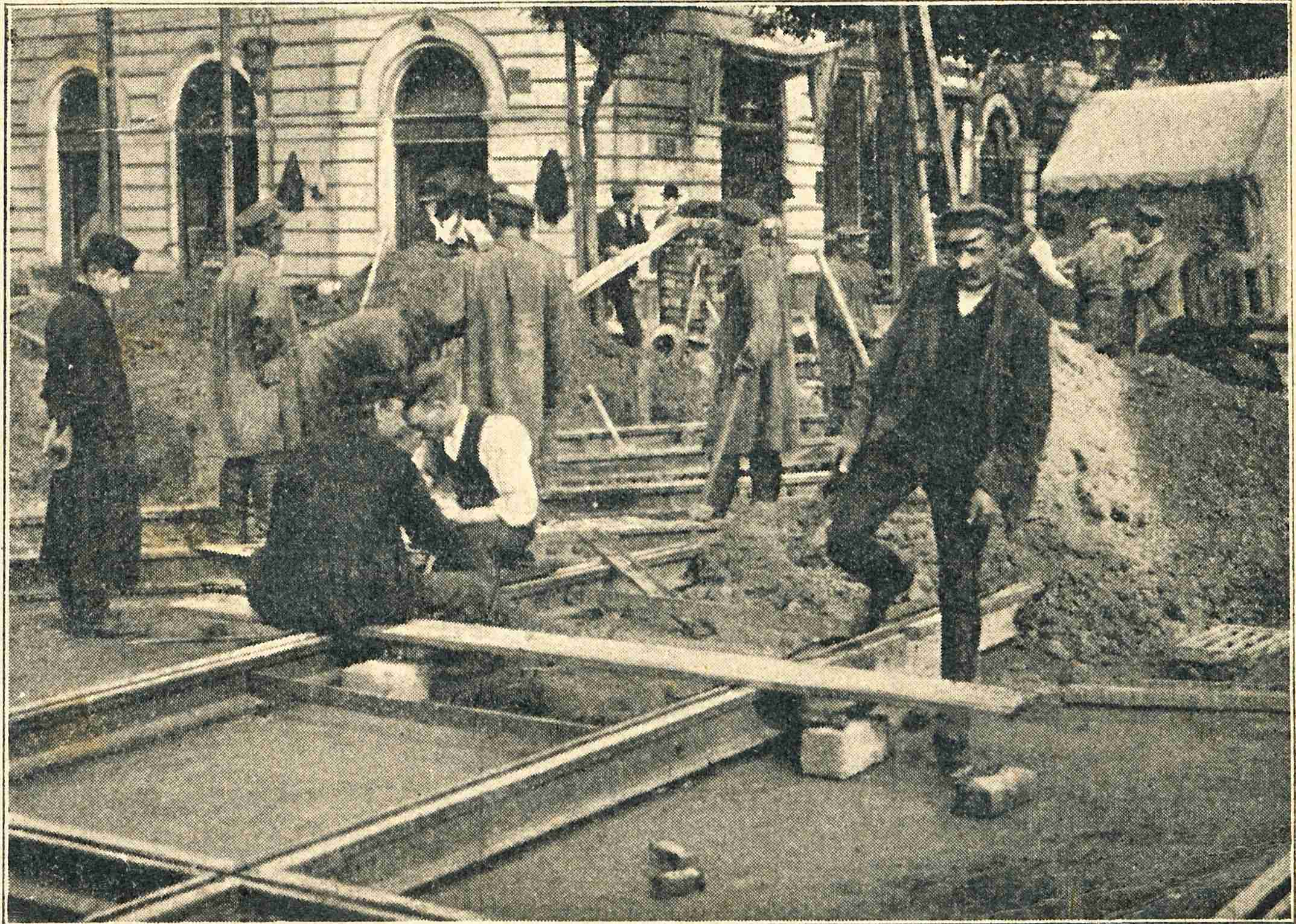
Electric tramway construction, Warsaw, Marszałkowska Street and Jerusalem Avenue intersection, 1907

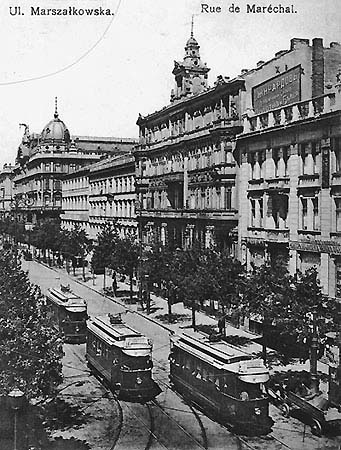
Electric trams on Marszałkowska Street, 1914

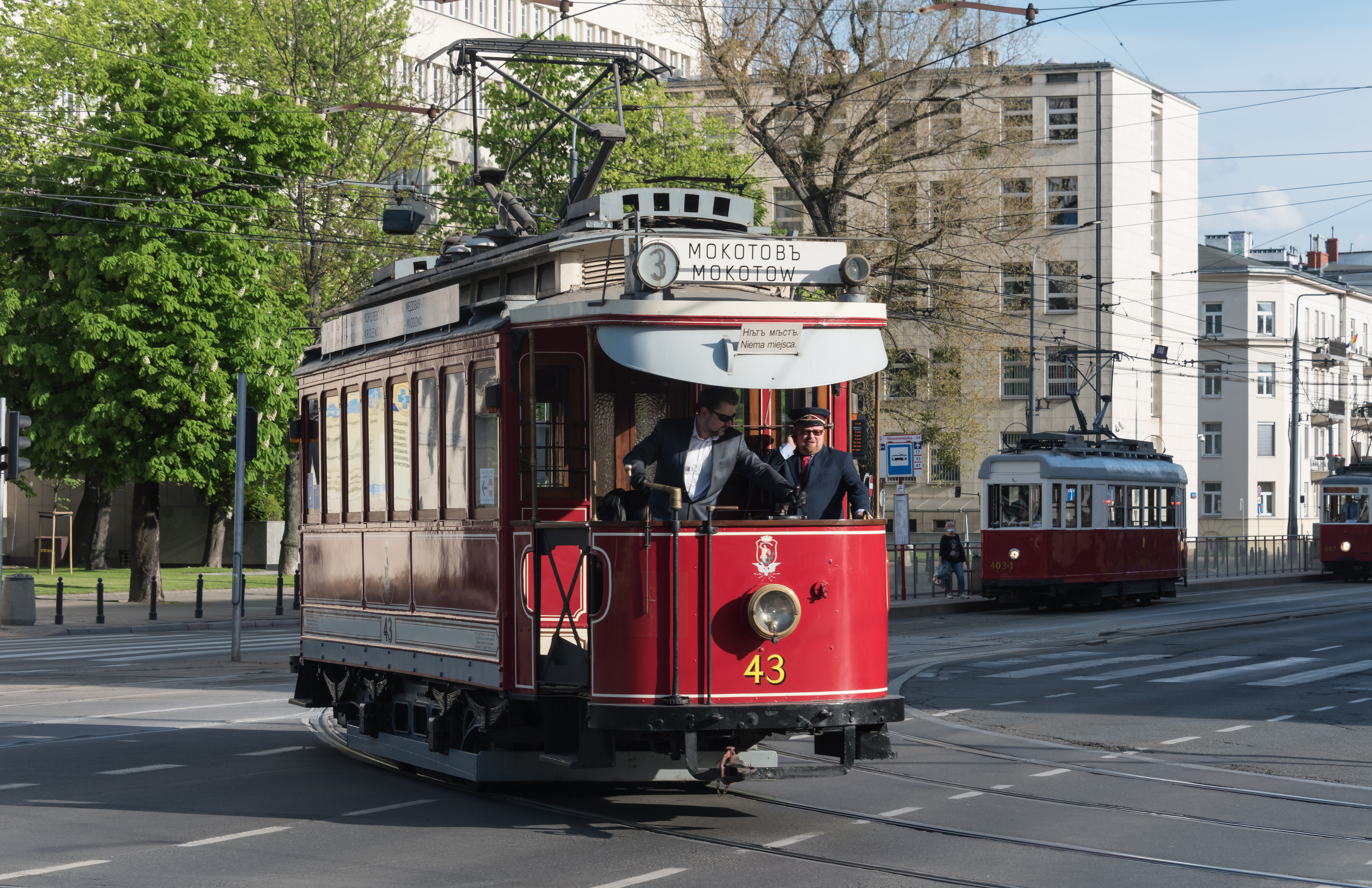
Restored type A, K and N trams running during a Night of Museums in 2021

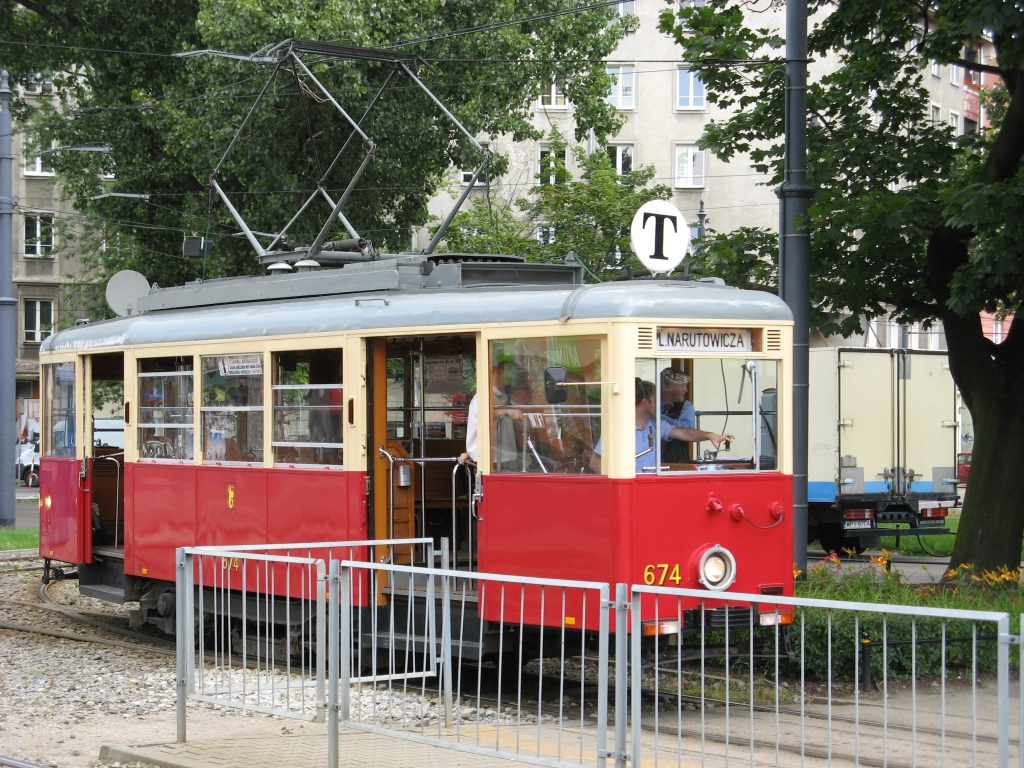
Restored Konstal N tram car from the 1950s running on a special tourist line

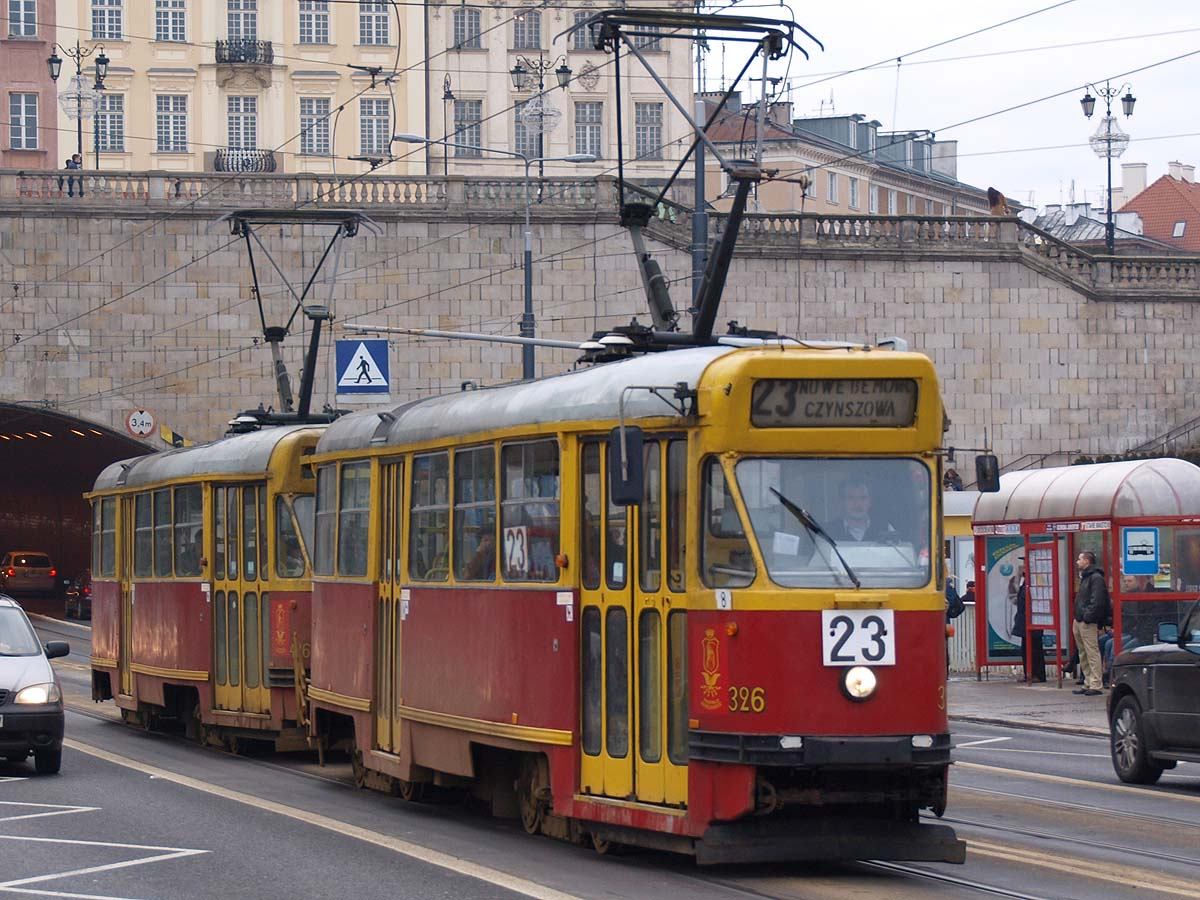
Konstal 13N tram cars from the 1960s, retired in 2012

The Warsaw tram network is a 146.2-kilometer (90.8 mi) tram system serving a third of Warsaw, Poland, and serving half the city's population. It operates 726 cars, and is the second-largest system in the country (after the Silesian system). There are about 25 regular lines, forming a part of the city's integrated public transport system organized by the Warsaw Transport Authority. Since 1994, the system is operated by the municipally owned company Tramwaje Warszawskie sp. z.o.o.

== History ==
=== Horse tram ===
The history of tram transport in Warsaw dates back to 1866 when a 6-kilometre (3.7 mi) long horse tram line was built to transport goods and passengers between the Vienna Railway Station and the Petersburg and Terespol railway stations across the Vistula River. This was in order to circumvent limitations imposed by Russian authorities, which prevented the construction of a railway bridge for strategic reasons. In 1880, a second line was constructed with the help of Belgian capital, this time intended as public transit within the city. The Belgian company quickly expanded its own lines, and in 1882 took over the line between the railway stations, which had lost most of its original purpose after a railway bridge was finally built in 1875. In 1899 the entire tram system, by then 30 kilometres (19 mi) of tracks with 234 tram cars and 654 horses operating 17 lines, was purchased by the city. By 1903, plans were drafted to convert the system to electric trams, which was done by 1908.

=== Interbellum ===
The development mostly stagnated for the next 10 years with only a few short stretches built. After World War I, the network developed rapidly handling increased traffic and extending to the outskirts of the city with the network reaching the length of 60 kilometres (37 mi) and 757 tram cars in 1939. In 1927, a privately owned light rail line called EKD (today Warszawska Kolej Dojazdowa) was built, connecting several neighboring towns with the center of Warsaw using electric motor coaches similar to trams, only faster, larger and more massive, with frequent stops and tracks running along the streets in city; however the system was incompatible with the Warsaw trams as it used standard gauge tracks while the city network still used Russian gauge left from Russian times. In 1925, the company operating the Warsaw trams decided to construct an underground system. Preliminary boring started, but the work was suspended because of the Great Depression; the idea resurfaced in 1938, but was again buried with the outbreak of World War II.

=== Second half of the 20th century ===
The tram system remained operational, although gradually deteriorating, during most of the Nazi occupation until the Warsaw Uprising in 1944, after which all the infrastructure was systematically destroyed. After the war it was rebuilt relatively fast. As the system was practically built from scratch the occasion was used to convert it to standard gauge. During the 1950s and 1960s, the network was extended to newly built districts of soviet style panel houses and industrial plants and newer trams based on the design of Presidents' Conference Committee were introduced. Due to the city's lack of a metro system and restriction on car ownership, the tram system remained the backbone of Warsaw's transport system. In the 1960s, however, a political decision was made to increase the dependency on oil imported from Russia, while Polish coal was to be exported to Western Europe in exchange for hard currency; as a result, newly developed districts were connected with the city center by buses rather than trams, and some of the existing tracks were closed.

=== Present situation ===
After 1989, the tram system in Warsaw initially received little investment with a large part of the city's budget spent on the construction of the first Warsaw Metro line. However, since 2005, the situation has been changing with the purchase of new rolling stock, modernization of key tram lines, and deployment of a passenger information system. Plans also include extension of the network and an "intelligent" traffic management system which is to prioritize trams at traffic lights. In August 2008, a tender for delivery of 186 low-floor, air-conditioned trams was launched, allowing for a dramatic overhaul of the look of the tramway system.

In 2014 a first entirely new line since a quarter century was opened, connecting Tarchomin, a quickly growing remote residential district on the north-eastern outskirts of the city, with the existing tram network and the M1 metro line. The route underwent further expansion with the latest 1 km (0.6 mi) long segment finished in September 2021 after multiple delays. More new lines are being planned: one with 4 km (2.5 mi) of new tracks to Gocław, and another to the eastern parts of the Białołęka district. The construction of a new tram route to Wilanów was launched in August 2022 and was completed in October 2024. It is unclear when work will start on the line to Gocław.

== Rolling stock ==
Image	Tram car type	Low-floor	Number of cars	Description
	Konstal 105Na	No	250 cars (123 two-car sets + 4 retired cars)	An evolution of the earlier Konstal 13N. Used in sets of two. Single units and Sets of three had been used in the past, but they were replaced by new low-floor trams.
	Konstal 105N2k/2000	No	62 cars (31 two-car sets)	105Na with a new front. Produced from 2000 to 2001. Only used in sets of two.
	HCP 123N	No	30 cars (15 two-car sets)	Based on 105Na. Produced in 2007.
	Konstal 112N	partly	1	A single prototype Konstal 112N, partially low-floor, two-section articulated tram based on 105Na, built in 1995.
	Konstal 116N/116Na	partly	29	Vehicles feature three sections and a larger percentage of low-floor area (approx. 60%), designated 116N/116Na, produced between 1998 and 2000.
	Pesa 120N	Yes	15	Pesa 120N was the first tram in Warsaw with 100% of low floor. It was bought in 2007 to operate a modernized route in the city center.
	Pesa Swing(120Na)	Yes	180	In 2009 186 vehicles (120Na) were purchased to operate a planned new line and to replace some of the oldest trams.
	Pesa Swing (120NaDuo)	Yes	6	At the request of the city, the last 6 units were manufactured as bi-directional, designated 120NaDuo, to allow using them on a partially built line with no balloon loop.
	Pesa Jazz Duo (128N)	Yes	50	In 2013 50 bi-directional trams of a new design were purchased from PESA to be delivered in 2014, planned to allow operating on possible new lines during their construction and sections of existing tracks during maintenance works that made balloon loop inaccessible.
	PESA 134N	Yes	30	Ordered in January 2014 from PESA in Bydgoszcz They are used on less loaded lines. They were bought to replace old single cars from Konstal.
	Hyundai Rotem 140N	Yes	85	Bi-directional, articulated, five-section vehicles, ordered in June 2019, to be delivered by April 2023.
	Hyundai Rotem 141N	Yes	18	Unidirectional version of 140N, ordered in June 2019, to be delivered by April 2023.
	Hyundai Rotem 142N	Yes	20	Short (three-section) version of 141N, ordered in June 2019, to be delivered by April 2023.
Total number of sets:			603	
Percentage of low-floor sets:			71,2%	

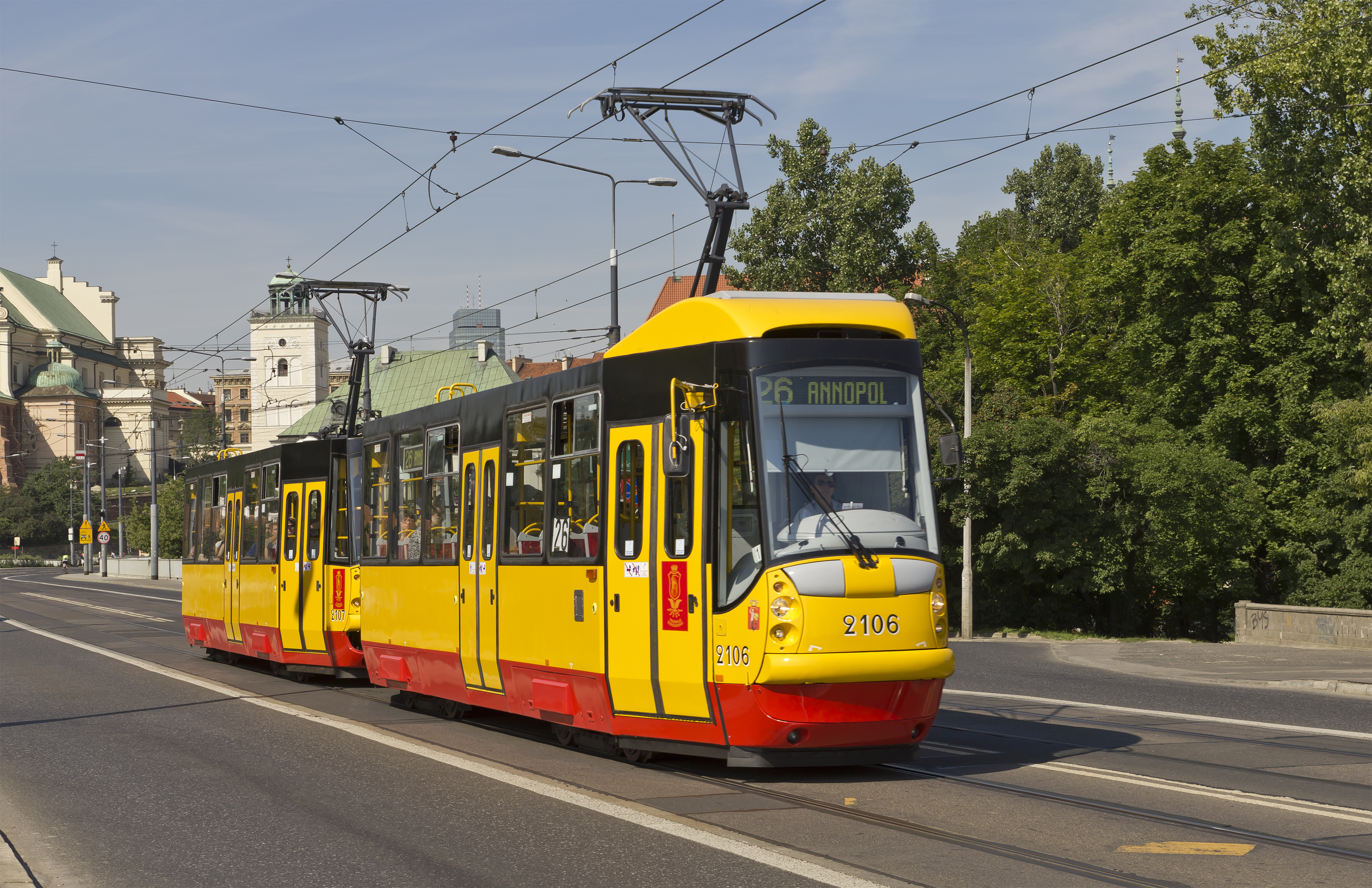
Konstal 105N2k/2000

=== Tram depots ===
Depot	Address	Photo	Year est.	Lines
ZET R-1 Wola	Młynarska 2		1903	9, 10, 11, 13, 14, 20, 23, 24, 26, 27, 28
ZET R-2 Praga	Kawęczyńska 16		1925	3, 6, 7, 9, 13, 22, 23, 24, 25, 26, 28
ZET R-3 Mokotów	Woronicza 27		1955	1, 4, 7, 9, 10, 14, 15, 17, 18, 25, 31, 33, 35
ZET R-4 Żoliborz	Zgrupowania Kampinos 10		1963	1, 2, 4, 6, 11, 15, 17, 18, 22, 24, 26, 28, 33, 35
ZET R-5 Annopol	Warszawskich Tramwajarzy 1		2024	1, 3, 4, 25

=== Historic fleet ===
Image	Model	Tram car type	Year of manufacture	Fleet number
	A	Falkenried/MAN	1907	43
	Lw	Linke-Hoffman Werke	1925	541
	C	Lilpop, Rau i Loewenstein	1925	257
	K	Gdańska Fabryka Wagonów	1940	403-1
	K	Wspólnota Interesów w Katowicach	1940	445
	K	?	1940	446
	N	Konstal	1949	607
	N	Konstal	1951	734
	ND	Sanocka Fabryka Wagonów	1951	1620
	4N	Konstal	1961	873
	4ND	Konstal	1960	1811
	4Nj	Konstal	1957	838
	13N	Konstal	1959	503
	13N	Konstal	1967	407
	13N	Konstal	1968	462
	13N	Konstal	1969	795
	13N	Konstal	1969	821+818
	102N	Konstal	1969	5
	102Na	Konstal	1971	42
	105N	Konstal	1975	1000, 1001
	105Na	Konstal	1988	1252+1251

== Tickets ==
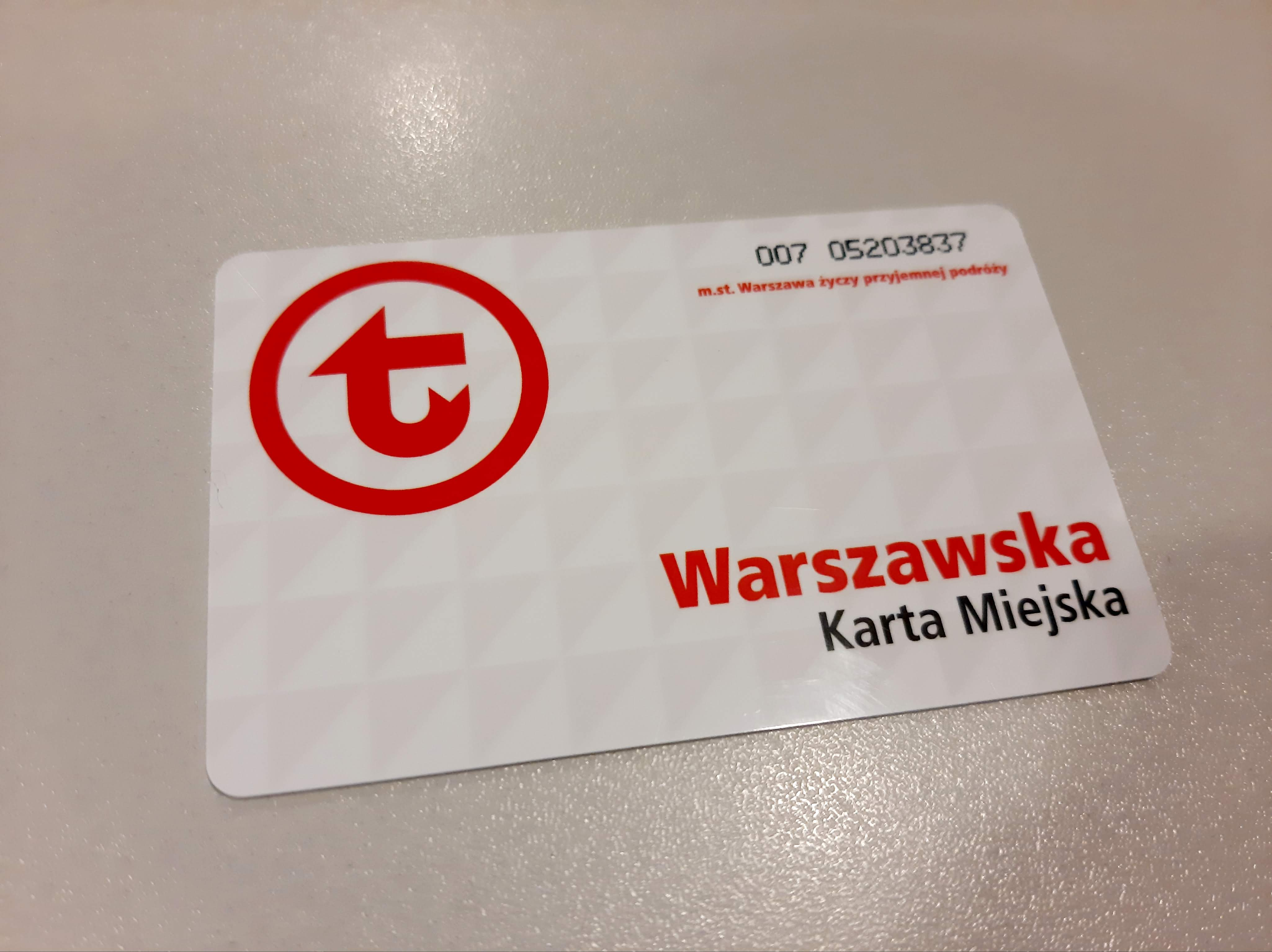
Warszawska Karta Miejska, city travel card

There is a single fare system for every mode of transportation. Tickets can be purchased at ticket machines and newsagents all over the city, as well as using a mobile app.

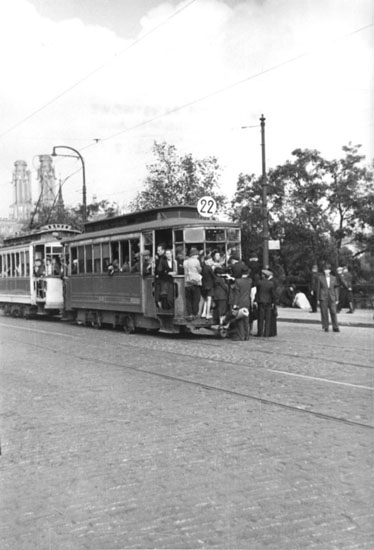
Warsaw tram line 22 in 1940

== Route list ==
This is a list of Warsaw Tramway lines. As of 2015, there were several track closures all over the tramway system, due to the construction of the second metro line. This list shows tram lines operating as of 26 October 2024 and the routes they operate on as of the same date.

Daily	1, 2, 3, 4, 6, 7, 9, 10, 11, 13, 14, 15, 16, 17, 18, 19, 20, 22, 23, 24, 26, 27, 28, 33
Weekdays	25, 31
Tourist (May-September)	36, T

Route number	Description	Map
1	(Żerań Wschodni) Annopol ↔ (Banacha) P+R Aleja Krakowska; Annopol – Rembielińska – Matki Teresy z Kalkuty – Odrowąża – rondo Żaba – Starzyńskiego – most Gdański – Słomińskiego – rondo Zgrupowania AK „Radosław” – Okopowa – Towarowa – rondo Daszyńskiego – Towarowa – plac Zawiszy – Grójecka – plac Narutowicza – Grójecka – (Stefana Banacha) - Aleja Krakowska	
2	Winnica ↔ Metro Młociny; Światowida – Kuklińskiego – most Skłodowskiej-Curie – Zgrupowania AK „Kampinos”	
3	Annopol ↔ Gocławek; Annopol – Rembielińska – Matki Teresy z Kalkuty – Odrowąża – rondo Żaba – 11 listopada – Targowa – plac Wileński – Targowa – Zamoyskiego – Grochowska	
4	Wyścigi ↔ Żerań Wschodni; Puławska – plac Unii Lubelskiej – Marszałkowska – plac Zbawiciela – Marszałkowska – rondo Dmowskiego – Marszałkowska – plac Bankowy – aleja Solidarności – most Śląsko-Dąbrowski – aleja Solidarności – Jagiellońska – Ratuszowa – Targowa – 11 Listopada – rondo Żaba – Odrowąża – Matki Teresy z Kalkuty – Rembielińska – Annopol	
6	Gocławek ↔ Metro Młociny; Grochowska – Zamoyskiego – Targowa – plac Wileński – Targowa – Ratuszowa – Jagiellońska – Starzyńskiego – most Gdański – Słomińskiego – Międzyparkowa – Andersa – Mickiewicza – plac Inwalidów – Mickiewicza – plac Wilsona – Słowackiego – Marymoncka – Zgrupowania AK „Kampinos”	
7	Kawęczyńska-Bazylika ↔ Banacha; Kawęczyńska – Kijowska – Targowa – aleja Zieleniecka – aleja Poniatowskiego – most Poniatowskiego – Aleje Jerozolimskie – rondo Dmowskiego – Aleje Jerozolimskie – plac Zawiszy – Grójecka – plac Narutowicza - Grójecka - Stefana Banacha	
9	Gocławek (Wiatraczna) ↔ P+R Aleja Krakowska; Grochowska – aleja Waszyngtona – aleja Poniatowskiego – most Poniatowskiego – Aleje Jerozolimskie – rondo Dmowskiego – Aleje Jerozolimskie – plac Zawiszy – Grójecka – plac Narutowicza – Grójecka – aleja Krakowska	
10	Osiedle Górczewska ↔ Wyścigi Górczewska - Powstańców Śląskich – Połczyńska – Wolska – Kasprzaka – Prosta – aleja Jana Pawła II – Chałubińskiego – aleja Niepodległości – Nowowiejska – plac Politechniki – Nowowiejska – plac Zbawiciela – Marszałkowska – plac Unii Lubelskiej – Puławska	
11	Sielce ↔ Cmentarz Wolski (Nowe Bemowo); Gagarina – Spacerowa – Goworka – Puławska – Marszałkowska – Nowowiejska – aleja Niepodległości – Chałubińskiego – aleja Jana Pawła II – Prosta – Kasprzaka – Wolska - (Powstańców Śląskich)	
13	Kawęczyńska-Bazylika ↔ Cmentarz Wolski; Kawęczyńska – Kijowska – Targowa – plac Wileński – aleja Solidarności – most Śląsko-Dąbrowski – aleja Solidarności – Wolska	
14	Banacha ↔ Miasteczko Wilanów; Stefana Banacha - Grójecka - plac Narutowicza – Filtrowa – Krzywickiego – Nowowiejska – plac Politechniki – Nowowiejska – plac Zbawiciela – Marszałkowska – plac Unii Lubelskiej – Puławska - Goworka - Spacerowa - Belwederska - Sobieskiego - aleja Rzeczypospolitej	
15	Marymont-Potok ↔ P+R Aleja Krakowska; Mickiewicza – plac Wilsona – Mickiewicza – plac Inwalidów – Mickiewicza – Andersa – Pl.Bankowy – Marszałkowska – rondo Dmowskiego – Marszałkowska – plac Konstytucji – Marszałkowska – plac Zbawiciela – Nowowiejska – plac Politechniki – Nowowiejska – Krzywickiego – Filtrowa – plac Narutowicza – Grójecka – aleja Krakowska	
16	Piaski (Muranowska) ↔ Miasteczko Wilanów; Broniewskiego - aleja Jana Pawła II - Stawki - Andersa - Pl.Bankowy - Marszałkowska - plac Zbawiciela - plac Unii Lubelskiej = Puławska - Goworka - Spacerowa - Belwederska - Sobieskiego - aleja Rzeczypospolitej	
17	Winnica (Metro Marymont)(Tarchomin) ↔ PKP Służewiec; Nowodwory - Światowida – Kuklińskiego – Most Skłodowskiej-Curie – Marymoncka – Słowackiego – Popiełuszki – aleja Jana Pawła II – rondo Zgrupowania AK „Radosław” – aleja Jana Pawła II – rondo ONZ – aleja Jana Pawła II – Chałubińskiego – aleja Niepodległości – Rakowiecka – Boboli – Wołoska – Marynarska	
18	Żerań FSO ↔ PKP Służewiec; Jagiellońska – Starzyńskiego – most Gdański – Słomińskiego – Międzyparkowa – Andersa – Pl.Bankowy – Marszałkowska – rondo Dmowskiego – Marszałkowska – plac Konstytucji – Marszałkowska – plac Zbawiciela – Marszałkowska – plac Unii Lubelskiej – Puławska – Woronicza – Wołoska – Marynarska	
19	Nowe Bemowo ↔ Stegny; Powstańców Śląskich - Broniewskiego - aleja Jana Pawła II – rondo Zgrupowania AK „Radosław” – aleja Jana Pawła II – rondo ONZ – aleja Jana Pawła II – Chałubińskiego – aleja Niepodległości – Rakowiecka - Puławska - Goworka - Spacerowa - Belwederska - Sobieskiego - Świętego Bonifacego	
20	Boernerowo ↔ Żerań FSO; Kaliskiego – Dywizjonu 303 – Obozowa – Młynarska – aleja Solidarności – most Śląsko-Dąbrowski – aleja Solidarności – plac Wileński – Targowa – Ratuszowa – Jagiellońska	
22	Wiatraczna ↔ Piaski; Grochowska – Zamoyskiego – aleja Zieleniecka – aleja Poniatowskiego – most Poniatowskiego – Aleje Jerozolimskie – rondo Dmowskiego – Aleje Jerozolimskie – plac Zawiszy – Towarowa – rondo Daszyńskiego – Towarowa – Okopowa – rondo Zgrupowania AK „Radosław” – aleja Jana Pawła II – Broniewskiego	
23	Czynszowa ↔ Nowe Bemowo; Czynszowa – Stalowa (Stalowa – Środkowa – plac Wileński – Czynszowa) – 11 Listopada – Targowa – Ratuszowa – Jagiellońska – aleja Solidarności – most Śląsko-Dąbrowski – aleja Solidarności – Młynarska – Obozowa – Dywizjonu 303 – Radiowa – Powstańców Śląskich	
24	Gocławek ↔ Nowe Bemowo; Grochowska – aleja Waszyngtona – aleja Poniatowskiego – most Poniatowskiego – Aleje Jerozolimskie – rondo Dmowskiego – Aleje Jerozolimskie – plac Zawiszy – Towarowa – rondo Daszyńskiego – Towarowa – Okopowa – aleja Solidarności – Młynarska – Obozowa – Dywizjonu 303 – Radiowa – Powstańców Śląskich	
25	Annopol ↔ Plac Narutowicza; Annopol – Rembielińska – Matki Teresy z Kalkuty – Odrowąża – rondo Żaba – 11 Listopada – Targowa – plac Wileński – Targowa – aleja Zieleniecka – aleja Poniatowskiego – most Poniatowskiego – Aleje Jerozolimskie – rondo Dmowskiego – Aleje Jerozolimskie – plac Zawiszy – Grójecka – Plac Narutowicza ONLY ON WEEKDAYS	
26	Metro Młociny ↔ Wiatraczna; Młociny – Powstańców Śląskich – Połczyńska – Wolska – aleja Solidarności – most Śląsko-Dąbrowski – aleja Solidarności – plac Wileński – Targowa – Zamoyskiego – Grochowska	
27	Cmentarz Wolski ↔ Metro Marymont; Wolska – aleja Solidarności – Okopowa – rondo Zgrupowania AK „Radosław” – aleja Jana Pawła II – Popiełuszki	
28	Dw. Wschodni (Kijowska) ↔ Osiedle Górczewska; Kijowska – Targowa – plac Wileński – Targowa – Ratuszowa – Jagiellońska – Starzyńskiego – most Gdański – Słomińskiego – rondo Zgrupowania AK „Radosław” – aleja Jana Pawła II – Broniewskiego – Powstańców Śląskich – Radiowa – Dywizjonu 303	
31	Metro Wierzbno ↔ PKP Służewiec; Puławska – Woronicza – Wołoska – Marynarska ONLY ON WEEKDAYS	
33	Kielecka ↔ Metro Młociny; Rakowiecka – aleja Niepodległości – Chałubińskiego – aleja Jana Pawła II – rondo ONZ – aleja Jana Pawła II – rondo Zgrupowania AK „Radosław” – aleja Jana Pawła II – Broniewskiego – Wólczyńska – Nocznickiego	
36	Metro Marymont ↔ Pl.Narutowicza; Filtrowa - Nowowiejska - Pl.Konstytucji - Marszałkowska - Pl.Bankowy - Andersa - Mickiewicza - Słowackiego TOURIST LINE (operates May-September)	
T	Pl.Narutowicza ↔ Pl.Narutowicza; Grójecka - plac Zawiszy - Aleje Jerozolimskie - Most Poniatowskiego - Aleje Jerozolimskie - Aleja Zieleniecka - Targowa - Aleja Solidarności - Most Śląsko-Dąbrowski - Aleja Solidarności - Pl.Bankowy - Marszałkowska - Andersa - Mickiewicza - Słowackiego TOURIST LINE (operates May-September)	

The standard headway is every 8 minutes during peak hours and every 12 minutes off-peak, but the trams on lines 1, 9, 17, 31, and 33 run every 4–6 minutes. Line 2 has the most frequent service with trams running every 2 minutes during peak hours.

== Tram loops/termini ==
Name	Image	date of opening	Lines
Annopol		1971	1 3 25
Banacha		1959	1 7 14
Boernerowo		1933	20
Cmentarz Wolski		1924	11 13 27
Czynszowa		1958	23
Dworzec Wschodni (Kijowska); Warszawa Wschodnia railway station		1866	28
Gocławek		1925	3 6 9 24
Kawęczyńska Bazylika		1925	7 13
Kielecka		1927	33
Marymont-Potok		1961	15
Metro Marymont; Marymont metro station		1935	17 27 36
Metro Młociny; Młociny metro station		1957	2 6 33 26
Metro Wierzbno; Wierzbno metro station		2006	31
Miasteczko Wilanów		2024	14 16
Muranowska		2024	16
Nowe Bemowo		1997	11 19 23 24
Osiedle Górczewska		1992	10 28
P+R Aleja Krakowska		1971	1 9 15
Piaski		1968	16 22
PKP Służewiec; Warszawa Służewiec railway station		1961	17 18 31
Plac Narutowicza		1921	25
Plac Starynkiewicza		1939	OUT OF USE
Sielce		2024	11
Stegny		2025	19
Tarchomin Kościelny		2014	17
Wiatraczna		1949	9 22 26
Winnica		2021	2 17
Wyścigi		1938	4 10
Żerań FSO		1953	18 20
Żerań Wschodni		1952	1 4

== See also ==
- List of town tramway systems in Poland
- Warsaw Metro
- Zarząd Transportu Miejskiego w Warszawie
