= Gabriel Narutowicz Memorial =

Monument in Warsaw, Poland

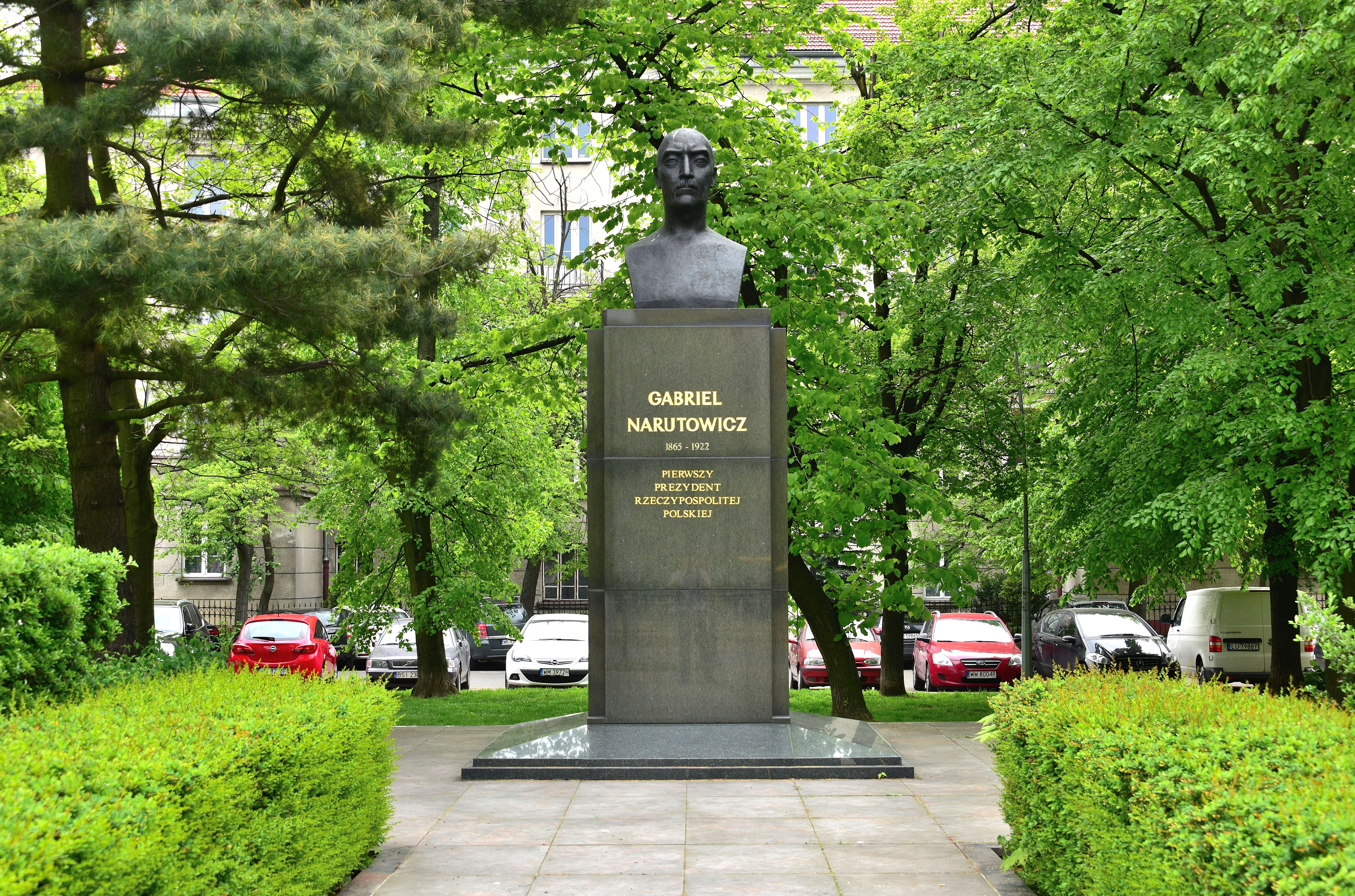
- The monument in 2017.
- Interactive map of Gabriel Narutowicz Memorial
- Location: Narutowicz Square, Ochota, Warsaw, Poland
- Coordinates: 52°13′07.36″N 20°59′06.64″E
- Designer: Edward Wittig
- Type: Bust
- Material: Bronze (bust); Granite (pedestal)
- Opening date: 9 December 2002
- Dedicated to: Gabriel Narutowicz

The Gabriel Narutowicz Memorial (Polish: Pomnik Gabriela Narutowicza) is a bronze bust sculpture in Warsaw, Poland, placed at the Narutowicz Square within the Old Ochota neighbourhood. It is dedicated to Gabriel Narutowicz, an engineer and politicinan, who in 1922, was elected the first President of Poland, before being assassinated five days after taking office. It was unveiled on 9 December 2002, and was a copy of a sculpture by Edward Wittig.

== History ==
The monument was first proposed by local Alliance of Democrats party members from Ochota in 1984.

On 5 December 1992, in the location of the future monument at the Narutowicz Square was placed a sandstone plaque, with a Polish inscription that read "Na tym skwerze zostanie wzniesiony pomnik prezydenta Gabriela Narutowicza". It translated to "At this square will be erected a monument dedicated to president Gabriel Narutowicz". It was originally envisioned as a statue designed by Tadeusz Łodziana, however it remained unreleased due to the lack of necessary funds. Instead, on 9 December 2002, there was unveiled a bronze bust placed on granite pedestal. It was a twice enlarged copy of a sculpture by Edward Wittig, from the collection of the Warsaw University of Technology. During the ceremony, actor Krzysztof Kolberger read the oath Narutowicz made during his inauguration.

In 2022, it was announced that the monument will be moved to a different location at the square, due to the constriction of a tramline there.

== Design ==
The monument consists of a large bronze placed on a pedestal made from polished granite. It features a Polish inscription, which reads: "Gabriel Narutowicz; 1865–1922; Pierwszy Prezydent Rzeczpospolitej Polskiej". It translates to "Gabriel Narutowicz; 1865–1922; The First President of the Republic of Poland".
