= HCP 123N =

Tram produced by H. Cegielski – Rail Vehicles Factory

123N
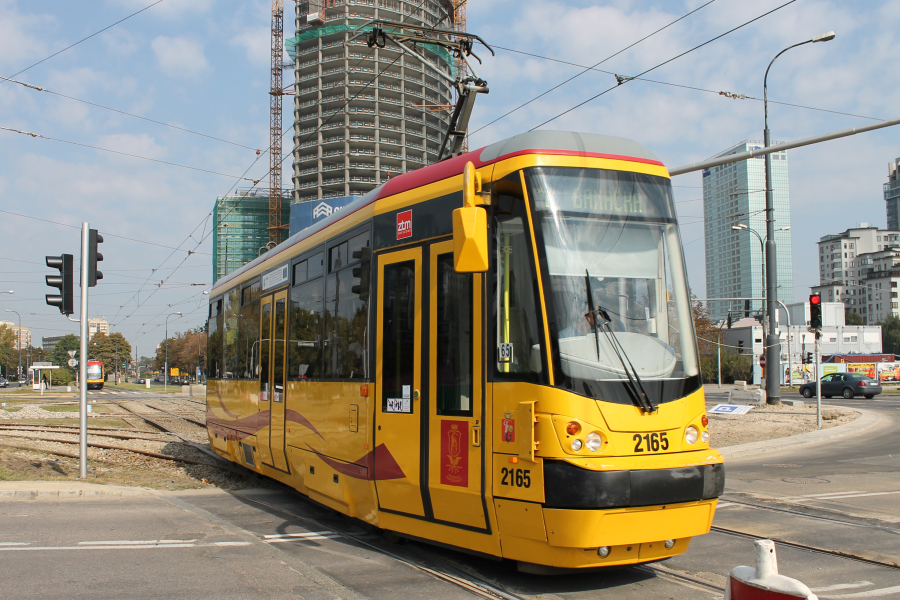
- Tram type 123N
- Manufacturer: H. Cegielski
- Assembly: Poznań, Poland
- Constructed: 2006–2007
- Number built: 30
- Capacity: 97

Specifications
- Train length: 14,300 mm (560 in)
- Width: 2,354 mm (92.7 in)
- Height: 3,680 mm (145 in)
- Floor height: 900 mm (35 in)
- Articulated sections: 1
- Maximum speed: 70 km/h (43 mph)
- Weight: 18,200 t (40,100,000 lb)

HCP 123N (also known as hipolit, named after Hipolit Cegielski – the founder of H. Cegielski – Poznań) is a high-floor, single-section tram produced by H. Cegielski – Rail Vehicles Factory in Poznań. Between 2006 and 2007, 30 vehicles of this type were built and delivered for Warsaw.

== History ==
Starting in 2000, Tramwaje Warszawskie repeatedly announced tenders for the supply of low-floor trams, but none were successfully concluded. In 2004, unable to acquire low-floor vehicles, the operator decided to purchase 30 single-section trams that would be technically and dimensionally similar to the existing Konstal 105N2k/2000 vehicles. The decision to purchase high-floor trams was also influenced by the need for a quick and low-cost replacement of a small batch of Konstal 13N trams.

=== Tenders ===
The first two tenders, announced in July and November 2004, were cancelled. The third tender was announced on 16 December 2004, with bids opened a month later. On 27 January 2005, the tender was awarded to the Poznań-based H. Cegielski – Poznań, but due to appeals from Pesa and Łódź, the contract was not signed until July 2005.

=== Production ===
Initially, it was planned to launch the prototype of the new vehicle between March and April 2006. However, due to delays, the date for the first tests was postponed to September 2006. This deadline was also missed, as modifications were required on the already completed tram.On 31 October 2006, the first Hipolit finally left the H. Cegielski factory and began testing at the Forteczna tram depot in Poznań the same day. During the night of 14 to 15 November 2006, the tram went out for its first test run on the streets of Poznań.By the end of 2006, a total of three vehicles had been produced, with the remaining 27 units manufactured in 2007.Deliveries were initially scheduled to begin in 2006; however, due to technical and formal issues, the first vehicles arrived in Warsaw with a five-month delay. All trams were delivered between January and October 2007.

== Construction ==
The body of the tram is an open construction made of stainless steel. The front end is made from plastic profiles, and energy-absorbing buffers are installed on the front structure. All windows are bonded in place, featuring a panoramic front window. The trams are equipped with three pairs of sliding-tilting doors. One of the wings is accessible only to the driver and leads to the driver's cabin. Light display boards are mounted in the front and rear windows of the tram.

=== Interior ===
In the passenger area, there are 20 upholstered seats made from soft fabric, designed to be vandal-resistant and arranged facing the direction of travel. A free space is left near the middle doors for passenger convenience.The ventilation of the passenger compartment is achieved through four roof hatches and sliding windows in the side panes. Lighting is provided by fluorescent tubes arranged in panels that create two lines running along the tram's ceiling. Heating is supplied by five heating units located under the seats. The passenger information system consists of speakers that announce the next stops, as well as large and small internal displays showing, among other things, the upcoming stops and possible transfers.All 123N trams are equipped with a driver's cabin, allowing them to operate both in trains and singly. The cabin includes a control panel and an air conditioning unit similar to those found in Konstal 105N2k/2000 trams.

=== Bogies ===
The 123N tram is based on two two-axle drive bogies of type 14NN. The rigid bogie frame is shaped like an "H" with two cross beams, each supporting one motor and gearbox. A bolster beam resting on springs is located in the center of the bogie, and grease boxes are mounted on the axles. The bogies are equipped with two rail brakes and two release mechanisms, but they lack a wheel flange lubrication system. The first delivered trams were also not fitted with sandboxes, which were later added by the operator. Subsequent units were factory-fitted with these devices.

The axle spacing in the truck is 1,900 mm, while the pivot pin spacing is 6,000 mm. The diameter of new and worn wheels is 654 mm and 605 mm, respectively.

=== Drive system ===
Hipolit trams are powered by direct current drawn from the overhead line via an OTK2 current collector located on the roof. The drive is provided by four LTd-220 DC motors, each rated at 41.5 kW. An impulse start system based on GTO thyristors is employed.Auxiliary circuits are powered by a voltage converter located in the compartment in the middle of the vehicle.

== Operation ==
Country	City	Operator	Number of Trams	Side Numbers	Years of Delivery	Sources
Poland	Warsaw	Tramwaje Warszawskie	30	2136 ÷ 2165	2007	[1]

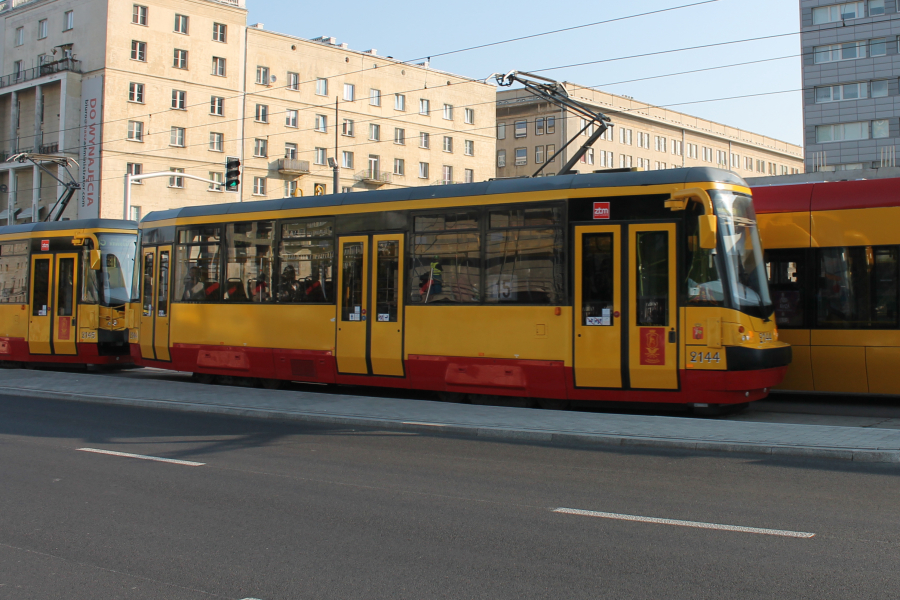
Hipolit in new livery on Marszałkowska Street in Warsaw

On 13 January 2007, the first two Hipolit trams of type 123N arrived in Warsaw. They received side numbers 2136 and 2137 and were assigned to the Wola tram depot. Over the next few days, the vehicles were prepared for their first test ride, which took place on 18 January 2007. The trams left the depot as single units and were later coupled into a two-car set at Narutowicz Square. On 23 January 2007, after successful trials in both single and coupled traction, the trams were officially entered into service, and the next day, the first two-car set debuted on line 24.

The remaining trams received consecutive numbers up to 2165, were also paired, and assigned to the Wola tram depot. Until the completion of deliveries in October 2007, the two-car sets operated on all lines serviced by the home depot. For the next four years, due to European Union requirements, the vehicles were strictly assigned to the modernized route along Jerusalem Avenue and to lines 9 and 25. In 2011, the situation began to change, and the 123N trams once again started servicing other lines.
