= Holy Cross Bridge =

Holy Cross Bridge Most Świętokrzyski
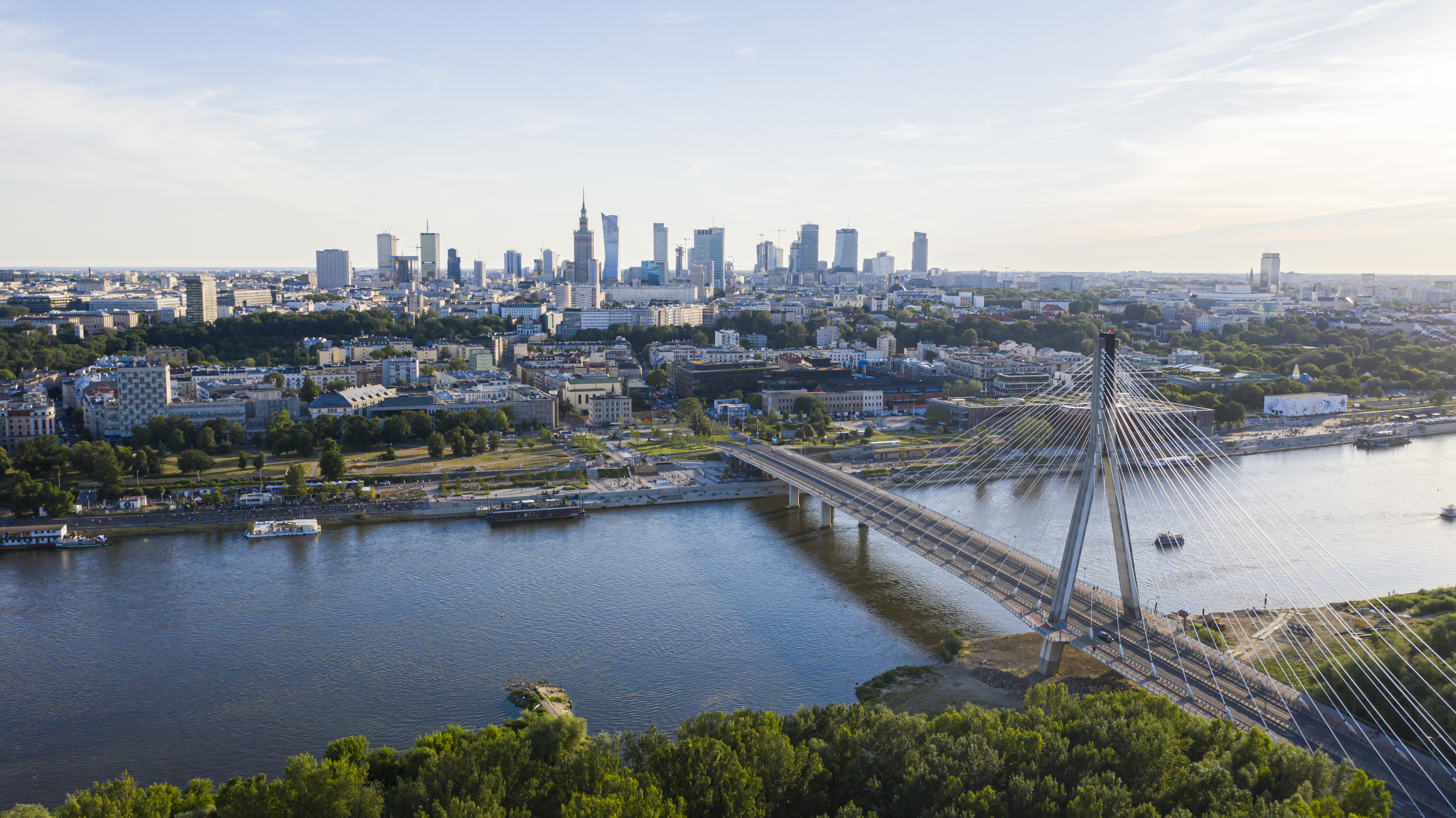
- Świętokrzyski Bridge in September 2017
- Coordinates: 52°14′31″N 21°02′06″E
- Carries: Vehicles, Pedestrian, Bicycles
- Crosses: Vistula River
- Locale: Warsaw, Poland
- Maintained by: Trasa Świętokrzyska Sp. z o.o.
- Preceded by: Cross-City Bridge

Characteristics
- Total length: 479 metres (1,572 ft)
- Width: 30 metres (98 ft)
- Longest span: 180 metres (590 ft)

History
- Construction start: 5 October 1998
- Construction end: 5 October 2000
- Opened: 6 October 2000

Location
- Interactive map of Holy Cross Bridge

The Holy Cross Bridge (Polish: most Świętokrzyski) is a bridge over the Vistula river in Warsaw, Poland linking Powiśle neighborhood with Praga Północ district.

It is a cable-stayed bridge, 479 m long, with two lanes for vehicles, a pavement and a cycle path each way. The single tower, 90 m high, located on the right (eastern) river bank, has 48 cables attached supporting the deck. Near the left (western) bank the bridge is supported by two piers. The bridge was opened on 6 October 2000 after two years' construction.

The bridge's name comes from the Świętokrzyska Street, which forms part of the access route from the city center.

According to the data from Zarząd Dróg Miejskich (Capital City Road Authority) in 2018, on average 23,418 vehicles passed the Świętokrzyski Bridge daily.

== History ==
The construction of the bridge was tied to plans for intensive development of the Port Praski area, co-financed by the company Elektrim, as well as the planned university campus in Powiśle.

The cornerstone was laid on September 28, 1998. The bridge was built by Mostostal Warszawa S.A. and designed by Andrzej Czapski and Pekka Pulkkinen, with architectural detailing by Tadeusz Korszyński.

Construction lasted two years, with a total cost of approximately 160 million złoty.

The bridge took over the traffic load from the dismantled Syrena Bridge. After two lanes of the Śląsko-Dąbrowski Bridge were closed to vehicular traffic in 2007, the Świętokrzyski Bridge's importance increased significantly. It now connects Warsaw's city center with Praga and is considered the most cyclist-friendly bridge in the city.

In 2005, plans were proposed to build a tram line across the bridge, connecting the Targowa–Kijowska intersection in Praga with Rondo ONZ in the city center. This would have required reducing the number of traffic lanes, possibly leaving one lane per direction, while keeping the bike paths and sidewalks intact. However, the project was abandoned after work began on the second metro line, which follows a similar route.

== Trivia ==
- The Holy Cross Bridge is the fifth-longest cable-stayed bridge in Poland.
- On August 31, 2001, the “Most Beautiful Rock for Peace” concert by Tangerine Dream took place on the bridge (specifically on the abutment of the former Syrena Bridge). The event featured a light show and fireworks illuminating the bridge and drew about 6,000 Warsaw residents. The concert concluded with a performance by Kasia Stankiewicz.
- In 2009, media reports claimed that the name and image of the bridge were legally protected, implying that filming it required license fees. In reality, only the use of a specific trademark graphic filed in the registration documents is protected; the real appearance of the bridge (e.g., in photos or films) is not restricted.
- The bridge is mentioned in the song “Warszawska Plaża” by the band Płyny.
- One of the key scenes in the film “Nigdy w życiu!” takes place on the bridge — during a rainstorm, the main character's car runs out of fuel, and as she walks soaked through the rain, she meets her beloved, with Edyta Bartosiewicz's song “Opowieść” playing in the background.
- The bridge also appears in the music video by Ich Troje for the song "Razem, a jednak osobno", from their album Ad. 4.

== Gallery ==
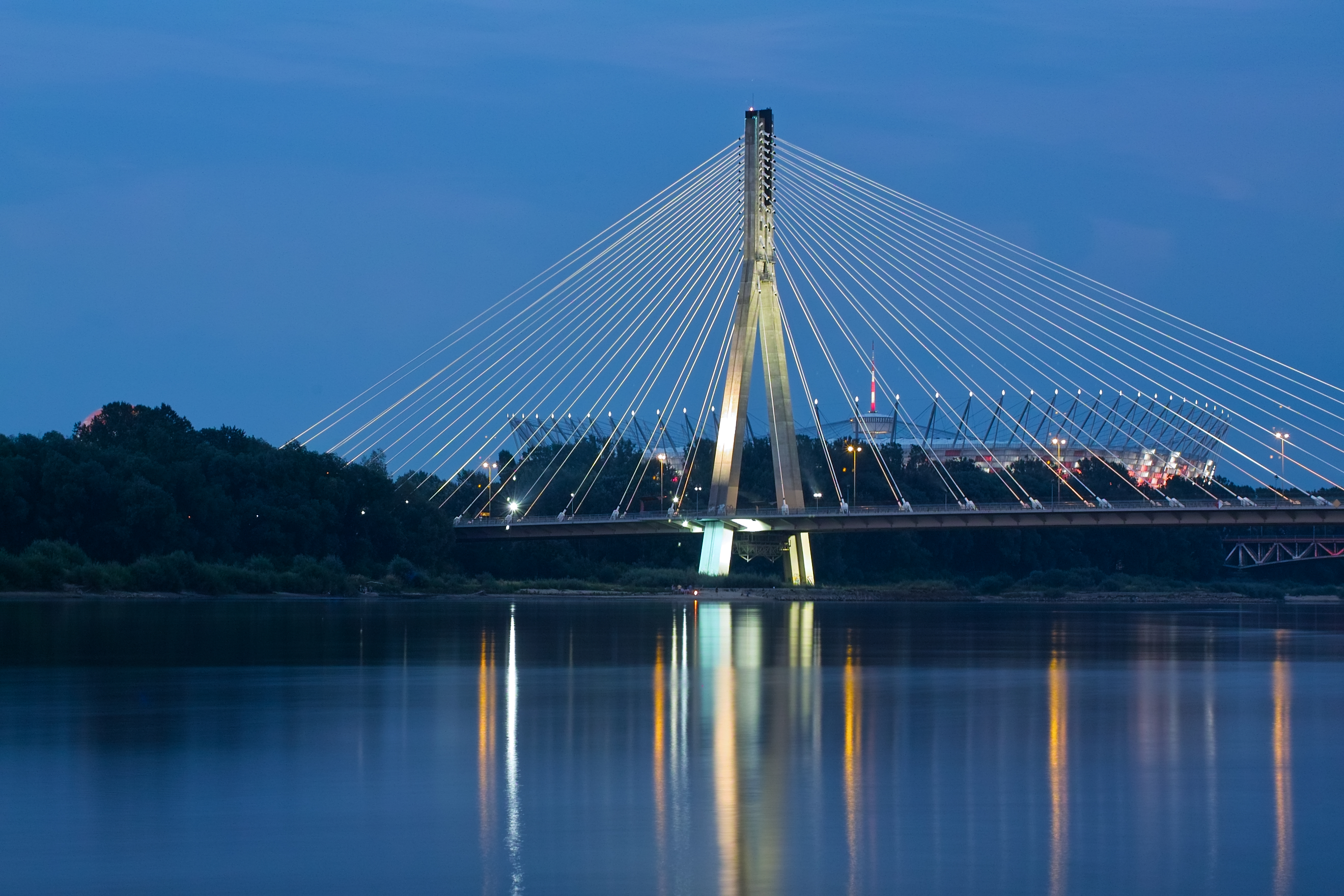
Świętokrzyski Bridge

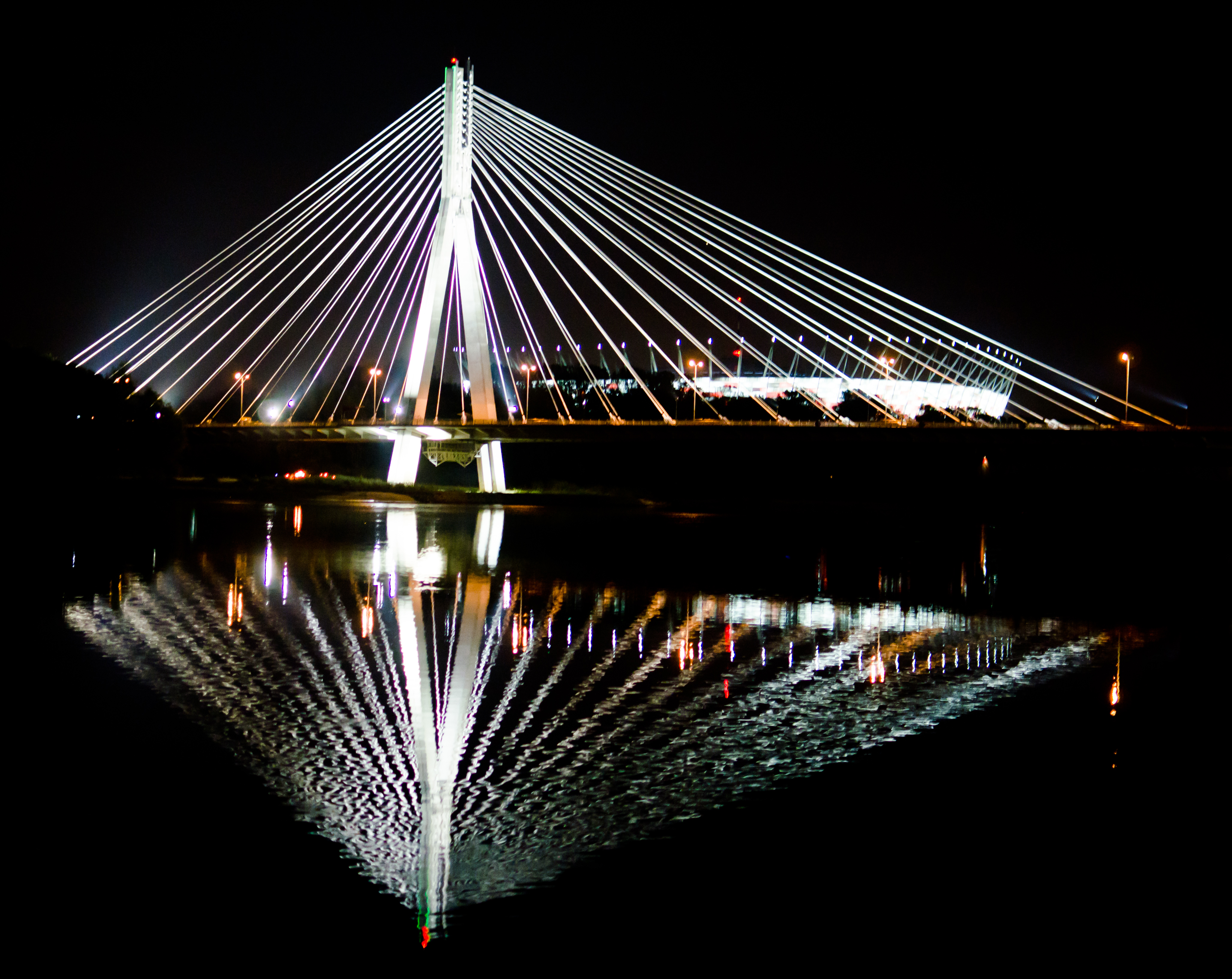
Bridge at night

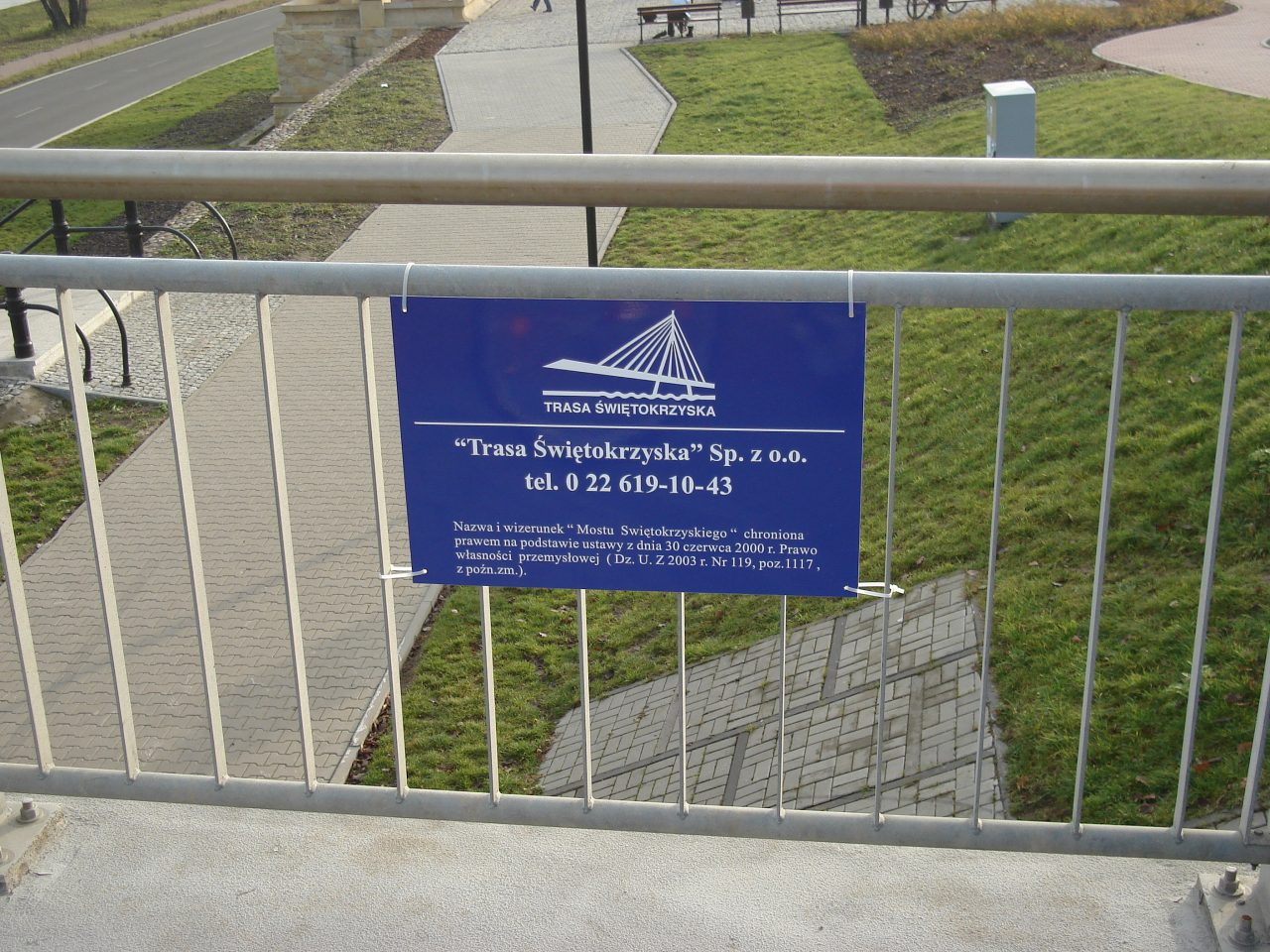
Information board

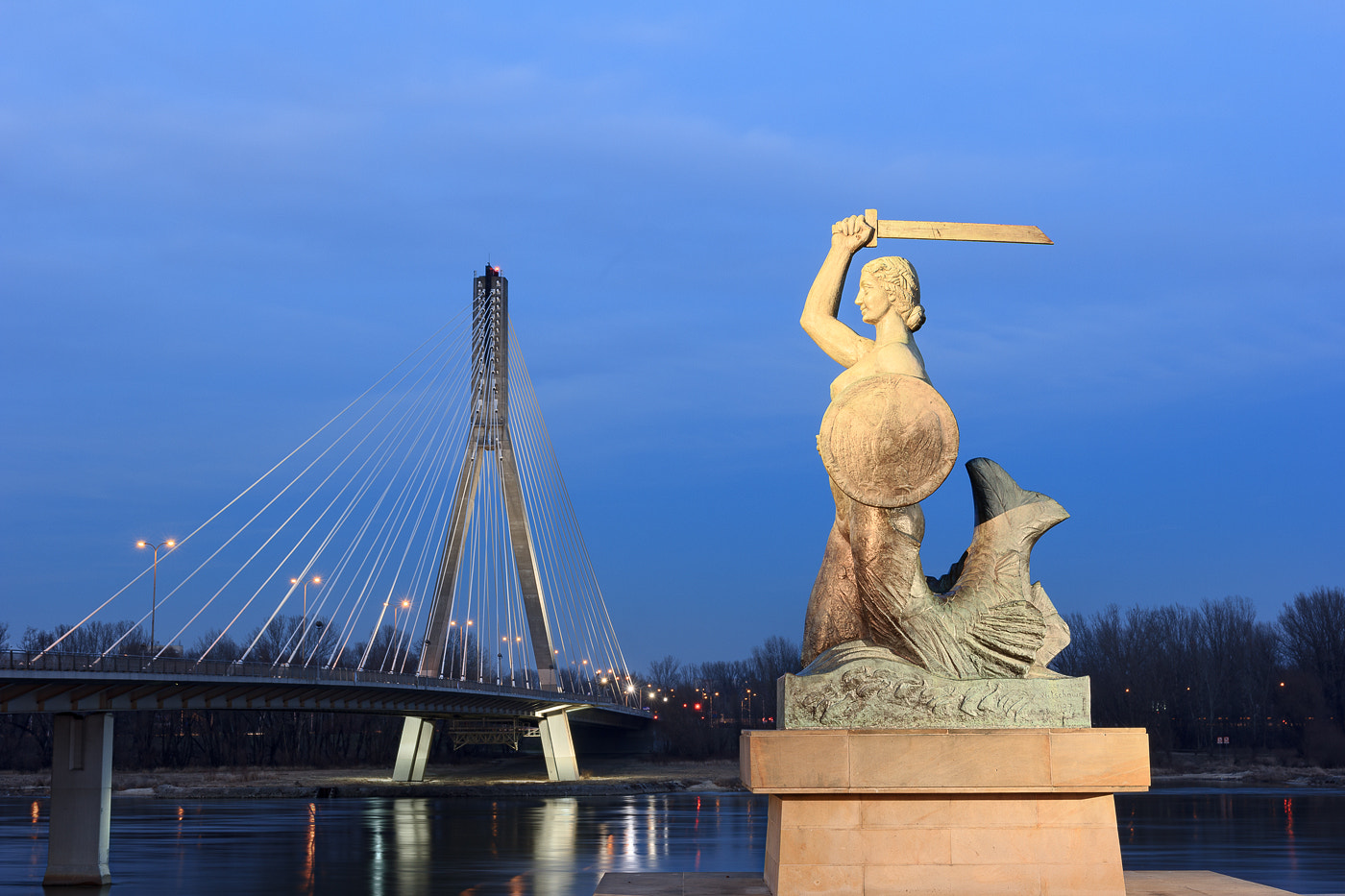
Mermaid of Warsaw in front of the bridge

== See also ==
- Łazienkowski Bridge
- Poniatowski Bridge
