= Gdańsk Bridge =

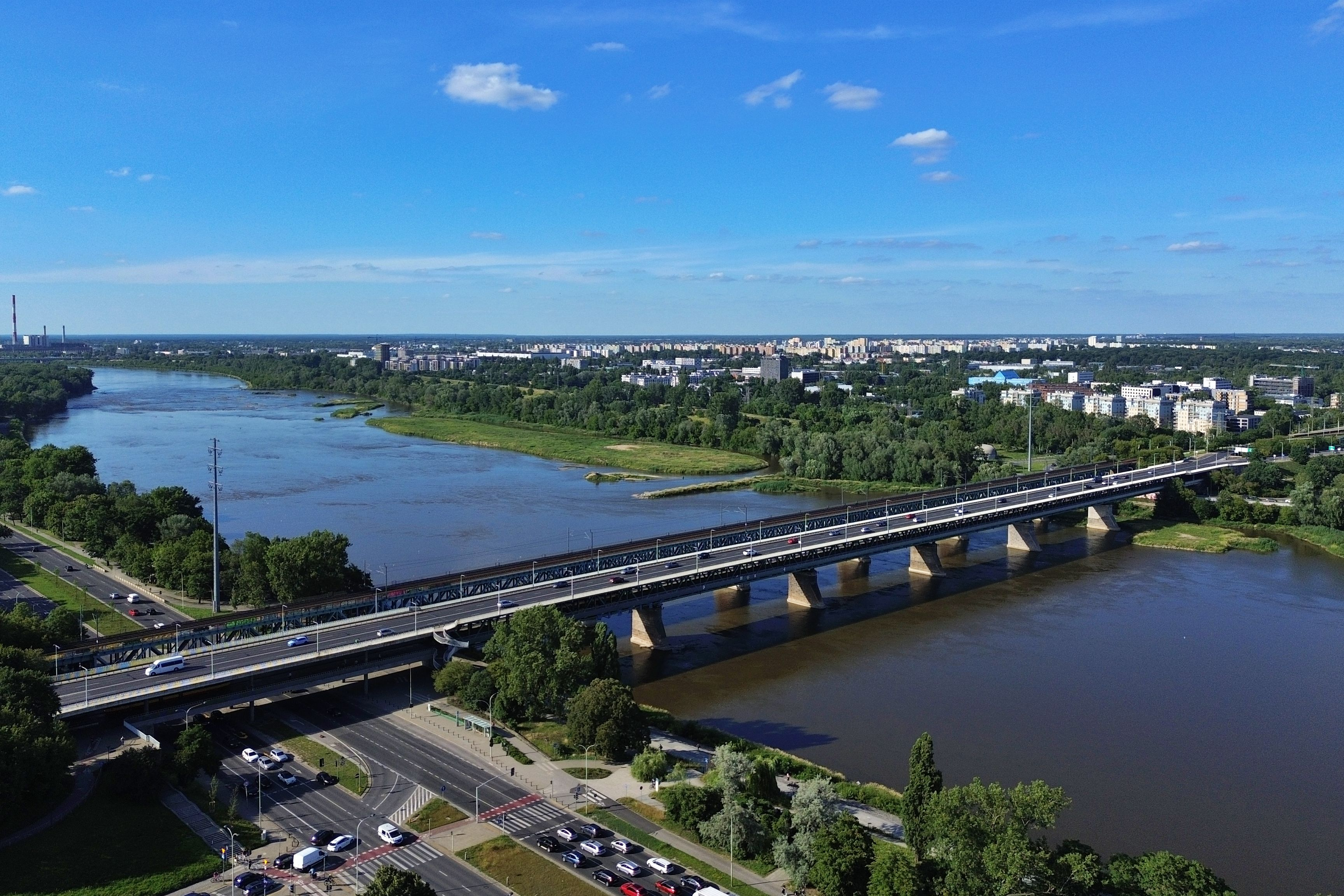
- The Gdańsk Bridge
- Coordinates: 52°15′40″N 21°00′38″E
- Carries: motor vehicles, trams
- Crosses: Vistula River
- Locale: Warsaw, Poland
- Preceded by: Silesian–Dąbrowa Bridge
- Followed by: Citadel Rail Bridge

Characteristics
- Total length: 406.5 metres (1,334 ft)
- Width: 17 metres (56 ft)
- No. of spans: 6

History
- Opened: 31 July 1959

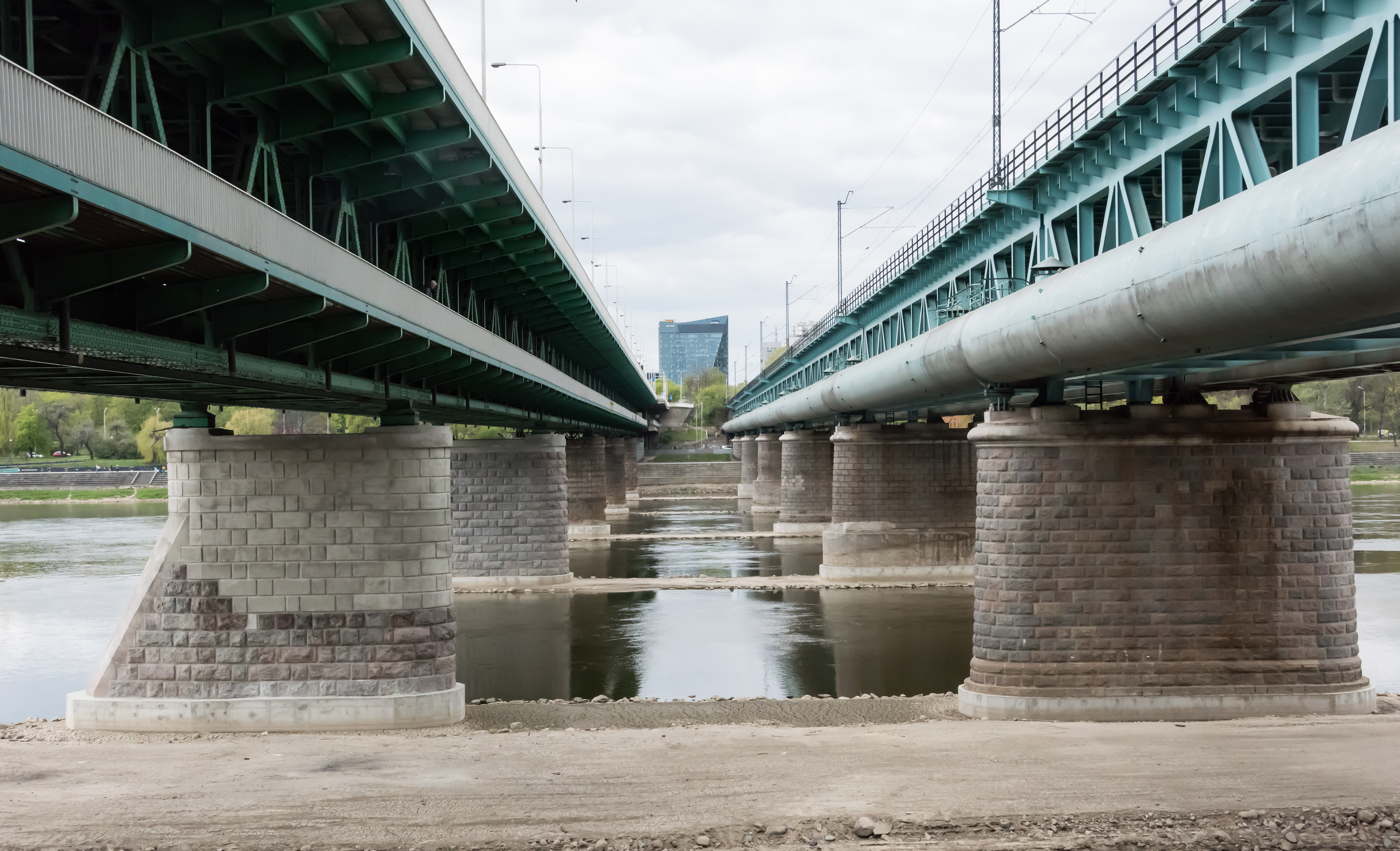
The historic pillars of the Citadel Bridge (left) are a foundation for the Gdański Bridge

The Gdańsk Bridge (Polish: Most Gdański) is a six-span steel truss bridge, 406.5 m long and 17 m wide, across the Vistula in Warsaw, Poland.

It opened on 31 July 1959 after three years of construction. It has two decks: the upper deck carries a four-lane road with sidewalks, while the lower one has two tram tracks, a cycle lane and a footpath.

The bridge was built upon the supports of the Citadel Rail Bridge which had been destroyed during World War II.

In 1997-1998 the bridge underwent reconstruction. It was painted green and the lower level was fitted with colour bulbs for illumination at night.

== Description ==
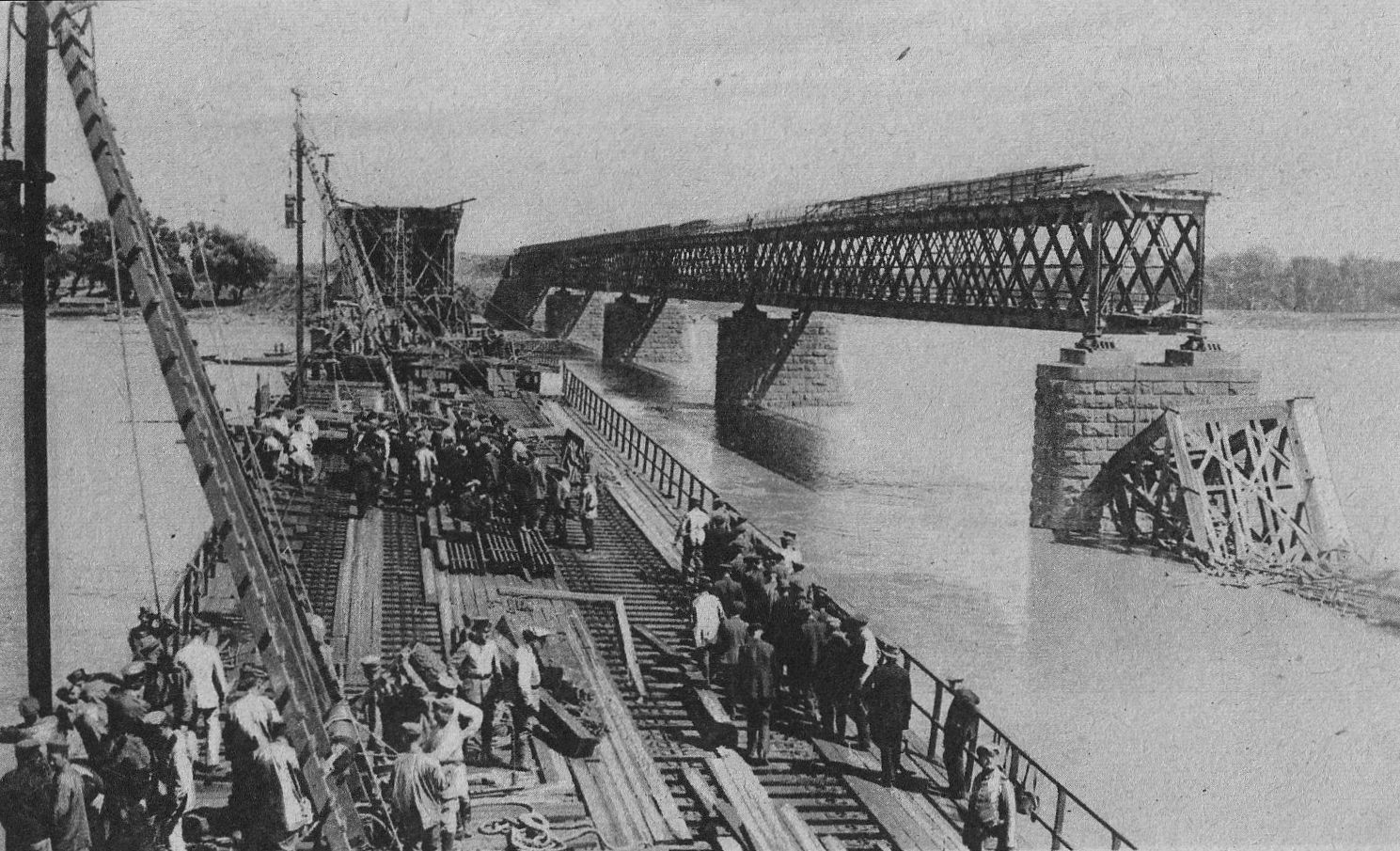
The bridge under the Citadel (on the right), destroyed in 1915, whose pillars, after another destruction of the crossing in 1944, were used to build the Gdański Bridge

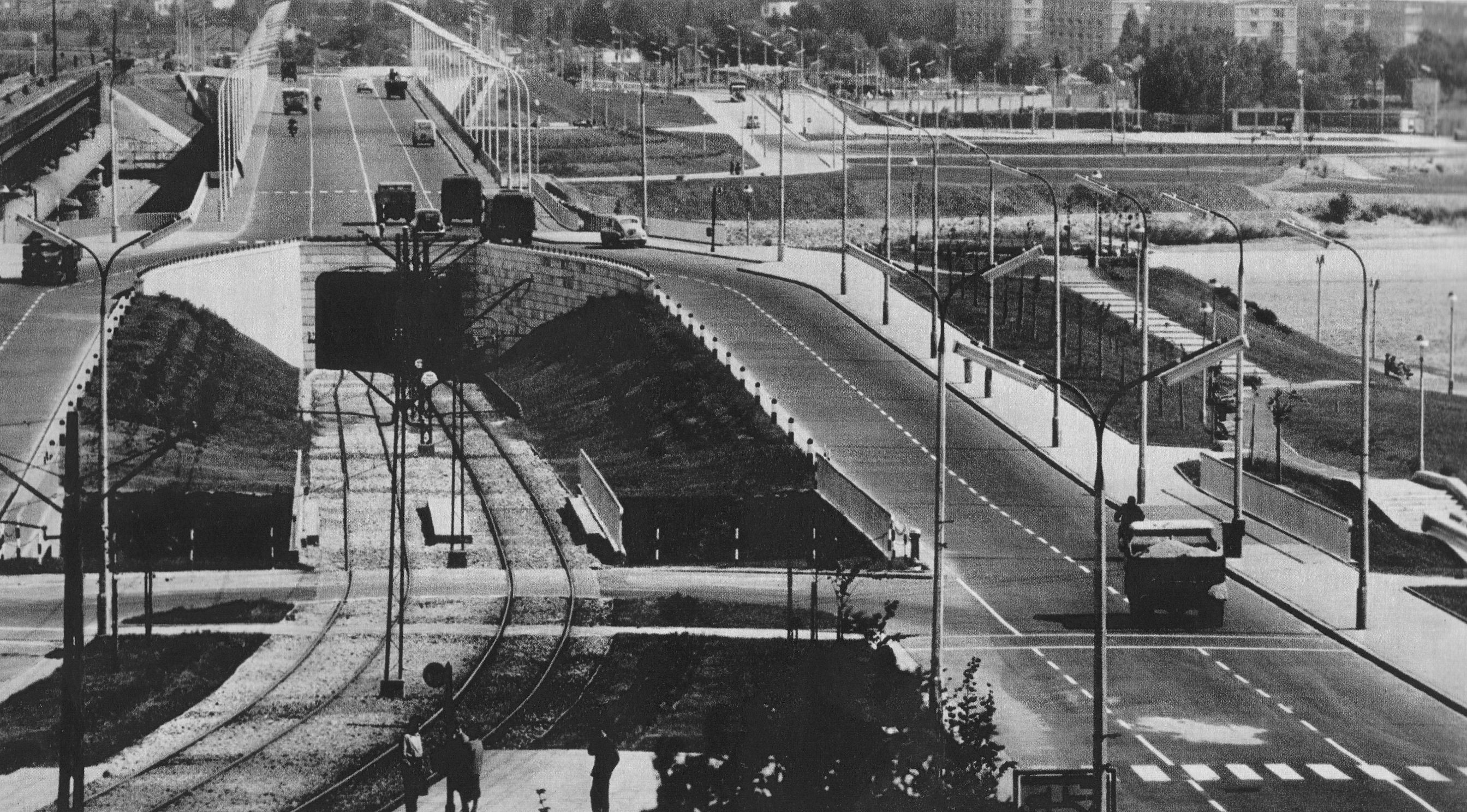
Entrance to the bridge, 1960s

The bridge was built between 1957 and 1959, designed by Janusz Ratyński. It formed part of the Stefan Starzyński Bridge Route (Trasa Mostowa im. Stefana Starzyńskiego), a name granted by resolution of the National Council of the Capital City of Warsaw on September 27, 1957.

It was constructed on the piers of the previous bridge, which had been blown up by the Germans on September 13, 1944. That earlier bridge, built between 1873 and 1875, originally served rail and road traffic, and later became road-only, known as the bridge by the Citadel. The new structure retained the two-level design of the former bridge built on the same site.

Numerous names were proposed for the newly built crossing, including Peace Bridge (Most Pokoju), Fifteenth Anniversary Bridge (Most Piętnastolecia), Freedom Bridge (Most Wolności), Traugutt Bridge (Most imienia Traugutta), Warsaw Heroes Bridge (Most Bohaterów Warszawy), and Citadel Bridge (Most pod Cytadelą). Ultimately, the name Gdański Bridge (Most Gdański) was chosen and officially given on July 21, 1959, the day the entire route was opened.

The entire crossing consists of:

- a two-level access viaduct over Wybrzeże Helskie Street (length 44.76 m),
- the main two-level bridge (length 406.53 m),
- and a two-level viaduct over Wybrzeże Gdańskie Street (length 85.17 m).

The main load-bearing structure is a six-span steel truss, while the approach viaducts are reinforced concrete frames built with prestressed technology. They were designed by Stefan Piwoński and Witold Witkowski.

The lower level carries tram tracks laid on oak sleepers, sidewalks, and a bicycle path (on the southern side), while the upper level has a four-lane roadway and sidewalks.

The total construction cost of the Gdański Bridge amounted to 25 million złotys.

Today, the bridge forms part of Warsaw’s inner-city ring road, connecting Słomińskiego Street on the left bank with Starzyńskiego Street on the right bank. Like the Holy Cross Bridge, it primarily serves local traffic rather than transit, due to the lack of extensive interchanges on both sides of the Vistula River. Between 2005 and 2007, a major reconstruction of Starzyński Roundabout was carried out (including the construction of flyovers), one of several projects aimed at improving traffic flow along the ring road.

During the 1990s, the bridge underwent renovation: it was painted green, and its lower level was illuminated with colorful neon lights. A characteristic feature of the lower level remains its wooden track sleepers, which are planned to be replaced in the future.

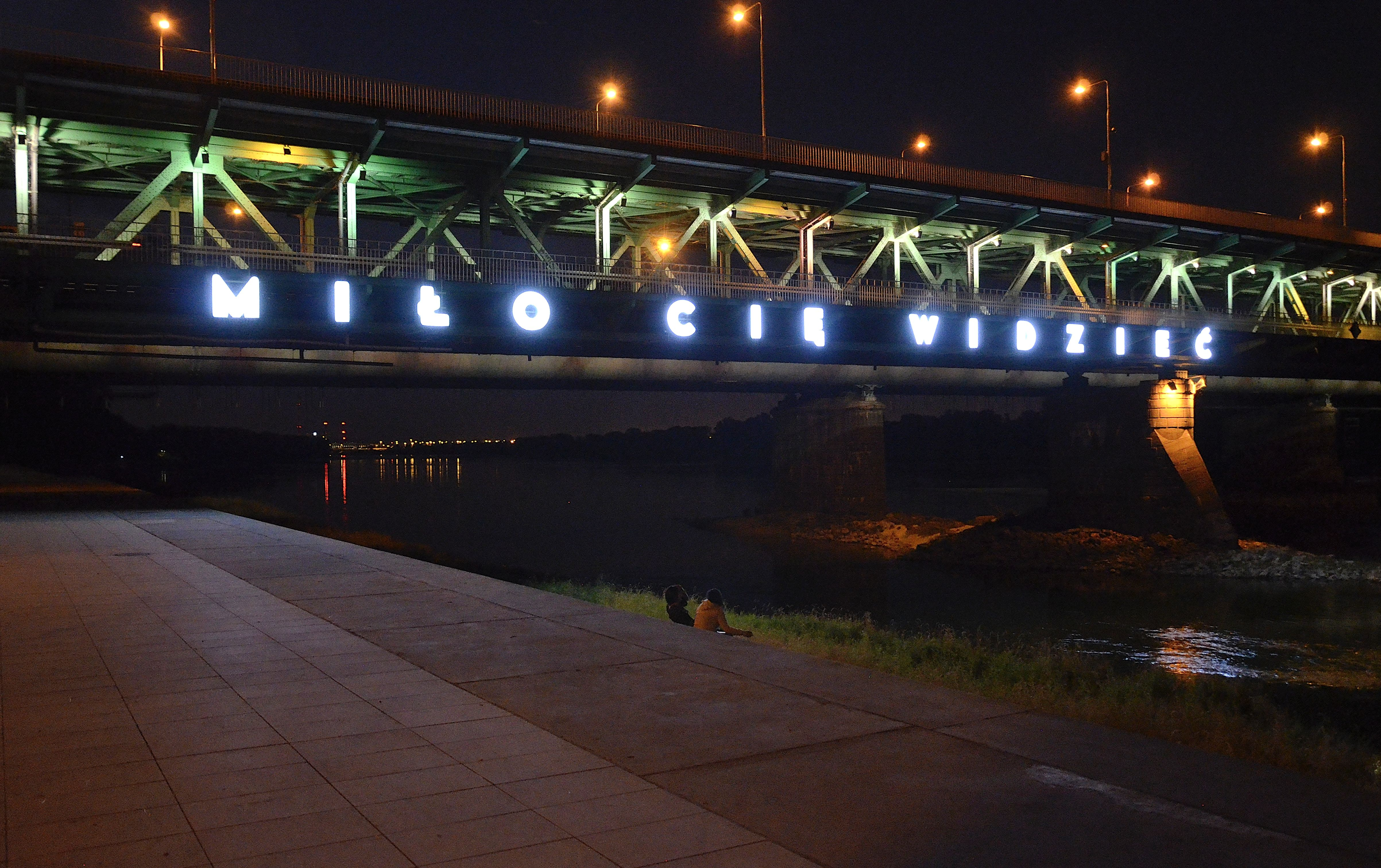
Neon sign by Mariusz Lewczyk

In June 2014, on the southern side of the bridge (closer to the city center), a neon sign reading “Miło cię widzieć” (“Nice to see you”) by Mariusz Lewczyk was installed. The design had won the 2013 “Neon for Warsaw” competition.

== See also ==
- Holy Cross Bridge
- Łazienki Bridge
- Poniatowski Bridge
- Siekierki Bridge
- Silesian–Dąbrowa Bridge
