= Cross-City Bridge =

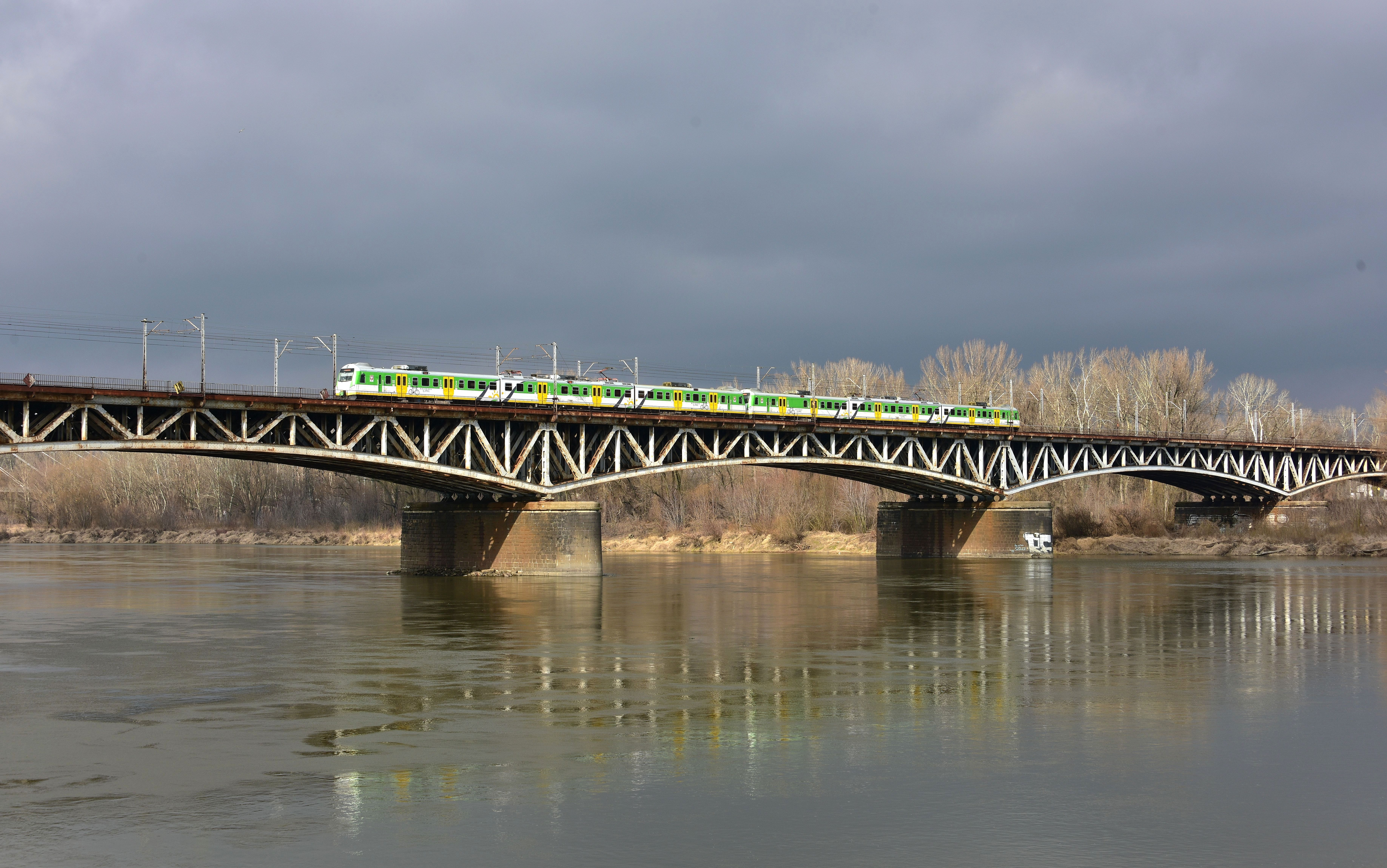
- The Cross-City Bridge
- Coordinates: 52°14′19.8″N 21°2′15″E
- Carried: Rail transport
- Crossed: Vistula River
- Locale: Warsaw
- Preceded by: Poniatowski Bridge
- Followed by: Holy Cross Bridge

Characteristics
- Total length: 445 m
- Width: 9 m
- No. of spans: 5

History
- Construction start: 1921
- Opened: 1931
- Collapsed: 13 September 1944

The Cross-City Bridge (Polish: Most średnicowy) is a rail bridge over the Vistula River in Warsaw, north of the Poniatowski Bridge. It forms a part of the Warsaw Cross-City Line and was originally built between 1921 and 1931 to connect the (now defunct) Warszawa Główna railway station and what is now the Warszawa Wschodnia railway station.

== History and description ==
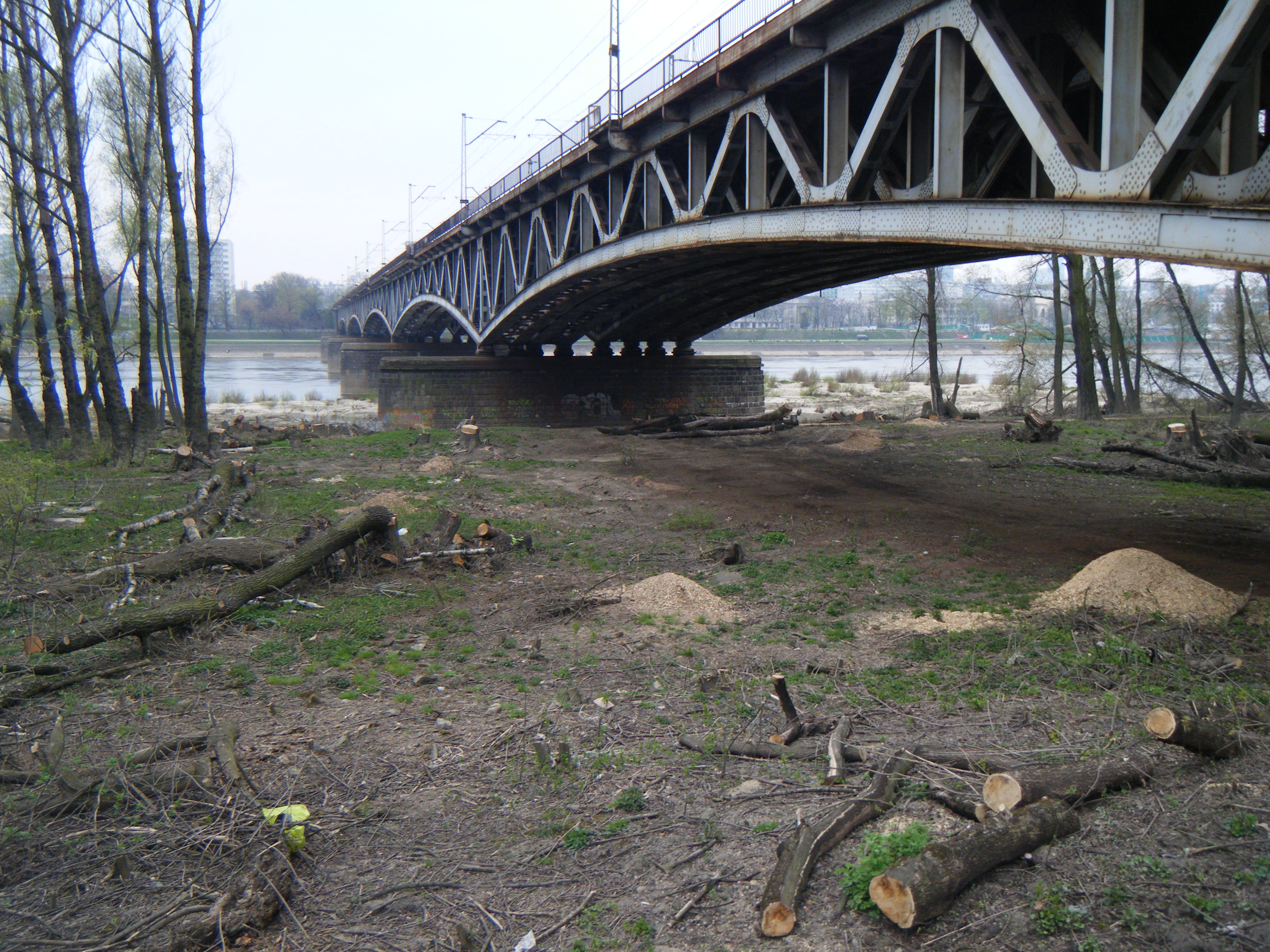
View from the right bank of the Vistula River (2011)

The bridge was designed by Aleksander Pstrokoński. Construction began in 1921 and extended more than 10 years because of a financial crisis, effecting the Polish Building Society (Polskie Towarzystwo Budowlane). Foundations were pneumatically positioned with a metal structure above the pillars. The bridge consisted of four spans of over 90 m, with high arches.

On 13 September 1944, the bridge was blown up by retreating German troops.

Between 1945 and 1949 the bridge was rebuilt in a considerably modified form, with smaller pillars and different design methodology, and was opened to rail traffic on 23 June 1949.

A twin bridge was built in the 1960s shortly before the start of the construction of the Warszawa Centralna railway station.

Currently, the bridge gives the impression of being monolithic, although it actually consists of two independent platforms supported on a common pillars. The four rail tracks link the main railway stations in Warsaw. The two tracks on the north side are designed for long-distance traffic, while the other two are usually used by commuter trains.

The bridge has five spans and length of 445 m.

== Bibliography ==
- Encyklopedia Warszawy (1994 ISBN 83-01-08836-2) (in Polish).
