= Annopol, Warsaw =

Neighborhood in Warsaw, Poland

Coordinates: 52°18′32″N 21°01′01″E

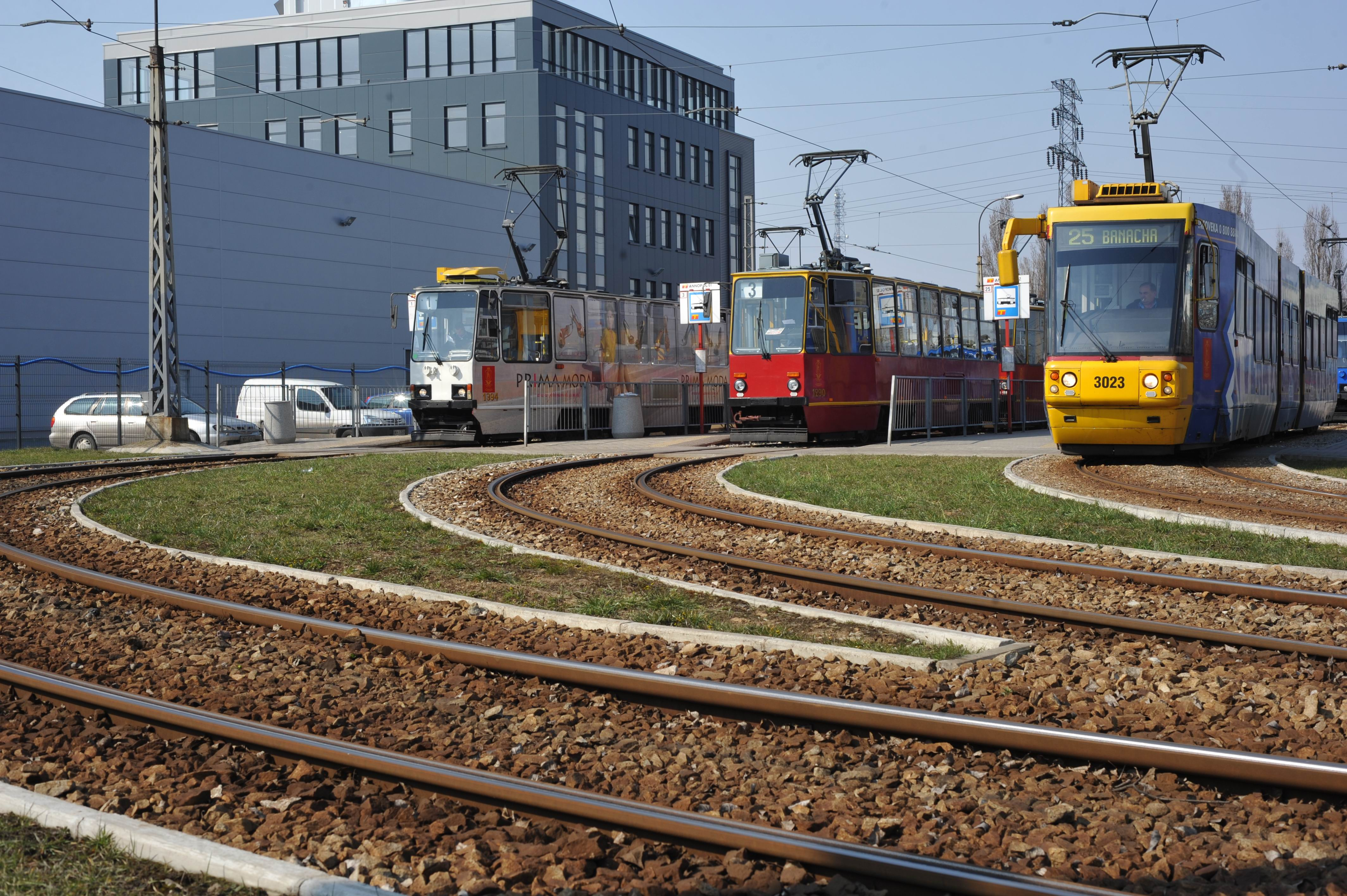
Annopol

Annopol is a neighborhood of Białołęka district in Warsaw, Poland. For the residents of Warsaw, Annopol is known for being a tram terminus, with several Warsaw tram lines stopping here, and it is also an industrial centre.

== History ==
In the second half of the 19th century, on the territory of the Marywil farm, a fortress was erected here, known as Fort XIV Marywil or Pelcowizna. The task of this fort was, among others, to cover of the route of the Vistula River. By order of January 31, 1909, the fort was liquidated and eventually destroyed in the summer of 1913. Construction of a canal began to the north of the fort. A housing estate for construction workers of the canal was built in 1927 and the area became known as Annopol. The canal, completed after World War II, was named the Żerański Canal (Kanał Żerański). The area was developed for industrial purposes, with the canal able to accommodate for 1350-ton barges. The first Warsaw CHP plant, a concrete elements factory and a cement mill were built in the 1950s. There are now warehouses and office complexes in Żerań Park and Żerań Park II, and Coca-Cola has its Polish headquarters on Annapol Street.

In 1951, together with other villages, Annopol was incorporated into Warsaw as part of the Praga-Północ district. Today it is located in the Białołęka district.
