= Gocławek =

Coordinates: 52°14′17″N 21°07′10″E

- Neighbourhood
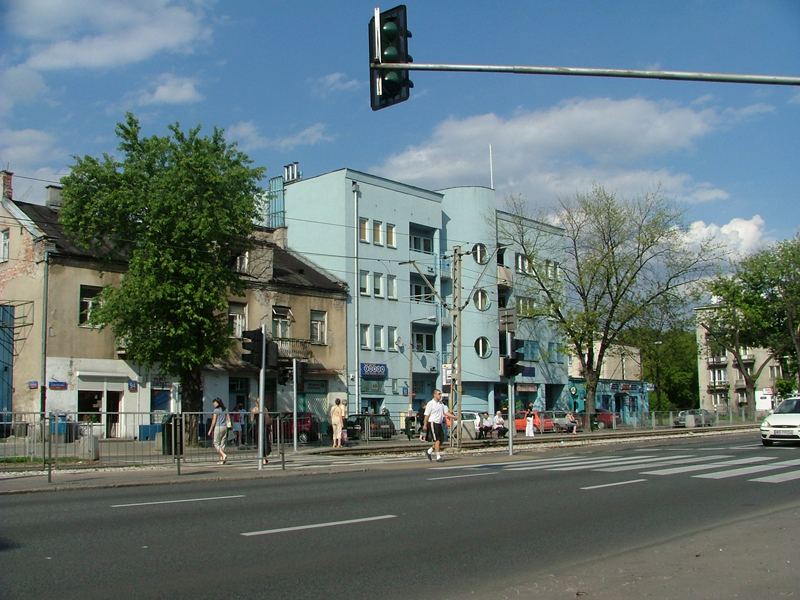
- Grochowska Street

- Location of Gocławek in the District of Praga Południe
- Country: Poland
- Voivodeship: Masovian
- City: Warsaw
- District/Borough: Praga Południe
- Time zone: UTC+1 (CET)
  - Summer (DST): UTC+2 (CEST)

Gocławek is an officially designated neighbourhood within the Warsaw district of Praga Południe. It is located in the north-eastern part of Praga-Południe and is roughly defined as the area between Szasarow Street and Ostrobramska Street including Grochowska Street but hemmed in by Zameniecka Street to the west. Its main shopping centre is King Cross Praga which is located opposite the end terminal for a tramline that runs through Rondo (Roundabout) Wiatraczna before connecting with other parts of the city.

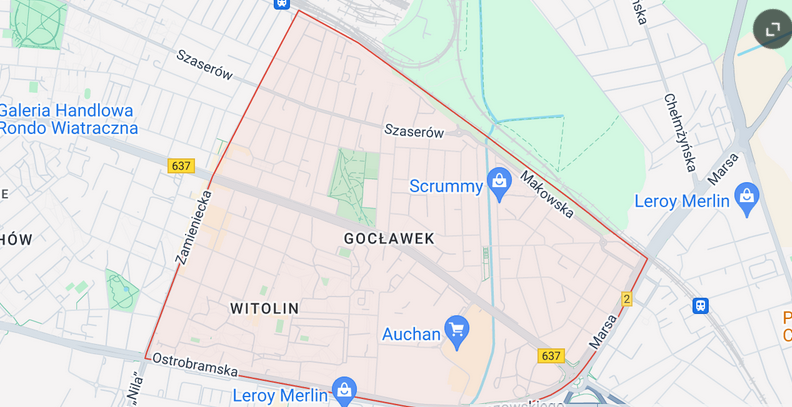

The architecture of the neighbourhood is typical of the suburbs of the city, the oldest buildings date from the period of the November Uprising.
