= Silesian–Dąbrowa Bridge =

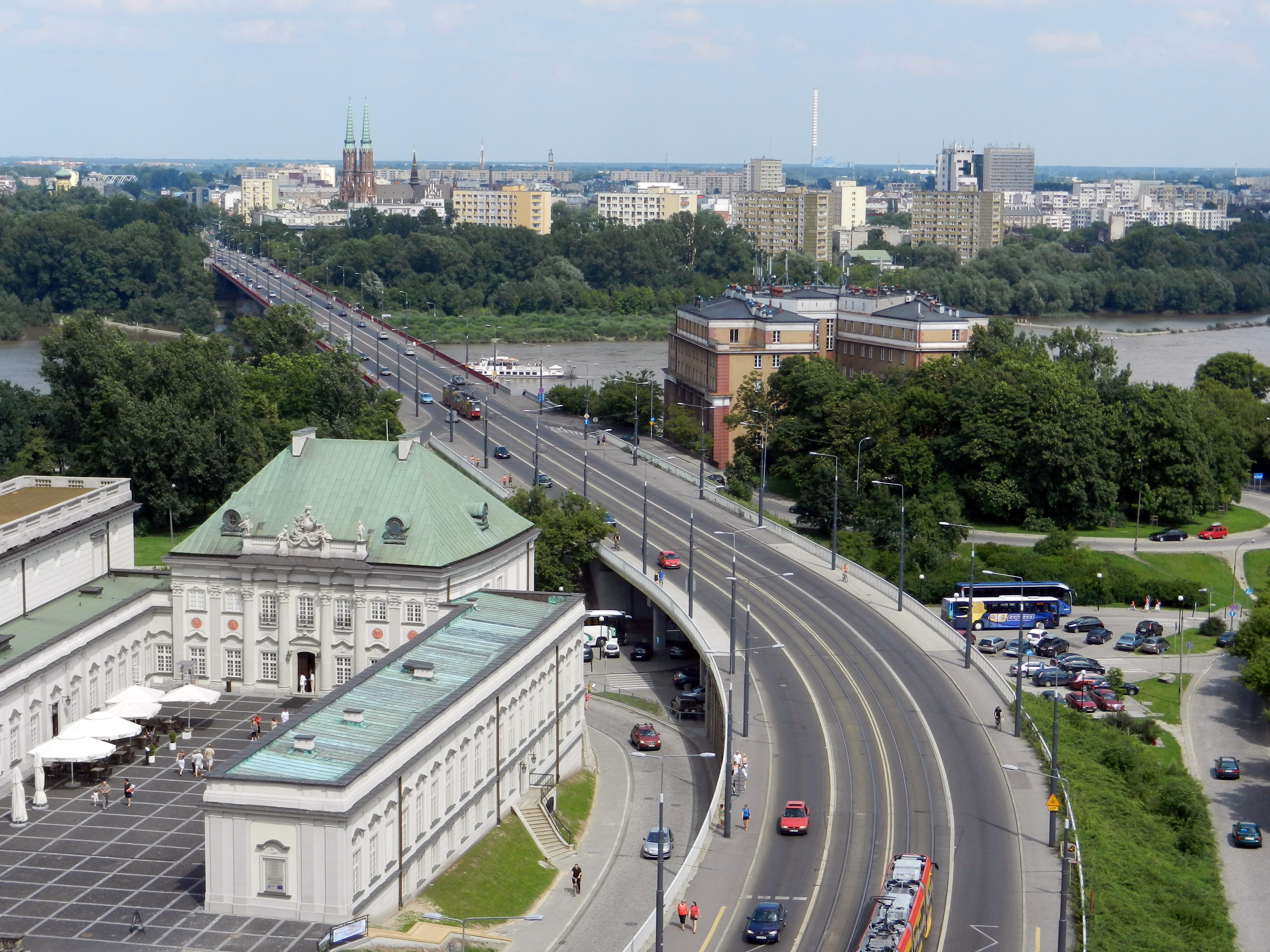
- Silesian–Dąbrowa Bridge
- Coordinates: 52°14′58″N 21°1′22″E
- Carries: Road transport, Trams
- Crosses: Vistula River
- Locale: Warsaw
- Followed by: Gdańsk Bridge

Characteristics
- Total length: 527 m
- Width: • Overall: 20.7 m • Roadway: 17.7 m • Sidewalks: 3 m
- No. of spans: 6

History
- Opened: July 21, 1949
- Replaces: Kierbedź Bridge (Most Kierbedzia)

Location
- Interactive map of Silesian–Dąbrowa Bridge

Silesian–Dąbrowa Bridge (Polish: Most Śląsko-Dąbrowski) is a bridge over the Vistula River in Warsaw. It was built from 1947 to 1949 on the pillars which remained from the Kierbedź Bridge which had been destroyed in World War II. Due to the bridge's completely different structure, it is recognized as a new bridge, not a rebuilt one.

The name of the bridge commemorates the contribution of regions of Silesia and the Dąbrowa Basin in the reconstruction of the capital after the devastation of World War II.

The bridge is an integral portion of the Warsaw W-Z Route main thoroughfare that, from 22 July, 1949, joined Praga in the east (one of Warsaw's least destroyed districts during World War II) with the city center, going through Muranów and out to Wola in the west.

Unlike most of the Warsaw tram tracks, trams on this bridge originally shared the bridge space with cars. In 2007, due to increased tram traffic along Route WZ during the modernization of tram routes on another major thoroughfare, Aleje Jerozolimskie, the tramway was separated from the roadway. This separation has continued even after traffic returned to normal and since 2009 the tramway also serves as a bus lane, significantly shortening travel times for public transport in the area.

The bridge has been renovated regularly including from 1992 to 1993 and in 2009.

There are plaques on the bridge commemorating events that took place on the older Kierbedź Bridge:

- for Zbigniew Gęsicki (aka Juno) and Kazimierz Sott (aka Sokół - Falcon), who were participants in the Home Army's assassination of Franz Kutschera in 1944. They had fled from the Germans and jumped from the bridge into the Vistula River where they were either drowned or shot
- to commemorate fighting on the bridge on 13 and 14 September, 1944 during the Warsaw Uprising
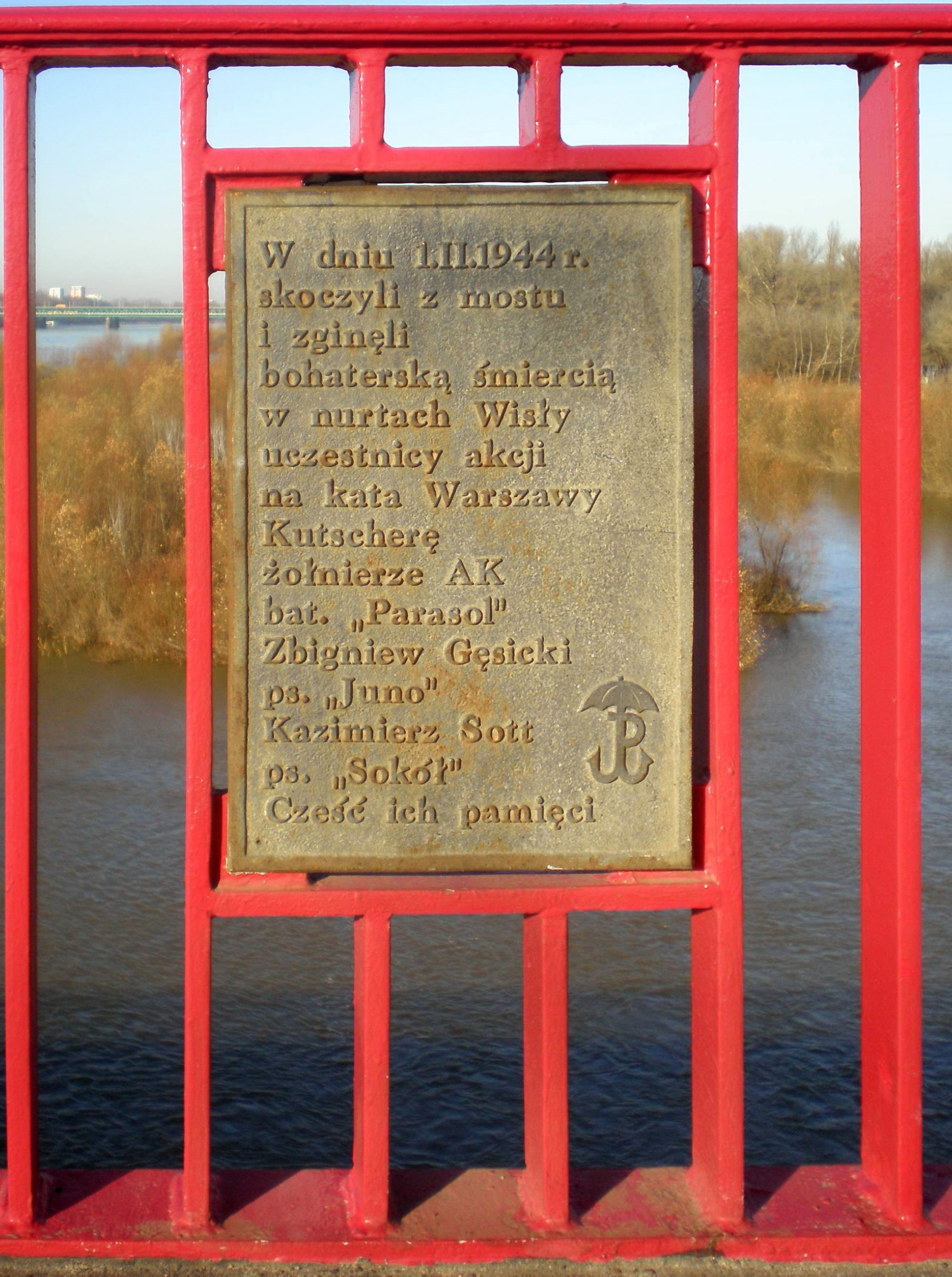
The plaque commemorating Juno and Sokół

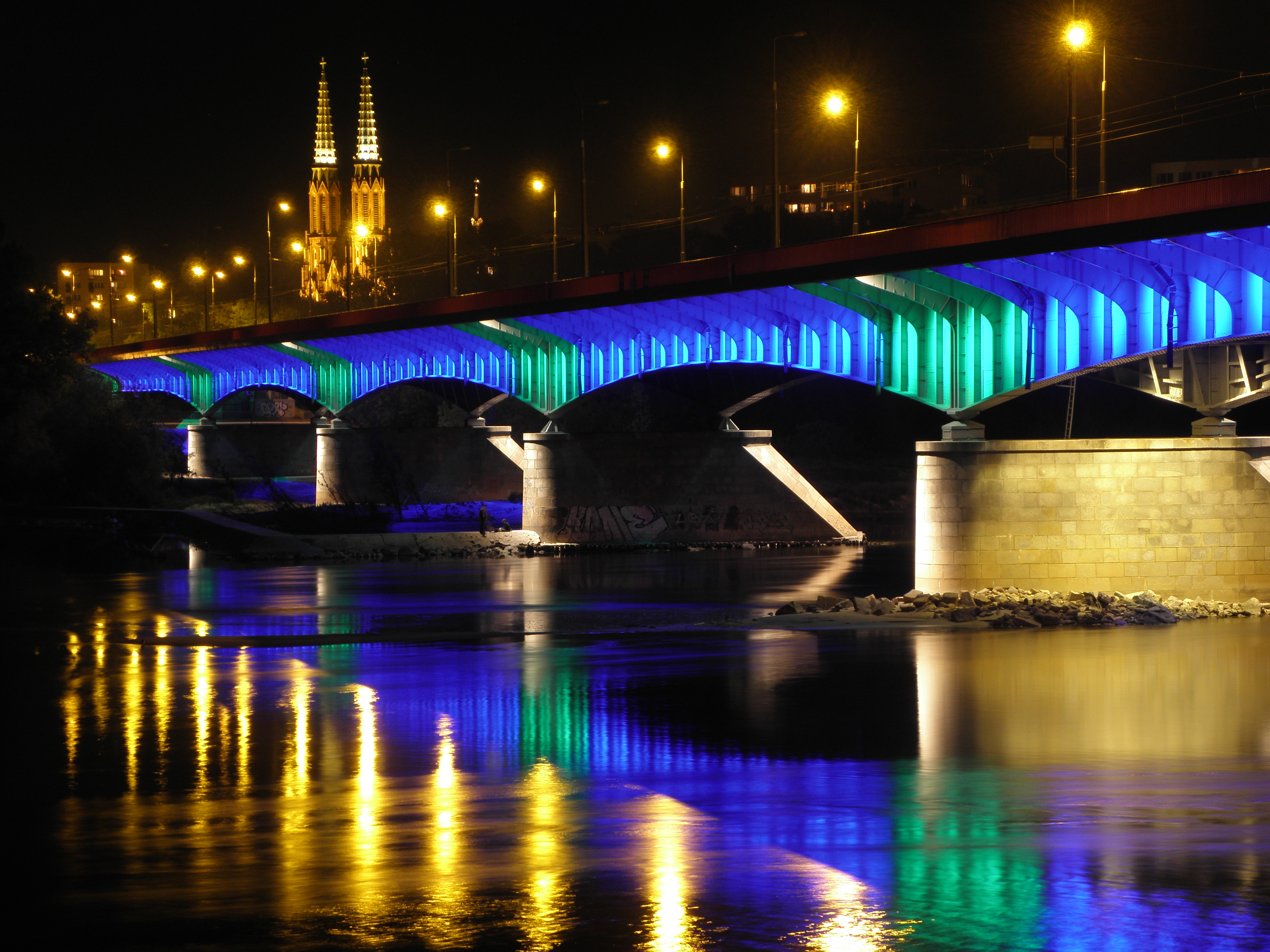
The bridge illuminated at night
