= Narutowicz Square =

Square in Warsaw

Coordinates: 52°13′08″N 20°59′01″E

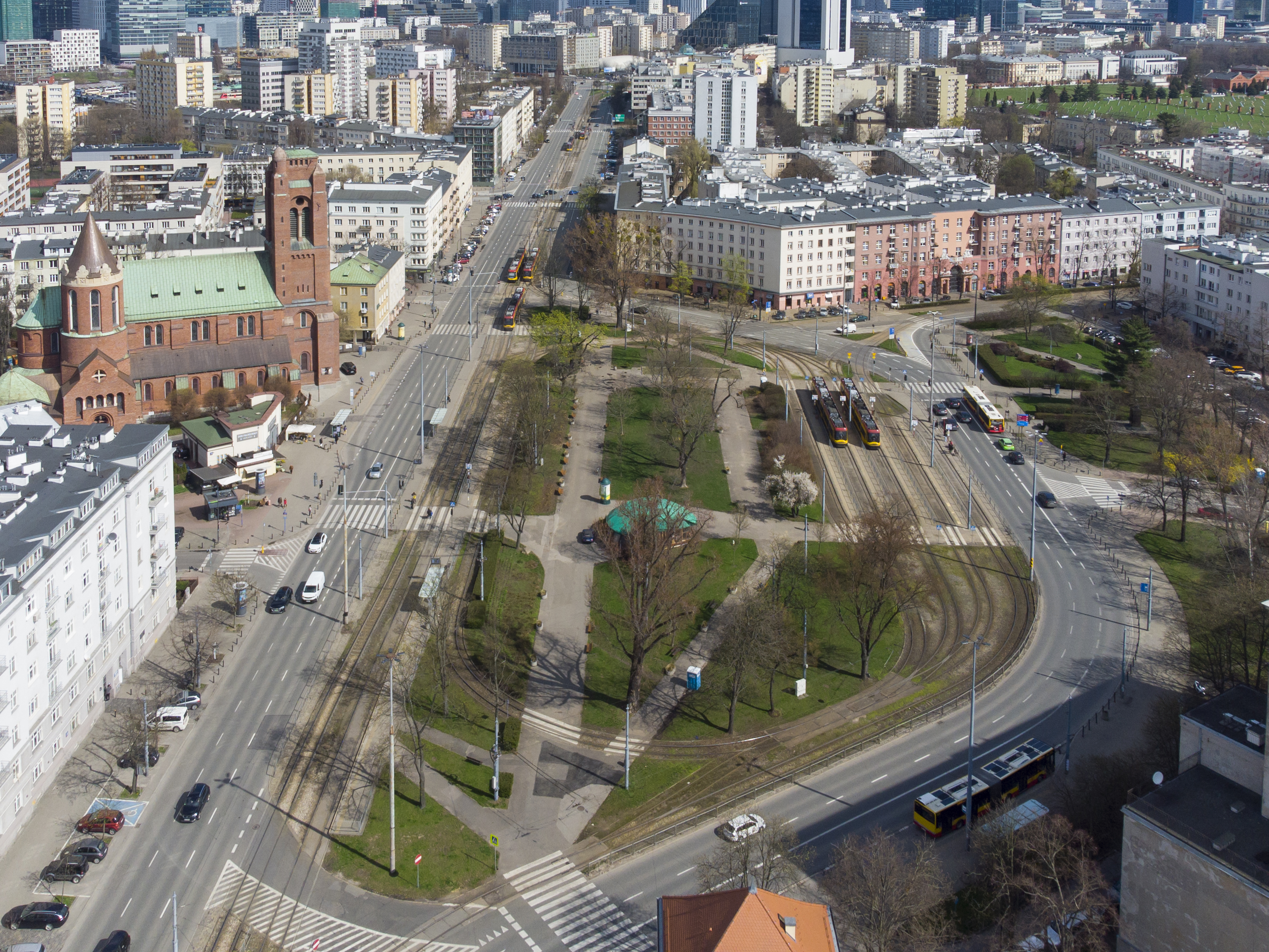
Gabriel Narutowicz Square

Narutowicz Square (Polish: Plac Narutowicza, Polish pronunciation: [ˈplats narutɔvitʂa]) is a city square located in the Ochota district in Warsaw, Poland.

The site is named after Gabriel Narutowicz, the first president of the Second Polish Republic. His monument was inaugurated here in 2002.

== History ==
The square was laid out in 1923 at the junction of Grojecka and Filtrowa Streets to facilitate the expansion of the district of Ochota and service the city center.

Notable buildings on the square include:

- Dormitory "Akademik" of the Warsaw University of Technology, at 5 Akademicka Street.
- Former revenue house of the Postal Saving Office at 68 Filtrowa Street
- Church of the Immaculate Conception of Blessed Virgin Mary, home to the parish of St James the Apostle, at 38 Grójecka Street.
