= Soviet air raids on Warsaw during World War II =

- Part of World War II
| Date | 1941–1944 |
| Location | Warsaw 52°13′56″N 21°00′30″E |
| Result | About a dozen Soviet air raids, approximately 1,000 deaths, several thousand wounded, and many thousands left homeless 300 buildings completely destroyed, several hundred severely damaged |
| Territorial changes | Poland under occupation of Nazi Germany |

Belligerents
| Nazi Germany | Soviet Union |
- Location within present day Poland

Soviet air raids on Warsaw during World War II were a series of air raids on German-occupied Warsaw conducted by the Soviet Air Forces from 1941 to 1944, primarily by the Soviet Long Range Aviation.

The first Soviet air raids on Poland's occupied capital occurred in late June 1941. Over the following years, Soviet aircraft bombed Warsaw approximately a dozen times, with the most significant casualties and damage caused by raids in the summer of 1942 and May 1943. The targets were German military installations and communication hubs. However, Soviet bombs frequently struck densely populated residential areas, including the Warsaw Ghetto. The raids resulted in at least 1,000 deaths among Warsaw residents, several thousand injuries, and the destruction or damage of hundreds of buildings.

During the Polish People's Republic, this topic was largely marginalized in official historiography.

== Initial raids ==
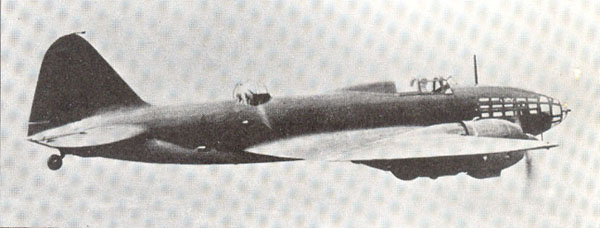
Il-4 (previously designated DB-3F) bomber used in raids on Warsaw

The first Soviet air raid on Warsaw occurred on the evening of 23 June 1941, the second day of the German invasion of the Soviet Union. At 7:17 PM, DB-3F bombers from the 212th Independent Long-Range Bomber Regiment attacked the bridges over the Vistula river and German targets within the city, including the Pocisk ammunition factory in Rembertów. The German anti-aircraft defenses were caught off guard, with Polish sources reporting that the air raid alarm was sounded 15 minutes after the attack began. The Soviet bombers, dropping bombs from 8,000 meters, failed to damage the bridges, with some bombs landing in the Vistula. Nonetheless, the raid caused significant destruction in the city, hitting the ruins of the Grand Theatre (previously bombed by Germans in 1939), houses at 6 Foch Street (now Molier Street) and 55 Krakowskie Przedmieście Street, and igniting a hangar at Okęcie Airport. German anti-aircraft artillery positions at the Służewiec Racecourse were also targeted.

According to the underground newspaper Biuletyn Informacyjny of 3 July 1941, the raid killed approximately 50 Germans, including about 40 Luftwaffe personnel at the Służewiec Racecourse. However, historian Krzysztof Dunin-Wąsowicz estimated German losses at only six dead and two wounded from the first two raids. Civilian losses were significant, with Dunin-Wąsowicz estimating 42 Warsaw residents killed and 55 injured. In Praga, a bomb struck a crowded tram near the St. Florian's Cathedral, en route to the Kierbedź Bridge, killing 34 people – the deadliest incident in Poland's urban transport history. German propaganda, via Völkischer Beobachter, falsely claimed 48 Soviet aircraft were shot down, while Soviet propaganda exaggerated the raid's impact, reporting the destruction of fuel and propellant depots.

Further raids occurred on 24 June and, according to Szymon Kazimierski, 25 June. Soviet aircraft primarily targeted areas around the city, bombing the vicinity of Towarowa Street and the Citadel Rail Bridge, with limited accuracy. These initial raids caused significant unease among Germans in Warsaw. The German-controlled Nowy Kurier Warszawski published a brief note about the raid two days later. On 30 June 1941, Ludwig Fischer, governor of the Warsaw District, banned photographing damaged sites.

Due to early Soviet defeats in the war, the next raid did not occur until 13 November 1941. Around 11:00 AM, several Yer-2 bombers from the 421st Bomber Regiment (or possibly a single aircraft, per Biuletyn Informacyjny) attacked the railway junction near today's Artut Zawisza Square. Eight bombs, dropped from high altitude, damaged the main track on Towarowa Street, a ramp, a siding, and a signal box. Władysław Bartoszewski and Tomasz Szarota reported that rail traffic was halted for nearly 24 hours, though Tymoteusz Pawłowski argued railway infrastructure sustained minimal damage. Bombs also hit residential buildings on Srebrna Street and Miedziana Street, killing 54 civilians and injuring 100. The explosions shattered hundreds of windows, causing a surge in glazing service costs. German anti-aircraft defenses failed again, becoming a subject of ridicule, as noted in a report by city military commander Colonel Walter von Unruh.

For nearly a year, Soviet aircraft conducted only occasional nighttime reconnaissance flights over Warsaw, prompting frequent air raid alerts.

== Raids in the summer of 1942 ==
=== Course of events ===
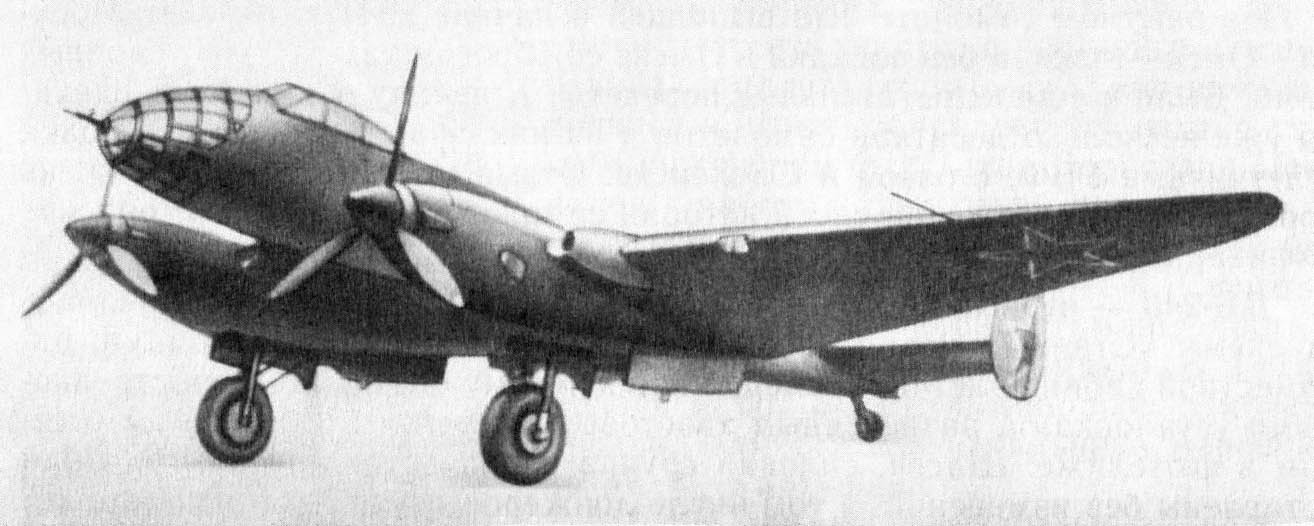
Yer-2 bomber used in raids on Warsaw

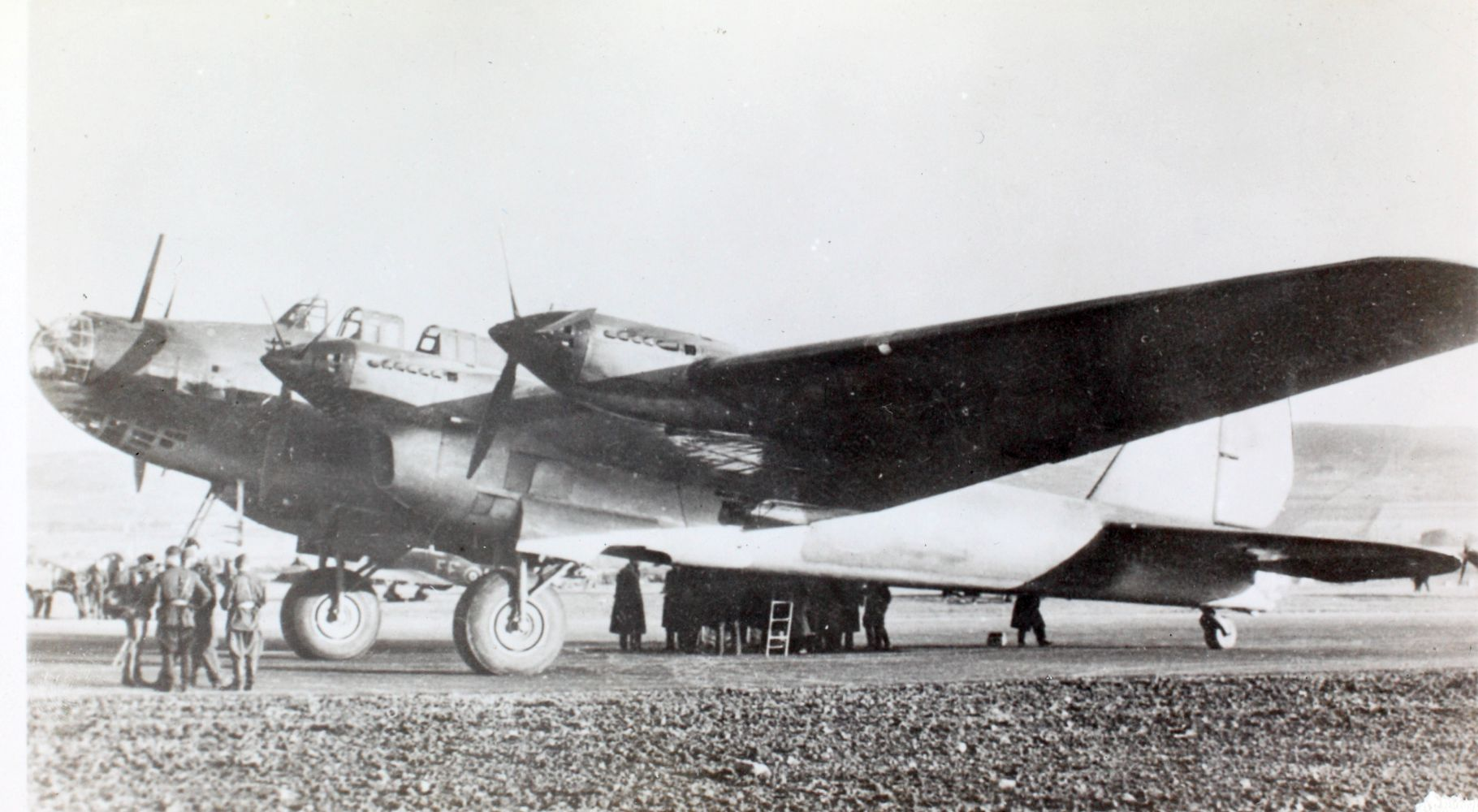
Pe-8 bomber used in raids on Warsaw

Soviet air operations resumed over Warsaw in late summer 1942.

The first raid occurred on the night of 20–21 August. Pe-8 and Yer-2 bombers from the 45th Long Range Bomber Division dropped illuminating flares on parachutes, followed by a multi-hour raid. High-explosive and incendiary bombs primarily struck residential districts, including Grochów, Mokotów, Wola, Żoliborz, and areas near Marszałkowska Street. Few bombs hit German-occupied targets. According to Biuletyn Informacyjny of 27 August 1942, German losses were approximately 60 dead and fewer than 300 wounded (soldiers and civilians), while Polish civilian losses were estimated at 200 dead and 800 injured. Among the casualties was Professor Józef Patkowski, a physicist, former rector of Stefan Batory University in Vilnius (1887–1937), and lecturer at the underground University of Warsaw. The newspaper reported that Soviet bombs hit approximately 130 residential buildings, sparking 40 fires. Bartoszewski estimated about 50 buildings were struck. The tram depot on Młynarska Street in Wola was severely damaged, disrupting public transport. The power grid also suffered outages. The number of fires exceeded those during the German bombing on 25 September 1939, known as "Black Monday". Damage to a pavilion of the Father Boduen Orphanage at 75 Nowogrodzka Street forced the evacuation of approximately 200 children to a shelter in Góra Kalwaria.

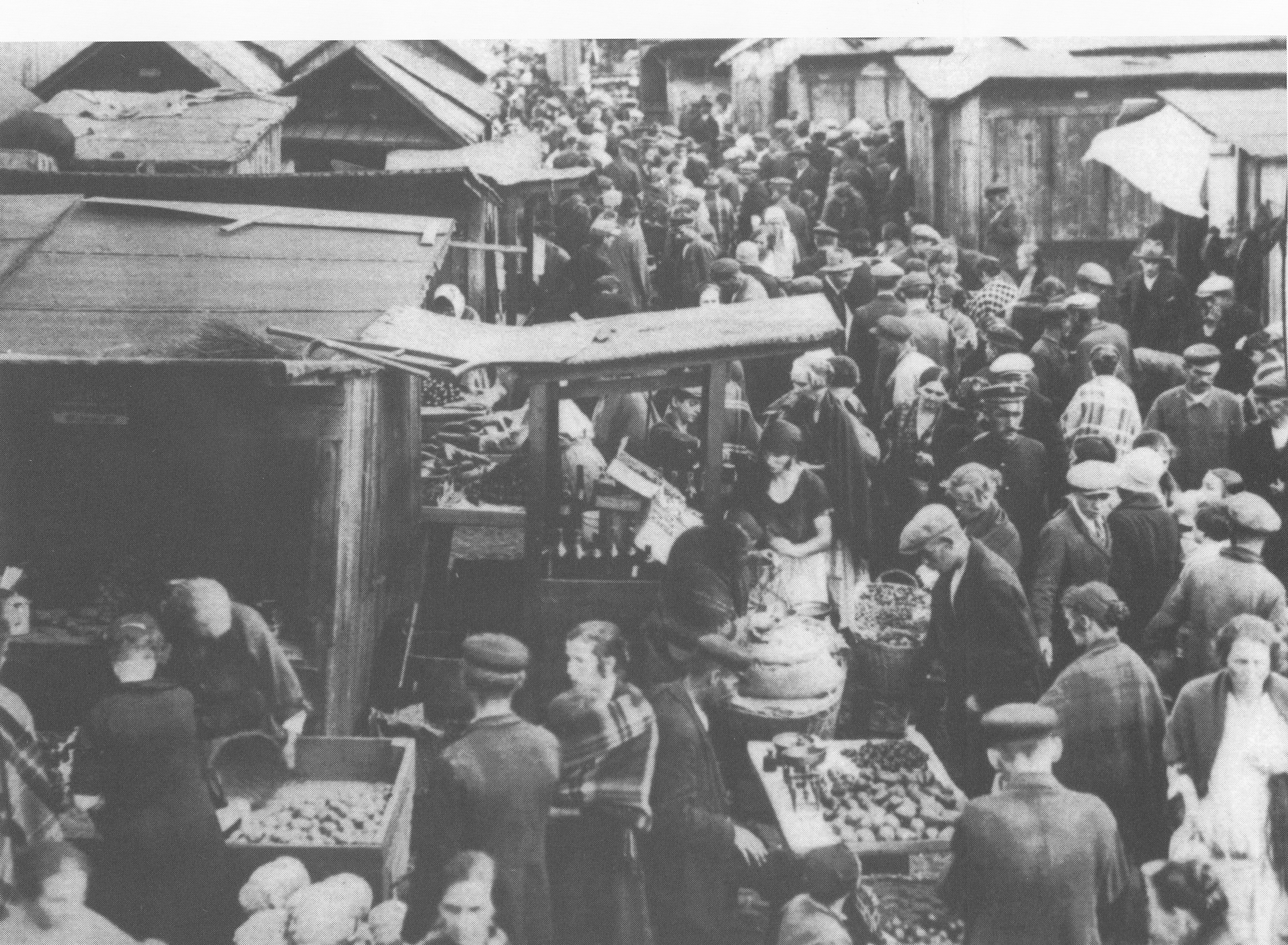
Kercelak marketplace (1928). Nearly 1,000 stalls burned due to the Soviet raid on the night of 1–2 September 1942

A more intense raid occurred on the night of 1–2 September, described as significantly more effective. Between 20 and 30 bombers from the 3rd Guards Long Range Bomber Regiment flew in waves, dropping about 300 bombs. The primary targets were Wola, Praga, and Powiśle, from Poniatowski Bridge to Nowy Zjazd Street. Bombs damaged railway tracks and rolling stock at the Warszawa Wileńska railway station in Praga and destroyed 45 military vehicles in German garages behind the Sejm complex. The Central Post Office and the German-occupied Ministry of Communication building were also hit. Civilian areas were heavily affected, with around 100 buildings destroyed or severely damaged. The Wola tram depot was bombed again. Bombs also fell on the Warsaw Ghetto, Powązki Cemetery, and areas near the Transfiguration Hospital and Dzieciątko Jezus Hospital. The Kercelak marketplace suffered partial destruction, with nearly 1,000 stalls and goods worth $500,000 on the black market burned. This caused a supply crisis and sharp food price increases. Estimates of casualties vary, ranging from 200 to 400. Governor Ludwig Fischer reported 239 deaths and 511 injuries for both August and September raids. Losses in the Warsaw Ghetto, amid the Great Deportation, are unquantified. Among the victims was Colonel Leopold Rudke, a Polish Legions veteran and doctor at Ujazdów Hospital. German propaganda downplayed the raids, with Nowy Kurier Warszawski mentioning them only on 4 September.

The final raid of 1942 occurred on 13 September, when a lone bomber accurately targeted the Cross-City Bridge.

=== Impact on civilian morale ===
The summer 1942 raids were initially welcomed by Warsaw's residents, but sentiment shifted as civilian areas bore the brunt of the bombings. Panic gripped the city, surpassing the fear during the German bombings of September 1939, attributed to the population's exhaustion after three years of war and occupation. A September 1942 report from the Government Delegation for Poland to the Polish government-in-exile stated:

Thousands have permanently left Warsaw for its outskirts, while thousands more leave nightly for the suburbs, considered safer than densely built districts. The physical and mental resilience of Polish society has drastically declined, with nervous exhaustion making alarming progress.

Witnesses reported columns of carts and wagons carrying belongings of fleeing residents. Train stations were overcrowded, and rental prices in nearby towns soared (up to 600 PLN monthly for a room). Some refugees camped in fields, forests, and parks rather than risk staying in the city. Governor Fischer noted the panic among non-German residents. Germans and occupation officials also exhibited fear, with many sending families back to the Third Reich. The raids briefly fostered fraternization between Germans and Poles, met with Polish satisfaction. A German police official issued instructions for Germans to remain calm and disciplined in shared shelters.

Reports from the Polish Underground State noted a rise in antisemitism in Warsaw, with the raids labeled "Jewish, shoddy work". In the Warsaw Ghetto, the raids were welcomed as retaliation for the ongoing deportations to Treblinka, though no such connection existed.

== Carpet bombing of 12–13 May 1943 ==
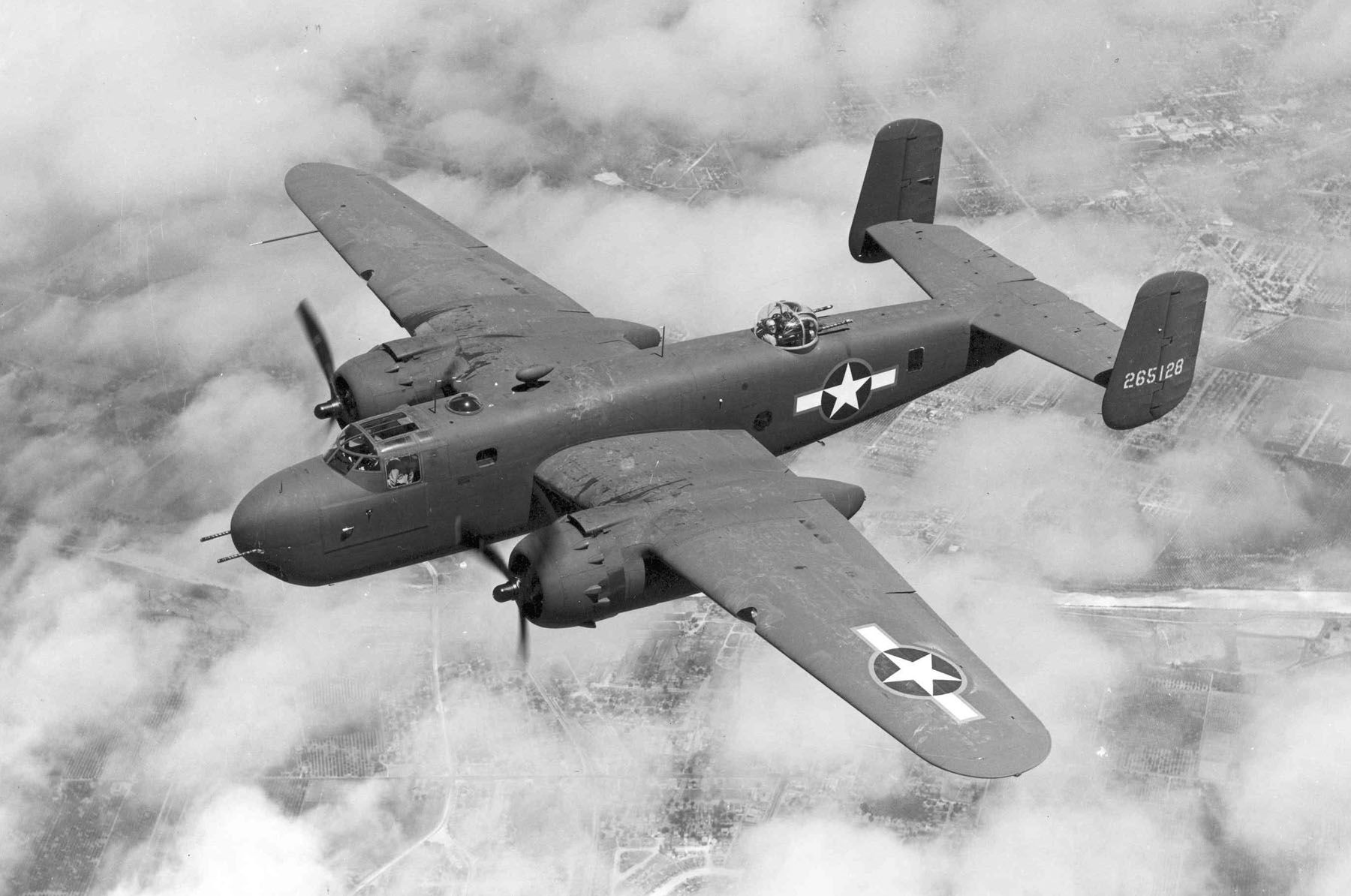
B-25 Mitchell bomber, supplied to the Soviet Union via Lend-Lease, used in raids on Warsaw

The most intense Soviet air raid on Warsaw occurred on the night of 12–13 May 1943. The 108th and 421st Long Range Bomber Regiments, equipped with B-25 Mitchell bombers supplied via Lend-Lease, conducted the attack. Dozens of aircraft appeared over the city around 11:30 PM, dropping illuminating flares before bombing until 1:30 AM. Approximately 100 tons of bombs, including 500-kilogram high-explosive bombs, were dropped, alongside hundreds of propaganda leaflets urging Poles to fight Germans and reprinting a letter from Stalin on Polish-Soviet relations (sent to a New York Times correspondent on 4 May 1943).

The official targets were Okęcie Airport and the Warsaw railway junction. Chronicler Ludwik Maurycy Landau noted that damage to military targets was minimal relative to the raid's scale, with rail traffic restored by the afternoon of 13 May. German losses were estimated at 17 dead and 17 wounded. Civilians suffered heavily, with bombs hitting Śródmieście tenements on Marszałkowska Street and Saviour Square, areas around Emilia Plater Street and 6 Sierpnia Street, and densely populated sections of Wola, Praga, and Ochota. Several bombs fell on the ruins of the Warsaw Ghetto, where the Warsaw Ghetto Uprising was subsiding. Dozens of buildings were destroyed, and many others were severely damaged. The Koszyki Hall and stalls at Kazimierz Wielki Square were partially destroyed. A bomb explosion damaged a water main, flooding a basement and drowning trapped civilians. The Filter Plant Complex was hit, temporarily cutting off the city's water supply. Firefighting efforts continued until 14 May.

Initial estimates reported over 1,000 civilian deaths. Nowy Kurier Warszawski claimed 149 dead, 17 missing, and 223 injured, with 889 left homeless. Biuletyn Informacyjny of 20 May 1943 estimated 300 Polish deaths, 1,000 injuries, and nearly 1,000 families displaced. Fischer's report noted 236 deaths, including 14 Germans, and approximately 800 apartments destroyed or damaged, leaving 2,500 homeless. Dunin-Wąsowicz estimated 49 civilian deaths and 146 injuries.

German propaganda exploited the raid to fuel anti-Soviet and anti-Semitic sentiments, linking it to the Katyn massacre and the ghetto uprising.

== Bombings in 1944 ==
After the May 1943 carpet bombing, Soviet air operations over Warsaw ceased for over a year. Activity resumed in late July 1944 as Soviet armies approached the city. Red Army tactical aircraft conducted reconnaissance and attacked retreating German columns, typically in the evening or at night.

On the night of 27–28 July, a heavy raid targeted right-bank Warsaw's rail and tram networks. Bombs hit areas near Warszawa Wileńska railway station (rumors of its destruction were exaggerated), Bródno, and Grochów, particularly around Wiatraczna Street. The tram network near George Washington Avenue, Grenadierów Street, and Zygmuntowska Street was severely damaged, as were Wola, Okęcie, and Ursus. The following night, Soviet bombers and ground-attack aircraft struck Praga and Warszawa Zachodnia station. Between 29 and 31 July, Soviet fighters conducted low-level attacks on German anti-aircraft positions in the city.

After the outbreak of the Warsaw Uprising on 1 August 1944, the Red Army halted its advance toward Warsaw. For nearly six weeks, until 10 September, Soviet air forces were restricted to reconnaissance flights over the city.

As Soviet forces resumed their offensive, intense air operations followed. On 13 September, approximately 40 aircraft bombed areas around George Washington Avenue during the assault on Praga. In the following days, Soviet aircraft targeted fortified German positions in left-bank Warsaw, including the Citadel, Sejm buildings, the Gestapo headquarters area on Jan Chrystian Szuch Avenue, barracks on Rakowiecka Street and 29 Listopada Street, the National Museum, and the Saxon Garden. Railway stations (Warszawa Główna, Warszawa Gdańska, and Warszawa Zachodnia) were also bombed. The heaviest raids, lasting all day, occurred on 19 and 21 September.

== Summary ==
Between 22 June 1941 and 31 July 1944, nearly 100 air raid alerts were sounded in Warsaw. Soviet aircraft conducted approximately a dozen raids, with three particularly intense ones (20–21 August and 1–2 September 1942, and 12–13 May 1943).

The exact toll of casualties and material damage remains unquantified. Conservative estimates suggest approximately 1,000 Warsaw residents died, thousands were injured, and many lost their homes. These figures exclude losses in the Warsaw Ghetto. At least 300 buildings were completely destroyed, and several hundred were severely damaged, affecting about 3% of Warsaw's pre-uprising infrastructure. The raids disrupted German plans for a consolidated German residential district in Warsaw, as fear deterred settlement.

The raids left a mark on Warsaw's folklore, notably in the wartime song Siekiera, motyka with the line "at night an air raid, by day a roundup". They also contributed to a surge in religiosity, evidenced by the construction of courtyard shrines across the city.

The Soviet air raids remain one of the least-remembered episodes of World War II. German propaganda consistently downplayed their impact, and during the Polish People's Republic, the topic was effectively taboo. Until 1989, the raids were mentioned only marginally in broader studies of Warsaw's wartime history, and no memorials commemorate the victims.

Historians from the Polish People's Republic suggested Warsaw's residents accepted the bombings with understanding, focusing on German losses. Accounts by Ludwik Maurycy Landau and Halina Krahelska support this view. However, the 1942 and 1943 raids caused greater anxiety than the German bombings of September 1939, sometimes escalating to panic.

Doubts emerged during the war about whether the bombing of civilian targets was accidental. The underground Biuletyn Informacyjny titled its report on the 12–13 May 1943 raid Incompetence or Crime? while Rzeczpospolita Polska called it New Soviet Criminal Barbarism (25 May 1943).

Tymoteusz Pawłowski and Szymon Kazimierski noted that the heaviest raids coincided with strained Polish-Soviet relations, following the evacuation of Anders' Army from the Soviet Union (August 1942) and the Katyn massacre discovery and Soviet severance of diplomatic ties with the Polish government-in-exile (April 1943).

== Bibliography ==
- Bartoszewski, Władysław (2008). 1859 dni Warszawy [1859 Days of Warsaw] (in Polish). Kraków: Znak. ISBN 978-83-240-1057-8.
- Szarota, Tomasz (2005). "Naloty na Warszawę podczas II wojny światowej" [Air Raids on Warsaw During World War II]. In Fałkowski, Wojciech (ed.). Straty Warszawy 1939–1945. Raport [Losses of Warsaw 1939–1945: Report] (in Polish). Warsaw: Miasto Stołeczne Warszawa. ISBN 83-922369-7-1.
- Szarota, Tomasz (2010). Okupowanej Warszawy dzień powszedni [Everyday Life in Occupied Warsaw] (in Polish). Warsaw: Czytelnik. ISBN 978-83-07-03239-9.
