= Rzeczpospolita (disambiguation) =

Rzeczpospolita is a Polish word for "republic" or "commonwealth".

Rzeczpospolita may also refer to:

- Rzeczpospolita (newspaper), published since 1920 (with hiatuses)
- Rzeczpospolita Polska (magazine), published 1941–1945

== See also ==
- Polish Republics
