= Warszawa Zacisze Wilno railway station =

Railway stop in Warsaw, Poland

Warszawa Zacisze Wilno
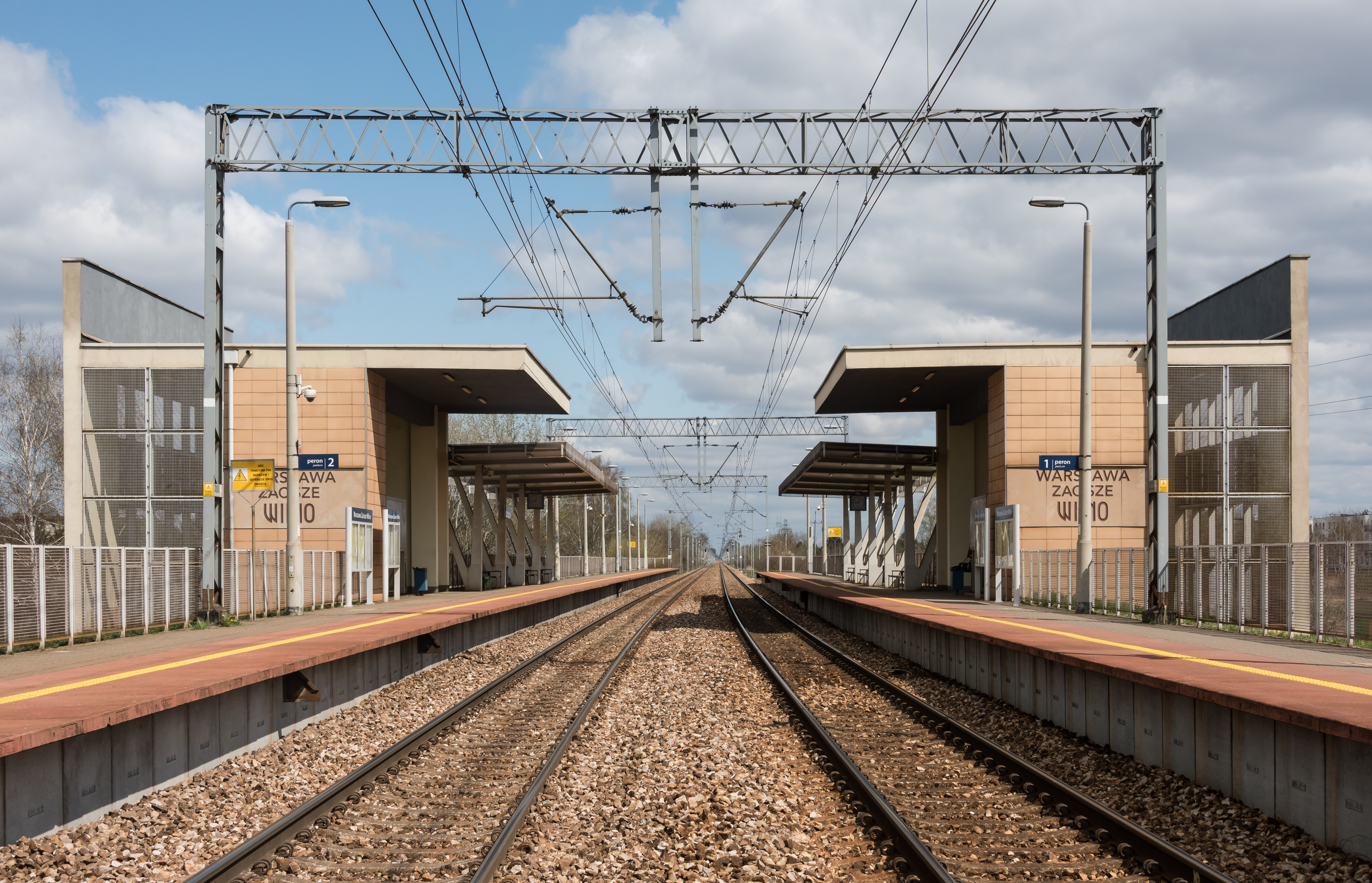

General information
- Location: Targówek, Warsaw, Masovian; Poland
- Coordinates: 52°16′40″N 21°04′48″E
- Owner: Polskie Koleje Państwowe S.A.
- Platforms: 2
- Tracks: 2

History
- Opened: 9 June 2013

Services
Preceding station	Masovian Railways	Following station
Warszawa Wileńska Terminus	R60	Ząbki towards Czyżew
Warszawa Wileńska Terminus	RE60	Ząbki towards Łochów
Location

Warszawa Zacisze Wilno railway station is a railway station in the Targówek district of Warsaw, Poland. As of 2022, it is used by Masovian Railways, which runs services to Warszawa Wileńska and Czyżew.

== History ==
The station was built as a result of a public-private partnership with a real estate developer, Dom Development, who was building the nearby housing estate. The construction cost was estimated at 6.5 million zloty.

The station was opened on 9 June 2013, and was officially transferred to PKP Polskie Linie Kolejowe on 19 June 2013.

The nearby neighbourhood Zacisze was not connected to the station as a result of a disagreement between the authorities and local allotment gardeners. The connection was eventually built and opened on 26 December 2019.
