= Galeria Wileńska =

Shopping centre in Warsaw, Poland

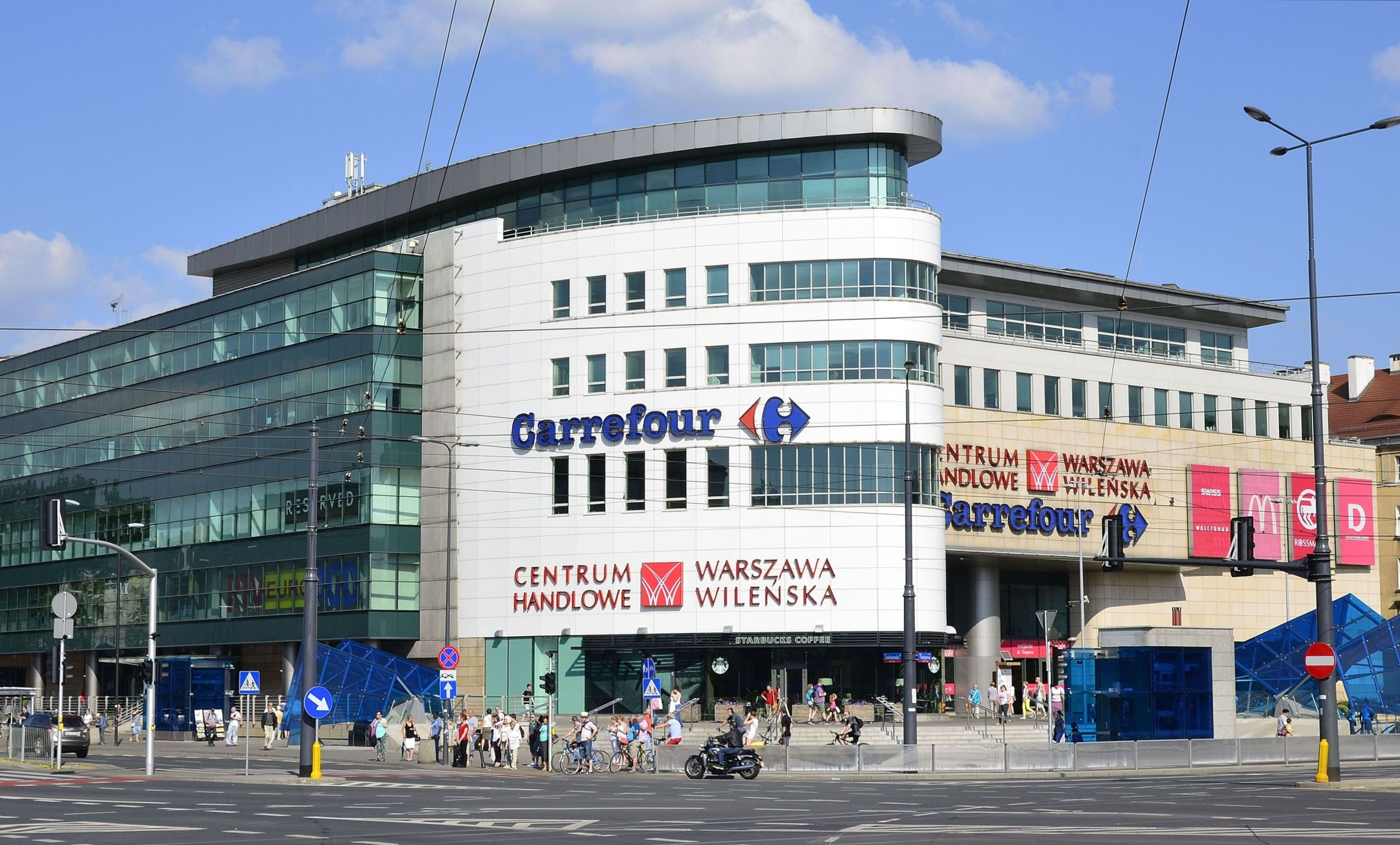
- Galeria Wileńska in 2015.
- Interactive map of the Galeria Wileńska area

General information
- Type: Shopping centre and office building
- Location: Praga-North, Warsaw, Poland, 72 Targowa Street
- Coordinates: 52°15′16.29″N 21°02′09.16″E
- Construction started: 2000
- Completed: 2002
- Owner: Unibail-Rodamco-Westfield

Technical details
- Floor count: 5

Design and construction
- Main contractor: Warbud

Other information
- Public transit access: Dworzec Wileński

Galeria Wileńska (Polish: [ɡaˈlɛ.rja viˈlɛɲ.ska]; lit. 'Vilnius Mall') is a shopping centre and office building in Warsaw, Poland, located at 72 Targowa Street, in the district of Praga-North. It was opened in 2002, and is attached to the Warszawa Wileńska railway station.

== History ==
Galeria Wileńska was constructed between 2000 and 2002, attached to the Warszawa Wileńska railway station. Until 2015, it was named Centrum Handlowe Warszawa Wileńska. Its opening caused many local stores to close, and decreased the presence of street markets which were previously characteristic to the area.

In 2015, an apiary was opened on the roof.

== Characteristics ==
Galeria Wileńska is a shopping centre located at 72 Targowa Street, in the neighbourhood of Old Praga in the district of Praga-North. It is attached to the Warszawa Wileńska railway station.

The building has 5 storeys, and the total area of 30,000 m^{2}, of which 12,000 m^{2} is dedicated to office spaces. In 2020, in the shopping centre operated 86 stores and services, and 12 restaurants and bars. It is owned by Unibail-Rodamco-Westfield.
