= Bombing of Warsaw in World War II =

The bombing of Warsaw in World War II began with the German Luftwaffe's campaign of aerial bombardment of Warsaw during the siege of Warsaw, following the invasion of Poland on 1 September 1939. It also included German bombing raids during the Warsaw Uprising in 1944. During the course of the war, approximately 85% of the city was destroyed due to German mass bombings, heavy artillery fire, and a planned demolition campaign.

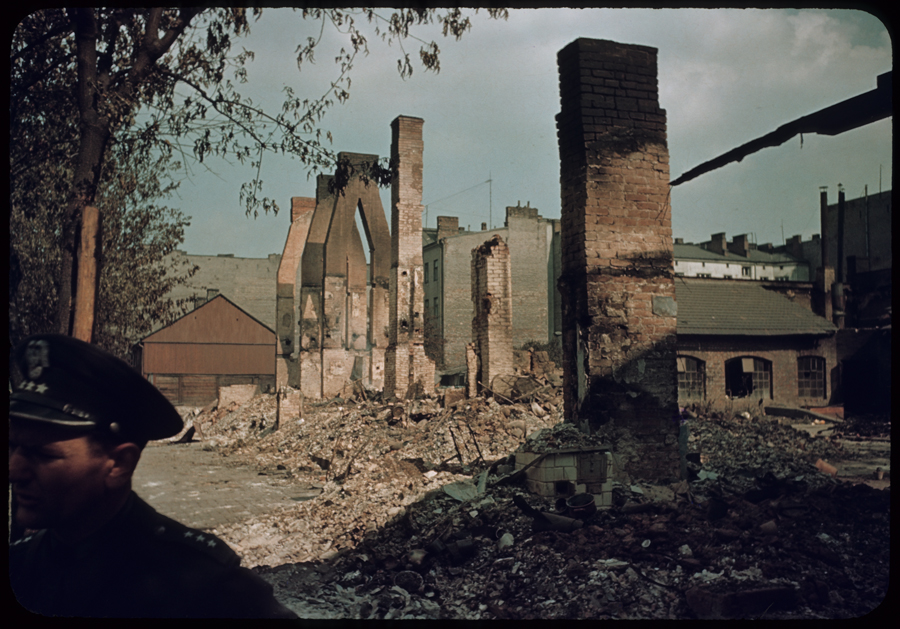
Warsaw after German bombardment in September 1939.

Siege of Warsaw by Julien Bryan

== Siege of Warsaw (1939) ==
In 1939, the Luftwaffe opened the German attack on Poland with Operation Wasserkante, an air attack on Warsaw on 1 September. This attack by four bomber groups was of limited effectiveness due to low-lying cloud cover and stout Polish resistance by the PZL P.11 fighters of the Pursuit Brigade, which claimed down 16 German aircraft for the loss of 10 of their own. However, heavy losses in Polish fighter aircraft meant that by 6 September the air defense of Warsaw was in the hands of the 40 mm (24 guns), 75 mm (72 guns) anti-aircraft guns and many anti-aircraft machine guns of the Warsaw Defense Command.

As the German Army approached Warsaw on 8 September 1939, 140 Junkers Ju 87 Stukas attacked the portions of the city on the east bank of the Vistula River and other bombers bombed the Polish Army positions in the western suburbs. On 13 September Luftwaffe level and dive bombers caused widespread fires. Further resistance was followed by propaganda leaflet drops.

Finally, starting at 0800 on 25 September, Luftwaffe bombers under the command of Major Wolfram Freiherr von Richthofen conducted the largest air raid ever seen by that time, dropping 560 tons of high explosive bombs and 72 tons of incendiary bombs, in coordination with heavy artillery shelling by Army units. The center of Warsaw was badly damaged. Approximately 1,150 sorties were flown by a wide variety of aircraft, including obsolescent Junkers Ju 52/3m bombers, which dropped 13 percent of the incendiary bombs dropped on the day. Only two Ju 52 bombers were lost.

Although commonly portrayed as being absolutely decisive, the Black Monday air attack was a mixed success. While the bombing lowered Polish morale, it did not cause the Polish surrender. Smoke from fires and large amounts of dust obscured targets and greatly reduced accuracy. As a result, Luftwaffe bombers dropped a significant amount of their bomb loads on German infantry positions in the northwest suburbs of the city, leading to acrimonious discussions between Luftwaffe and Army commanders. The tonnage dropped combined with only approximate delivery on target and the short duration does not begin to approximate the intensity of attacks major European cities were subsequently to suffer.

However, on 26 September three key forts in the city defenses were captured, and the Polish garrison offered its surrender - on 27 September German troops entered the city. The international press reported that 20,000 to 40,000 civilians were killed, figures that have remained in the history books sixty years later. The real number is likely far lower; calculating with the same casualty rates as the most lethal bombing raids in World War II in Germany, the number of dead amounts to 6,000 to 7,000. 40 percent of the buildings in the city were damaged and 10 percent of the buildings destroyed. However, some of the damage was the result of ground artillery fire and not solely caused by aerial bombing—including intense street fighting between German infantry and armor units and Polish infantry and artillery.

The September 25 raid had the aim of breaking Polish morale and forcing a surrender. According to the laws of war in 1939, Warsaw was a defended military target and the Luftwaffe raid could be construed as a legitimate military operation.

The Siege of Warsaw accounted for 10% destroyed buildings by late-1939.

== Warsaw Uprising (1944) ==
The Luftwaffe conducted numerous strikes against Polish resistance and civilian targets. Warsaw's infrastructure was also heavily damaged by air raids, as desperate street-to-street fighting took place in the destroyed areas. After 63 days of heavy urban fighting, the Luftwaffe's combined efforts with artillery bombardment, and systemic destruction accounted for 85%-90% destroyed buildings by January 1945.

== Gallery ==
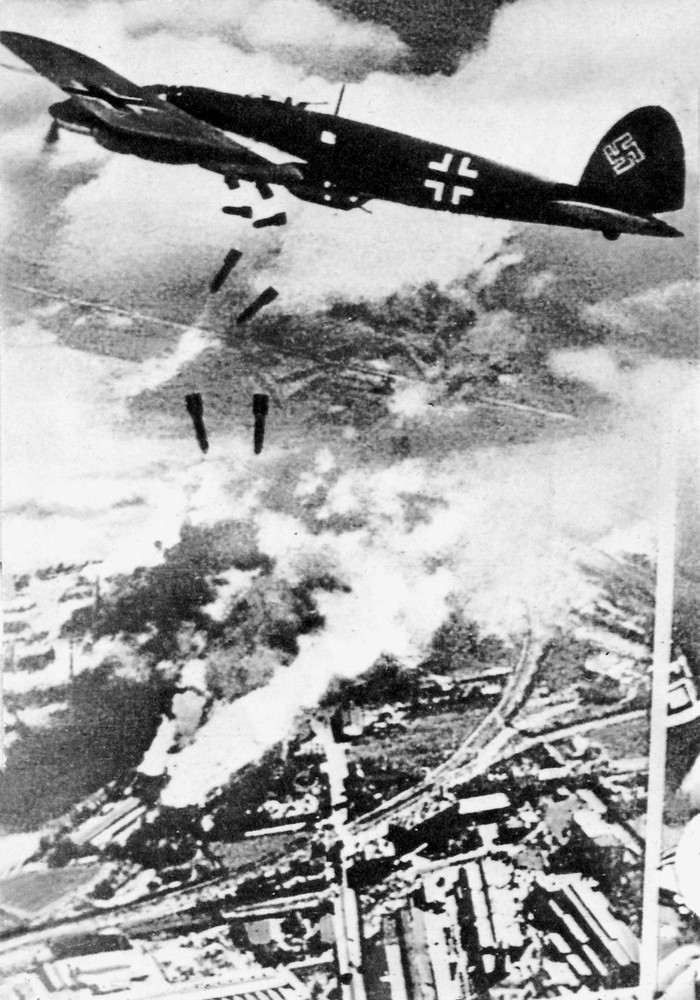
German Heinkel He 111 planes bombing Warsaw, September 1939

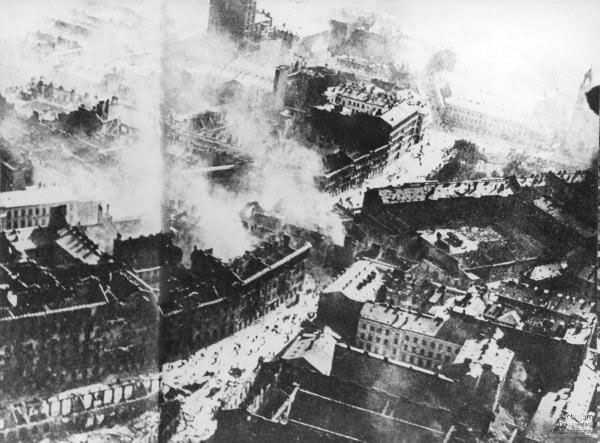
Warsaw after German Luftwaffe bombing, September 1939

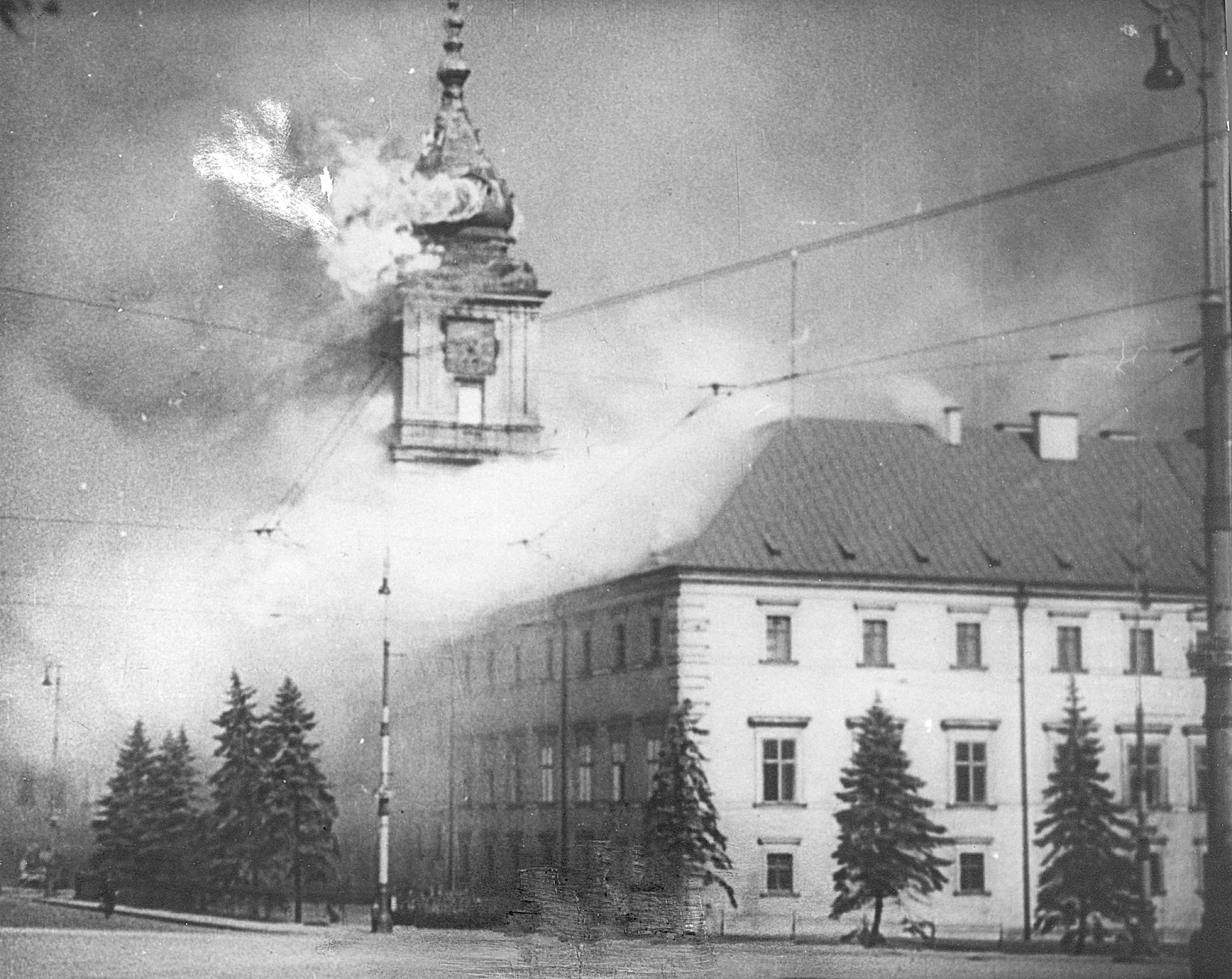
Royal Castle in Warsaw after the German bombing of the city, September 1939

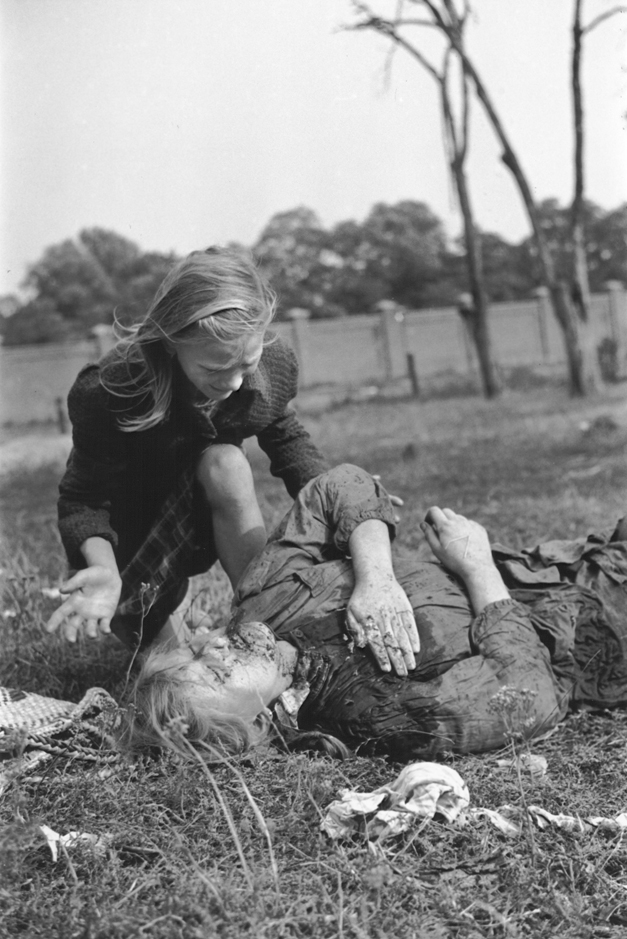
A Polish girl cries over the body of her 14-year-old sister who was strafed by German dive bombers, September 1939

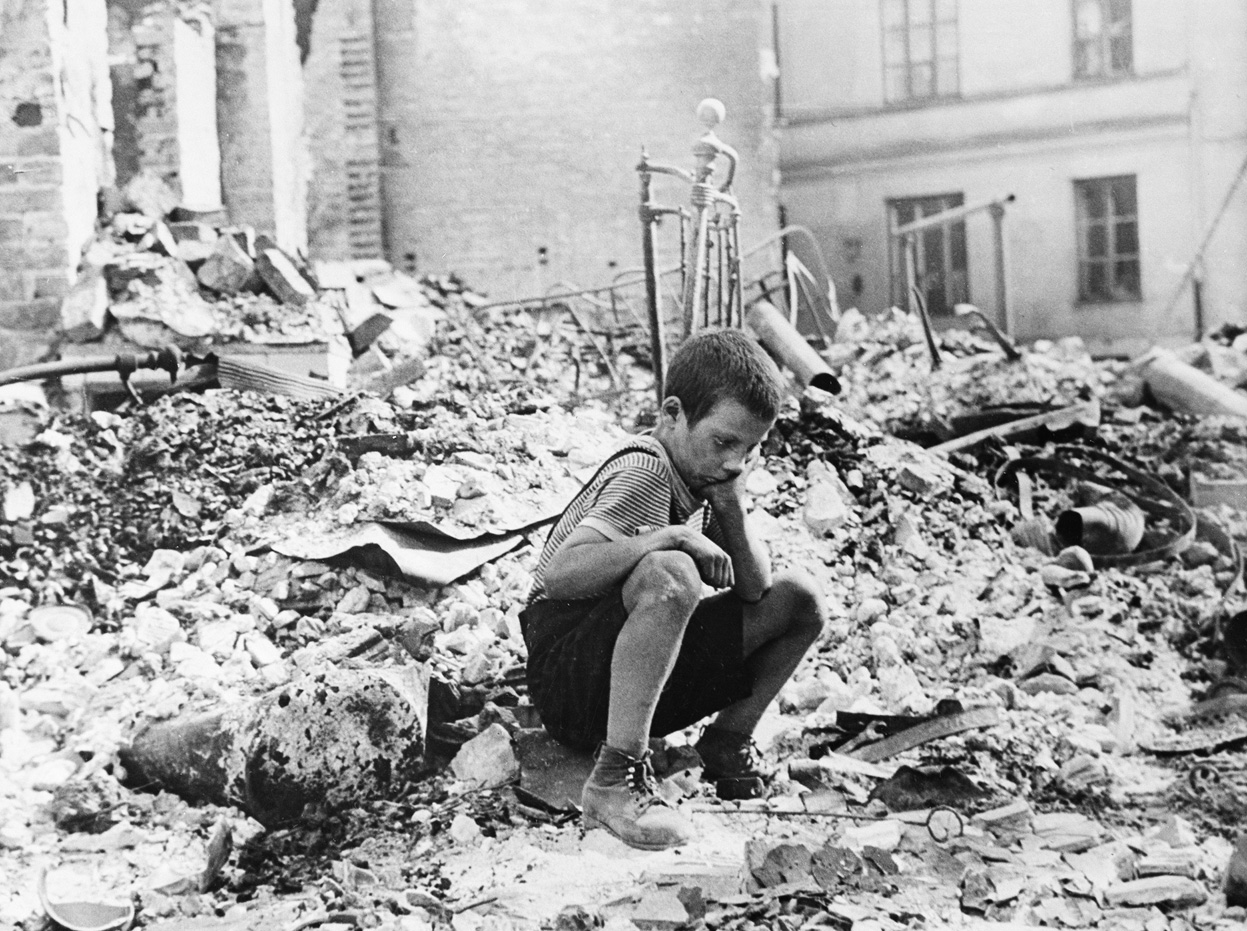
Survivor of the bombing of Warsaw, 1939

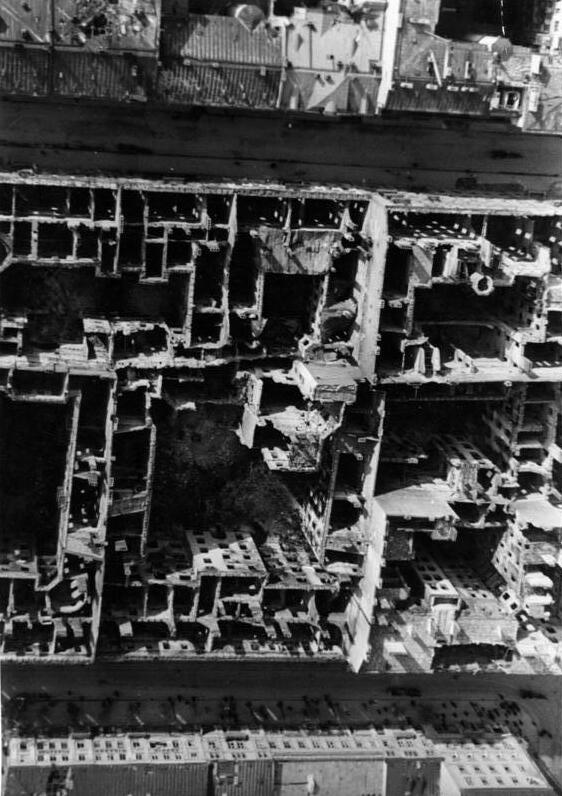
Destroyed city blocks in Warsaw after a German bombing, September 1939

== See also ==
- Air warfare of World War II
- Siege of Warsaw (1939)
- Planned destruction of Warsaw
- Soviet air raids on Warsaw during World War II
