= Warszawa Wileńska railway station =

Railway station in Warsaw, Poland

Warszawa Wileńska
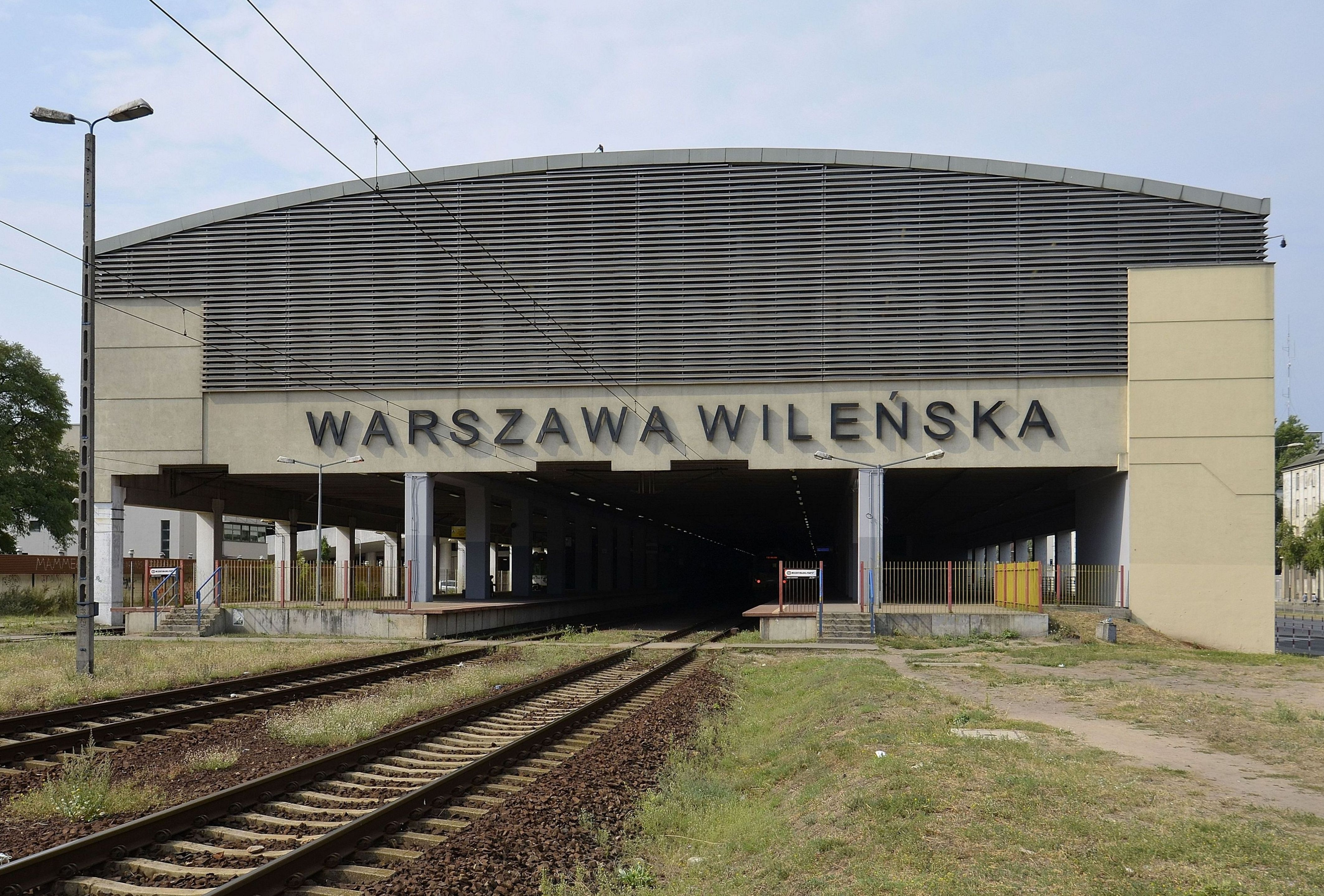

General information
- Location: Białostocka 1 Praga Północ, Warsaw, Masovian; Poland
- Coordinates: 52.2553°N 21.0375°E
- System: B
- Owner: PKP Polskie Linie Kolejowe
- Lines: Route 21 (Warszawa Wileńska - Zielonka)
- Platforms: 2
- Tracks: 3
- Train operators: Masovian Railways
- Connections: Dworzec Wileński metro station

Construction
- Architect: Narcyz Zborzewski (1862); Wacław Szuszkiewicz (1920); Empora - Biuro architektów (2000)

History
- Opened: 1863
- Rebuilt: 1927-28, 1948, 2000
- Electrified: 13 April 1952
- Former names: Petersburg Station (Polish: Dworzec Petersburski); Petrograd Station (Polish: Dworzec Petrogradski)

Services
Preceding station	Masovian Railways	Following station
Terminus	R60	Warszawa Zacisze Wilno towards Czyżew
Terminus	RE60	Warszawa Zacisze Wilno towards Łochów
Location
- Warszawa Wileńska Station within Warsaw

Warszawa Wileńska (English: Warsaw Vilnius Station) is a railway terminal in central Warsaw, Poland. It is situated by Plac Wileński (English: Vilnius Square) in the eastern district of Praga-Północ on the right bank of the River Vistula. Often simply called Dworzec Wileński (English: Vilnius Station) (Note: The denomination Dworzec Wileński (English: the Vilnius Station) is used by the Warsaw Metro as well as the Warsaw Tramway.), the name of the station derives from its past as the main station serving trains towards Vilnius.

The historic terminus of the Saint Petersburg–Warsaw Railway, the station opened in 1863 as the Dworzec Petersburski (English: the Petersburg Station). Destroyed in World War I, it was renamed to its current name and moved to its present location during the interwar period. The current station was built in 2000, replacing various temporary station buildings that had been in use since 1920. It is located in a multi-purpose building which also houses the Galeria Wileńska shopping mall.

Today, the station serves mostly local and suburban trains operated by the regional railway company Masovian Railways (Polish: Koleje Mazowieckie). The station is connected to the Dworzec Wileński metro station of line M2 of the Warsaw Metro. In 2018, an average of 20,000 to 24,000 passengers used the station daily.

== History ==
=== The Petersburg Station ===
==== Background ====
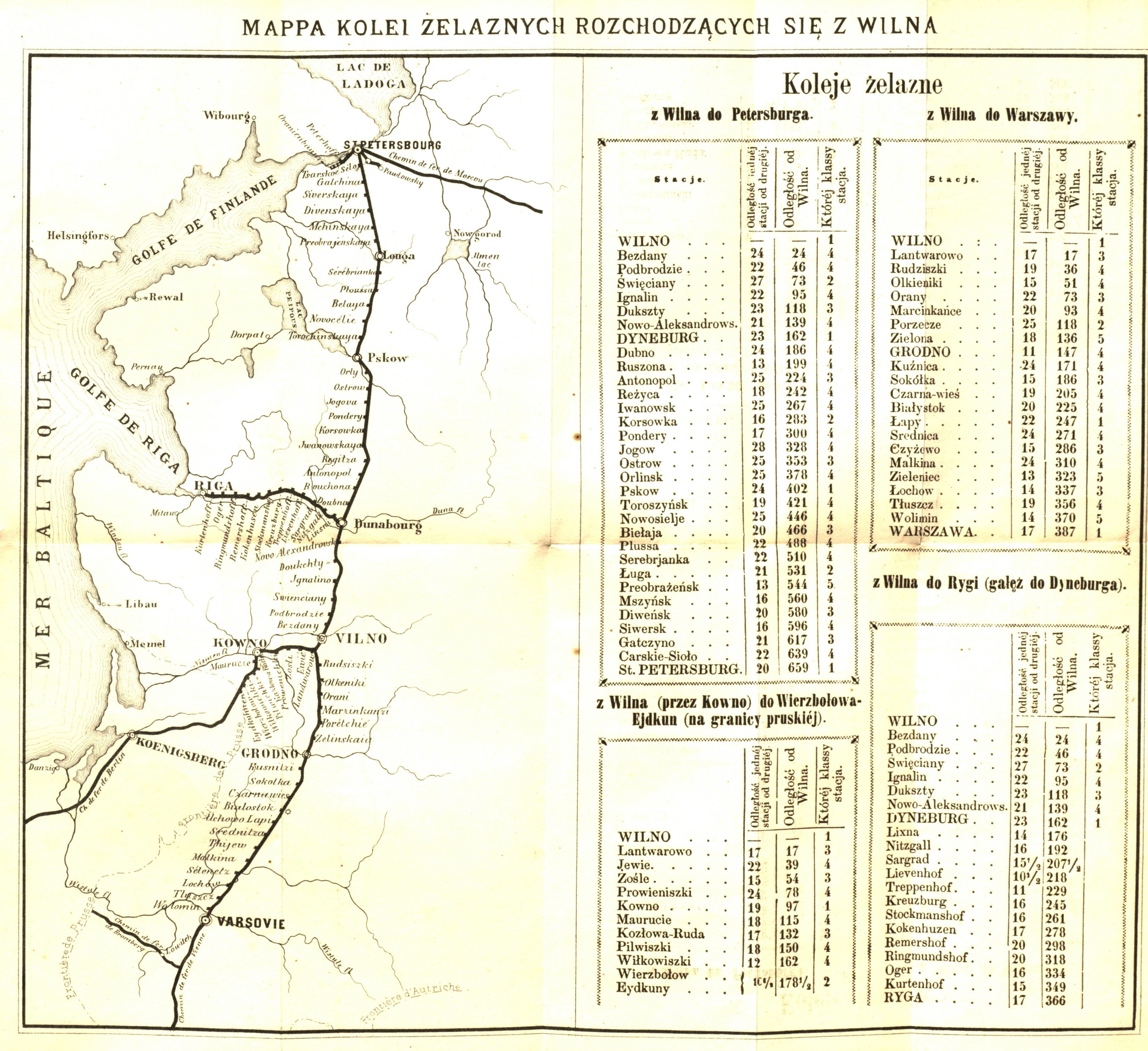
Map of the Saint Petersburg–Warsaw Railway in 1862.

The first station in this location, then called the Petersburg Station (Polish: Dworzec Petersburski), opened in 1863. It served as the southwestern terminus of the Saint Petersburg–Warsaw Railway, a new railway line linking Warsaw with Saint Petersburg via Vilnius and Daugavpils. This 1,333 km (828 mi) long railway line was built by the Russian Empire from 1851 to 1862 in order to connect the Russian capital with Warsaw, the administrative centre of Russian Poland. The new station's counterpart at the other end of the railway line was thus the Warsaw Station (Russian: Варшавский вокзал) in Saint Petersburg.

==== Location ====
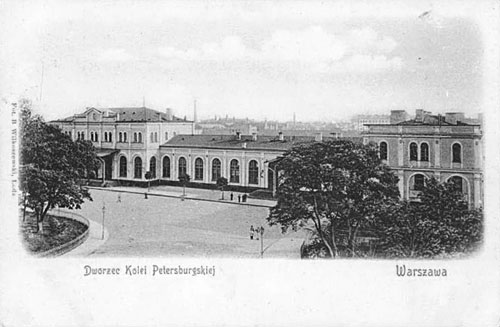
View of the station on an undated postcard from the late 19th century.

The new station was placed in the Praga district of Warsaw, to the east of the River Vistula. The main façade of the station faced the Ulica Wileńska (English: Vilnius Street) which became the main thoroughfare of the Nowa Praga district, which developed around the station. Between the station building and the street was a spacious driveway, known as the Foksal. (Note: The origin of the term is thought to be a reference to the Vauxhall station or the amusement park Vauxhall Gardens.) The center of the building's facade was located approximately at the level of today's Ulica Zaokopowa.

==== Architecture ====
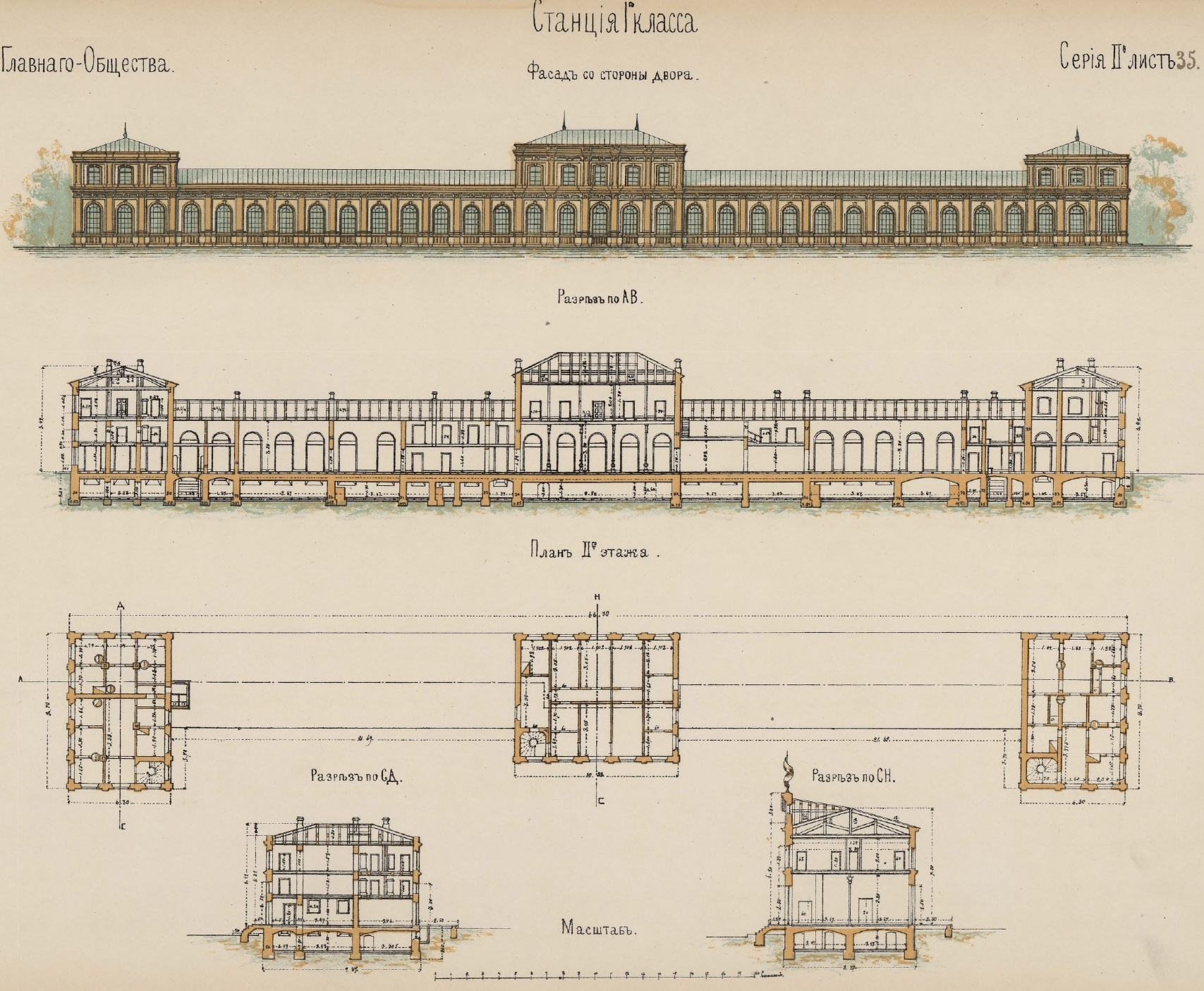
Floor plan, cross-section and facade of the station building, 1872.

The station building itself was built between 1859 and 1861 to designs by the architect Narcyz Zborzewski, a Russian architect of Polish origins who was a graduate of the Imperial Academy of Arts in Saint Petersburg. The building was a massive structure, situated parallel to the railway tracks, in the style of Saint Petersburg Neoclassicism. It was a single-story building, with 33 window bays across its entire width. The central building and the two buildings at the ends of the wings were two and three stories high respectively. From the street side, the complex resembled a large palace.

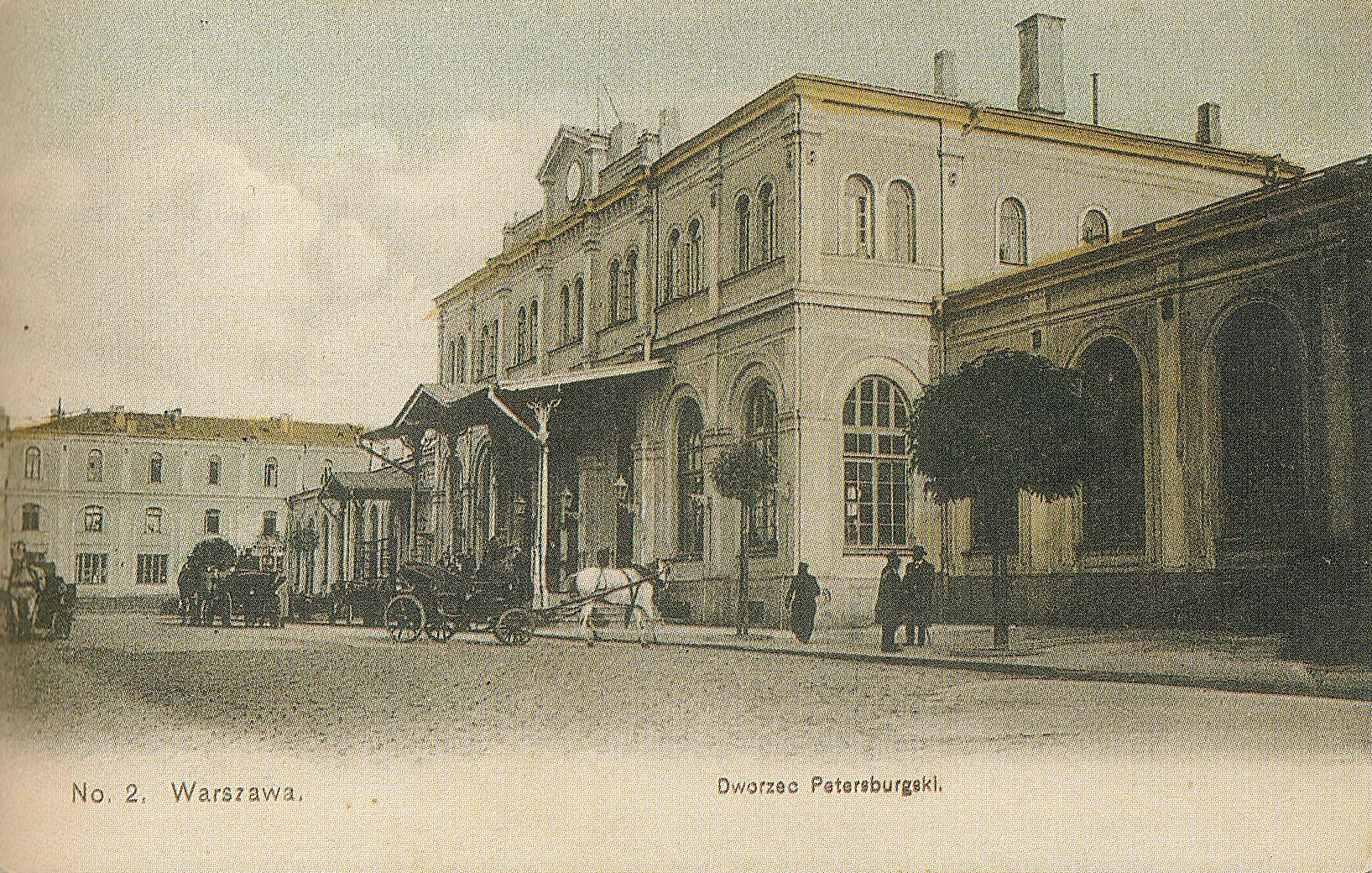
The Petersburg Station in 1908.

The architecture of the building was not positively reviewed by contemporary media. The building was designed in the then already outdated arcade style. The windows were semicircular in shape. In the center of the metal roof of the central building there was a tympanum in the gable triangle, which contained a station clock. The main entrance to the station building was covered by a cast-iron canopy. The station building contained a ticket hall, restaurants and waiting rooms for the different classes.

==== Connections ====
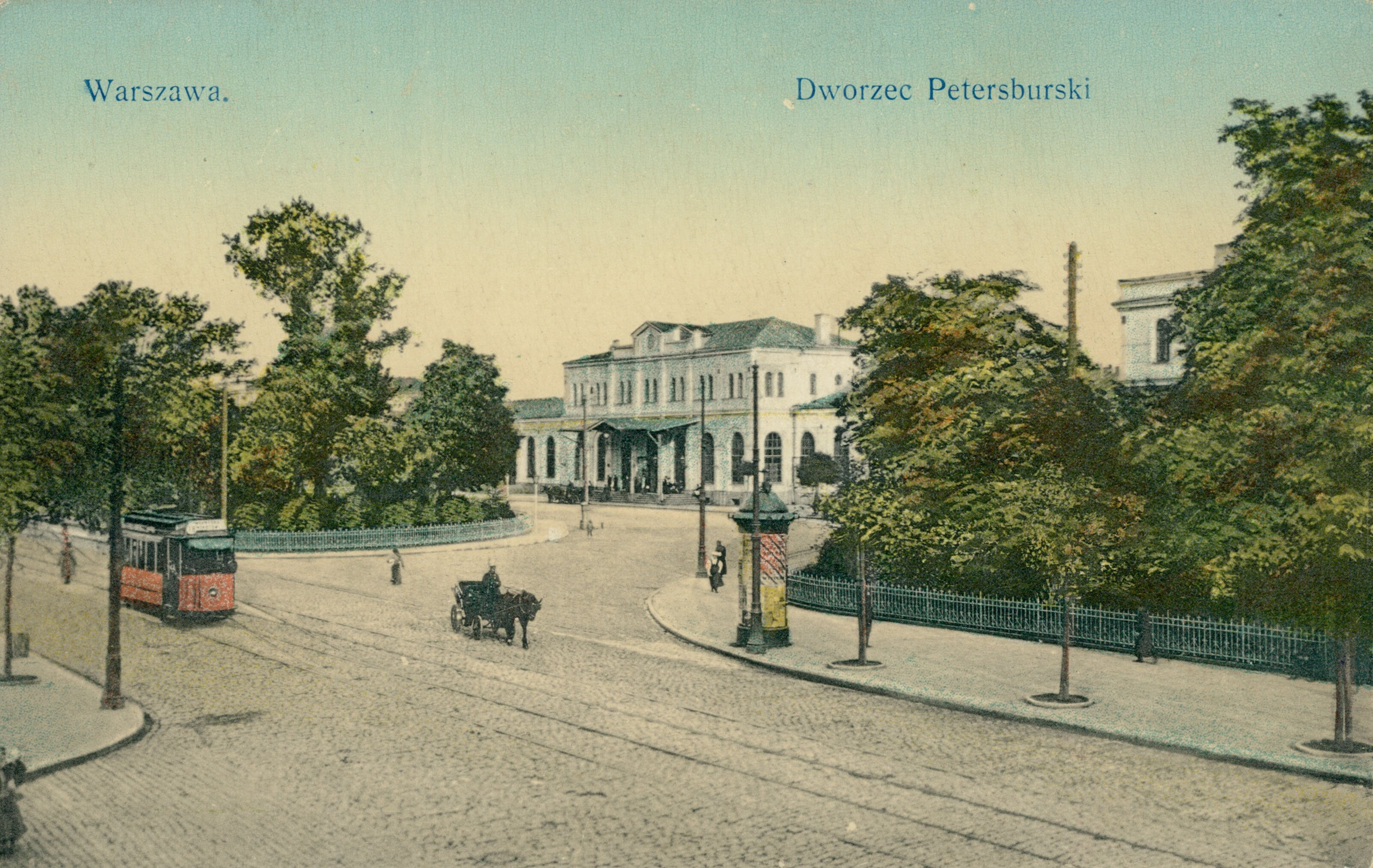
View of the station and the Ulica Wileńska on a postcard from 1912.

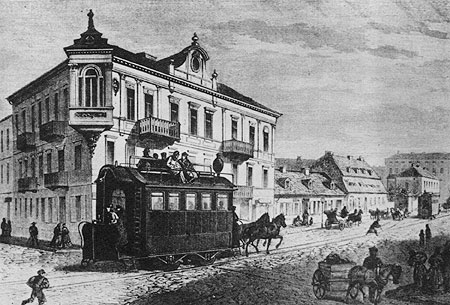
The horse-drawn tramway on Marszałkowska Street in 1867

The Petersburg Station was Warsaw's second railway station after the Vienna Station, which had been completed in 1845 on the left side of the Vistula as the northeastern terminus of the Warsaw–Vienna Railway. As the Saint Petersburg–Warsaw Railway used russian gauge while the Warsaw–Vienna Railway used standard gauge, the two could not be connected. To allow passengers travelling between Vienna and Saint Petersburg easier transfer between both rail terminals, a 6 km (3.7 mi) long horse-drawn tramway line between the Petersburg Station and the Vienna Station which crossed the Vistula over the Kierbedź Bridge was opened soon after the railway line's completion in December 1866, thus giving birth to Warsaw's tramway network.

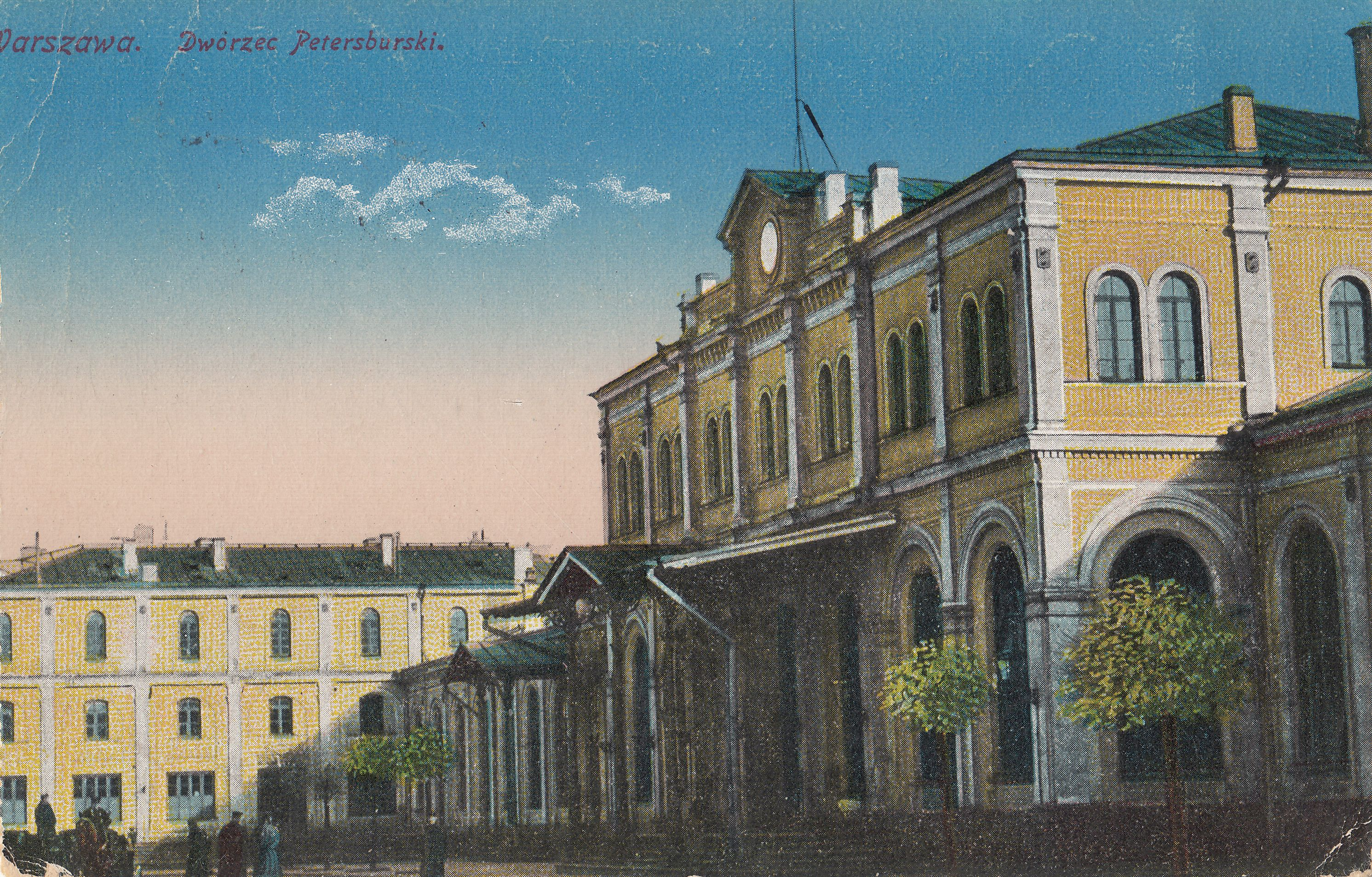
View of the station on an undated postcard, before 1916.

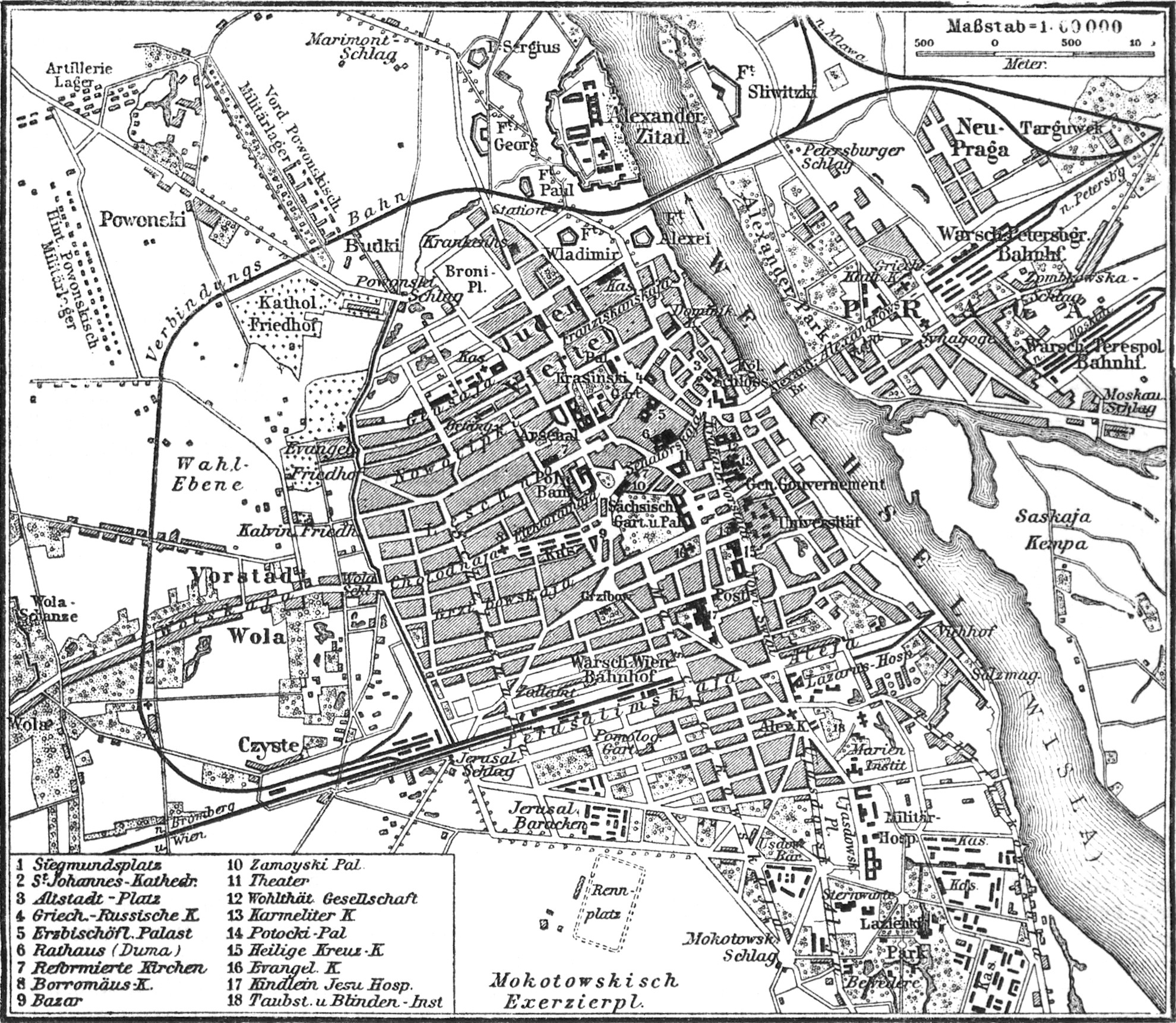
Map of Warsaw in 1890 with the Vienna Station (center bottom), the Petersburg Station (upper right) and the railway line connecting the two across the Vistula.

Between 1873 and 1875, a rail bridge, the Citadel Rail Bridge (Polish: Most kolejowy przy Cytadeli), was finally built across the River Vistula near the Warsaw Citadel in the northern part of the city. It opened in November 1875, allowing the Kolej obwodowa w Warszawie to connect the right bank Petersburg Station with the left bank Vienna Station, and the Warsaw–Vienna Railway. The railway track had four rails arranged in such a way that it could be used by the broad-gauge trains used on the Saint Petersburg–Warsaw Railway, as well as the standard-gauge trains used on the Warsaw–Vienna line.

==== World War I ====
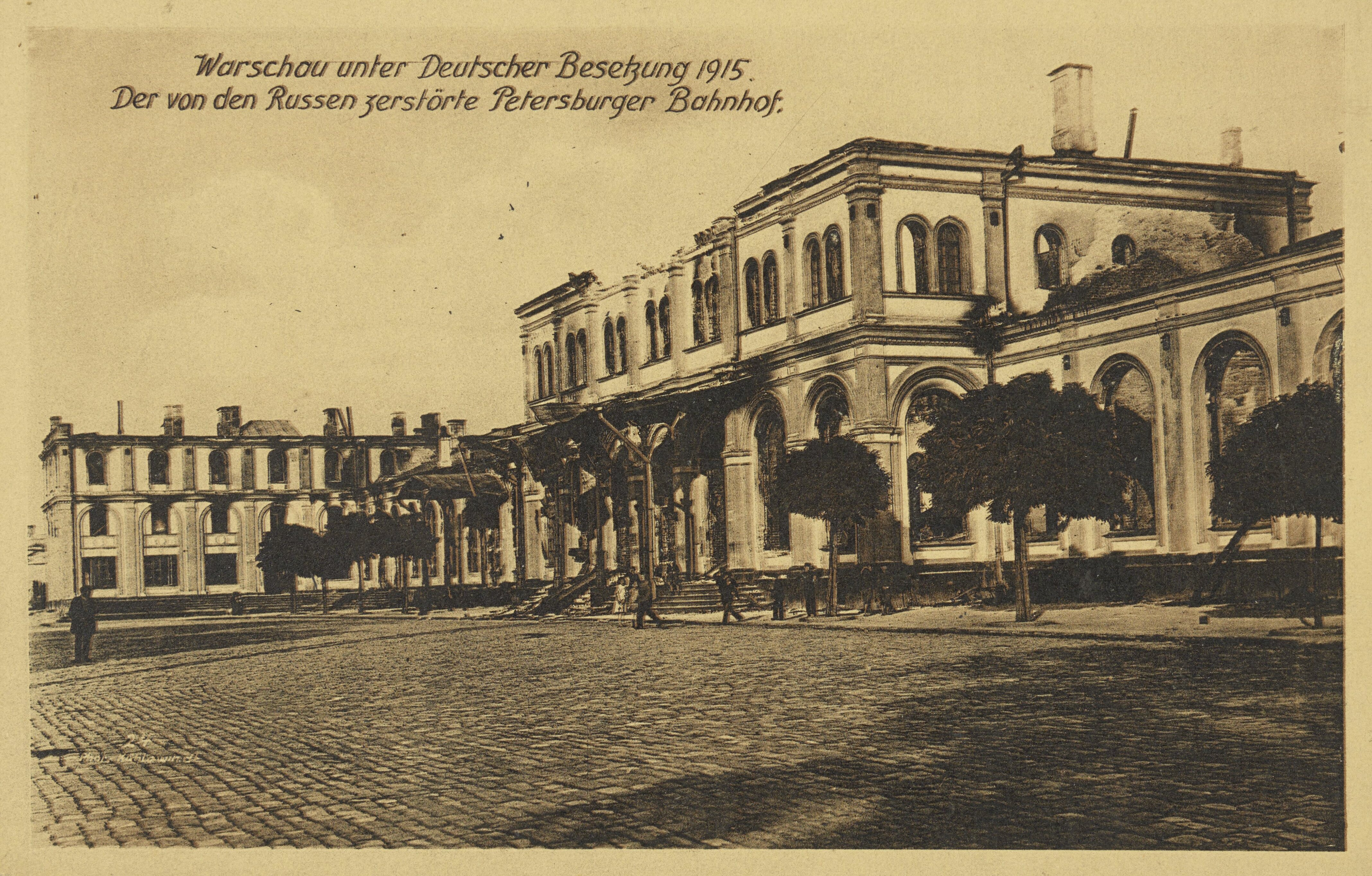
The burned out station building in 1915.

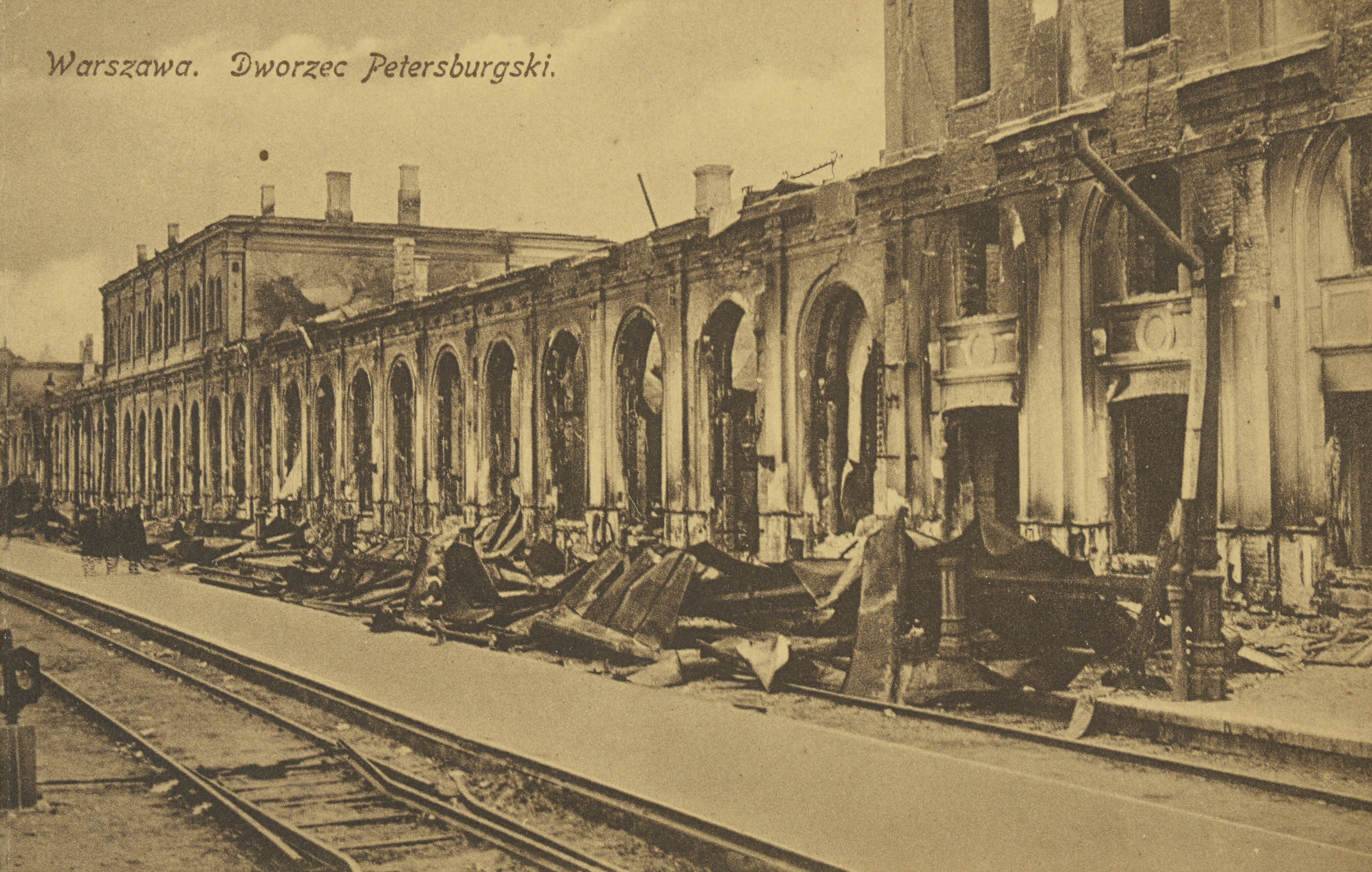
The destroyed platform side of the station in 1915.

Soon after the start of World War I, the Petersburg Station was renamed the Petrograd Station (Polish: Dworzec Petrogradski) as a consequence of the city of Saint Petersburg being renamed Petrograd.

In August 1915, the station building was blown up by withdrawing Russian troops during the Great Retreat, and burned down in the ensuing fire.

=== Interwar period ===
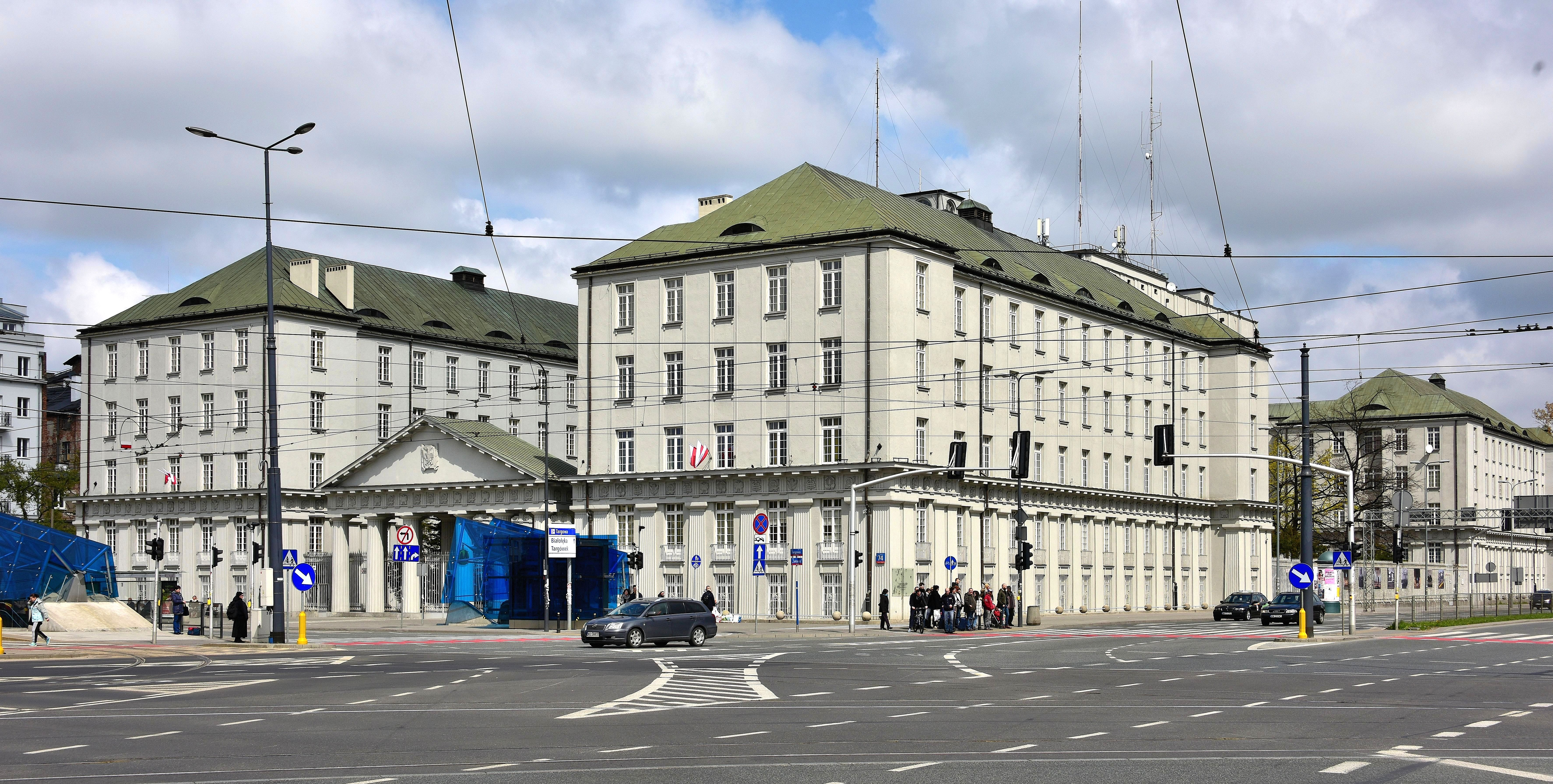
The building of the Polish State Railways, completed in 1928 at the site of the old Petersburg Station.

After the end of hostilities, the old station was not rebuilt. Instead, the ruins were demolished and the track system was removed. The site occupied by the former Petersburg Station was used for the construction of the new office building headquarters of the Polish State Railways, built between 1927 and 1928 to a somewhat controversial design by the architect Marian Lalewicz. Today the building is the headquarters of the PKP Polskie Linie Kolejowe, the Polish railway infrastructure manager, at Ulica Targowa 74.

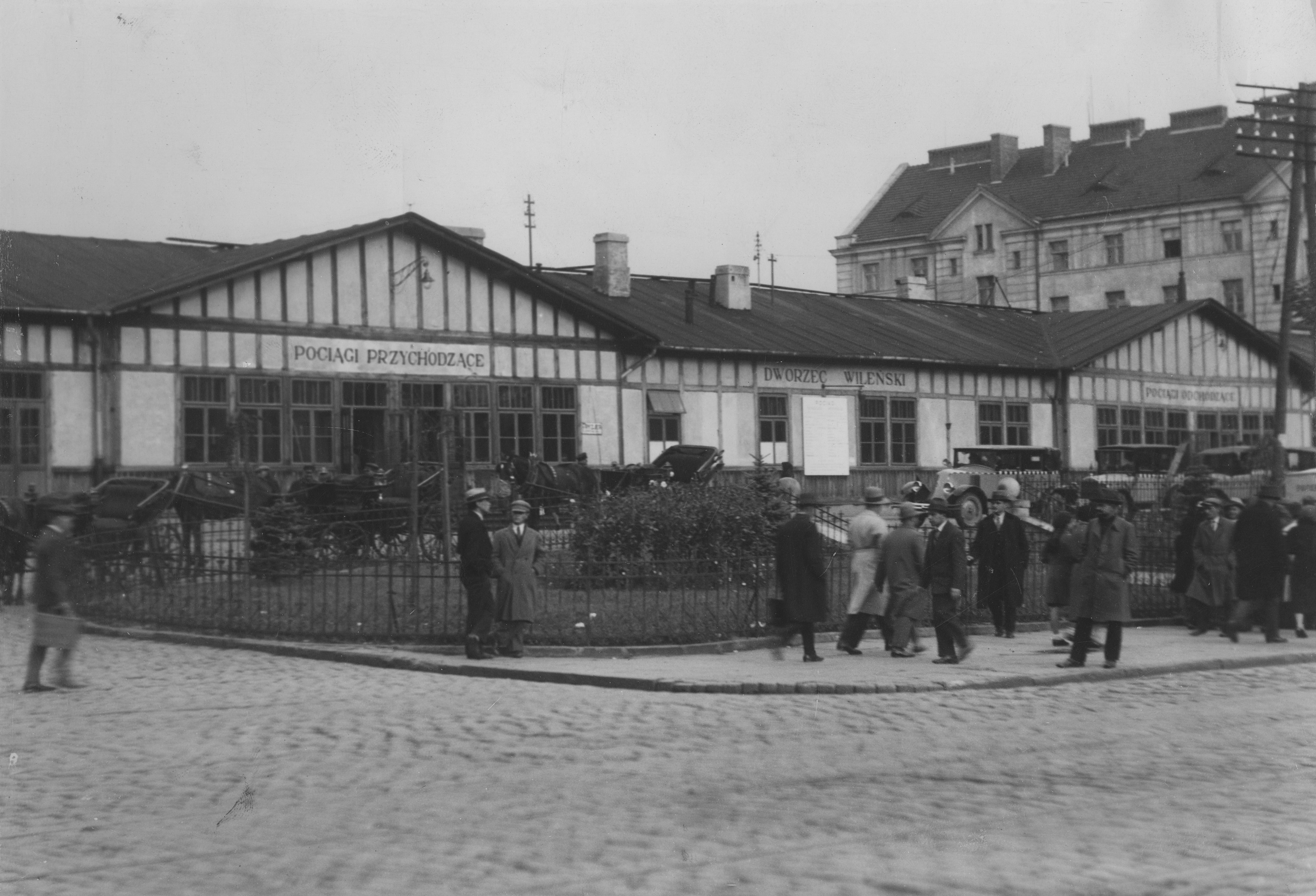
The interwar station building seen from Ulica Targowa in 1932.

Instead, the railway station operations were moved across the street to a location approximately 400 meters south of the original location of the station. The architect Wacław Szuszkiewicz was commissioned to design a new temporary station building. Within three months in 1920, this provisional single-story, half-timbered building with a sheet metal roof, was erected. Unlike the old station building, it was not situated parallel, but perpendicular to the tracks and extended along the Ulica Targowa.

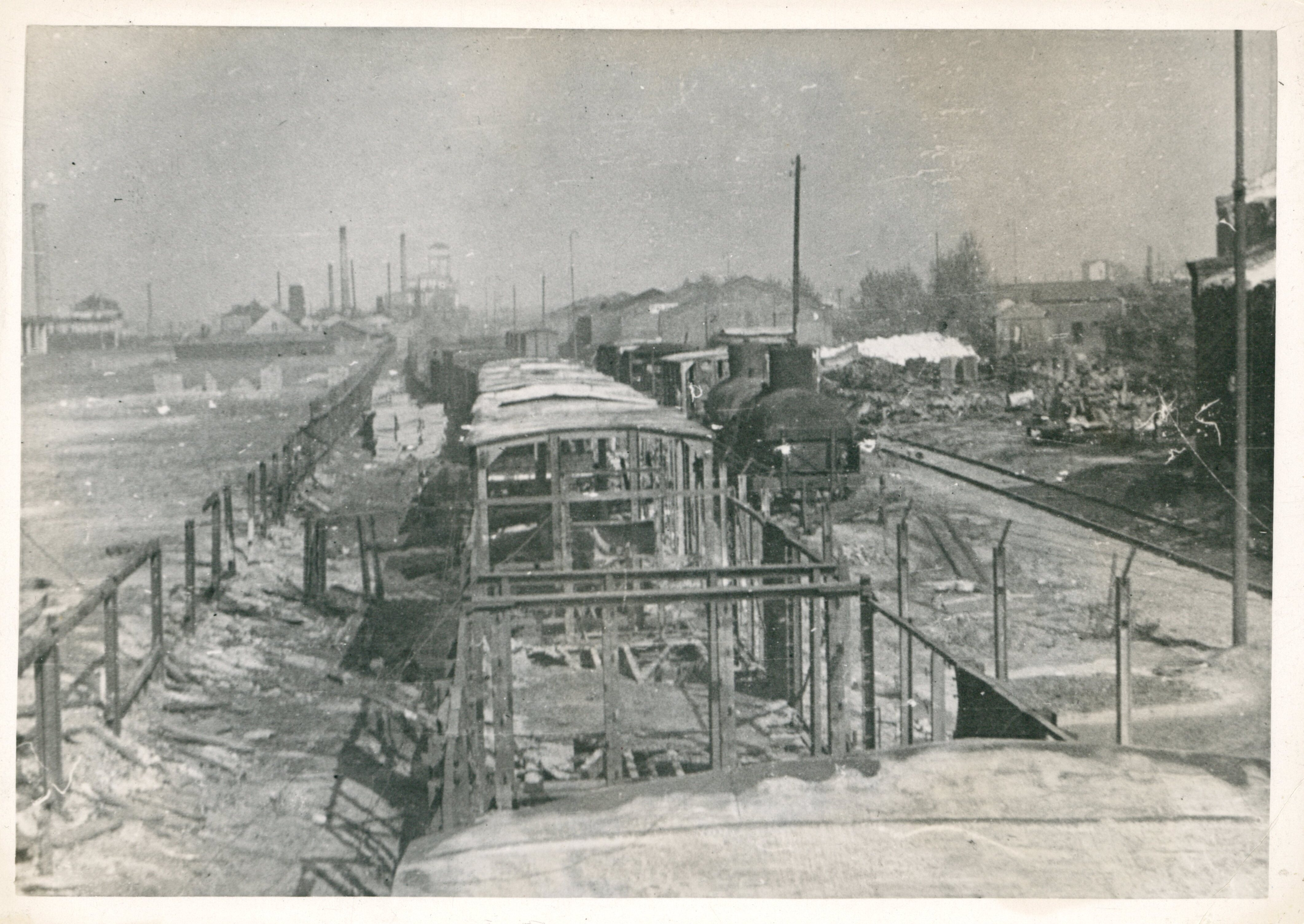
The damaged station during World War II, c. 1939.

After the end of World War I and the Polish-Soviet War, the section between Warsaw and Vilnius of the Warsaw–Saint Petersburg Railway were converted to standard gauge like all broad-gauge railways in interwar Poland. Passenger traffic between Warsaw and then-Soviet Leningrad practically ceased. As the connection to Vilnius now had priority, the name of the station was changed to the Vilnius Station (Polish: Dworzec Wileński). From 1923 onwards, it was called Warszawa Wileńska, the name that is currently used.

During World War II, the provisional station building was damaged during the fighting in 1939 and burned down in the final stages of the war. The remains were dismantled.

=== Post-war period ===
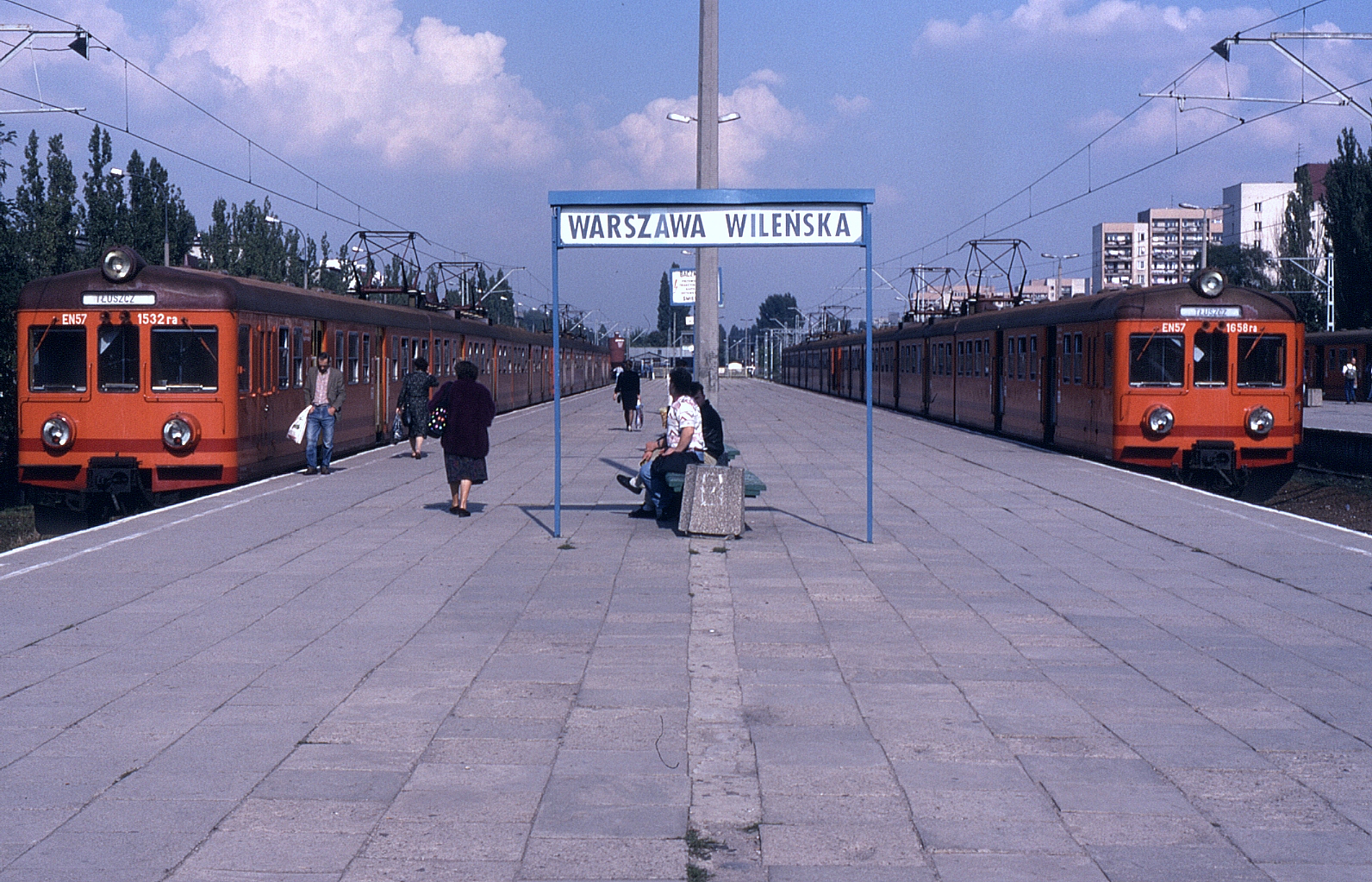
The platform of the post-war station in 1995.

One of the first major post-World War II infrastructure projects in Warsaw, carried out during 1947-1949, was the creation of the East-West Route (Polish: Trasa Wschód–Zachód) of which the current Aleja "Solidarności" was built through the original railway area in 1949. As a consequence, the passenger rail traffic was moved further south to the tracks of the former freight yard. Former warehouse buildings on the southern side of the railway tracks facing the Ulica Białostocka were converted to a station building with passenger facilities in 1947. Access to the waiting hall and ticket counters was also via Ulica Białostocka. This solution was also meant to be provisional, but survived nonetheless in its role until 2000.

In the 1970s and 1980s, trains departed from the Vilnius Station to Gołdap, Hajnówka, and Łomża. Later, long-distance travel from the station declined and was eventually limited to local and suburban traffic.

=== Recent history ===
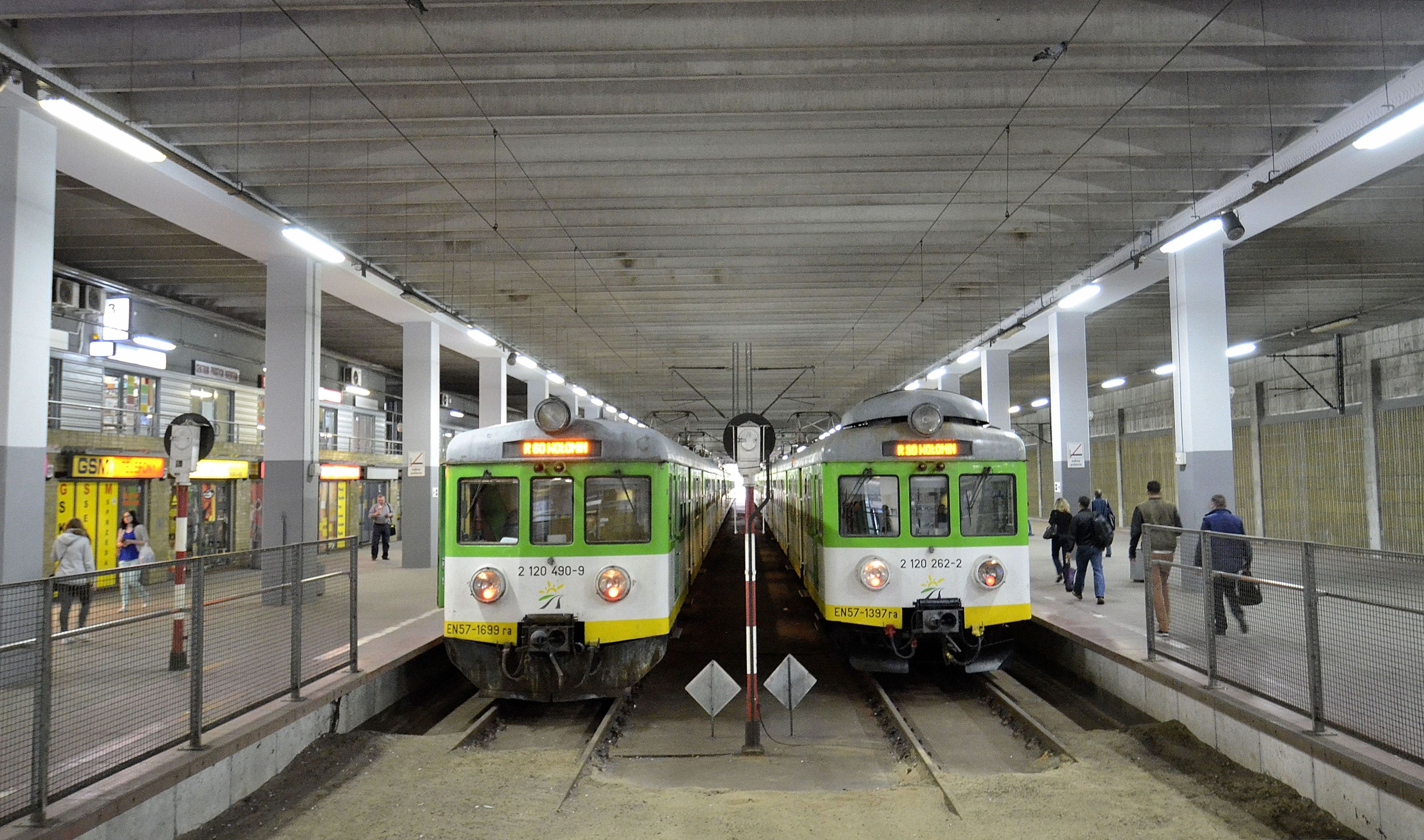
The platforms of the current station in 2015.

In 2000, the provisional station building was finally replaced when a new multi-purpose building designed by the architectural firm Empora was built on the roughly 25,000 m^{2} (270,000 sq ft) site between Aleja "Solidarności", Ulica Targowa and Ulica Białostocka which was completed in 2002. The building houses offices, the Galeria Wileńska shopping mall, and an underground parking garage. The Warszawa Wileńska railway station is integrated into the ground floor and has two 213 m (699 ft) long platforms with three tracks, which serve the suburban trains operated currently by Masovian Railways.

In March 2015, the construction of the adjacent metro station Dworzec Wileński of line M2 of the Warsaw Metro was completed. Equipped with two exits located in Ulica Targowa it connects Warszawa Wileńska station to the Warsaw Metro.

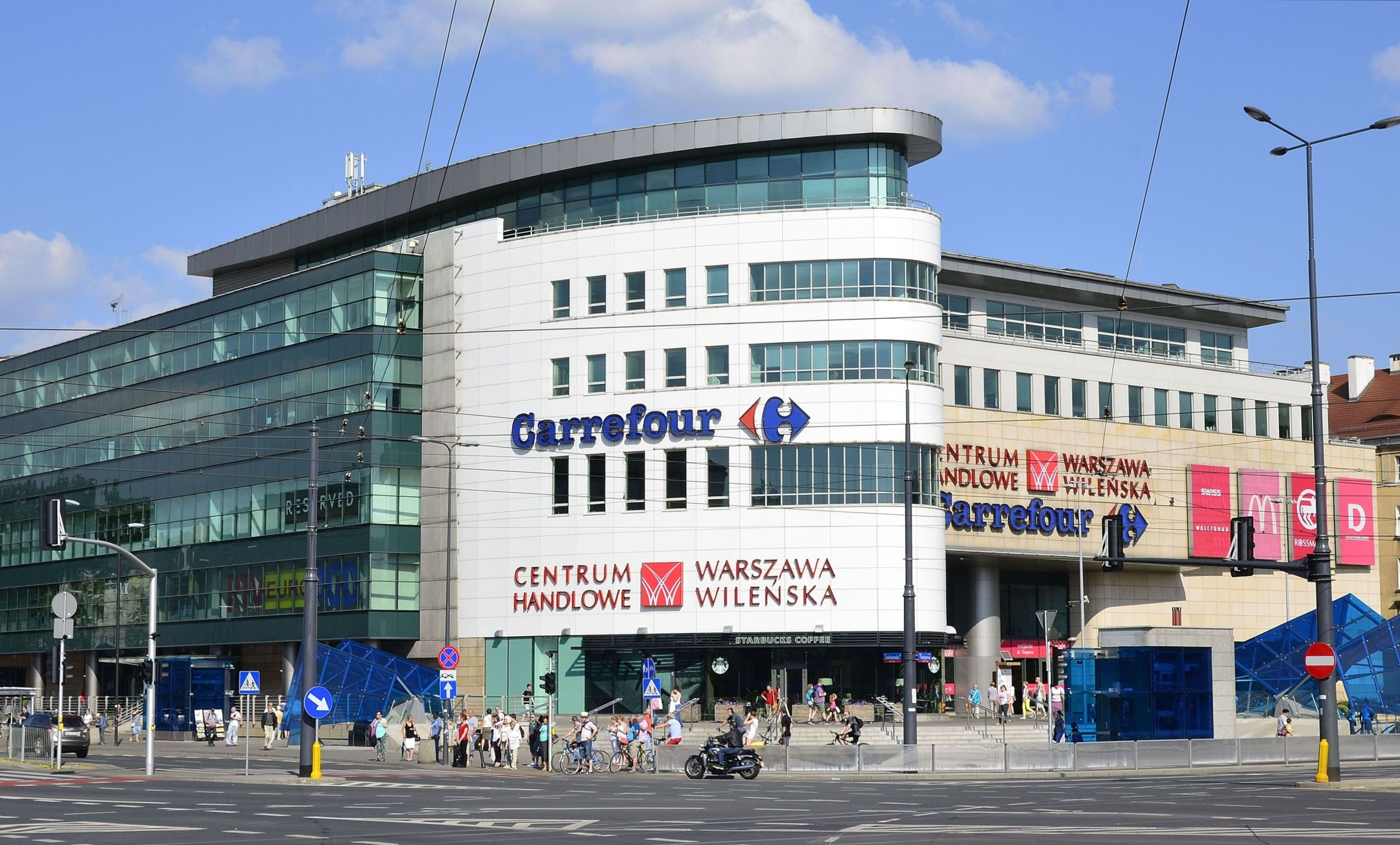
The new building in 2015.

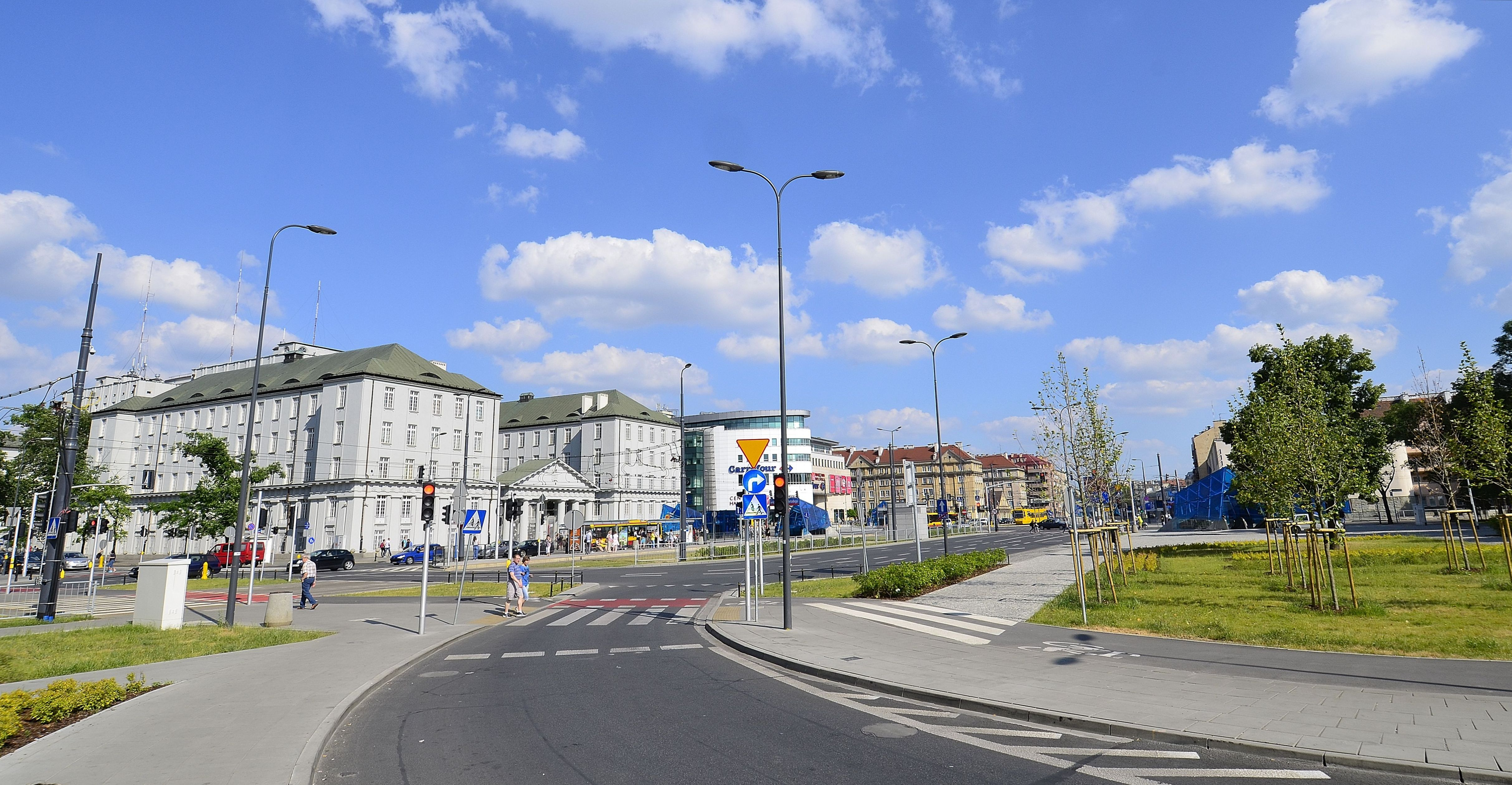
View from Wileński square.

== See also ==
- Rail transport in Poland
- List of busiest railway stations in Poland
