= Polish Republics =

Four states have borne the name Polish Republic (Rzeczpospolita Polska):

- The First Polish Republic, applied retrospectively to the Polish–Lithuanian Commonwealth (1569–1795)
- Second Polish Republic (1918–1939)
- Polish People's Republic (1952–1989)
- Third Polish Republic (since 1989)

== See also ==
- Proposed Fourth Polish Republic
- Rzeczpospolita
