= Ludwik Maurycy Landau =

Polish economist and statistician

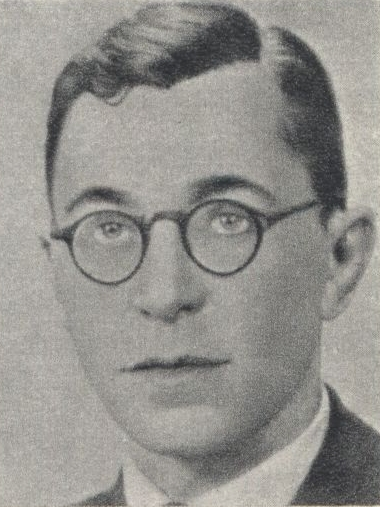
- Born: 31 May 1902; Tomaszów Mazowiecki, Congress Poland
- Died: 29 February 1944 (aged 41); Warsaw, occupied Poland

Academic background
- Education: Warsaw University

Academic work
- Discipline: Macroeconomics
- Notable ideas: social income distribution in Poland

Ludwik Maurycy Landau (31 May 1902 in Tomaszów Mazowiecki – 29 February 1944) was a Polish economist and statistician, a member of the Polish resistance movement in World War II, and a victim of the Holocaust.

== Life ==
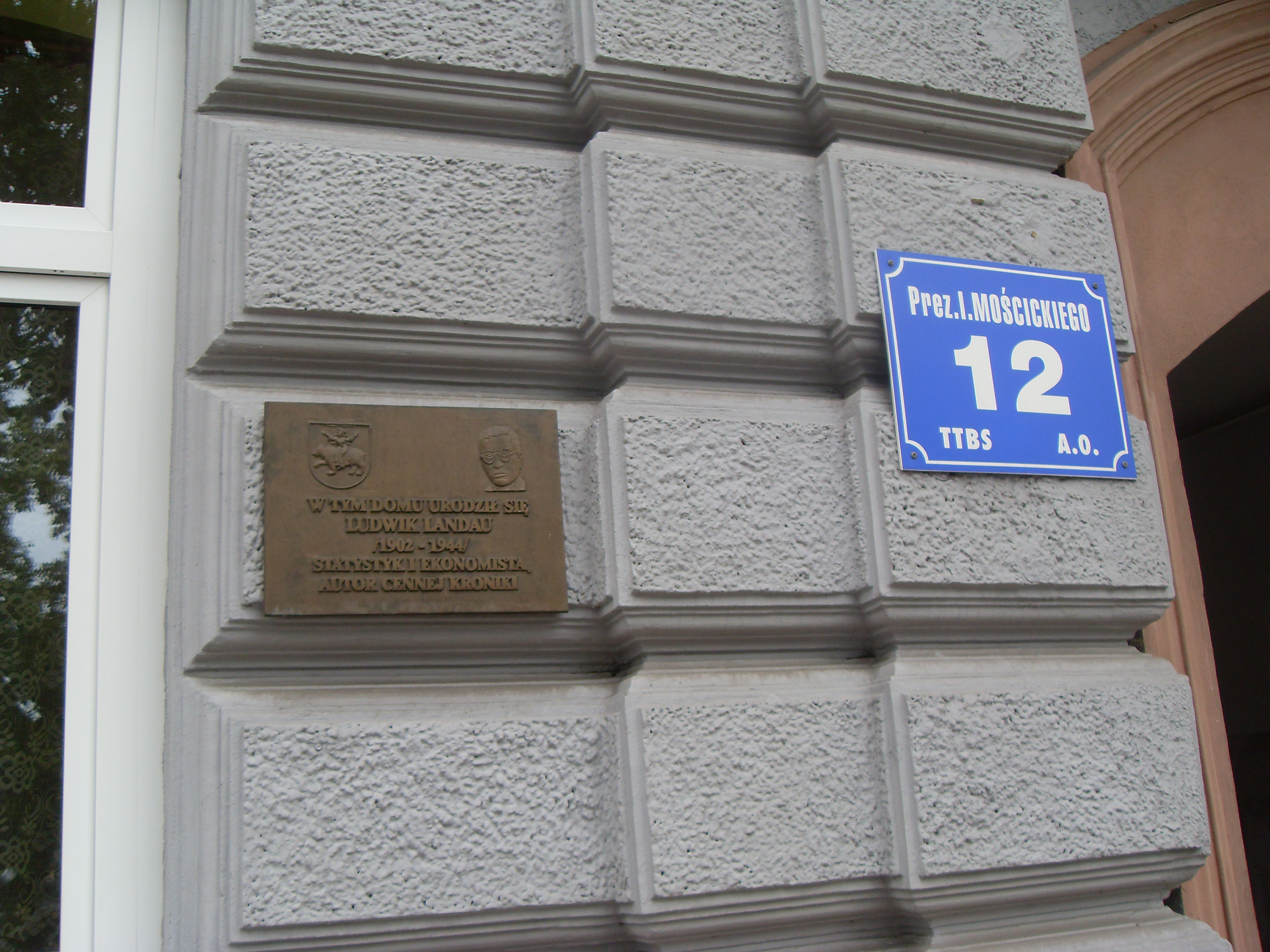
Birthplace plaque

Ludwik Maurycy Landau was born into a family of intelligentsia in Tomaszów Mazowiecki on 31 May 1902. He graduated in law at Warsaw University. After graduation he was employed at the Central Statistical Office and at the Institute for Research into Business Cycles and Prices (Instytut Badań Koniunktur Gospodarczych i Cen) and the Institute of Social Economy (Instytut Gospodarstwa Społecznego). His study on social income in Poland around 1929–1933, co-authored with Michał Kalecki, was pioneering.

Landau's 1936 firing from the Institute for Research into Business Cycles and Prices (together with Kalecki and Marek Breit) was seen as politically motivated and engineered by a senior member of the Polish government, the economist and politician Eugeniusz Kwiatkowski.

During the German invasion of Poland and the siege of Warsaw, Landau took part in civil defense. During the subsequent occupation, he continued his research. He participated in underground education programs and worked with the Polish Underground State, preparing reports on the status of the wartime Polish economy. He supported the wartime Polish Socialist Party – Freedom, Equality, Independence, helped design their early wartime manifesto on the economy, and in 1940–1942 edited their underground newspaper.

In August 1940 he was forced to move to the newly created Warsaw Ghetto. He was able to escape from the ghetto with his family and spent the next couple of years in hiding in the city's Włochy district. Around 1943 and 1944 he was blackmailed by szmalcowniks. On 29 February 1944, after leaving home, he went missing; in the next days, the Gestapo arrested his family; his daughter committed suicide, and his wife was shot.

== Works ==
Landau published a number of academic papers and studies pertaining to economics and law. One of his areas of expertise was the distribution of gross national income among the social classes.

From the start of the occupation, Landau kept a diary discussing the effects of the wartime conditions on the Polish people, including the country's Jews. The diary contained valuable statistical data. It survived the war and was published in three volumes (1962–1963) as Kronika lat wojny i okupacji (Chronicle of the Wartime Occupation); it has been called "an important source for understanding living conditions during World War II from a social-science perspective".

== See also ==
- List of Poles
