= Tomasz Szarota =

Polish historian and publicist (1940–2026)

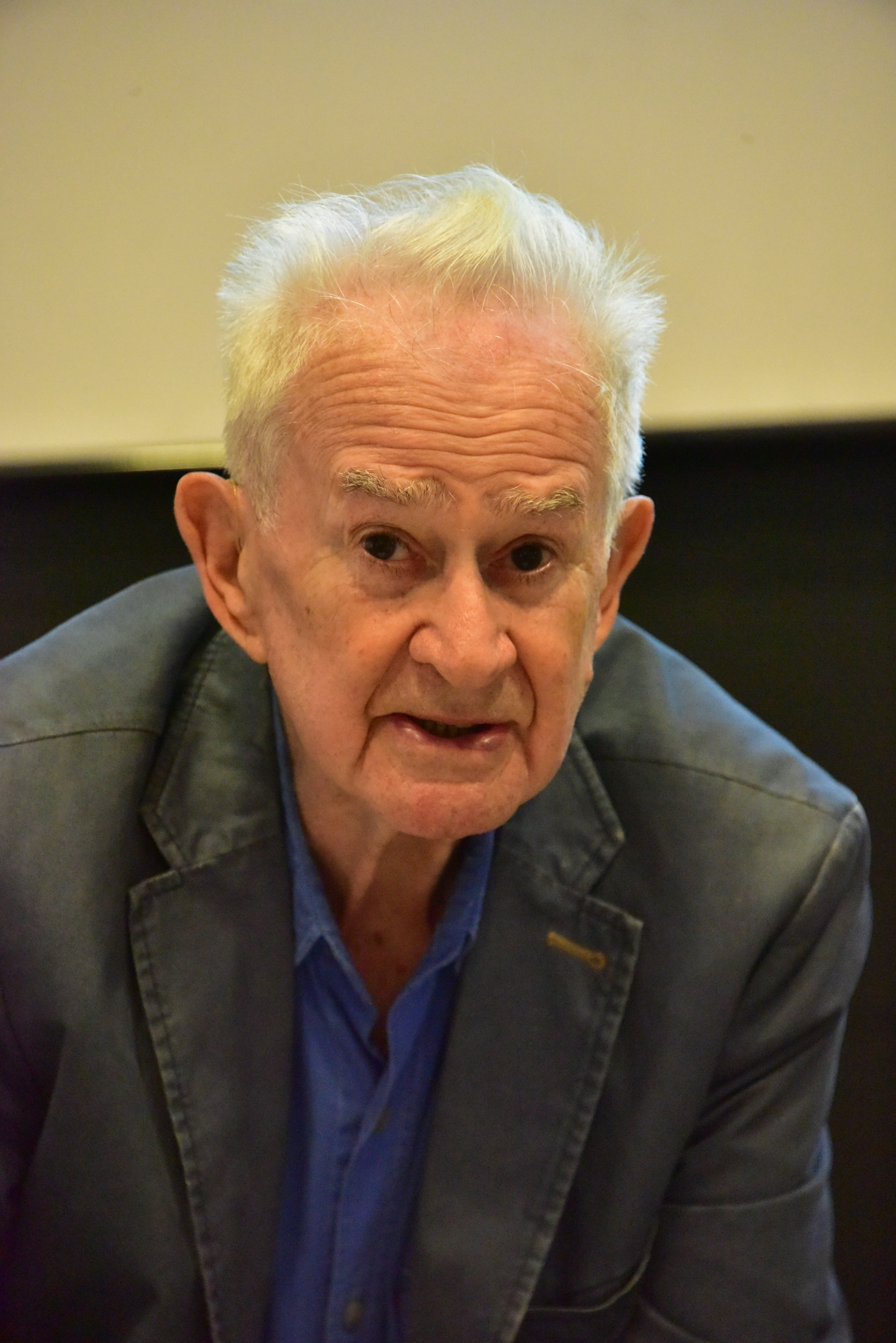
Szarota in 2024

Tomasz Marceli Szarota (2 January 1940 – 11 August 2026) was a Polish historian and publicist. As a historian, his areas of expertise were related to history of World War II, and everyday life in occupied Poland, in particular, in occupied Warsaw and other occupied major European cities.

His work appeared in scholarly journals, as well as in mainstream newspapers (Rzeczpospolita) and magazines (Polityka). He also wrote several books, and received numerous awards for his research and writings.

Szarota died on 11 August 2026, at the age of 86.

== Works ==
- Osadnictwo miejskie na Dolnym Śląsku w latach 1945–1948, Zakład Narodowy im. Ossolińskich – Wydawnictwo PAN, Wrocław 1969
- Okupowanej Warszawy dzień powszedni, Czytelnik, Warszawa 1973 ISBN 83-07-01224-4; German translation: Warschau unter dem Hakenkreuz. Leben und Alltag im besetzten Warschau 1.10.1939 bis 31.7.1944, Schöningh Verlag, ISBN 3-506-77472-7
- Stefan Rowecki „Grot”, Państwowe Wydawnictwo Naukowe, Warszawa 1983, ISBN 83-01-04578-7
- Niemiecki Michel. Dzieje narodowego symbolu i stereotypu, Państwowe Wydawnictwo Naukowe, Warszawa 1988, ISBN 83-01-08352-2; German translation: Der deutsche Michel. Die Geschichte eines nationalen Symbols und Autostereotyps, transl. Kordula Zentgraf-Zubrzycka, Fibre 1998, ISBN 3-929759-38-1
- V – jak zwycięstwo. Symbole, znaki, demonstracje patriotyczne walczącej Europy 1939–1945, Wydawnictwa Szkolne i Pedagogiczne, Warszawa 1994, ISBN 83-02-05356-2
- Życie codzienne w stolicach okupowanej Europy. Szkice historyczne. Kronika wydarzeń, Państwowy Instytut Wydawniczy, Warszawa 1995, ISBN 83-06-02410-9)
- Niemcy i Polacy. Wzajemne postrzeganie i stereotypy, Wydawnictwo Naukowe PWN, Warszawa 1996
- U progu Zagłady. Zajścia antyżydowskie i pogromy w okupowanej Europie, Wydawnictwo Sic! Warszawa 2000, ISBN 83-86056-74-6
- Der Beginn der Vernichtung. Zum Mord an den Juden in Jedwabne und Umgebung im Sommer 1941 (with Edmund Dmitrów and Paweł Machcewicz), fibre Verlag, Osnabrück 2004, ISBN 3-929759-87-X
- Karuzela na placu Krasińskich. Studia i szkice z lat wojny i okupacji, Oficyna Wydawnicza „Rytm” – Fundacja Historia i Kultura, Warszawa 2007, ISBN 978-83-7399-259-7
- Die Deutschen in den Augen der Polen während des Zweiten Weltkrieges, Fundacja Polsko-Niemieckie Pojednanie, Warszawa 2009, ISBN 978-83-922446-7-7
- Stereotype und Konflikte. Historische Studien zu den deutsch-polnischen Beziehungen, fibre Verlag, Osnabrück 2010, ISBN 978-3-938400-45-6
- Tajemnica śmierci Stefana Starzyńskiego, Bellona, Warszawa 2020, ISBN 978-83-11-15753-8
