= Rzeczpospolita Polska (magazine) =

Rzeczpospolita Polska was the official monthly underground journal and mouthpiece of the Government Delegation for Poland, the highest authority of the Polish Underground State, accountable to the Polish government-in-exile located in London during the wartime occupation of its territory by two hostile powers. According to the historian Lewandowska, it acted as "a source of instruction and information" for Polish underground organizations in the field, including other underground publications, operating in occupied Poland. It was staffed by a network of professional writers both in Poland and correspondents in exile.

The first issue of Rzeczpospolita Polska was published in Poland on 15 March 1941, and the final one in July 1945, at the point when the Council of National Unity and the Government Delegation were disbanded. The print run of the journal varied from about 3,500 to 16,000 copies. Over its five years of existence, 80 issues were published. A Russian source claims it was published fortnightly. It was also published in Warsaw, and after the fall of the Warsaw Uprising, it was published for a brief period as a daily in Kraków.

The first issue had twenty pages and included the following articles: Independent Rzeczpospolita exits and fights, Belief in victory, Treuga Dei in Poland, Cynicism, provocation and crime, and regular columns on Polish issues abroad, A Foreign chronicle, and From the lands of Rzeczpospolita.

The journal was divided into six sections:

- I: official declarations, statements and communications from the Delegate
- II: articles representing views of the Delegature
- III: materials on the activities of the Polish government-in-exile, and on the Polish Forces in the West
- IV: international news, and the progress of the war
- V: reports on the situation in the territories annexed by Nazi Germany and in the territories annexed by the Soviet Union. Later this would be expanded to dedicated supplements
- VI: overview of other interesting articles from the underground.

The first chief editor was Stanisław Kauzik, replaced by Franciszek Głowiński, nom de guerre, "Tadeusz Bronicz", "Czołowski". Głowiński was arrested on 2 February 1944, and replaced by Teofil Syga, nom de guerre, "Cedro", "Grudzień". Other members of the editorial board included Tadeusz Kolski, Witold Żarski, Stefan Krzywoszewski, Marian Grzegorczyk, Zbigniew Kunicki and Jan Mosiński, Witold Giełżyński, Tadeusz Kobylański and Kazimierz Koźniewski. The journal was supported by writers such as Andrzej Tretiak, Wacław Borowy and Zygmunt Wojciechowski.
