= List of bridges in Poland =

This is a list of bridges in Poland.

== Bolesławiec ==
- Bolesławiec rail viaduct

== Bydgoszcz ==
- Fordoński Bridge
- Esperanto Bridge

== Gdańsk ==
- Third Millennium John Paul II Bridge

== Grudziądz ==
- Bridge near Grudziądz

== Kraków ==
- Bridge across the Nowohucka Route
- Dębnicki Bridge
- Grunwaldzki Bridge in Kraków
- Kotlarski Bridge
- Powstańców Śląskich Bridge
- Zwierzyniecki Bridge in Kraków

== Konin ==
- Bridge of the European Union (Most Unii Europejskiej), the first extradosed bridge in Poland

== Ozimek ==
- Ozimek Suspension Bridge

== Płock ==
- Legions of Marshal Józef Piłsudski Bridge
- Solidarity Bridge

== Poznań ==
- Bolesława Chrobrego Bridge
- Gabriela Narutowicza Bridge
- Górczyński Bridge
- Królowej Jadwigi Bridge
- Lecha Bridge
- Mieszka I Bridge
- Przemysła I Bridge
- Św. Rocha Bridge

== Puławy ==
- John Paul II Bridge in Puławy

== Świnoujście ==
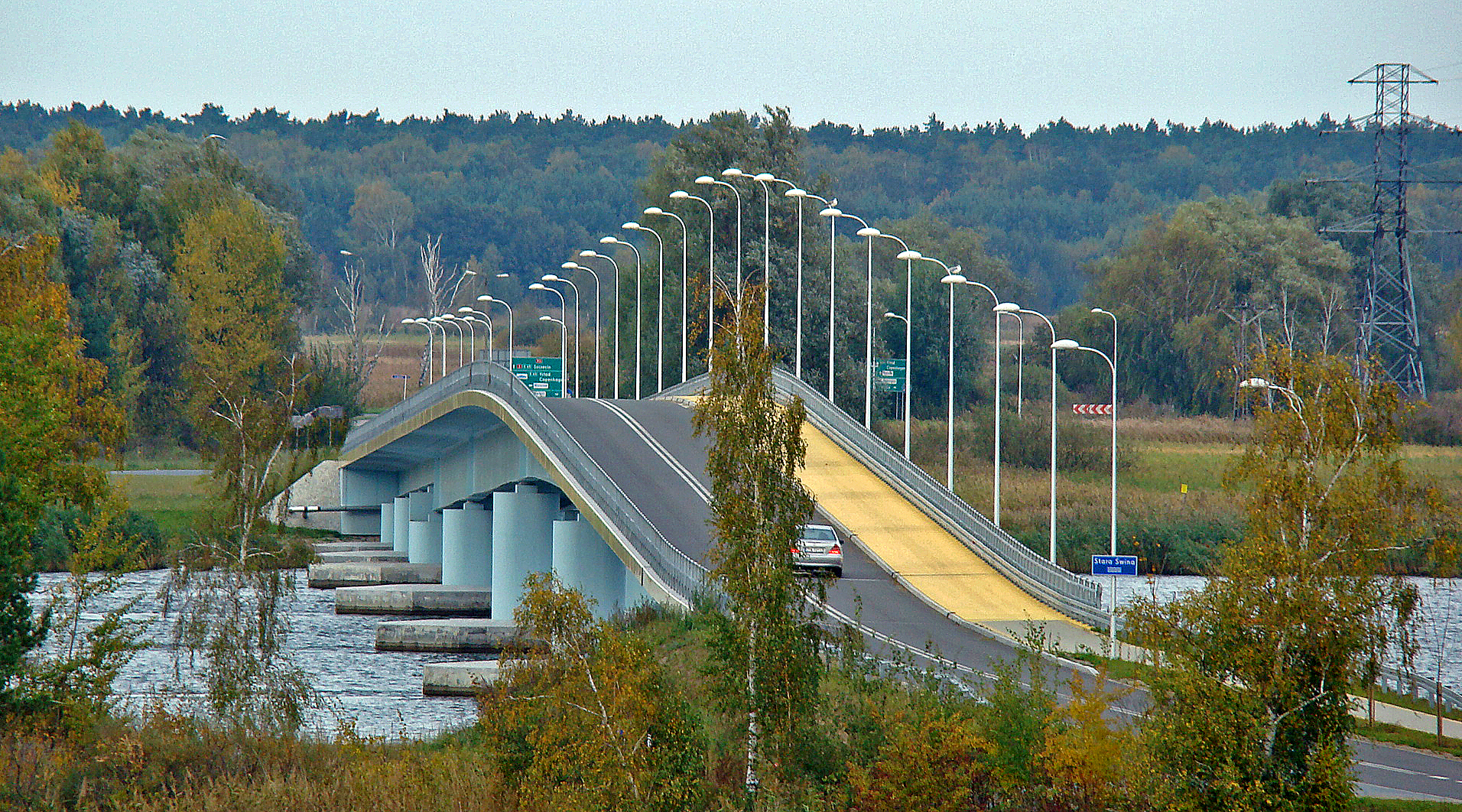
Piastowski bridge

- Piastowski Bridge

== Toruń ==
- East Bridge

== Warsaw ==
- Anna Jagiellon Bridge
- Citadel Rail Bridge
- Gdański Bridge
- Grota-Roweckiego Bridge
- Kierbedzia Bridge
- Krasiński Bridge
- Łazienki Bridge
- Maria Skłodowska-Curie Bridge
- Poniatowski Bridge
- Siekierkowski Bridge
- Sigismund Augustus Bridge
- Śląsko-Dąbrowski Bridge
- Średnicowy Bridge
- Świętokrzyski Bridge

== Wolin ==
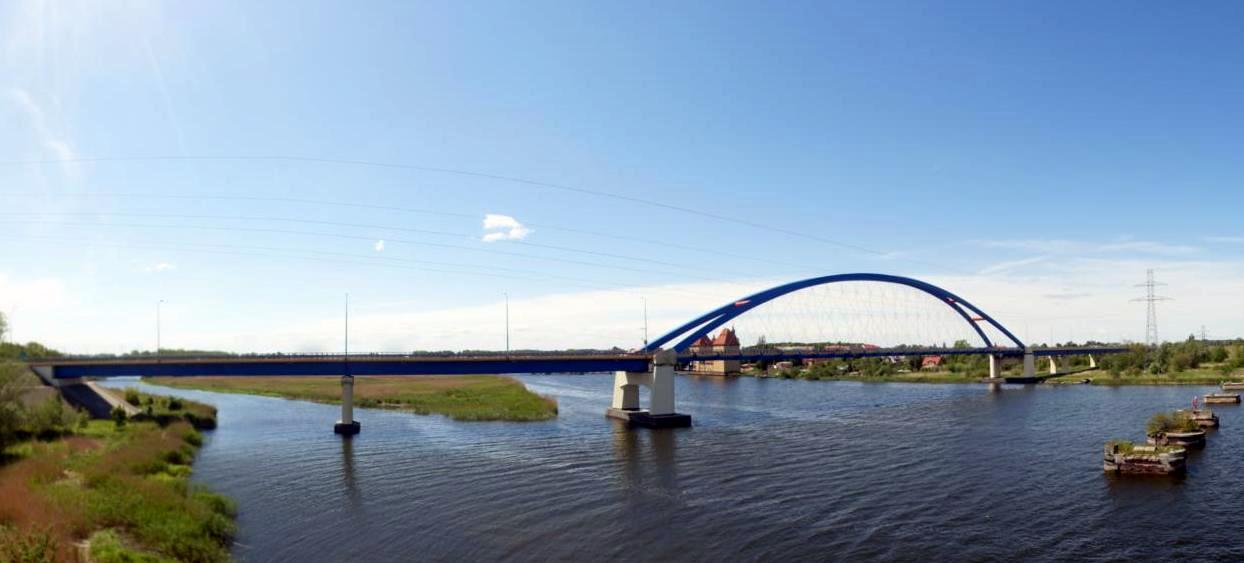
Bypass bridge in Wolin

- Bridge in Wolin
- Swing bridge in Wolin

== Wrocław ==
- Grunwaldzki Bridge
- Millennium Bridge
- Oławski Bridge
- Peace Bridge
- Rędziński Bridge
- Trzebnickie Bridges
- Tumski Bridge
- Warszawskie Bridges
- Zwierzyniecki Bridge

== List of largest bridges in Poland ==
This is a list of notable bridges in Poland. This list sorted by length of the main span.

Image	Rank	Name	Location	Crosses	Design	Material	Year opened	Longest span
		Solidarity Bridge	Płock	Vistula River	Cable-stayed bridge	Steel, 2 Pylons: steel	2007	375 m (1,230 ft)
Linked image		Krasiński Bridge(*)	Warsaw	Vistula River	Arch bridge	Steel-concrete composite, 1 Arch: steel-concrete composite	Planned bridge	277 m (909 ft)
Linked image	*	East Bridge^^	Toruń	Vistula River	Arch bridge	Steel, 2 Arches: steel	2013	270 m (886 ft)
		Rędziński Bridge	Wrocław	Oder River, Rędzińska Island	Cable-stayed bridge	Concrete, 1 Pylon: concrete	2011	256 m (840 ft)
		Siekierkowski Bridge	Warsaw	Vistula River	Cable-stayed bridge	Steel-concrete composite, 2 Pylons: concrete	2002	250 m (820 ft)
		Third Millennium John Paul II Bridge	Gdańsk	Dead Vistula River	Cable-stayed bridge	Steel-concrete composite, 1 Pylon: concrete	2001	230 m (755 ft)
		John Paul II Bridge	Puławy	Vistula River	Arch bridge	Steel-concrete composite, 1 Arch: steel	2008	212 m (696 ft)
Linked image	*	Bridge near Kwidzyn^^	Korzeniewo – Opalenie (Pomeranian Voivodeship)	Vistula River	Cable-stayed bridge	Concrete, 3 Pylons: concrete	2012	204 m (669 ft)
Linked image	*	Bridge across the Nowohucka Route(*)	Cracow	Vistula River	Cable-stayed bridge	Concrete, 4 Pylons: concrete	Planned bridge	200 m (656 ft)
		Świętokrzyski Bridge	Warsaw	Vistula River	Cable-stayed bridge	Steel-concrete composite, 1 Pylon: concrete	2000	180 m (591 ft)
Linked image		Bridge near Grudziądz^^	Grudziądz	Vistula River	Beam bridge	Concrete	2011	180 m (591 ft)
		Kotlarski Bridge	Cracow	Vistula River	Arch bridge	Steel, 1 Arch: steel	2001	166 m (545 ft)
		Bridge in Wolin	Wolin	Strait of Dziwna	Arch bridge	Steel-concrete composite, 1 Arch: steel	2003	165 m (541 ft)
		Maria Skłodowska-Curie Bridge^^	Warsaw	Vistula River	Beam bridge	Steel-concrete composite	2012	160 m (525 ft)
		Millennium Bridge	Wrocław	Oder River, Bay of the river harbour: Zimowisko Osobowice	Cable-stayed bridge	Concrete, 2 Pylons: concrete	2004	153 m (502 ft)
Linked Image		Bridge of the European Union	Kronin	Warta River	Extradosed bridge, first of this type in Poland	Concrete, 2 Pylons: concrete	2007	80 metres (260 ft)

(*) – Planned bridge
^^ – Under construction bridge

== See also ==
- List of bridges
