= Grunwald Bridge =

Grunwald Bridge Most Grunwaldzki
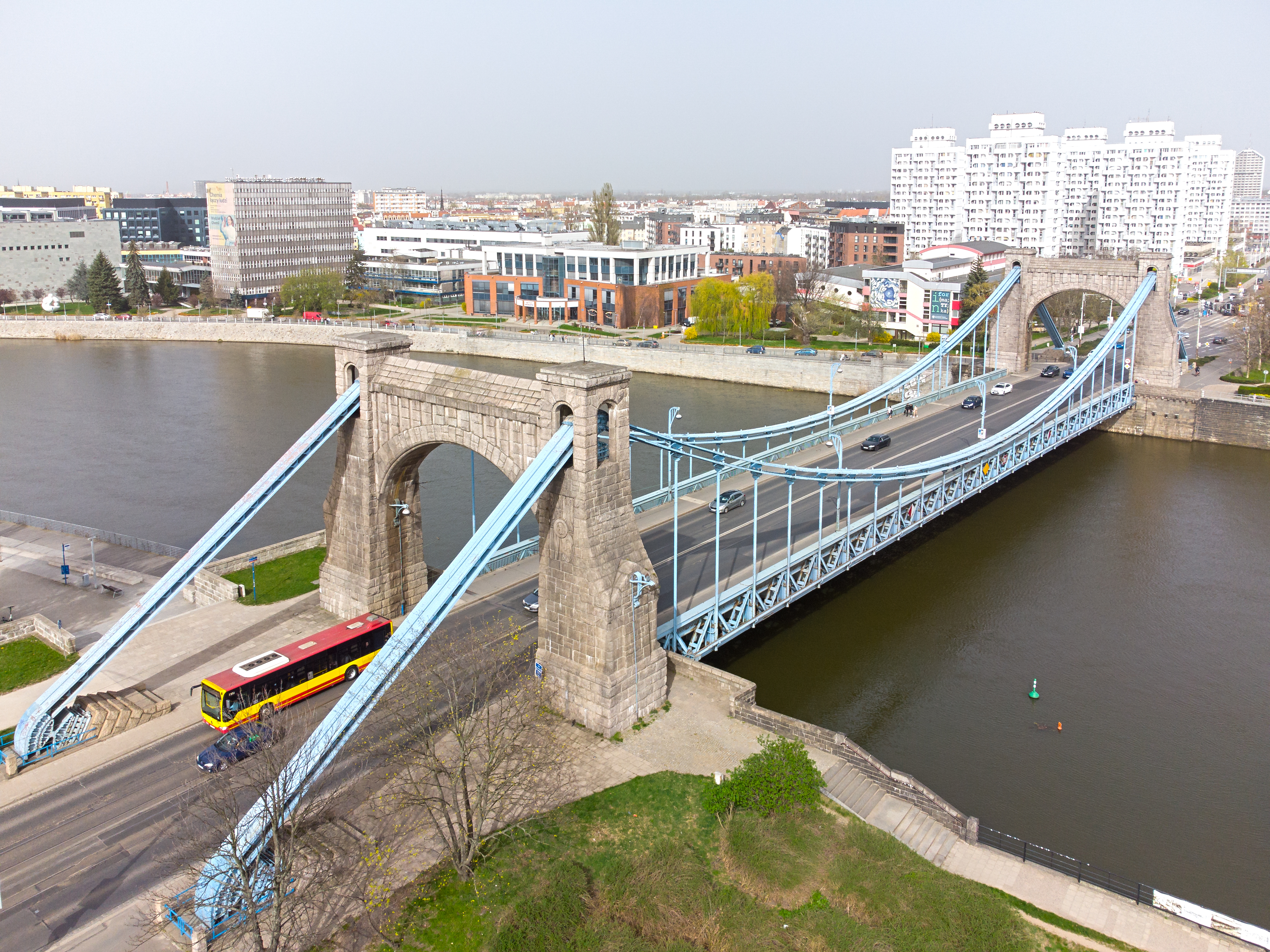
- The bridge seen from the Oder River
- Coordinates: 51°06′34″N 17°03′10″E
- Crosses: Oder
- Locale: Śródmieście, Wrocław, Stare Miasto, Wrocław
- Preceded by: Zwierzyniecka Bridge
- Followed by: Peace Bridge

Characteristics
- Design: Suspension bridge
- Total length: 112.5 m (369.1 ft)
- Width: 18 m (59.1 ft)
- Design life: Reconstructed in 1945–1947, 2005

History
- Opened: 10 October 1910; 115 years ago

Location
- Interactive map of Grunwald Bridge

Grunwald Bridge (Polish: Most Grunwaldzki) is a suspension bridge over the river Oder in Wrocław, Poland, built between 1908 and 1910. Initially the bridge was called the Imperial Bridge (Kaiserbrücke), then the Bridge of Freedom (Freiheitsbrücke). The architectural design of the bridge was by a city councilor, Richard Plüddemann. The bridge opened on 10 October 1910 in the presence of Emperor Wilhelm II.

It is one of the longest bridges of its kind in Poland, being 112.5 meters long, 18 meters wide, and weighing 2.3 thousand tons. It was constructed of Silesian granite.

The bridge was repaired and reopened in September 1947 after being damaged during World War II. Currently, a streetcar line runs across the bridge.

== See also ==
- Bridges of Poland
- Siege of Breslau
