= Wrocław Water Tower =

- Wieża ciśnień we Wrocławiu
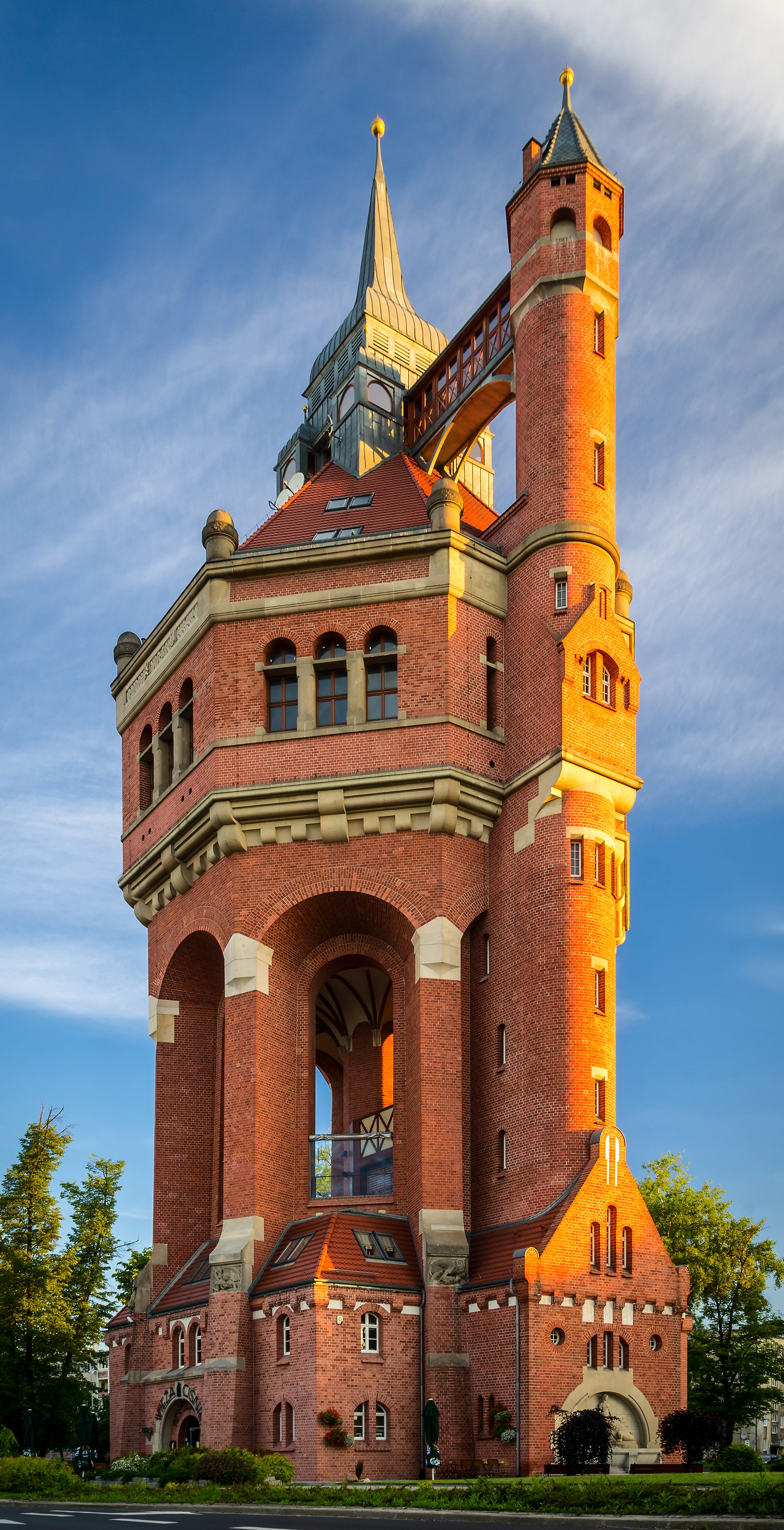

General information
- Type: Water tower
- Town or city: Wrocław
- Country: Poland
- Coordinates: 51°5′6.8″N 17°1′3.2″E
- Completed: 1905
- Height: 63 m

The Wrocław Water Tower (Polish: Wieża ciśnień we Wrocławiu; German: Wasserturm Breslau) is a historic water tower situated in the Borek neighbourhood of Wrocław, Poland.

== Construction ==
The water tower at Sudecka Street (formerly Hohenzollernstraße) in Wrocław was designed by Karl Klimm, a reputed local architect, during the German era when the city was known as Breslau. Famed at the beginning of the 20th century, Klimm also designed the building of the High School of Construction Engineering and Machinery (the today’s Faculty of Architecture of the Wrocław University of Technology) and the Zwierzyniecki Bridge (formerly known as the Pass Bridge).

Built 1904–1905 beside Wiśniowa Avenue and Sudecka Street junction, the tower supplied water to the residents of the southern districts of Wrocław for many years. The tower is 63 meters high. It was equipped with an electric lift from the very beginning. From June 1906 the lift allowed people to reach an observation deck situated at a height of 42 meters (the ticket cost 10 pfennig), from which one could admire the vista of Wrocław, its surroundings and Mount Ślęża. Two years later a red flag used to be hung at the top to inform people about very good viewing of the Sudety Mountains on a given day.

Two sculptors, Taschner and Bednorz, decorated the lower part of the building with bas-reliefs in sandstone, representing fantastic creatures reminiscent of medieval bestiaries. From a fountain situated on the north-eastern façade flowed crystal clear water that had its source in the tower’s vault. The fountain once depicted a nymph mounting Triton.

This giant brick construction was modelled on medieval castles. The tower was placed on solid foundations, which housed flats for company employees operating the water supply system.

== History ==
During the Battle of Festung Breslau in 1945 the tower served as a command point. The surrounding area was heavily bombed and damaged in combat, yet the tower remained almost intact during World War II. However, the war and the following years saw the tower suffer greatly from neglect. Until the mid eighties the tower served as a reservoir, equalizing water pressure for the southern districts.

In 1995 the tower was purchased from the city by the Stephan Elektronik Investment Company and turned into a restaurant complex, called Wieża Cisnień ('Water Tower'). In 2017 the property was sold to a new private investor and the tower is no longer open to visitors.

== Gallery ==
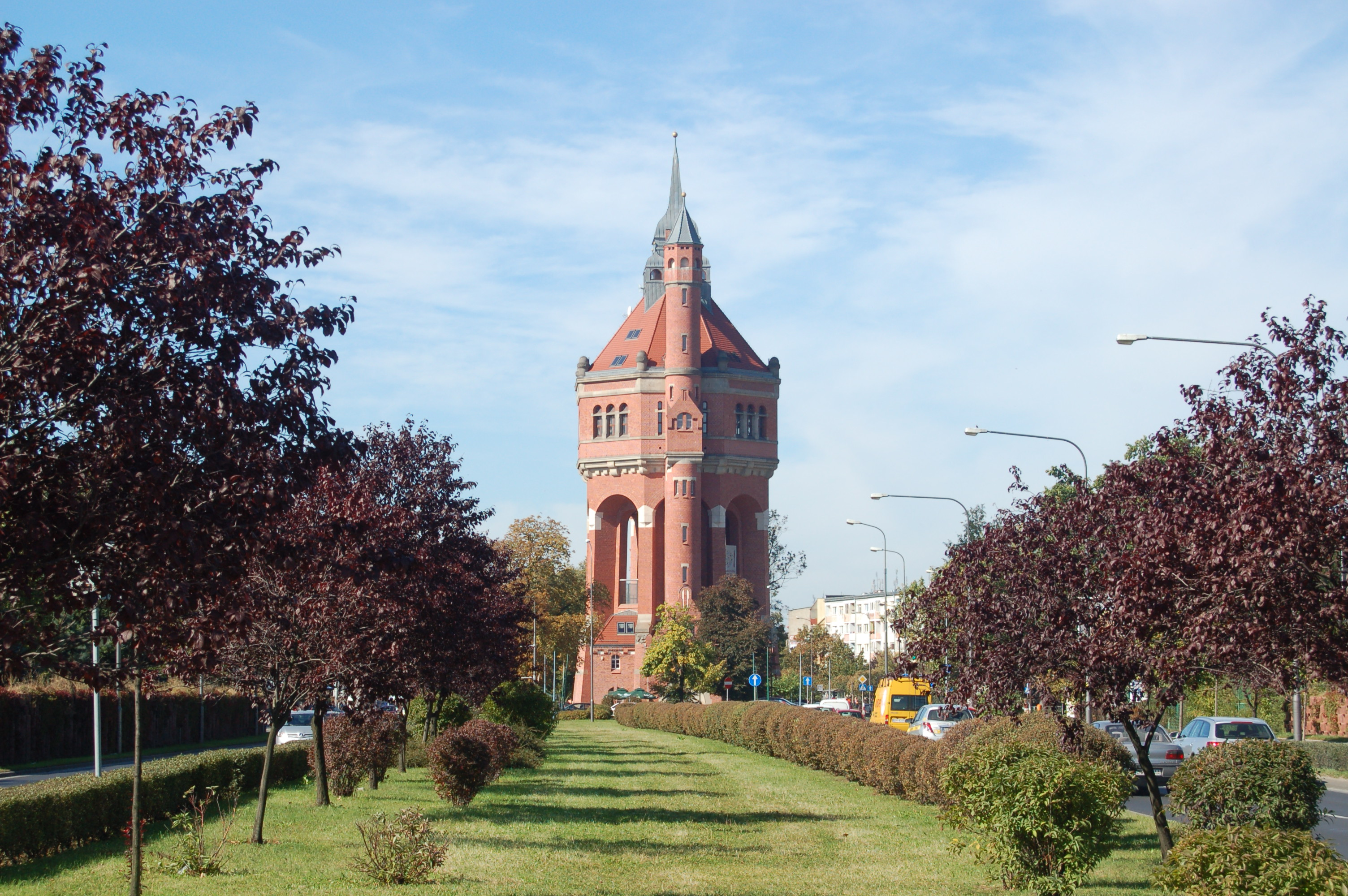

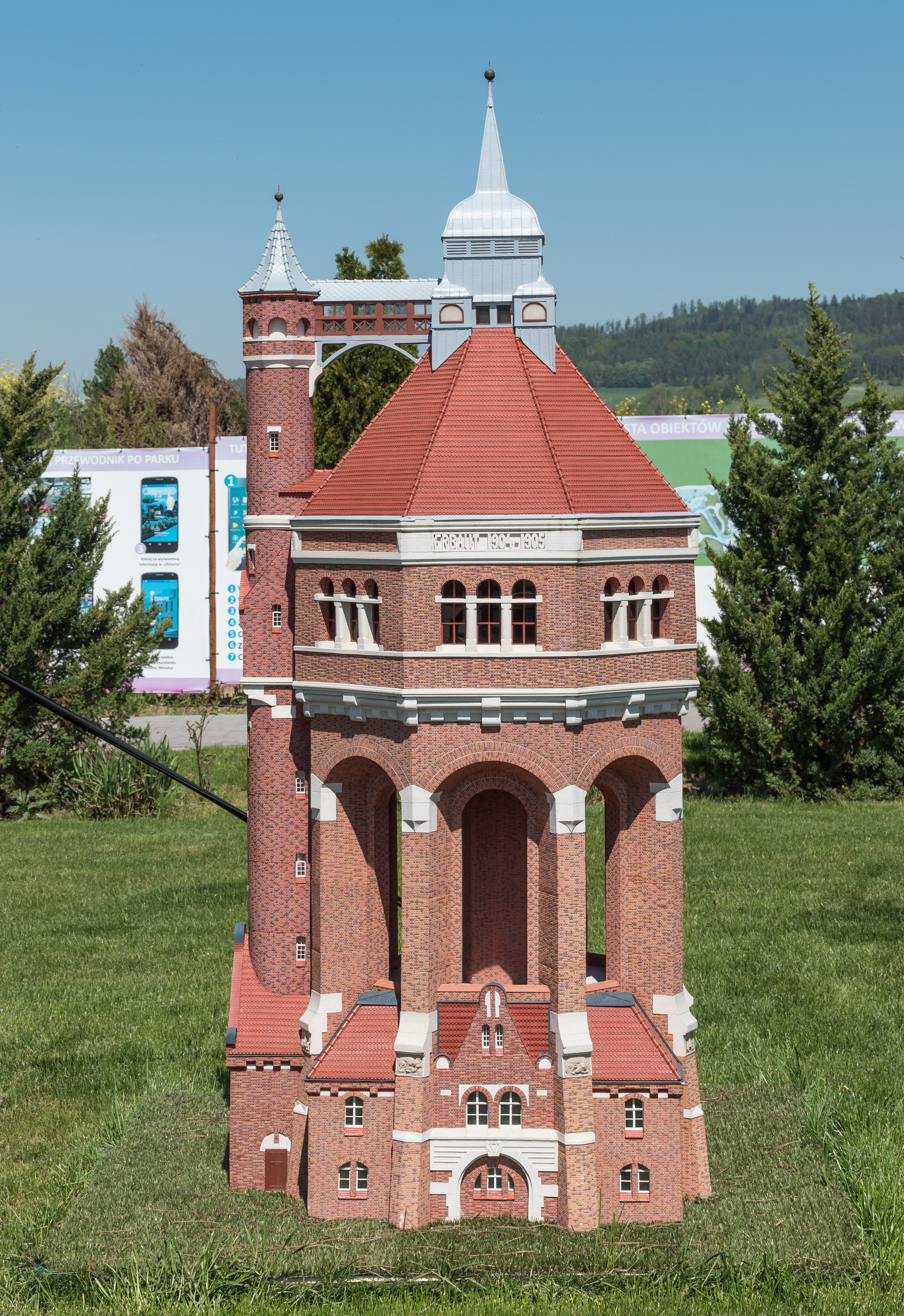
Minieuroland in Kłodzko, water tower in Wrocław

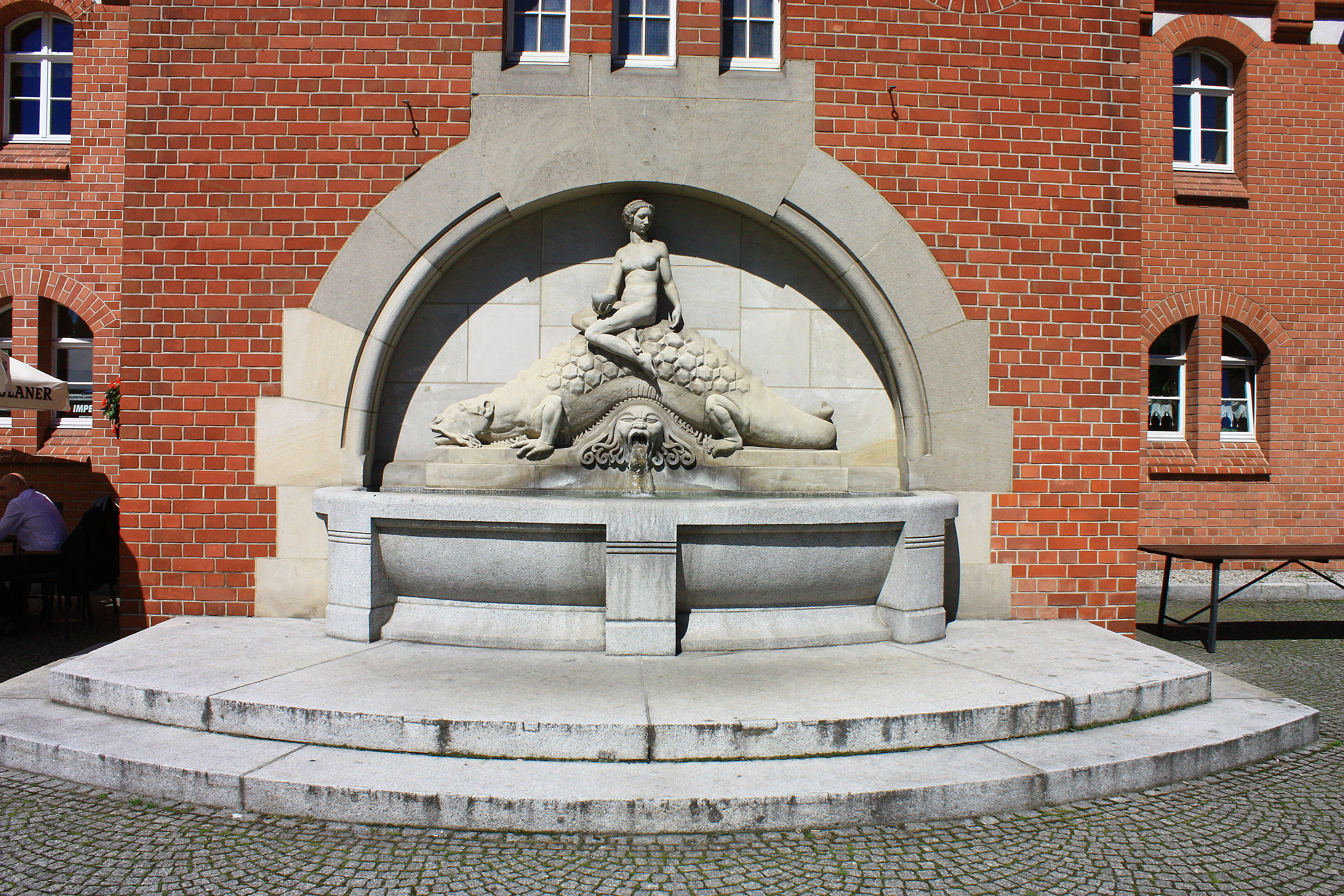
Wall fountain on the facade
