= Borek, Wrocław =

District in Wrocław, Poland

Borek
- District of Wrocław
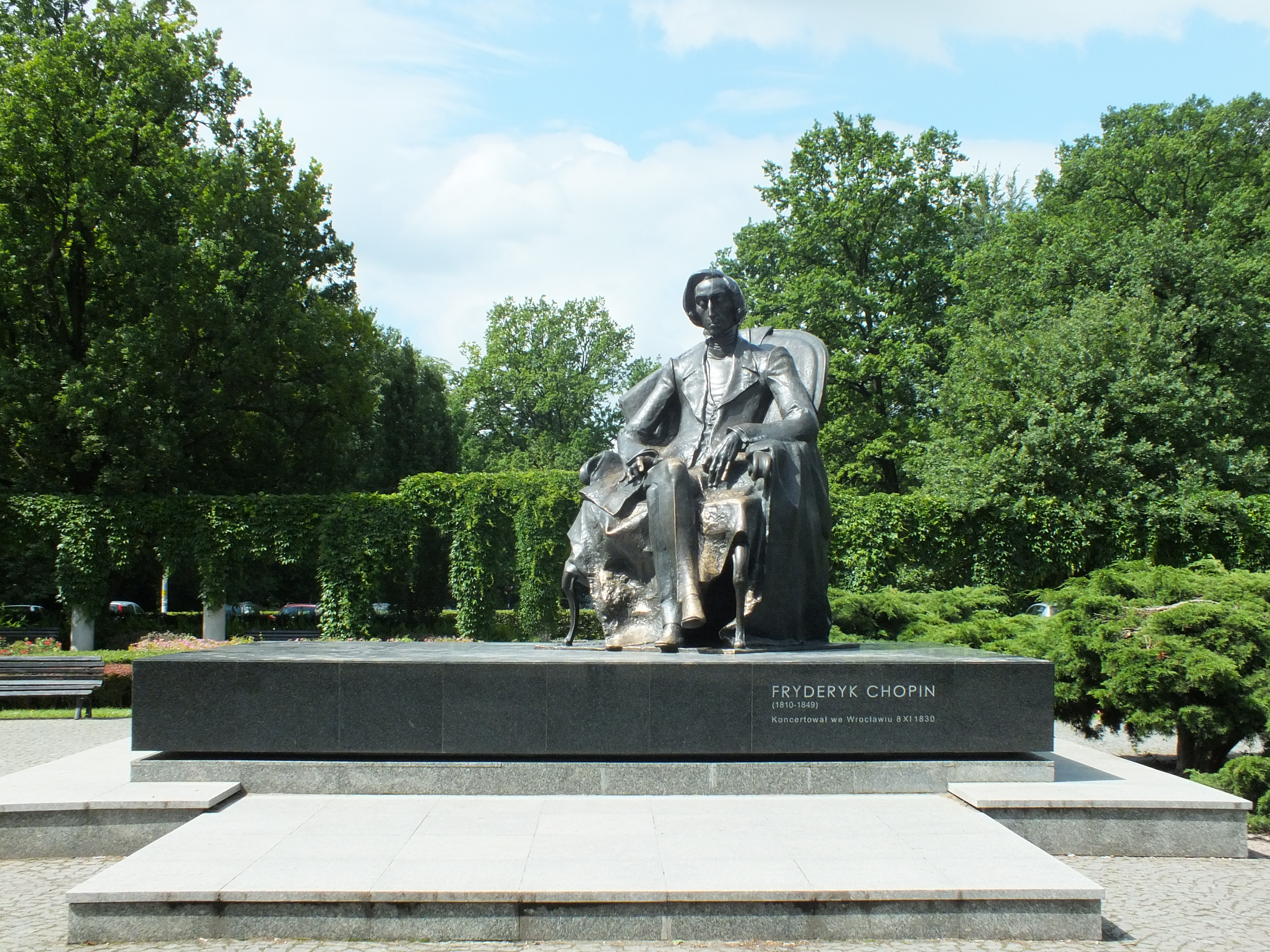
- Fryderyk Chopin monument

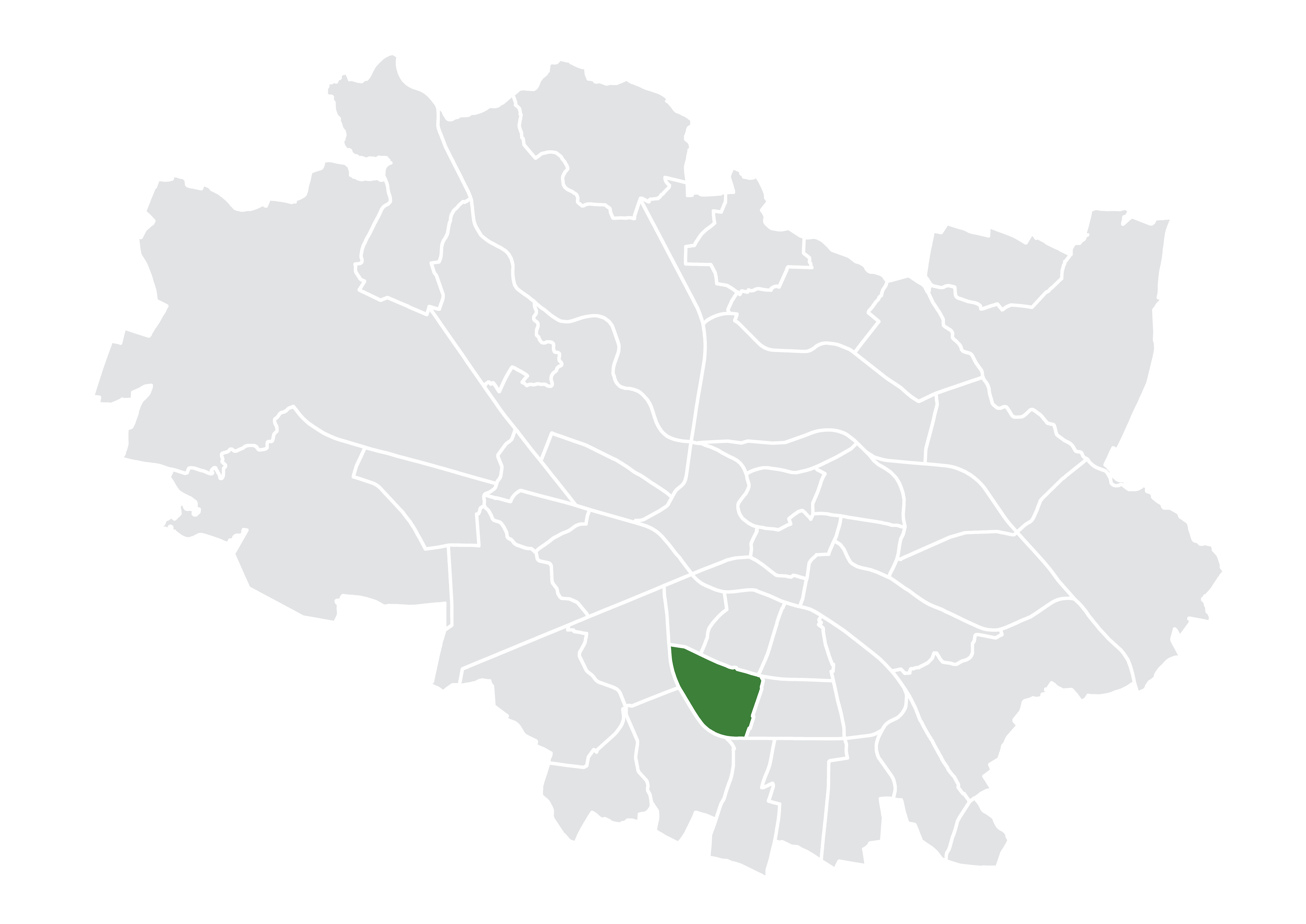
- Location of Borek within Wrocław
- Country: Poland
- Voivodeship: Lower Silesian
- County/City: Wrocław
- First mentioned: 1193
- Incorporated into the city: 1897
- Established the modern-day district: 1991

Population (2022)
  - Total: 11,883
- Time zone: UTC+1 (CET)
  - Summer (DST): UTC+2 (CEST)
- Area code: +48 71
- Website: Osiedle Borek

Borek (Polish pronunciation: [ˈbɔrɛk], German: Kleinburg, [ˈklaɪ̯nbʊɐ̯k]) is a district in Wrocław, Poland, located in the southern part of the city. It was established in the territory of the former Krzyki borough.

== Name ==
The origin of the district's name derives from the Polish word bór ('conifer forest'), which was located on the village itself. Later the name of the settlement was Germanised by the Germans living in Breslau, as a result of which the name shifted to phonetically similar German Burg ('castle'). Subsequently, the name of the village became Kleinburg ('little castle').

After the war, the district was renamed Januszewice. Two years later, in 1947, its name was changed again to Borek.

== History ==
The earliest record of Borek comes from 1193. The settlement was incorporated the city limits in 1897. The district was not severely damaged during World War II, therefore a significant part of its buildings are pre-war villas and townhouses.

In 1991, after reforms in the administrative division of Wrocław, Borek became one of the city's 48 districts.

The most notable objects in Borek are the Wrocław Water Tower, Borek tram depot and the Southern Park.

== Notable people ==
- Manfred von Richthofen, German World War I flying ace known as the Red Baron - born in Kleinburg 2 May 1892
