= Rędzin Bridge =

Rędzin Bridge Most Rędziński
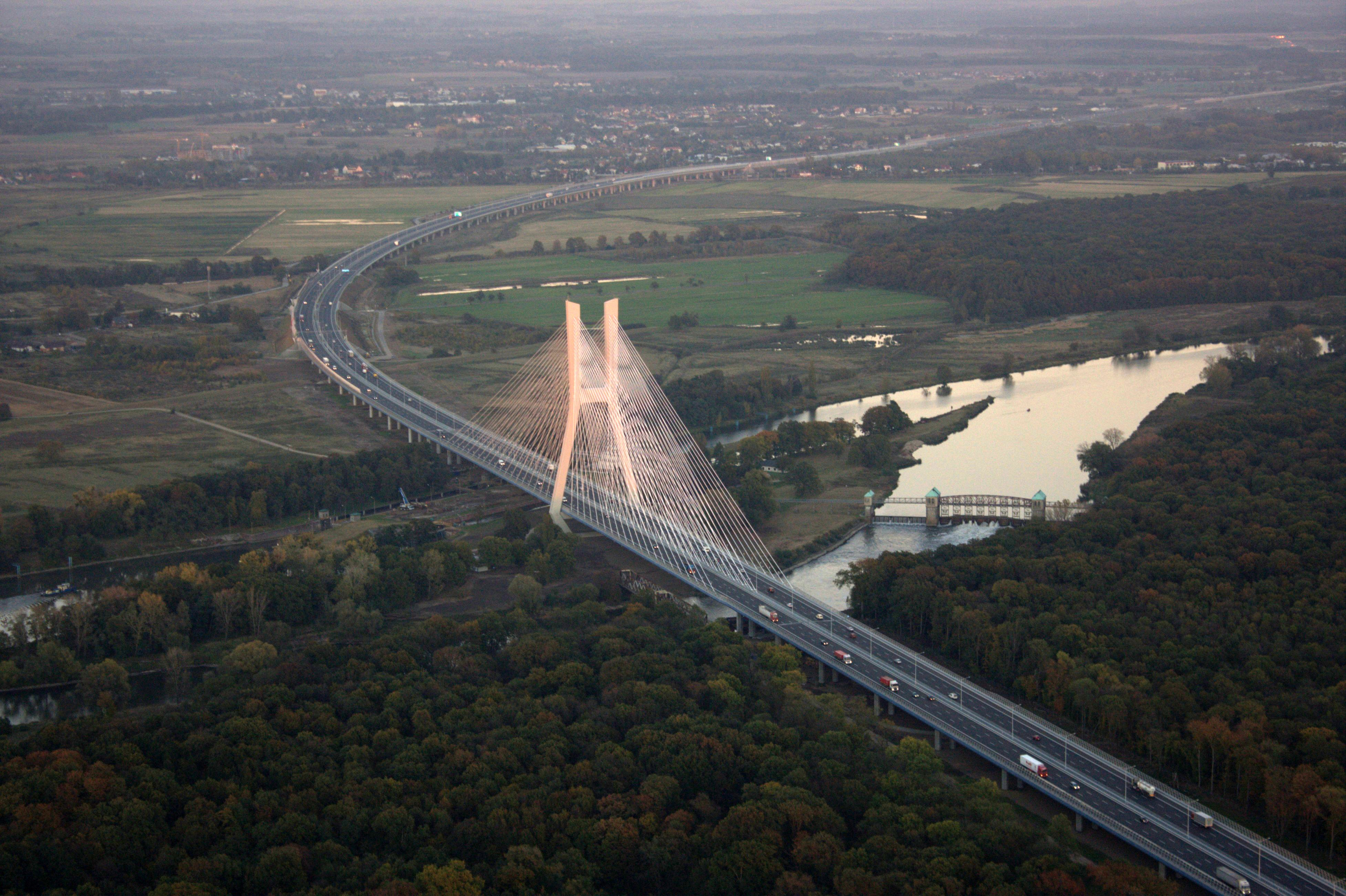
- Coordinates: 51°9′24″N 16°57′35″E
- Carries: 6 lanes of
- Crosses: Oder
- Locale: Wrocław, Lower Silesia, Poland
- Maintained by: GDDKiA

Characteristics
- Design: Cable-stayed
- Material: Reinforced concrete and steel
- Total length: 1.7 km (1.1 mi) or 1,742 m (5,715.2 ft)
- Width: 38.58 m (126.6 ft)
- Height: 122 m (400.3 ft)
- Longest span: 256 m (839.9 ft)
- No. of spans: 4 (50+256+256+50 m)
- Clearance below: 18 m (59.1 ft)

History
- Designer: Jan Biliszczuk
- Construction start: 2008
- Construction end: 2011
- Opened: 31 August 2011; 14 years ago

Location
- Interactive map of Rędzin Bridge

The Rędzin Bridge (Polish: Most Rędziński) is a cable-stayed bridge spanning the Oder river in Wrocław, Poland. As a section of the A8 motorway bypassing the center of Wroclaw, the bridge links both sections of the route across the Oder, providing connections to the A4 motorway to the south, and to the S5 and S8 expressways to the northeast. With its pylon reaching a height of 122 m (400 ft) and having a total length of 1.7 km (1.1 mi), the Rędzin Bridge is the tallest and longest bridge in Poland.

== History ==
Designed by Jan Biliszczuk, a professor of engineering at the Wrocław University of Technology, the bridge's design exceeded the length of the Solidarity Bridge in Płock by 30 m, then the longest bridge in the country. The contracts for the bridge's construction were awarded to the Warsaw-based Mostostal consortium and its parent Spanish firm, Acciona Infraestructuras on 20 May 2008, with construction commencing shortly afterwards. Construction of the bridge (and its main A8 motorway) continued for the next three years. Building efforts were temporarily halted during the 2010 Central European floods, but later resumed after a short delay.

The structure was unofficially named the Rędzin Bridge by its builders due to the bridge's spanning of Rędzin Island in the Oder. In August 2011, the Wrocław bureau of GDDKiA, the branch of the Ministry of Infrastructure tasked to roads, organized a naming competition of the bridge. After over 15,000 ballots cast, the Rędzin Bridge won 55 percent of all total votes. The name defeated other popular choices such as "Śląski" by a wide margin.

Construction was completed by the end of August 2011. Financial costs for the bridge are estimated at 576 million PLN. Shortly before the bridge's opening to public traffic, coinciding with the opening of the last sections of the A8 motorway, Prime Minister Donald Tusk visited the sight and praised its engineering. "This, I think, is a very good place and a very good moment to say that Poland is really under construction in a breathtaking way, at least in some places," Tusk was quoted.

The bridge opened to A8 traffic on 31 August 2011, just over a year before start of the UEFA Euro 2012.

Main span has 512 m long and consists of two cable-stayed spans 256 m long each. The bridge is the longest cable-stayed bridge with one pylon in Poland.

== Images ==
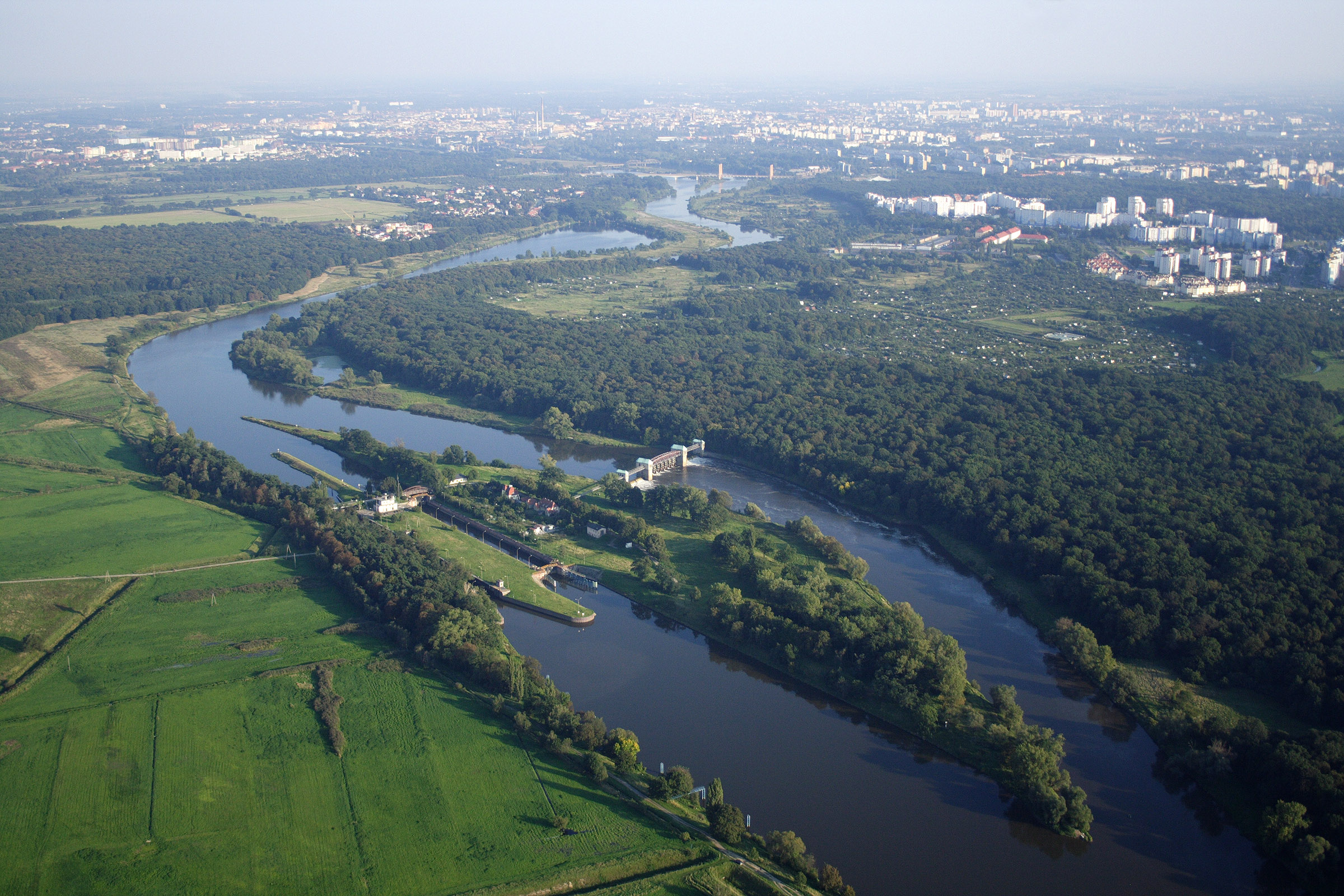
Rędzin Island, September 2006

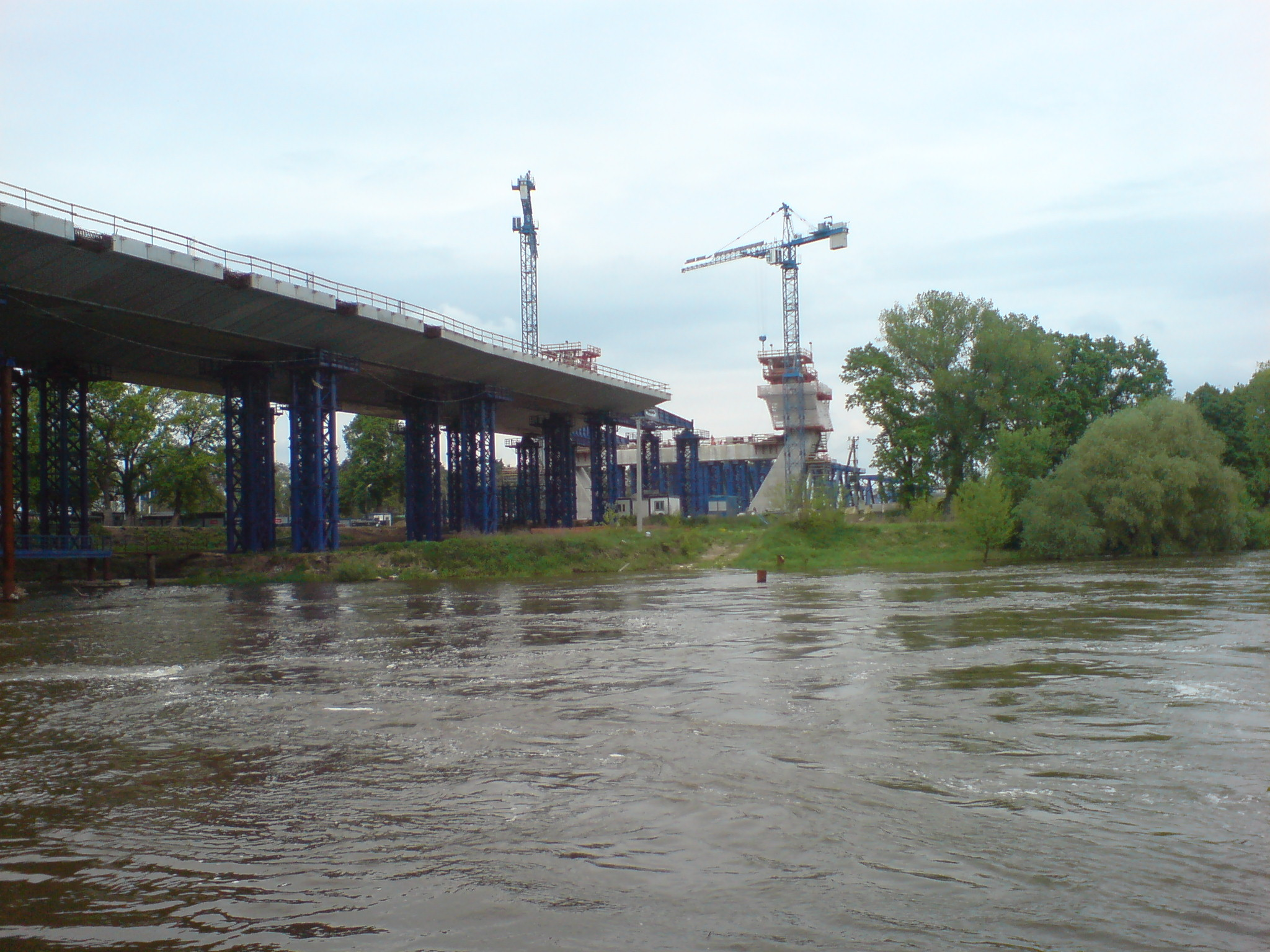
May 2010

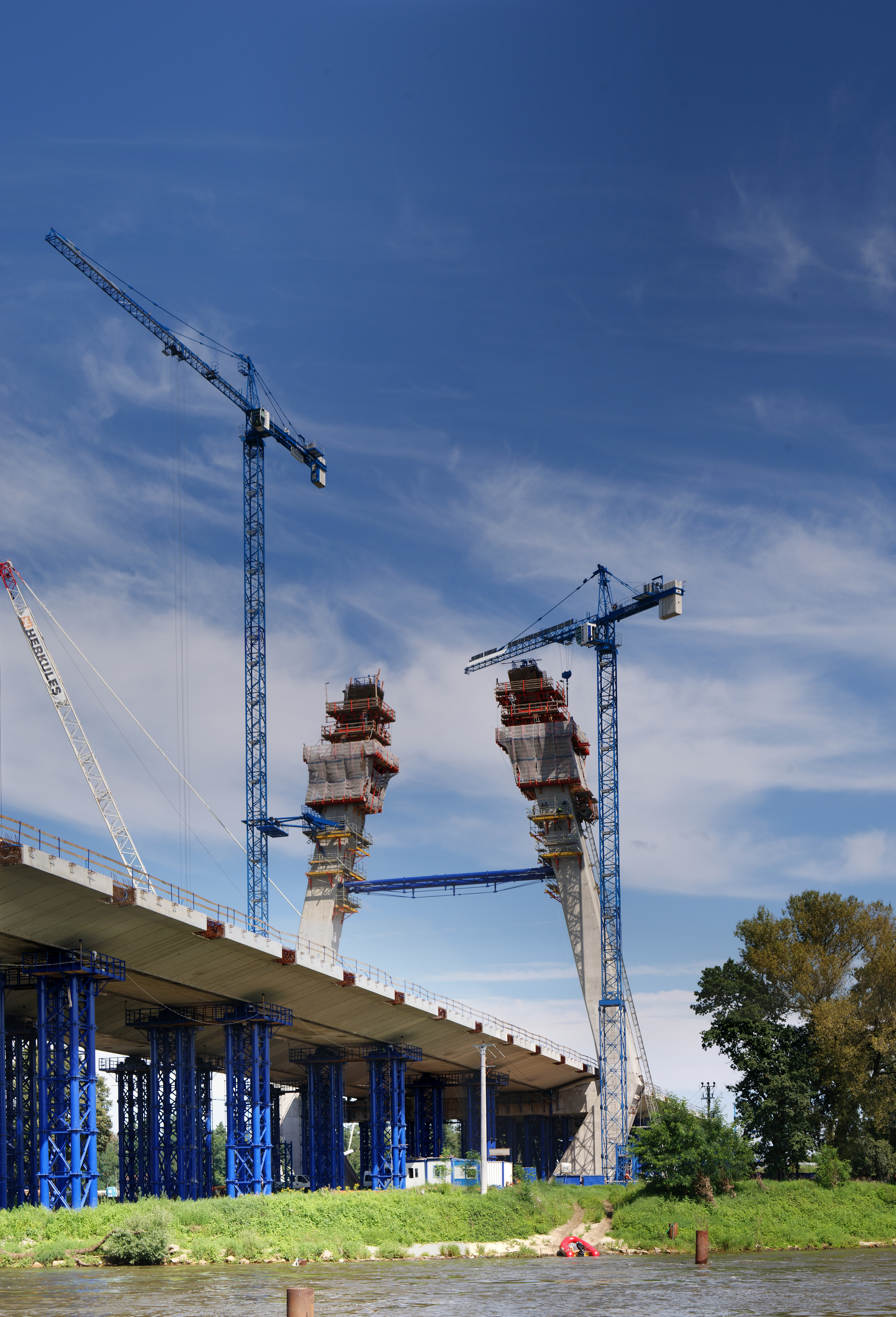
August 2010

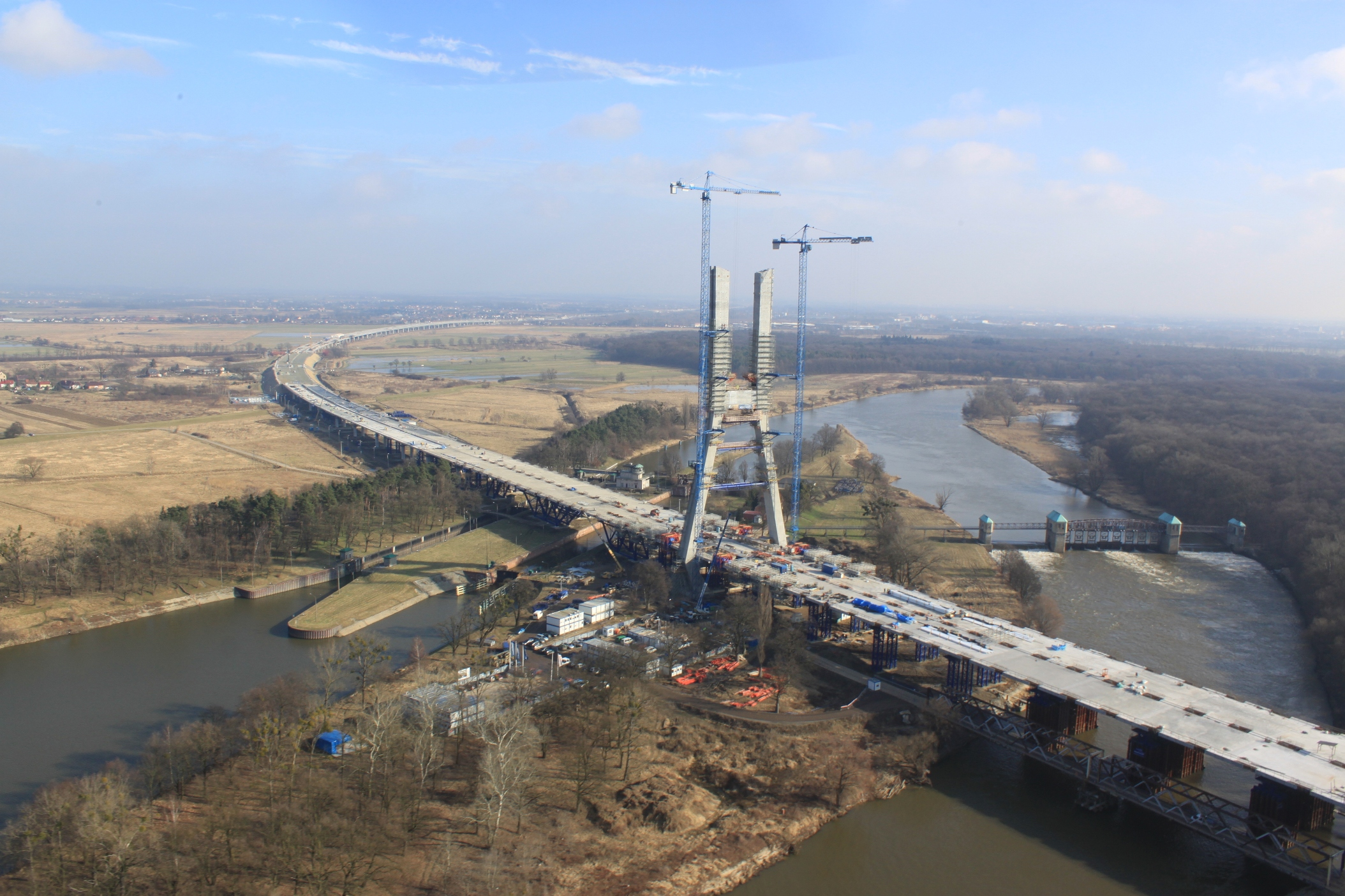
March 2011

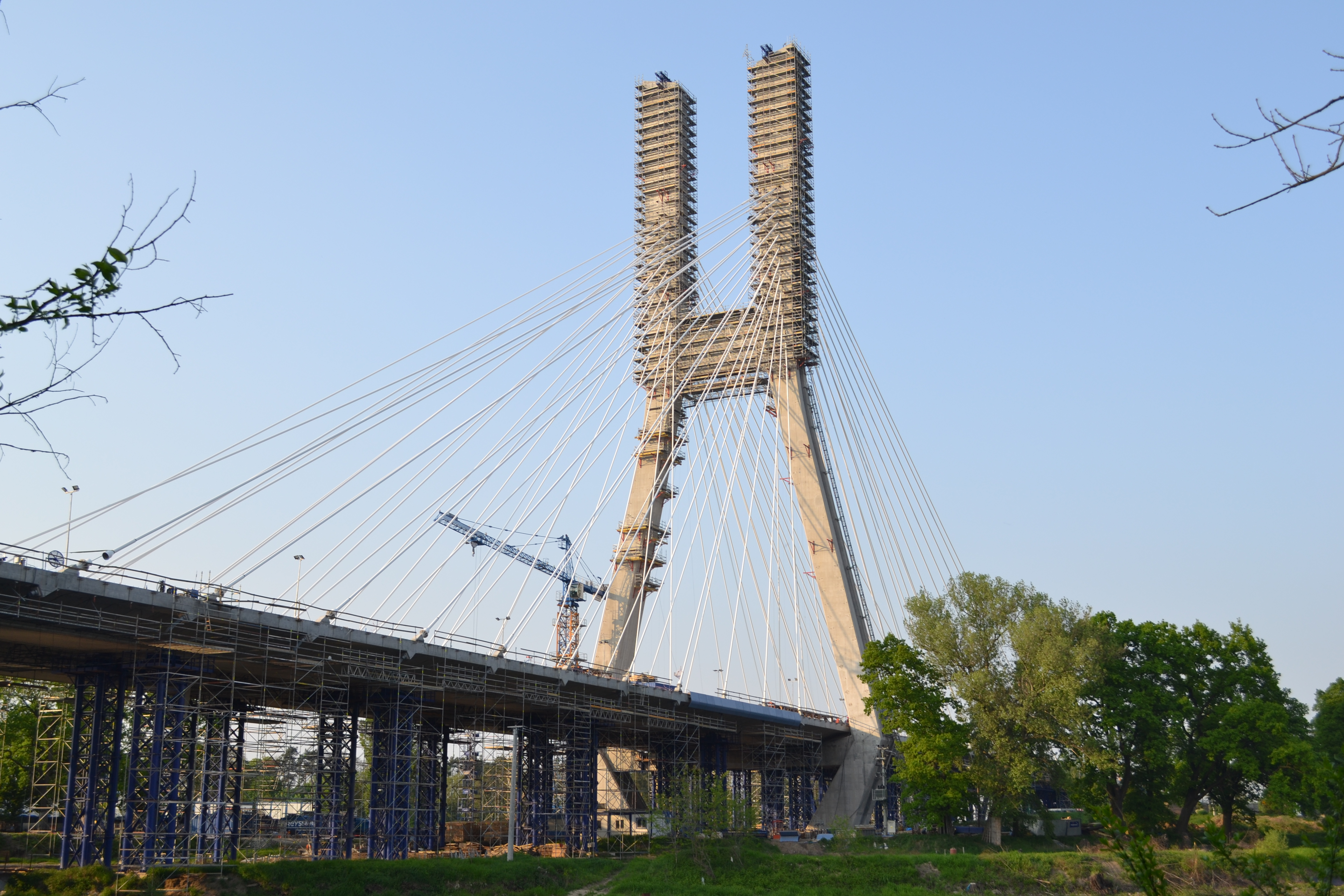
May 2011

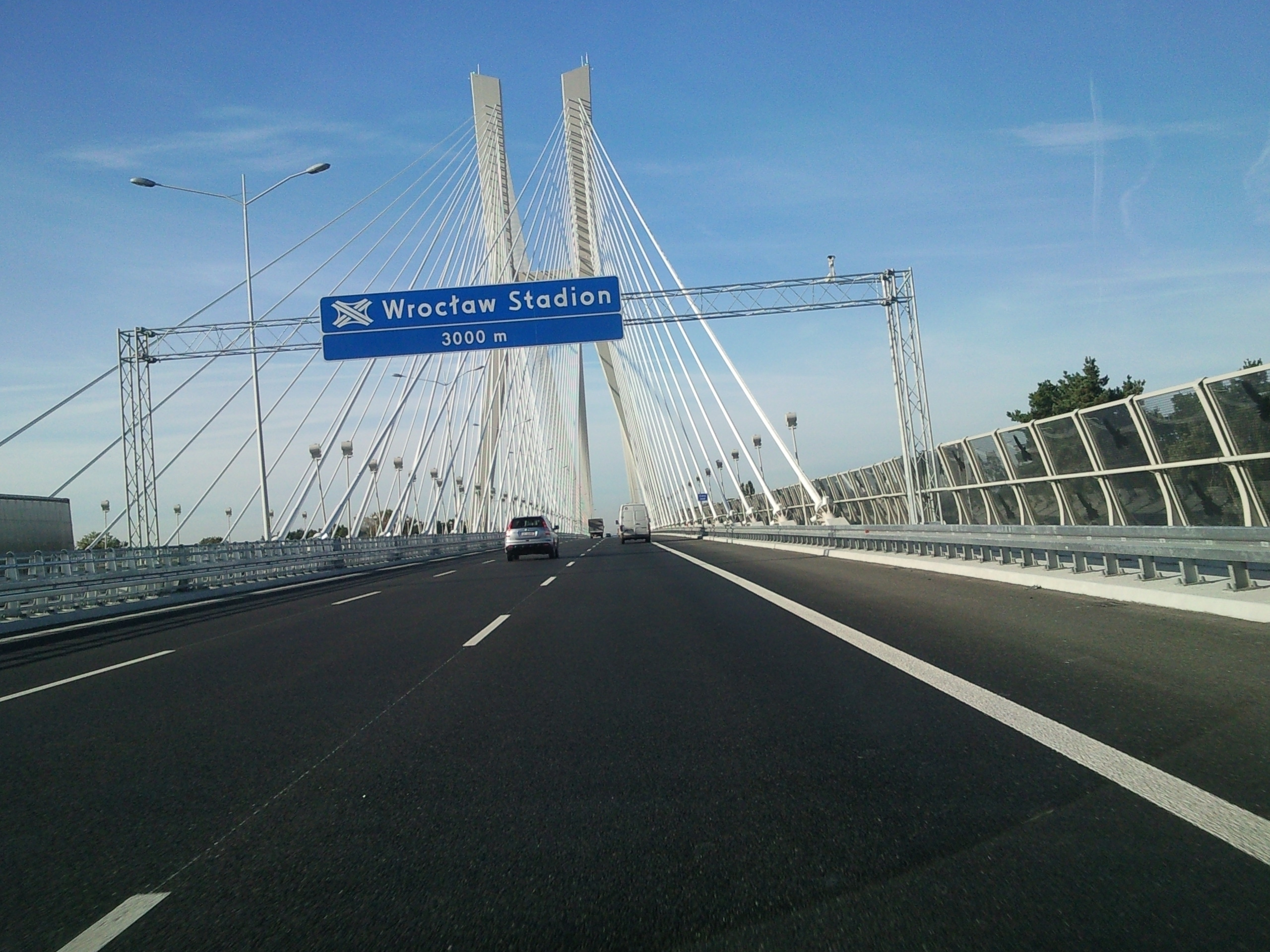
Completion, August 2011

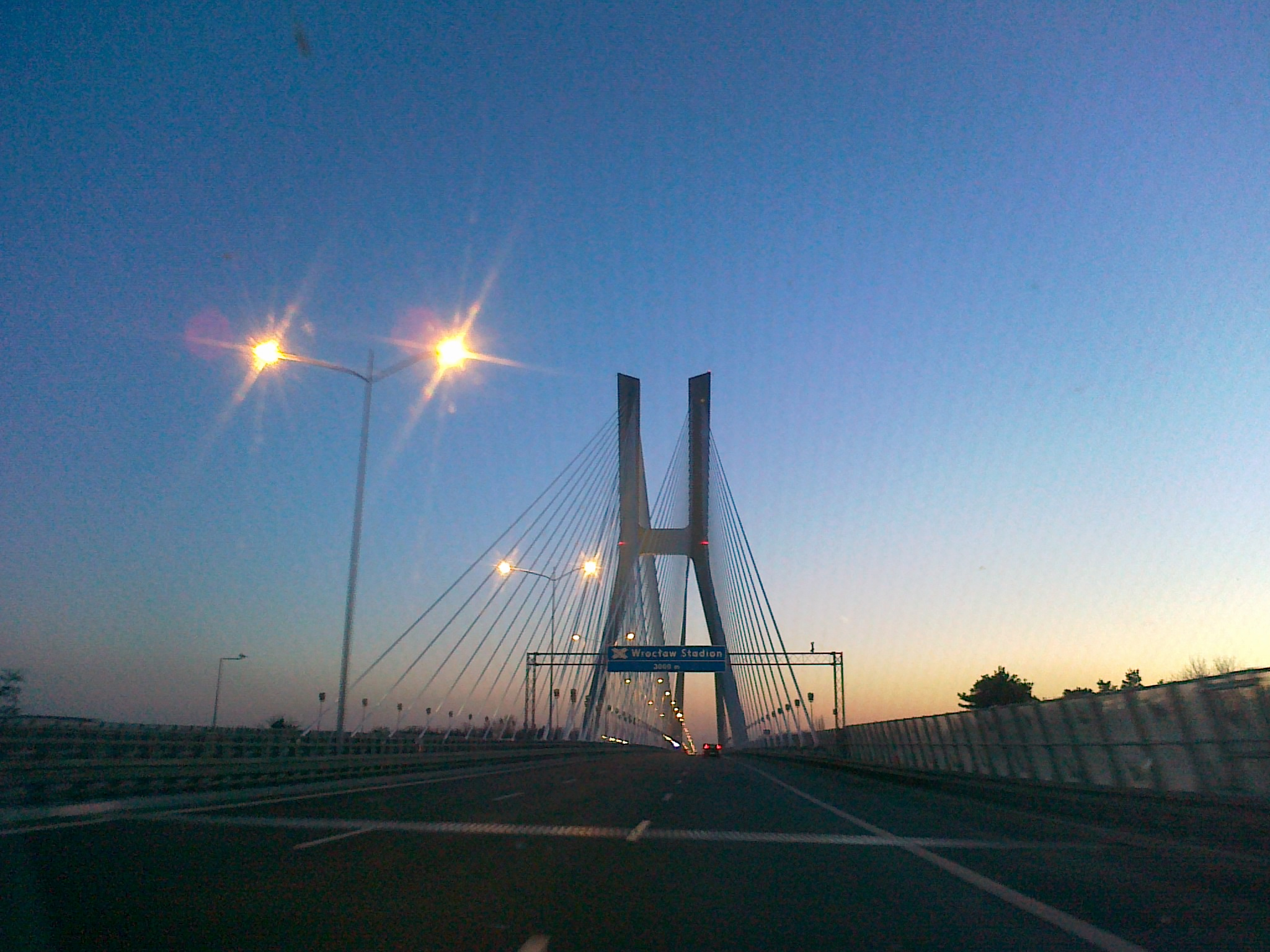
Rędzin Bridge at dusk

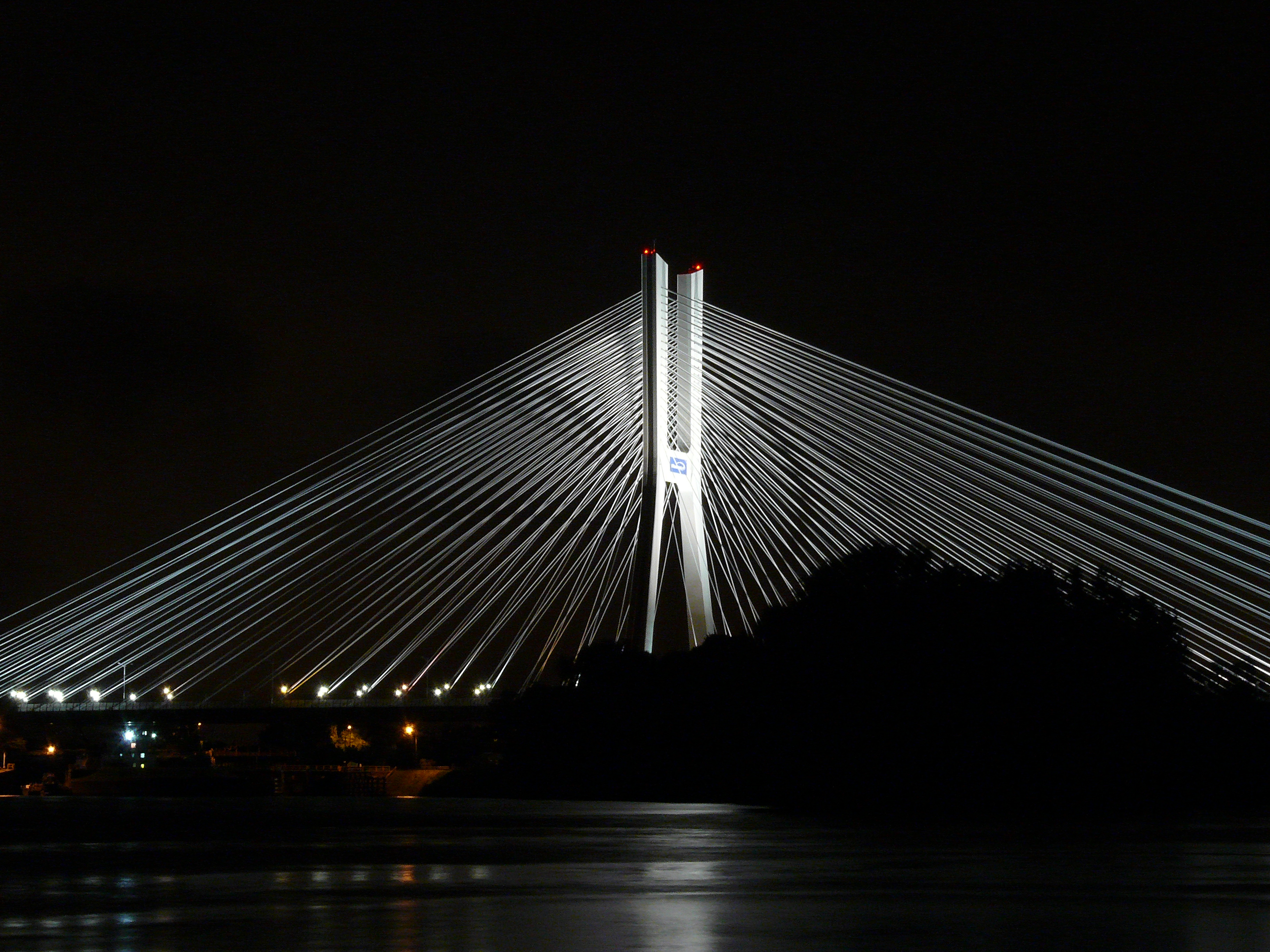
The Rędziński Bridge illuminated at night

== See also ==
- Third Millennium John Paul II Bridge
- Solidarity Bridge
- Most Świętokrzyski
- Siekierkowski Bridge
