= Citadel railway bridge =

Bridge in Warsaw, Poland

Citadel Rail Bridge Most przy Cytadeli
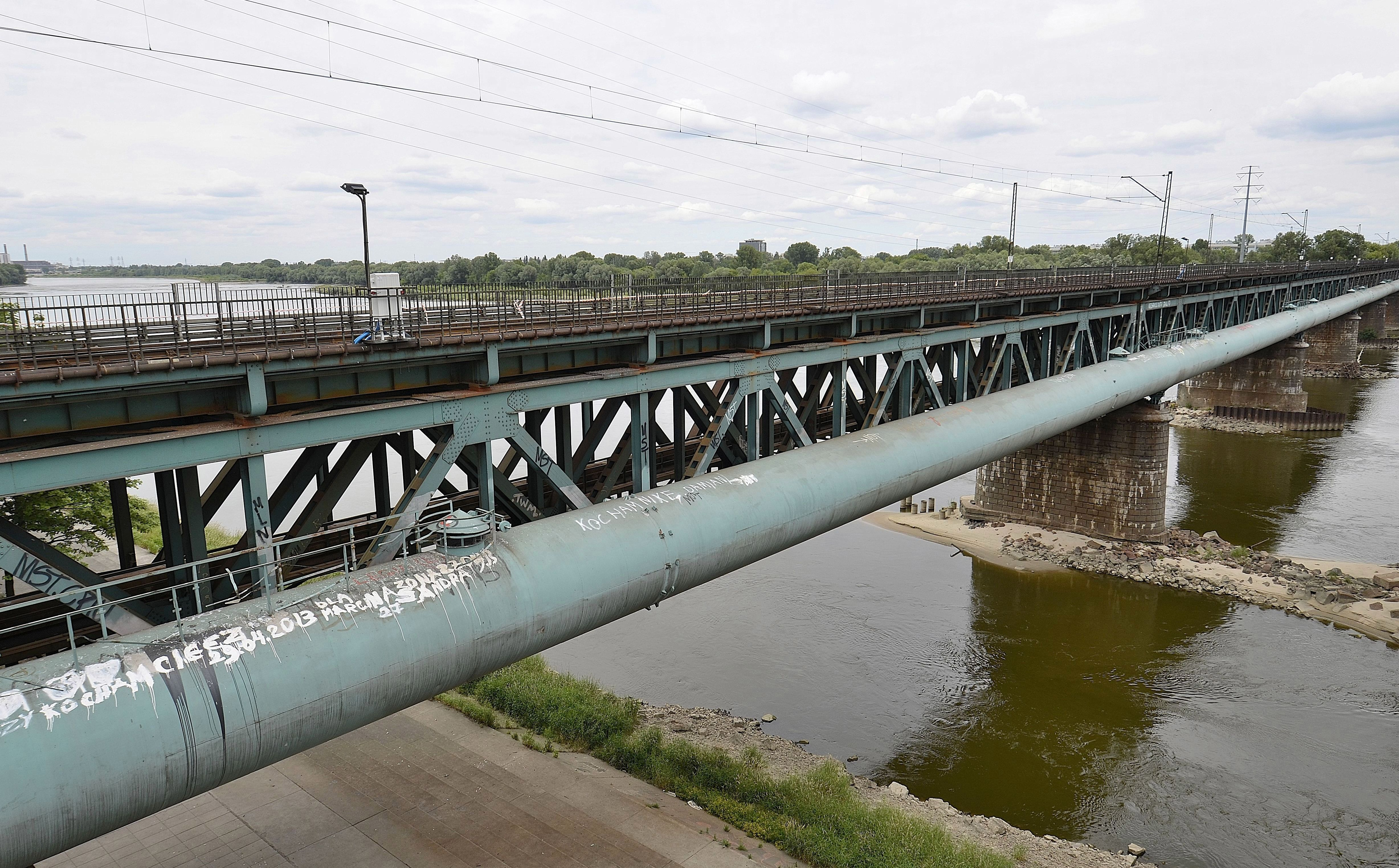
- Citadel Rail Bridge
- Coordinates: 52°15′38″N 21°00′33″E
- Carried: Rail transport, Road transport
- Crossed: Vistula River
- Official name: Railway Bridge
- Other name(s): Second Bridge, Fourth Bridge
- Preceded by: Gdańsk Bridge
- Followed by: General Stefan Grot-Rowecki Bridge

History
- Construction start: 1873
- Opened: November 1875
- Collapsed: 13 September 1944

Location
- Interactive map of Citadel Rail Bridge

The Citadel Rail Bridge (Polish: Most przy Cytadeli) was a bridge in Warsaw, crossing the Vistula River. It opened in November, 1875, and was expanded with a second part in 1908. It was blown up for the final time on September 13, 1944, by retreating Germans and was later replaced with the Gdański Bridge.

== History ==
The Kierbedzia Bridge, built in 1864, was originally planned as a railway bridge, connecting the Petersburg train station (now Warszawa Wileńska station) with the Vienna train station (Dworzec Wiedeński, which was demolished in 1944). These plans were abandoned and the bridge was built solely for road transport (with tracks for horse-drawn trams). It was decided soon after to build a railway bridge in a different place in Warsaw.

The choice fell much further north, at the Warsaw Citadel (south of the fortress). This bridge was built from April, 1873 and was opened in November, 1875. It was simply called the "Second Bridge" (as it was the second Warsaw bridge crossing the Vistula). Officially it was called the "Railway Bridge", even though it was both a rail and road bridge. The bridge had a rail track running on one level and the lower level was designed for pedestrian and vehicular traffic which was originally intended only for military traffic but civilian traffic was allowed as well.

The bridge turned out to be insufficient, mainly because it only had one rail track. For this reason, by 1908 the "Second Railway Bridge" was built. It was also known as the "Fourth Bridge" (after the third Poniatowski Bridge, which was built from 1904 to 1914). It was built right next to the first (basically as one bridge) and had two railway tracks. The existing Railway Bridge was handed to the city and adapted for road and pedestrian traffic only.

Both bridges shared the fate of other bridges in Warsaw - on August 5, 1915, they were blown up by the retreating Russian forces. The bridge from 1875 lost three spans while the other bridge from 1908 lost four central spans (the third, fourth, fifth and sixth, counting from the Citadel).

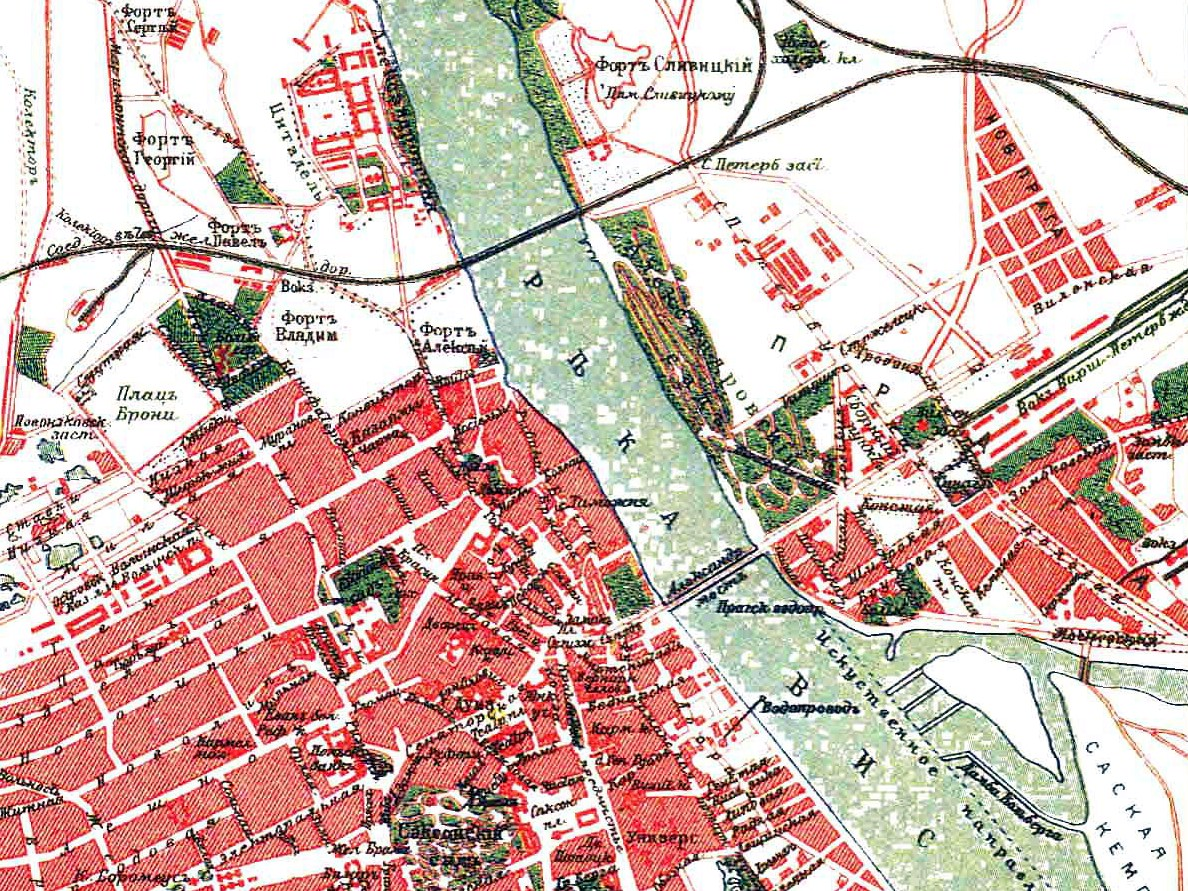
A map from 1900 showing the Citadel Bridge as one of only two bridges in Warsaw

The Second Bridge was rebuilt by the Germans during World War I. The Fourth Bridge was rebuilt during World War I or just after its completion, and in the summer of 1920 it was rebuilt as a military road bridge under the direction of Bronisław Plebiński.

Both bridges were again blown up on 13 September 1944 by Germans withdrawing from Praga.

Well after World War II in 1959, the new Gdański Bridge was built upon the pillars of the old bridge. The bridge today stands in exactly the same place as its pre-war counterparts.

In 2009, parts of the old bridge were excavated to be exhibited in public with a fragment Kierbedzia Bridge rediscovered in 2011.
