= John Paul II Bridge, Puławy =

John Paul II Bridge
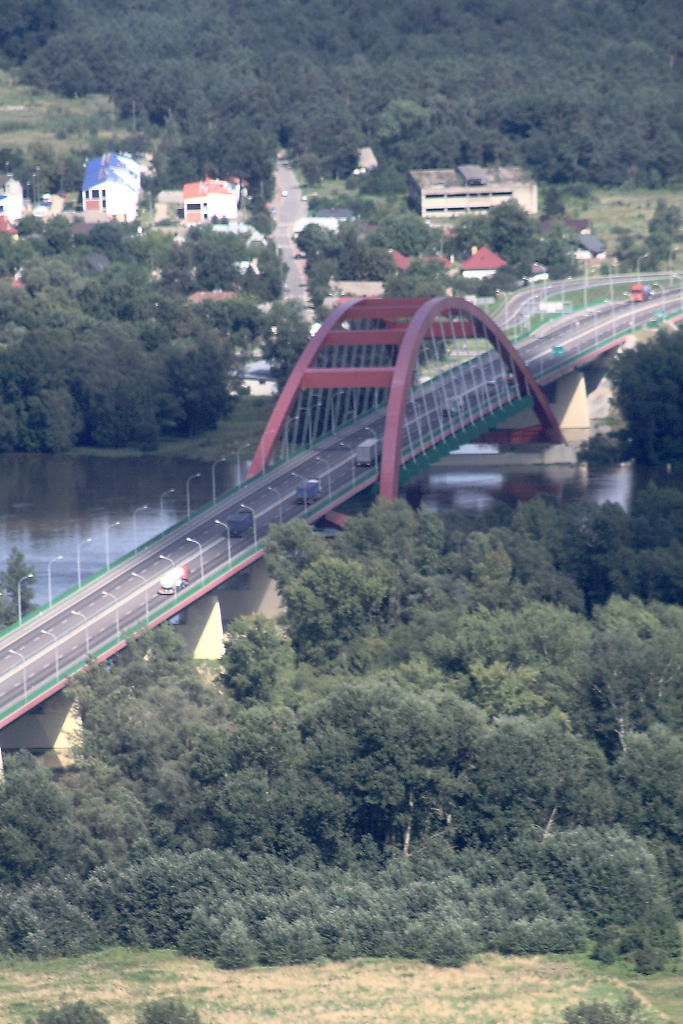
- Coordinates: 51°26′13″N 21°56′28″E
- Carries: Motor vehicles, Bicycles, Pedestrians
- Crosses: Vistula River
- Locale: Puławy, Poland
- Official name: Most im. Jana Pawła II

Characteristics
- Design: Through-arch bridge
- Material: Steel
- Total length: 1,038.2 metres (3,406 ft)
- Width: 22.3 metres (73 ft)
- Longest span: 212 metres (696 ft)

History
- Construction start: 7 March 2006
- Opened: 11 July 2008

Location
- Interactive map of John Paul II Bridge

The John Paul II Bridge (New Pulawy bridge) is an arch bridge over the Vistula River in Puławy, Poland.

With its arch main span of 212 metres (696 ft), it is the longest arch bridge in Poland. The bridge consists of two symmetrical steel arches that rise 38.27 metres (125.6 ft) across the span. The 21.76-metre-wide (71.4 ft) deck is hung from the arches with 112 steel rods.

The bridge is named after Pope John Paul II and was completed on 11 July 2008.

The bridge was built in the first stage of Puławy bypass, 12.7 km (7.9 mi) long, which is part of the future Expressway S12 (Poland) leading towards the Polish border with Ukraine.

The European Regional Development Fund had contributed towards the financing of the bridge construction.
