= Esperanto Bridge =

Esperanto Bridge Most Esperanto
- Coordinates: 53°07′15″N 18°01′23″E
- Crosses: Brda River
- Locale: Bydgoszcz, Poland

Location
- Interactive map of Esperanto Bridge

The Esperanto Bridge (Polish: Most Esperanto) is a pedestrian bridge in Bydgoszcz, Poland.

It was named after Esperanto on the 125th anniversary of the language. The naming ceremony took place on October 27, 2012.
