= General Stefan Grot-Rowecki Bridge =

General Stefan "Grot" Rowecki Bridge Most gen. Stefana Grota-Roweckiego w Warszawie
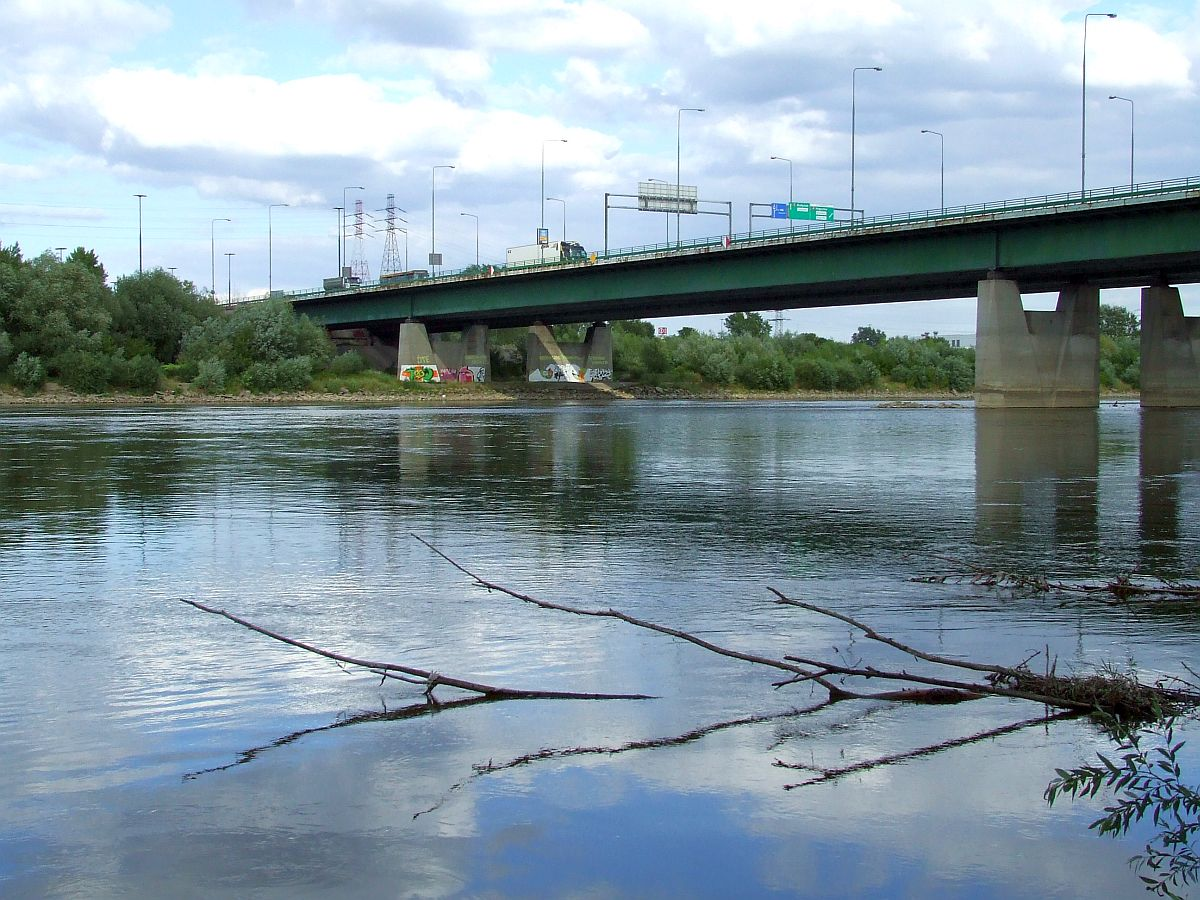
- The General Stefan "Grot" Rowecki Bridge
- Coordinates: 52°17′14″N 20°59′43″E
- Carries: Road transport, Pedestrian, Bicycles
- Crosses: Vistula River
- Locale: Warsaw
- Preceded by: Citadel Rail Bridge
- Followed by: Maria Skłodowska-Curie Bridge

Characteristics
- Total length: 645 m
- Width: 46 m

History
- Construction start: 1977
- Opened: November 28, 1981
- Inaugurated: November 28, 1981

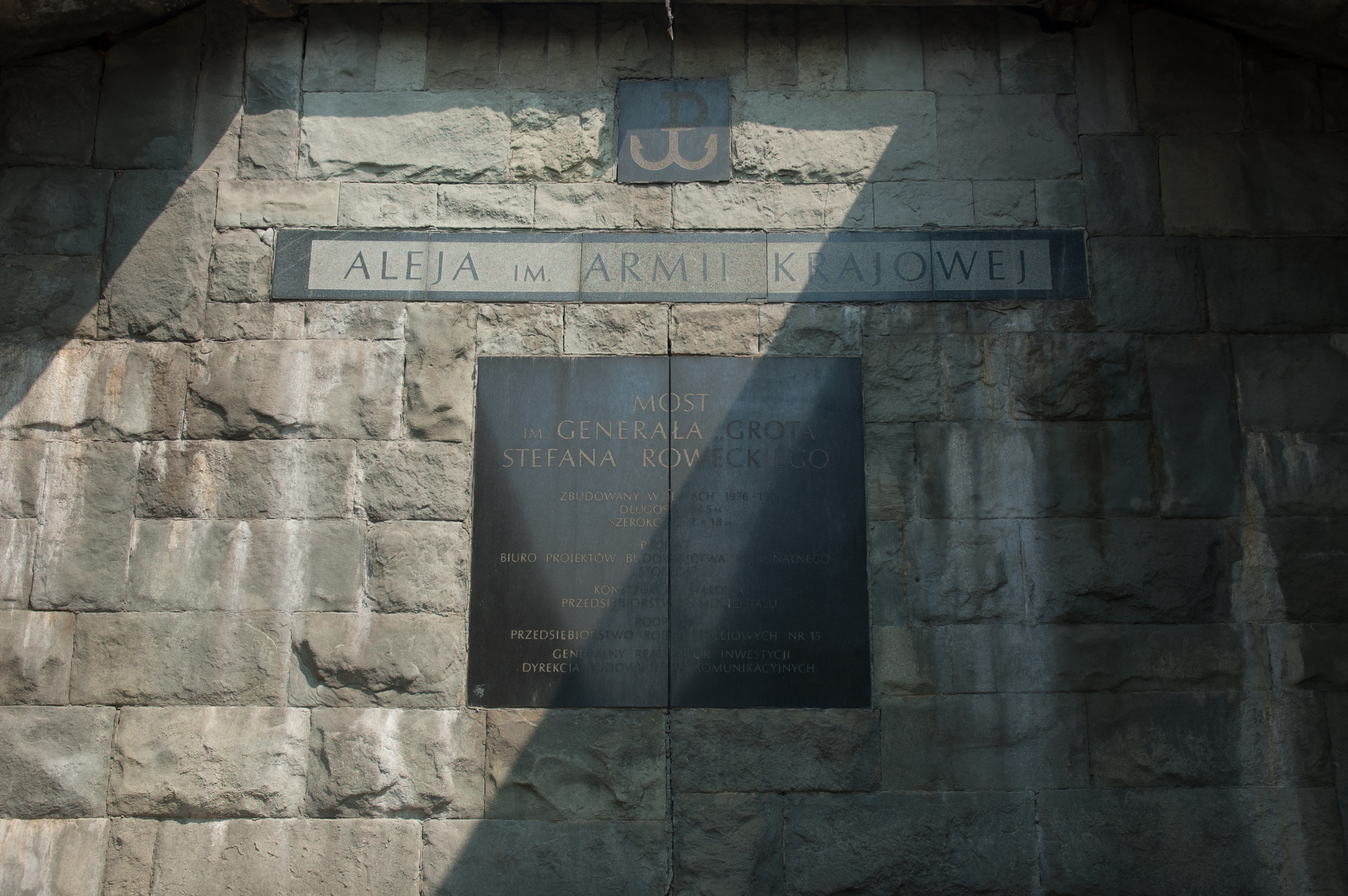
The dedication plaque

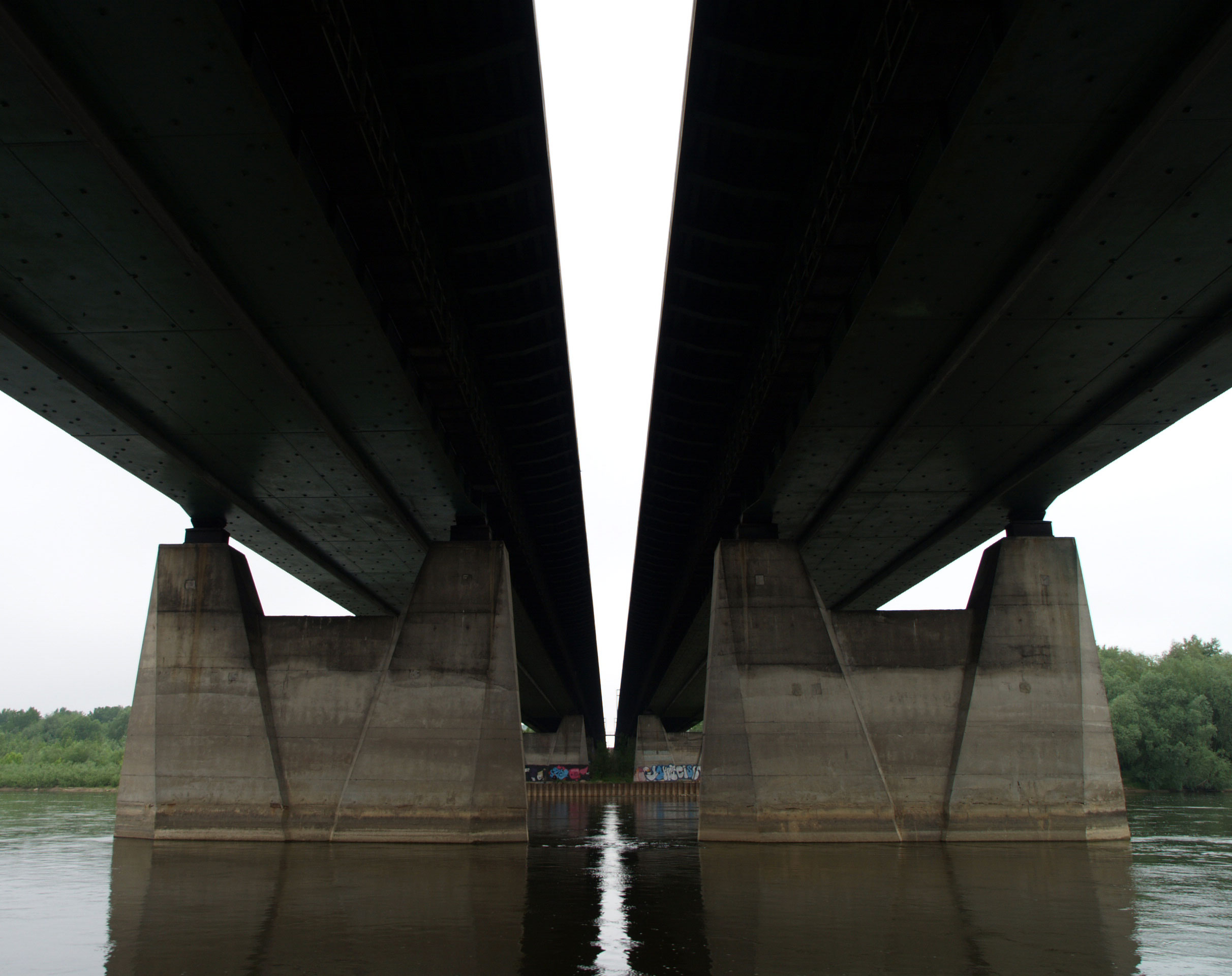
The structure of the bridge

The General Stefan "Grot" Rowecki Bridge (sometimes called the Toruń Bridge, the Grot-Roweckiego Bridge or the Grot Bridge) is a bridge over the Vistula River in Warsaw. It was built from 1977 to 1981 as part of the Trasa Toruńska major thoroughfare by Przedsiębiorstwo Robót Kolejowych No. 15 (the abutments and supports) and Mostostal (the supporting structure and installation). Today, it is part of the S8 expressway, forming the northern bypass of Warsaw.

== History ==
The first plans for the bridge were from the 1960s. It was originally planned as a bridge suspended on two pylons. The design was changed for cost reasons. The final design was designed by a team of engineers at the "Stolica" design office under the direction of Witold Witkowski.

The bridge was dedicated and opened on November 28, 1981. This was during a period of activity by the "Solidarity" movement. As a concession from the Polish People's Republic, the bridge was named for general Stefan Rowecki (whose pseudonym was "Grot"), prominent for his role as the leader of the Polish Underground State during World War 2, which was an extraordinary event in the communist country at that time. The dedication of the bridge turned into a mass demonstration by army veterans and the democratic opposition.

== Description ==
Next to the Siekierkowski Bridge, the General Stefan "Grot" Rowecki Bridge is one of the largest bridges in Warsaw and one of the busiest. The bridge is 645 meters long and it consists of two structurally independent parts, each of which currently has five lanes.

The bridge originally had eight lanes. It was almost inaccessible to pedestrians and cyclists, with bicycles prohibited on the Toruń thoroughfare and the bridges two very narrow sidewalks separated from the roadway by traffic barriers, impeding the passage of bikes.

== Reconstruction for the S8 expressway ==
In September 2009, the General Directorate for National Roads and Highways (GDDKiA) began an extensive refurbishment of the Toruń thoroughfare, along with the bridge, to upgrade it into an expressway. The bridge was widened to ten lanes (five in each direction), four central lanes carry express traffic, while the six lanes on the sides serve local traffic with interchanges with streets running along the river. After the completion of the reconstruction and the construction of a link between Konotopa and Powązkowska Street, the whole route forms a part of the S8 expressway. The widening of the bridge also allowed adding a dedicated cycling lane and wide walkway along the sides of the bridge.

The project was planned for 2008 through to 2010, but the city's problems with the construction of the new Maria Skłodowska-Curie Bridge caused investment delays because of the lack of alternative routes during the reconstruction of the bridge.

The contract for reconstruction was finally signed in July 2013 and the work finished by October 2015 and the bridge has reopened. Modernization of the bridge involved widening of two independent decks with braced cantilevers by a total of more than 9 m and strengthening the structure by external prestressing. The design included increasing the load capacity of the bridge by using over 100 straight prestressed tendons on each of two superstructures.
