= Maria Skłodowska-Curie Bridge, Warsaw =

Twin-span bridge across the Vistula River in Warsaw, Poland

Maria Skłodowska-Curie-Bridge Most Marii Skłodowskiej-Curie
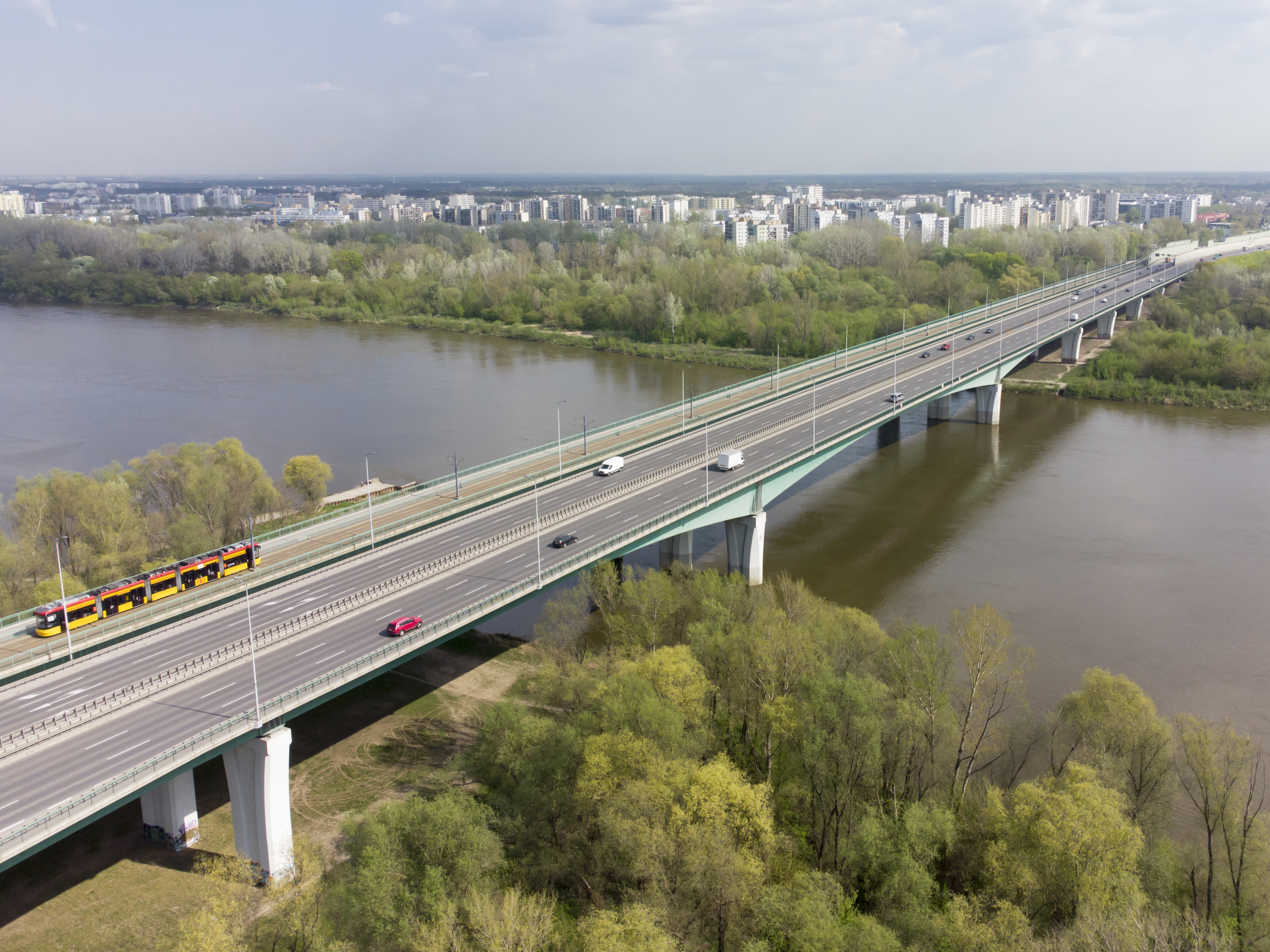
- Maria Skłodowska-Curie Bridge
- Coordinates: 52°18′24.4″N 20°57′5.8″E
- Carries: Motor vehicles, Light rail, Bicycles, Pedestrians
- Crosses: Vistula River
- Locale: Bielany and Białołęka, Warsaw, Poland
- Official name: Most Marii Skłodowskiej-Curie
- Other name: Most Północny ("Northern Bridge")
- Named for: Maria Skłodowska-Curie
- Preceded by: General Stefan Grot-Rowecki Bridge

Characteristics
- Design: Beam bridge
- Material: Steel, Reinforced concrete
- Trough construction: Steel
- Pier construction: Steel, Reinforced concrete
- Total length: 795 metres (2,608 ft)
- Width: 46 metres (151 ft)
- Height: 9 metres (30 ft)
- Longest span: 160 metres (520 ft)
- No. of spans: 10 •45 metres (148 ft) •65 metres (213 ft) •110 metres (360 ft) •160 metres (520 ft) •110 metres (360 ft) •66.66 metres (218.7 ft) •66.67 metres (218.7 ft) •66.67 metres (218.7 ft) •60 metres (200 ft) •45 metres (148 ft)

History
- Designer: Schüßler-Plan Ingenieurgesellschaft GmbH
- Constructed by: •Pol-Aqua •Sando •Kromiss - Bis
- Fabrication by: Vistal
- Construction start: 20 May 2009
- Construction end: March 2012
- Construction cost: ca. 977 mln PLN
- Opened: 24 March 2012

Location
- Interactive map of Maria Skłodowska-Curie-Bridge

The Maria Skłodowska-Curie Bridge (Polish: Most Marii Skłodowskiej-Curie) is a bridge over the Vistula River in Warsaw, Poland, linking the northern suburbs of Białołęka and Bielany. The structure actually consists of three parallel bridges, two for motor vehicles and one for light rail, bicycles, and pedestrians. The first two parts were opened on March 24, 2012 making it the eighth road bridge in the capital of Poland, and it is now complete with the first tram line launched 21 January 2013.

The construction started with a sod turning ceremony on 3 June 2009. The work was carried out by Pol-Aqua in cooperation with Spanish group Sando and Kromiss-Bis.

During the design and construction works, the bridge was tentatively named the North Bridge due to its most northerly location. The President of Warsaw, Hanna Gronkiewicz-Waltz, announced that she would petition the Warsaw City Council to name the bridge after Pope John Paul II. However, on 1 December 2011, the bridge name was officially changed to Maria Skłodowska-Curie Bridge to honor the Polish double Nobel Prize winner, against the opinions of citizens and District Councils of both Bielany and Białołęka districts.

== Location ==
The width of the river at the bridge is about 650 metres. On the west bank of the Vistula the bridge forms an extension of gen. Marii Wittek Avenue, and on the east gen. Ryszarda Kuklińskiego Avenue. This is the second river crossing in Warsaw, after Most Świętokrzyski, which is at ground level on both banks of the river. At Białołęka, the route proceeds on earthen embankments, as well as at Bielany, where the route joins the Wisłostrada, the principal north-south route through central Warsaw. The most complex intersection in Warsaw is located here. At this point the interchange connects five multi-lane streets, three tramway lines and junctions for local roads. Since 2015 it forms a part of the national road DK 61, which starts at the Wisłostrada junction.
