= John Paul II Bridge (Gdańsk) =

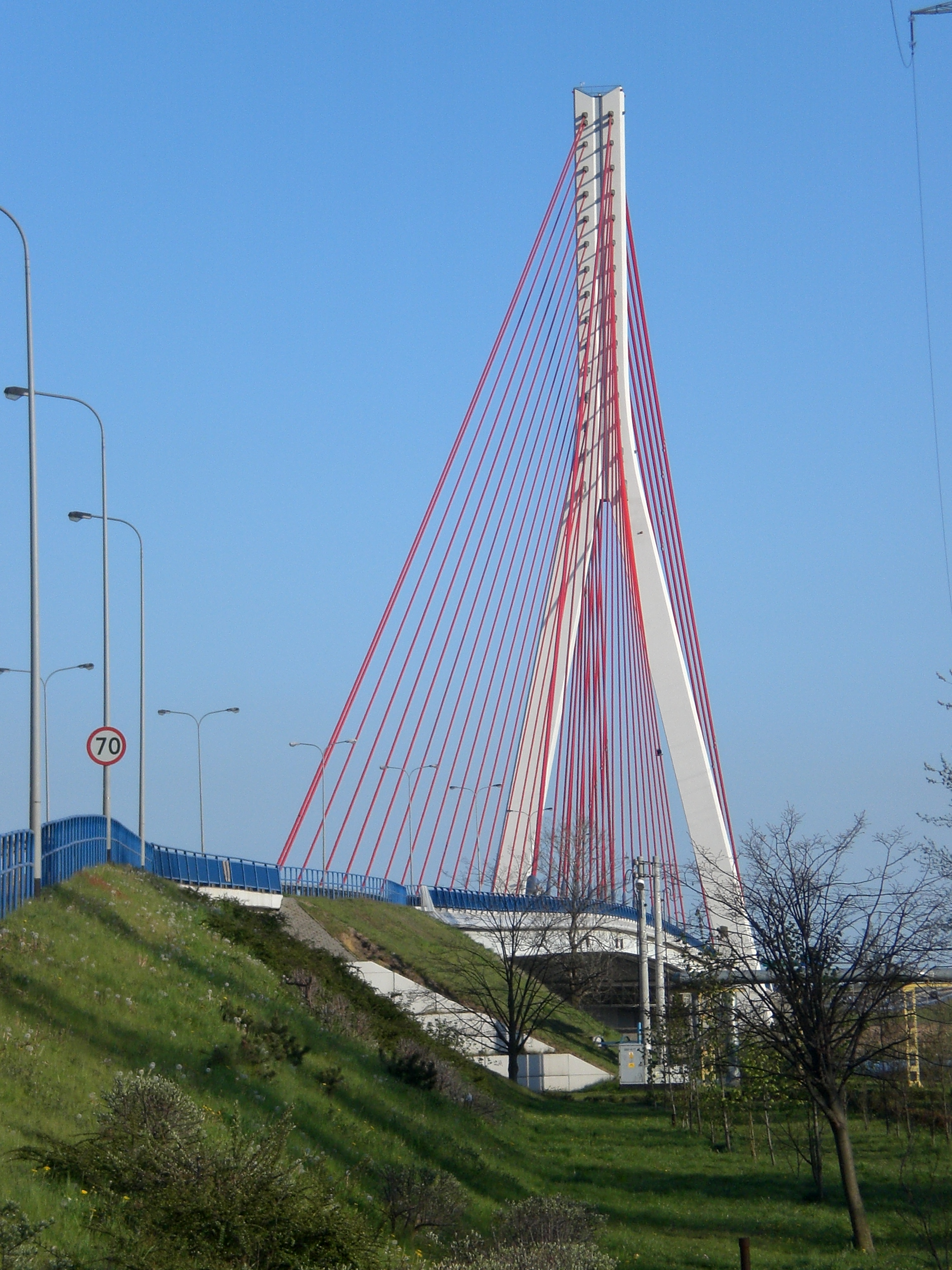
- John Paul II Bridge
- Coordinates: 54°21′21″N 18°41′41″E
- Carries: Motor vehicles
- Crosses: Martwa Wisła River
- Locale: Gdańsk, Poland
- Official name: Most III Tysiąclecia im. Jana Pawła II

Characteristics
- Design: Cable-stayed bridge, inverted-Y pylon, semi-fan arrangement
- Material: Composite steel-reinforced concrete
- Total length: 380 metres (1,250 ft)
- Width: 20.31 metres (66.6 ft)
- Height: 99.89 metres (327.7 ft)
- Longest span: 230 metres (750 ft)
- No. of spans: 3
- Load limit: 50 ton

History
- Designer: Krzysztof Wąchalski
- Construction start: 2 August 1999
- Construction end: 15 October 2001
- Opened: 9 November 2001

Location
- Interactive map of John Paul II Bridge

The John Paul II Bridge (Polish: Most Jana Pawła II), also known as the Third Millennium Bridge (Polish: Most Trzeciego Tysiąclecia), is a cable-stayed road bridge located in Gdańsk, Poland, opened on 9 November 2001 and linking the Northern Port of Gdańsk with the Tricity Ring Road (S7). It crosses the Dead Vistula.

== Characteristics ==
Opened on 9 November 2001, the bridge has four lanes, two per each direction of traffic. It has a width of 20.31 metres (66.6 ft), a height of 99.89 metres (327.7 ft), and its main span measures 230 metres (750 ft) in length. The cost of constructing it totalled 150 million zł.

== Construction ==
The bridge began being constructed in August 1999. Scaffolding was not used, and the bridge's components were transported by barges down the Vistula. During construction, it was initially called the Third Millennium Bridge. When it was named after John Paul II, the media began referring to it also as the John Paul II Third Millennium Bridge (Polish: Most Trzeciego Tysiąclecia im. Jana Pawła II).

== Gallery ==
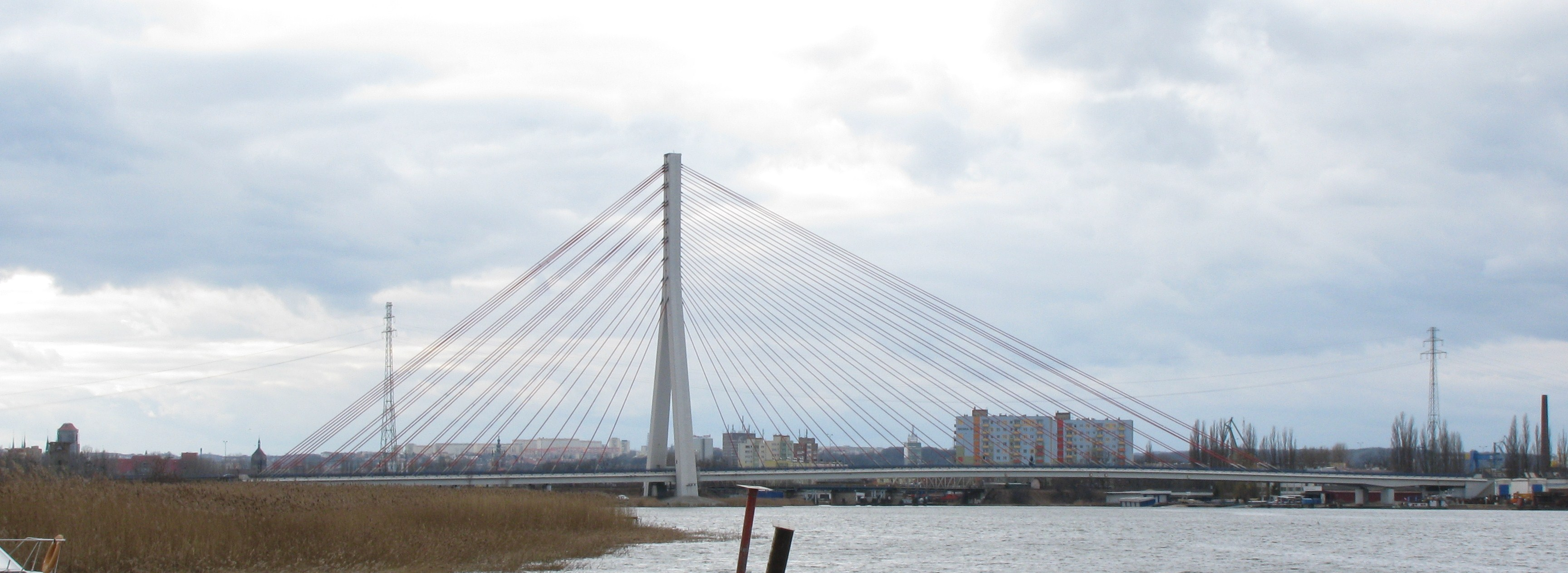
The bridge from a distance, 2010

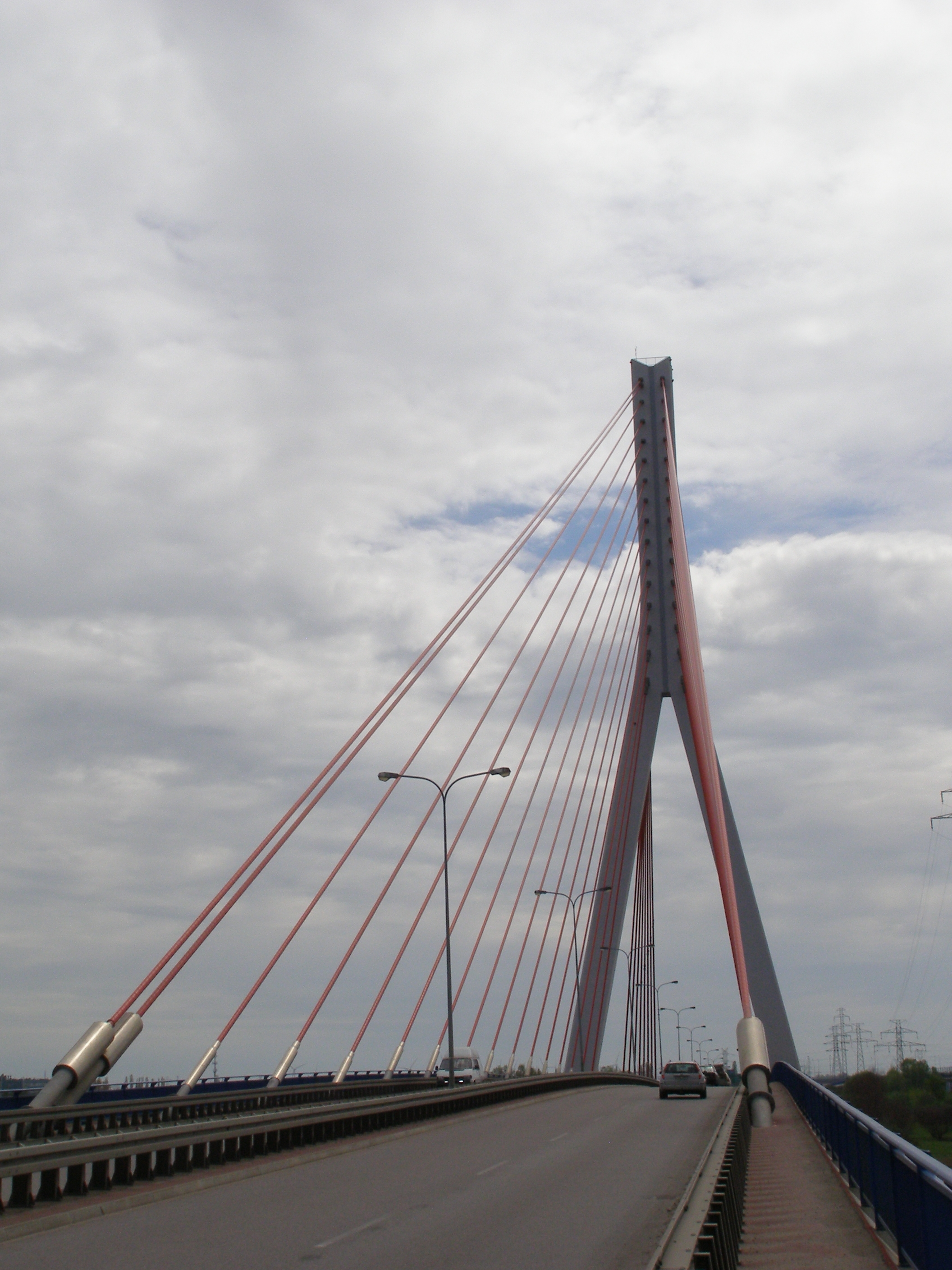
Driving onto the bridge

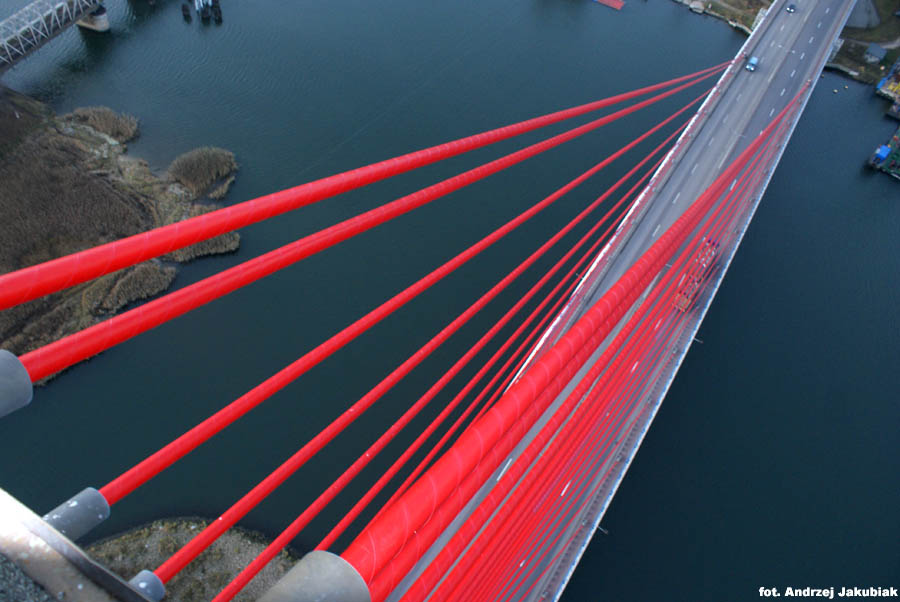
View from the top of the pylons

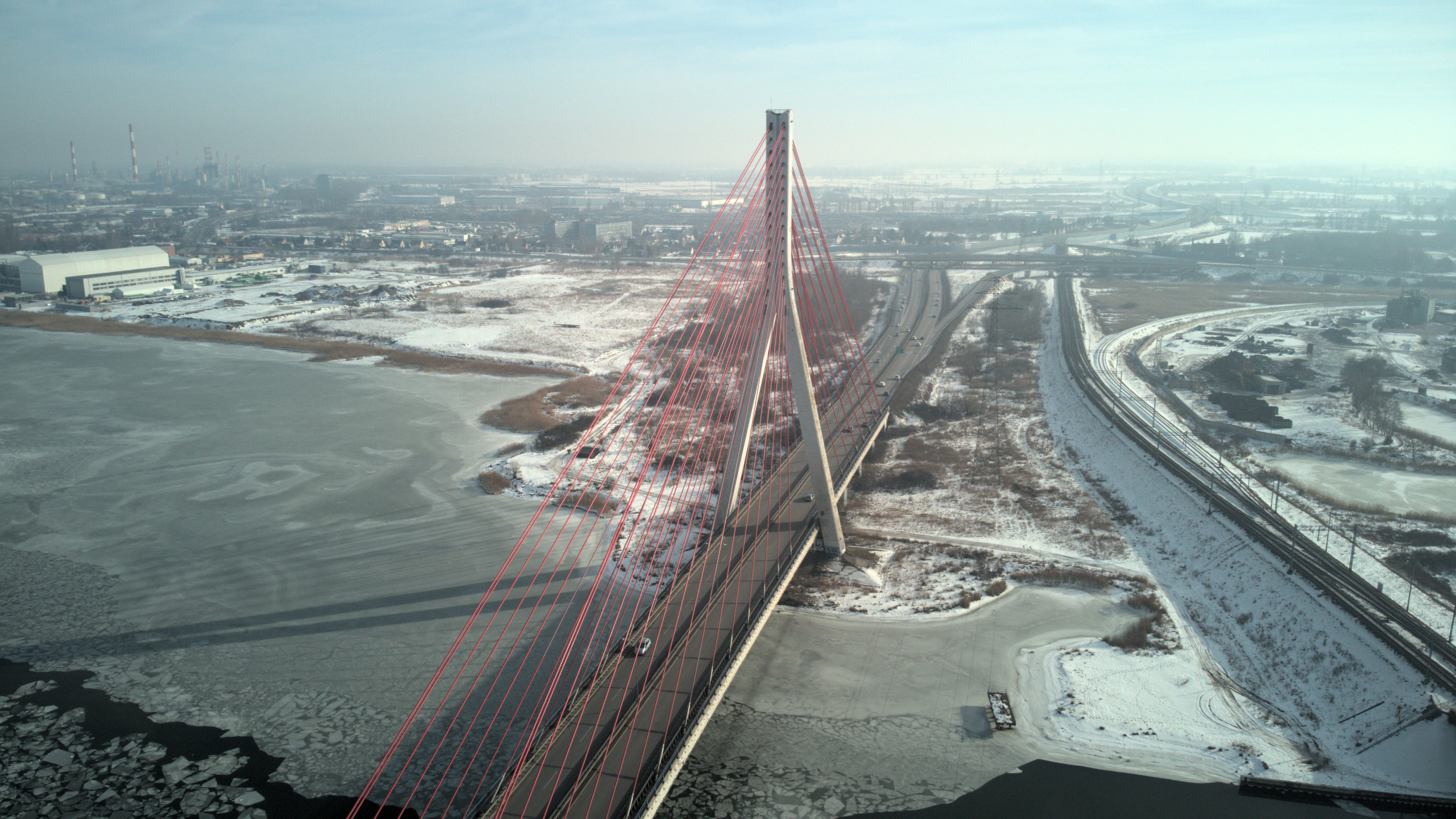
The bridge in winter
