= Peace Bridge, Wrocław =

Peace Bridge Most Pokoju
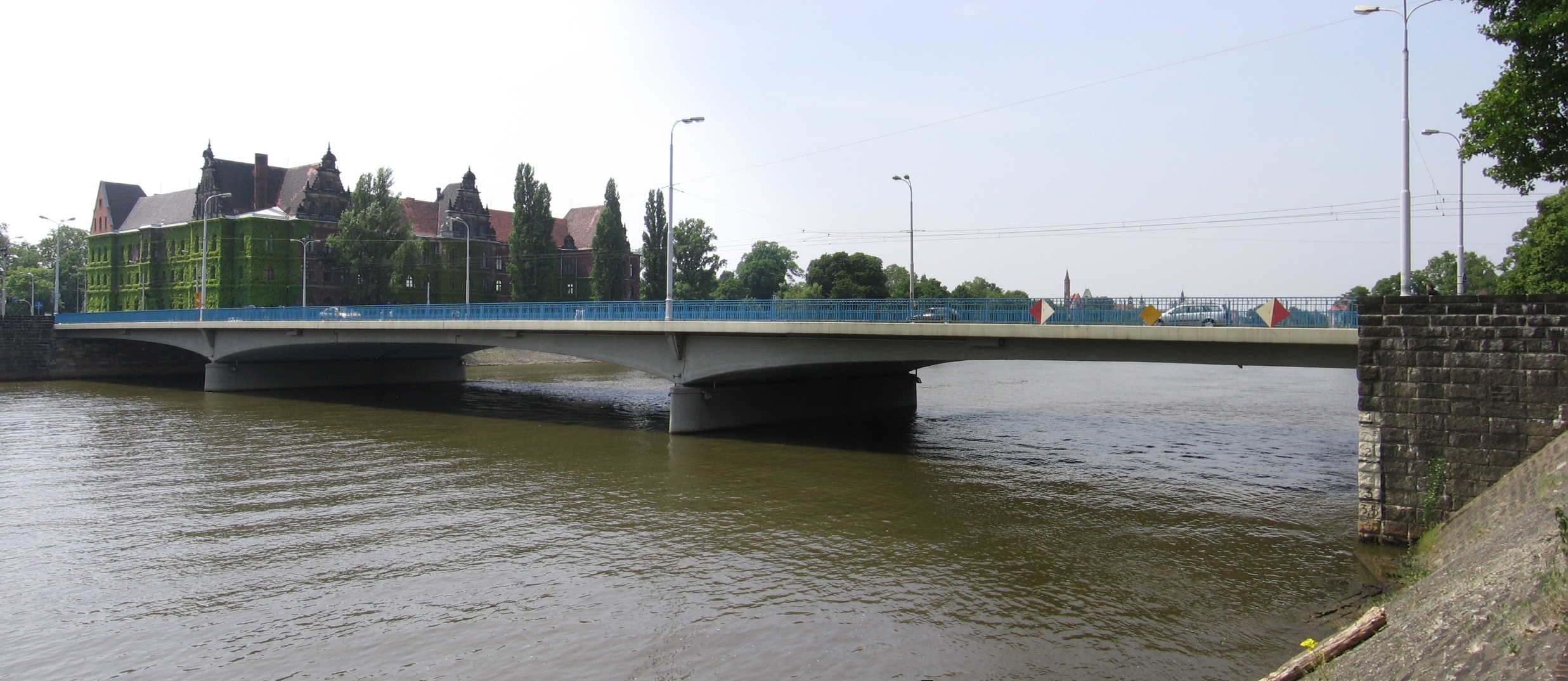
- Coordinates: 51°06′42″N 17°02′56″E
- Crosses: Oder

Characteristics
- Total length: 125.3 m (411.1 ft)
- Width: 25.7 m (84.3 ft)

History
- Opened: 1959; 66 years ago

Peace Bridge (Polish: Most Pokoju) is a bridge located in Wrocław, Poland, constructed between 1954 and 1959. It spans over 124 metres and was designed by professor Jan Kmita. At first known as Voivodeship Bridge (Polish: Most Wojewódzki), it was renamed Peace Bridge in 1966.

Before World War II, there was another bridge in the same place, Lessingbrücke, named after the German philosopher and poet Gotthold Ephraim Lessing. The structure was built in 1875 using iron and was destroyed in 1945 during the siege of Breslau.

Currently, the bridge serves as a crucial connection for both pedestrian and road traffic, linking the northern and southern parts of Wrocław.
