= Zwierzyniecki Bridge =

Bridge in Wrocław, Poland

Coordinates: 51°06′29″N 17°04′12″E

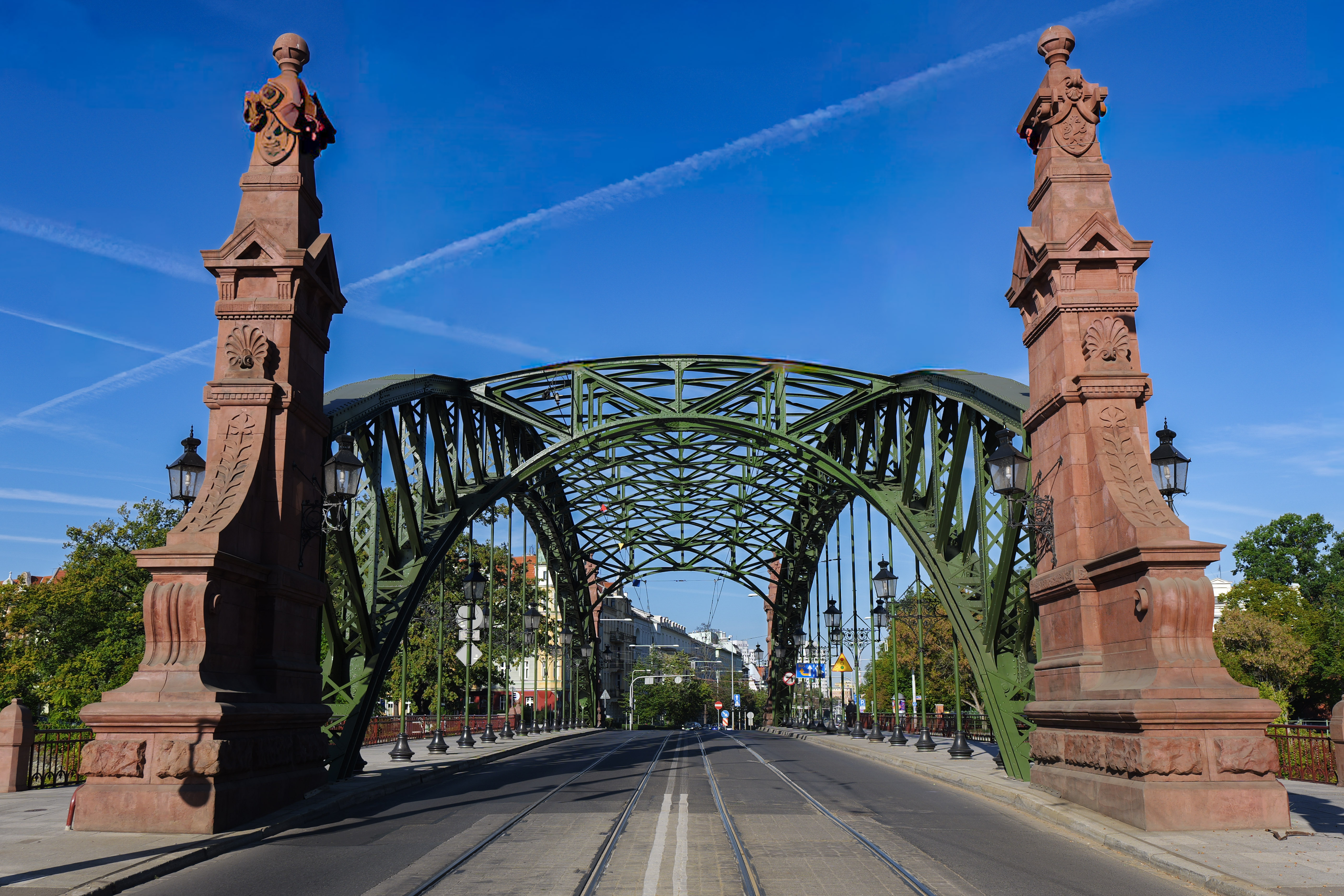
The Zwierzyniecki Bridge, seen from the east, in 2025

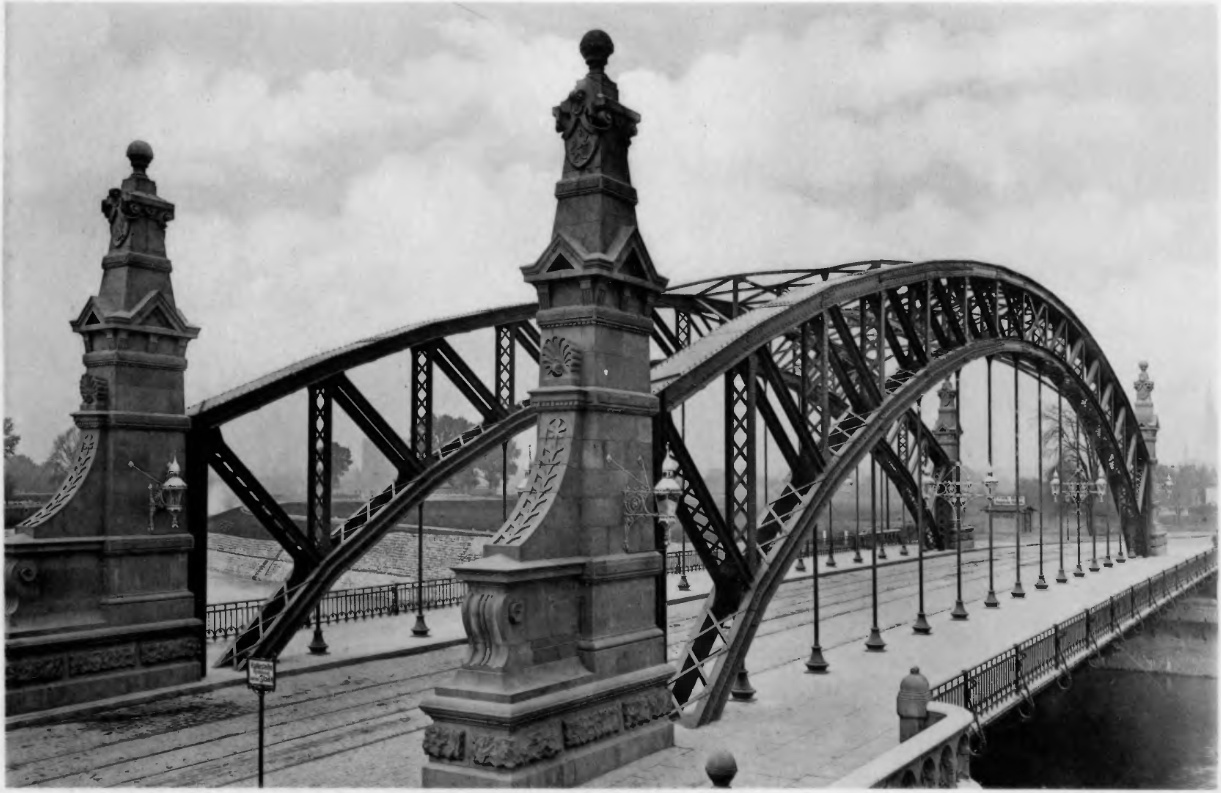
A photograph of the bridge soon after its completion in 1901

The Zwierzyniecki Bridge is a historic truss bridge located in the eastern part of Wrocław, Poland. The bridge spans the Oder River and is in the immediate vicinity of Wrocław Zoo and the exhibition grounds of the Centennial Hall.

== History ==
The bridge was built around 1655 and was originally wooden.

Between 1895 and 1897, Karl Klimm designed a new bridge under the supervision of the city architect, Richard Plüddemann and with the help of engineer A. Fruhwirth. The new truss bridge is a single-span steel structure, supported by granite abutments and consists of two parallel-braced rib steel arches placed 12.5 metres apart.

The characteristic features of the bridge are four decorative Art Nouveau obelisks made of red sandstone. The bridge is also illuminated at night by bespoke period street lamps.

During the siege of Festung Breslau in 1945, German soldiers, who wanted to prevent an expected attack from the east of the city, prepared to demolish the bridge using explosives to halt the Red Army's advance. The Red Army troops, however, launched an assault from the south, saving Zwierzyniecki bridge from being destruction.

A marina (Przystań Zwierzyniecka), from which tourist excursion boats launch, is located not far from the Zwierzyniecki bridge and Wrocław Zoo.
