= RA3 multiple unit =

Russian diesel multiple unit

RA3 multiple unit Orlan
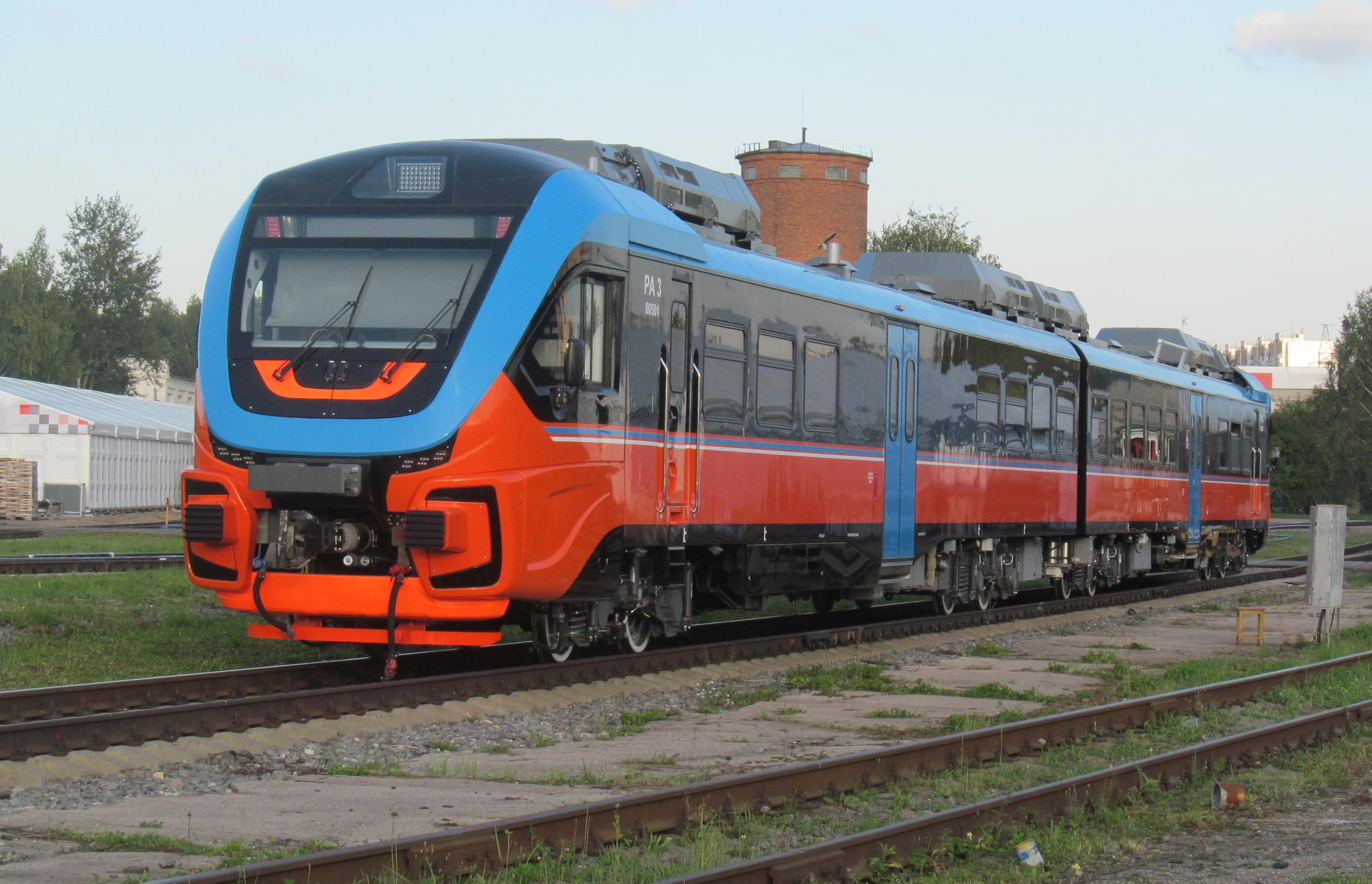
- RA3-005 during the PRO//Dvizhenie.Expo exhibition in Shcherbinka in 2019

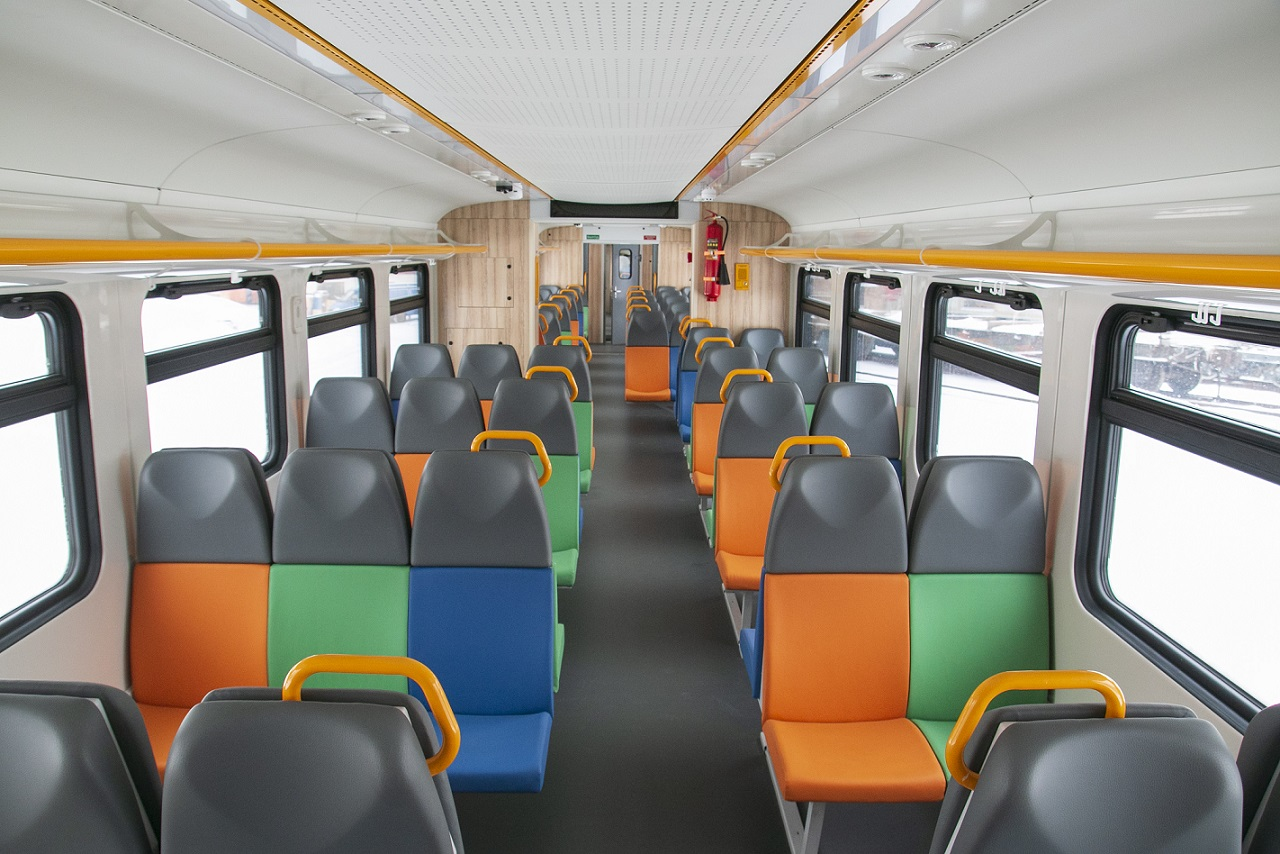
- RA3 multiple unit interior in 2020
- Stock type: Diesel multiple unit
- In service: 2019–present
- Manufacturer: Metrovagonmash
- Designer: Evgeny Bandurin
- Replaced: ACh2
- Constructed: 2019–2022
- Entered service: 2019
- Number built: 91 (220 wagons, including 210 in RA3 deliveries and additional 10)
- Formation: 2 cars (Motor car+Motor car); 3 cars (Motor car+Trailer car+Motor car)
- Fleet numbers: 001-091
- Capacity: In third class: 185 (Motor car 753.10); 177 (Motor car 753.11); 244 (Trailer car 753.20)
- Operators: Russian Railways; CSPC; SSPC; Sakhalin Passenger Company
- Depot: TCE-15 DVZZHD (South-Sakhalinsk); TC-45 MZhD (Bryansk-I); TCHM-4 SKZhD (Rostov-Main); PM-4 SZD (Danilov); PM-18 GZhD (Kanash); PM-1 KZhD (Simferopol); TC-21 KbshZhD (Dem); TC-11 SVZhD (Nizhny Tagil); TC-15 OZhD (St. Petersburg-Baltic); TC-32 ZUZHD (Chelyabinsk); PM-7 KbshZhD (Ruzaevka); PM-5 SJWD (P.m.)

Specifications
- Car body construction: Stainless steel
- Train length: 47.56 metres (156.0 ft) (2 car)
- Car length: 23.78 metres (78 ft 0 in) (Motor car)
- Width: 3.14 metres (10 ft 4 in)
- Height: 4.69 metres (15 ft 5 in)
- Floor height: 1.3 metres (4 ft 3 in)
- Doors: 2 (Motor car); 4 (Trailer car)
- Wheel diameter: 860–810 millimetres (2 ft 10 in – 2 ft 8 in)
- Wheelbase: 17.15 metres (56 ft 3 in) (Motor car)
- Maximum speed: 120 kilometres per hour (75 mph)
- Weight: 50.50 tonnes (111,300 lb) (Motor car 753.10); 51 tonnes (112,000 lb) (Motor car 753.11); 39.24 tonnes (86,500 lb) (Trailer car 753.20)
- Axle load: Not more than 16 tonnes (35,000 lb)
- Prime mover: MTU 6H 1800 R83
- Power output: 2x 360 kW (480 hp)
- Transmission: Hydraulic (Voith T211 re.4)
- Acceleration: To 60 km/h: 0.37 m/s2 (2 car); 0.25 m/s2 (3 car)
- Braking systems: Hydro-Dynamic, Electro-Pneumatic, Pneumatic, Pneumatic Spring
- Safety systems: BLOCK, CEC-RA3
- Coupling system: SA3 coupler
- Multiple working: yes
- Track gauge: 1,520 mm (4 ft 11 27/32 in)

The RA3 multiple unit (Russian: РА3, named "Orlan", Russian: Орлан) is a class of Russian diesel multiple units (type 2 railbus) built by Metrovagonmash between 2019 and 2022 in Mytishchi, Russia. Along with RA1 and RA2, the multiple unit is classified as a railbus by its manufacturer. The factory type of the multiple unit is model 753. It was developed by TMH Engineering LLC. The 2 car and 3 car variants were built.

As of 2025, the multiple units are operated by Russian Railways, Central Suburban Passenger Company, Northern Suburban Passenger Company, Sakhalin Passenger Company, Bashkortostan Suburban Railway Company, Severo-Western Passenger Company, and other companies.

== History ==
=== Origins ===
Between 2005 and 2015, the Metrovagonmash factory, part of the Russian railway rolling stock manufacturing holding company Transmashholding, mass-produced 2 car and 3 car RA2 class diesel multiple units (model 750.05), which are also officially classified as railbuses, producing a total of over 100 units, the vast majority of which were delivered to Russian railways, and from 2011 to 2016 — 2 car DP-S diesel multiple units (model 750.25) for the Serbian railways.

In 2015, following the end of RA2 production, new technical requirements regarding passenger safety and comfort for railbuses, which also included shorter diesel multiple units, were drawn up in Russia and a number of other post-Soviet countries, and came into force in early 2016. Under the requirements, all new multiple units of this type were to be fitted with crash resistant elements at the front and rear ends of the cars to absorb impact energy during a collision, whilst the passenger compartment was to be fitted with air-conditioning and climate-control systems featuring air purification, as well as spaces for passengers in wheelchairs and lifts to assist them in boarding and alighting from low platforms in one of the cars. Previously manufactured RA2 multiple units did not have crash resistant elements or specially designed spaces for disabled passengers, whilst only certain maintenance multiple units used for inspection runs were fitted with air conditioning.

At the same time, as of 2016, there was a shortage of diesel multiple units on Russia’s non-electrified railways. A significant proportion of commuter routes were instead operated by locomotive-hauled trains with coupled passenger cars, which made additional operational difficulties due to the need to re-couple the diesel locomotives at terminus stations. The use of powerful mainline diesel locomotives to haul small-scale commuter trains was inefficient due to their high fuel consumption; as a result, operators were forced to convert shunting locomotives for passenger traffic, thereby using them for purposes rather than shunting. By the late 2010s, the service life of the ACh2 railcars with APCh2 cars for passenger service was coming to an end, and they also needed for replacement with new diesel multiple units. Consequently, Russia’s largest suburban rail operators, Russian Railways (RZD) and the Central Moscow Suburban Railway (TsPPK), approached Transmashholding requesting to develop new short diesel multiple units that met modern requirements.

=== Development ===
The development of the new RA3 model of diesel multiple units (railbuses) began in late 2017 by TMH Engineering LLC, which, along with Metrovagonmash, forms part of Transmashholding. The design and engineering work was carried out under the supervision of Chief Designer Yevgeny Bandurin at the "City Transport" Design Bureau, a separate division of TMH Engineering LLC, located in Mytishchi at the Metrovagonmash plant, where production of the new multiple nit model was subsequently organised. Representatives of the client (CSPC) were closely involved in the development of the multiple uit, contributing their wishes and suggestions regarding its design.

The design of the RA3 was based on the previous class of diesel multiple units RA2 and DP-S, which was revised to take account of new requirements regarding safety, comfort and the aesthetics of the exterior and interior elements. A new front end for the leading cars was developed, adapted to accommodate crash elements and providing improved visibility for the train crew; the body geometry was modified, making it possible to increase the aisle width between seats, and buffers and couplers with breakaway crash elements were fitted. The passenger compartment was also significantly upgraded: it featured spaces for disabled passengers, lifts and a spacious toilet in one of the cars; the number of seats in the cars was increased; and air conditioning system, CCTV, fire safety and power-saving lighting systems were installed. A new control panel was developed for the driver’s cab, and the multiple unit was fitted with a modern microprocessor-based system. The gearbox ratio was altered, which made it possible to increase the design speed to 120 km/h without significantly changing the engine power output. Based on an analysis of the RA2’s operational performance, a new train braking control system was developed to reduce fuel consumption and maintenance costs, utilising a combination of hydrodynamic and electro-pneumatic braking, and a number of multiple unit components were upgraded to improve operational reliability, resulting in the design service life of the new trains being extended from 25 to 40 years.

The RA3 railbus concept was first unveiled by Transmashholding in 2018. By the end of the year, the Central Public Transport Company (CPPC) had signed a contract with Transmashholding for the supply of 23 RA3 multiple units (17 2-car and 6 3-car sets), to be delivered in 2019–2020.

=== Production and test runs ===
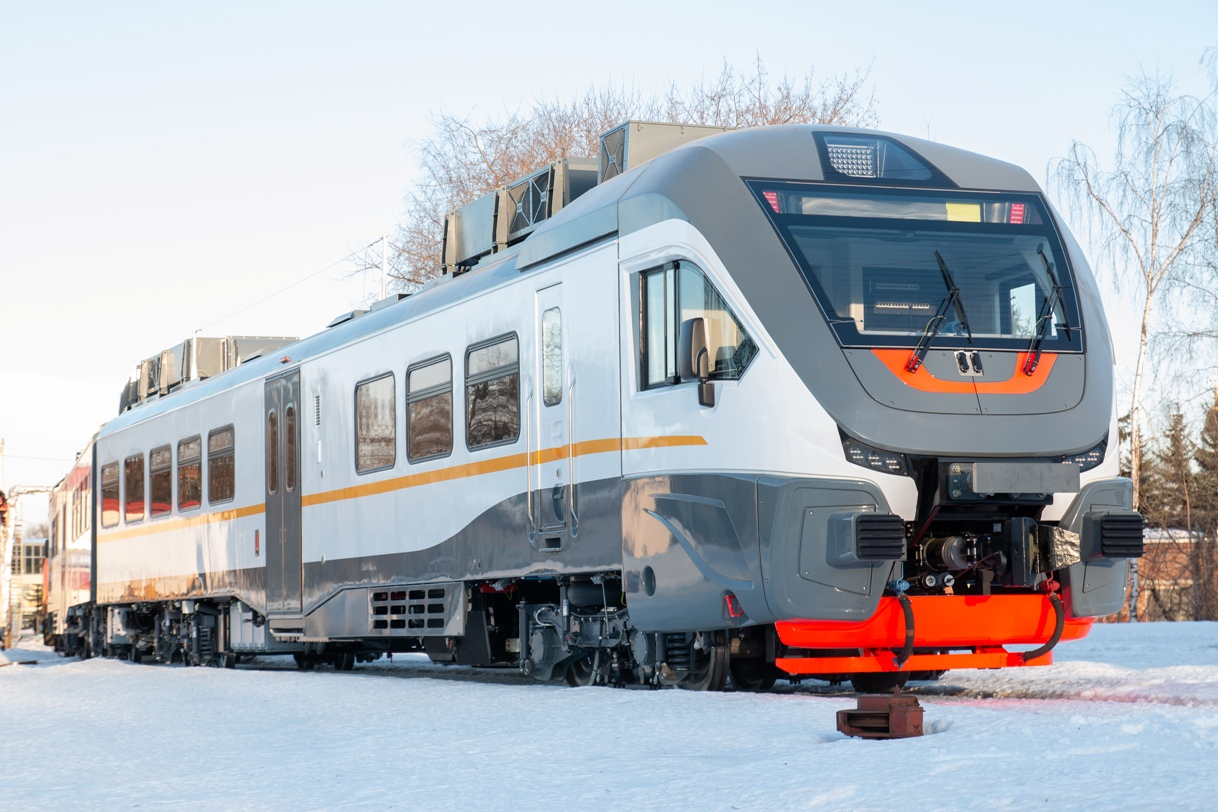
RA3-001 (one of the prototypes) in its original white and grey livery

The first RA3 multiple unit, numbered 001, was built in January 2019, and was unveiled in February at the Likhobory locomotive depot in Moscow. In March 2019, the second unit, numbered 002, was built. Both multiple units were originally painted in the signature white and grey livery of the Central Moscow Suburban Transport Company (CPPC) "Nashe Podmoskovye", which was used for the company’s ED4M and EP2D electric multiple units. In May 2019, a third ‘"Orlan" unit, numbered 003, was delivered to the TsPPK, featuring a new distinctive orange, black and blue livery. This livery has since been applied to all other RA3 multiple units supplied to the Central Moscow Region Public Transport Company, and the first two multiple units were also repainted in this scheme prior to handover to the customer.

On 13 March 2019, certification tests for the RA3 model began. To this end, the first two prototype multiple units were sent to the test track of the All-Russian Scientific Research Institute of Railway Transport (VNIIZhT test track, in the urban district of Shcherbinka). During test runs, the prototype completed a 5,000 km test run; parameters such as ride comfort, braking, average speed, track impact and the performance of the air conditioning system were successful. After leaving the EK VNIIZhT test track, on 1 June of the same year, the multiple unit arrived at the high-speed test track in Belorechensk for further testing. Tests were carried out on the safety margins against wheel derailment, the fatigue resistance margin of the structure under dynamic loads and other parameters; diagnostics were performed on the fire safety and air conditioning systems. This stage was completed slightly ahead of schedule. On 22 July, a certificate was received confirming the RA3 class complied with the requirements for railway transport safety and passenger services. In September 2019, the first 3 car RA3 multiple unit, numbered 018, was delivered, which was soon sent to the VNIIZHT test track together with the 2 car multiple unit numbered 013 for testing; following the completion of the test runs in February 2020, Metrovagonmash received a certificate for it.

Delivery of a consist of three RA3 multiple units (RA3-035, 038 and 041) for YUPPK, hauled by an EP1M electric locomotive

In July 2019, the first batch of 2 car multiple units for Sakhalin Passenger Company JSC was manufactured and prepared for dispatch. Both three of the multiple units were numbered 024–026, as the first 23 numbers had been reserved for a batch of trains destined for the Central Pacific Passenger Company (CPPC), although most of them had not yet been manufactured at that time. The multiple units were painted in Russian Railways’ corporate livery of red, light grey and dark grey. Subsequently, all further "Orlan" multiple units not intended for the Central Pacific Railway continued the numbering sequence from 027 and were given a similar livery. In 2020, a batch of 9 multiple units was delivered to the Southern Pacific Railway; these were painted blue with white stripes and a wave-pattern design. In the same year, three multiple units numbered 044–046 (two 3-car and one 2-car) were built, equipped with premium class cars featuring second class seats.

Multiple unit production figures as of February 2023:

Build date	Formation	Number of multiple units	Multiple unit fleet numbers	Number of cars	
Build date	Formation	Number of multiple units	Multiple unit fleet numbers	Motor car	Trailer car
2019	2	28	001–017, 024–034	58	1
2019	3	1	018	58	1
2020	2	17	037, 039–043, 046, 049–055, 057–059	60	13
2020	3	13	019-023, 035, 036, 038, 044, 045, 047, 048, 056	60	13
2021	2	11	066—068, 073—080	42	10
2021	3	10	060—065, 069—072	42	10
2022	2	7	081, 083, 085, 086, 088, 090, 091	22	4
2022	3	4	082, 084, 087, 089	22	4
Total	2	63	001—017, 024—034, 037, 039—043, 046, 049—055, 057—059, 066—068, 073—081, 083, 085, 088, 098, 091	182	28
Total	3	28	018-023, 035, 036, 038, 044, 045, 047, 048, 056, 060—065, 069—072, 082, 084, 087, 089	182	28

In the mid-2020s, Russian Railways purchased 10 additional trailer cars to increase the capacity of certain multiple units.

RA3 livery variants

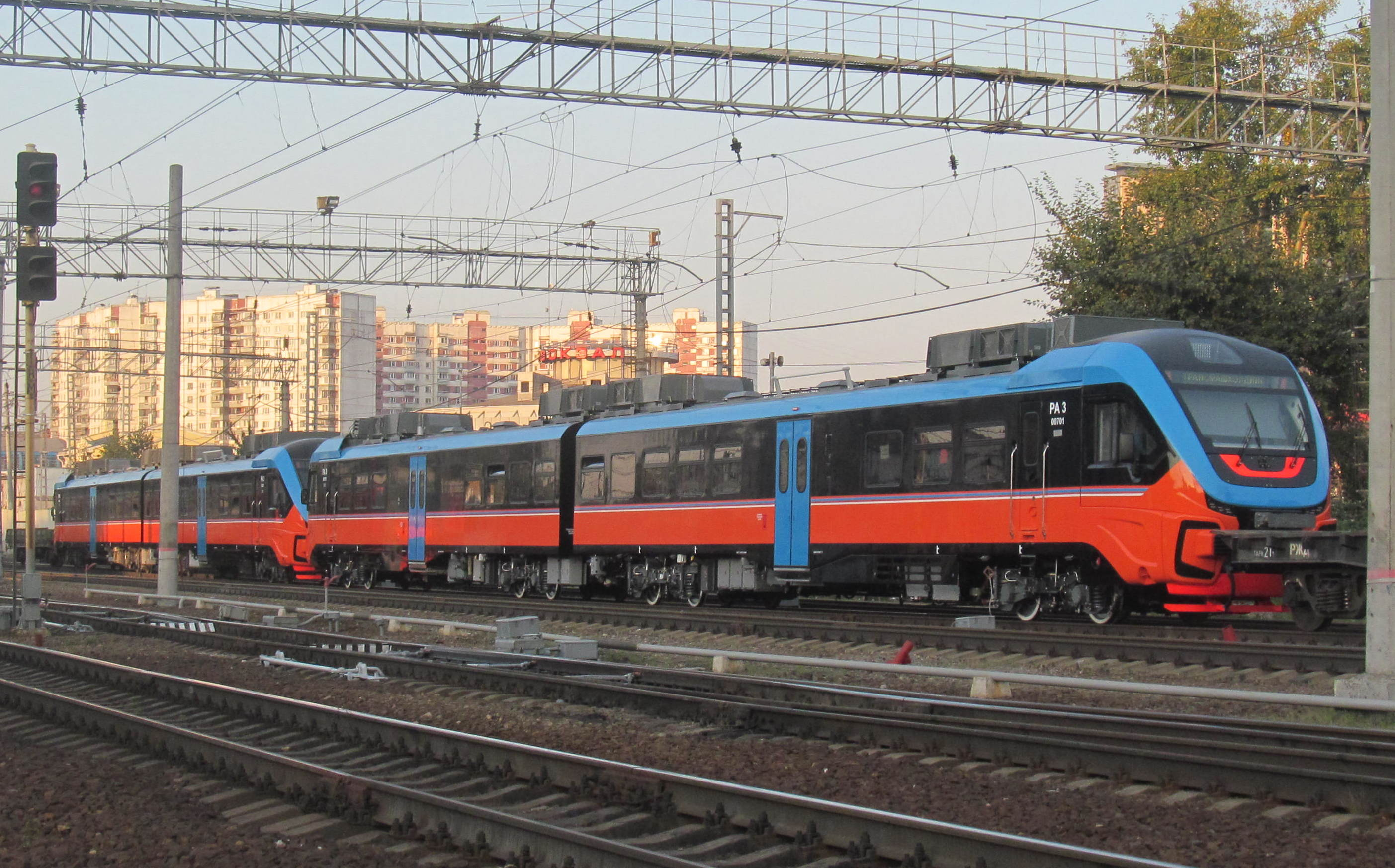
The 2 car RA3-002 and 007 multiple units in the CPPC’s orange, black and blue livery

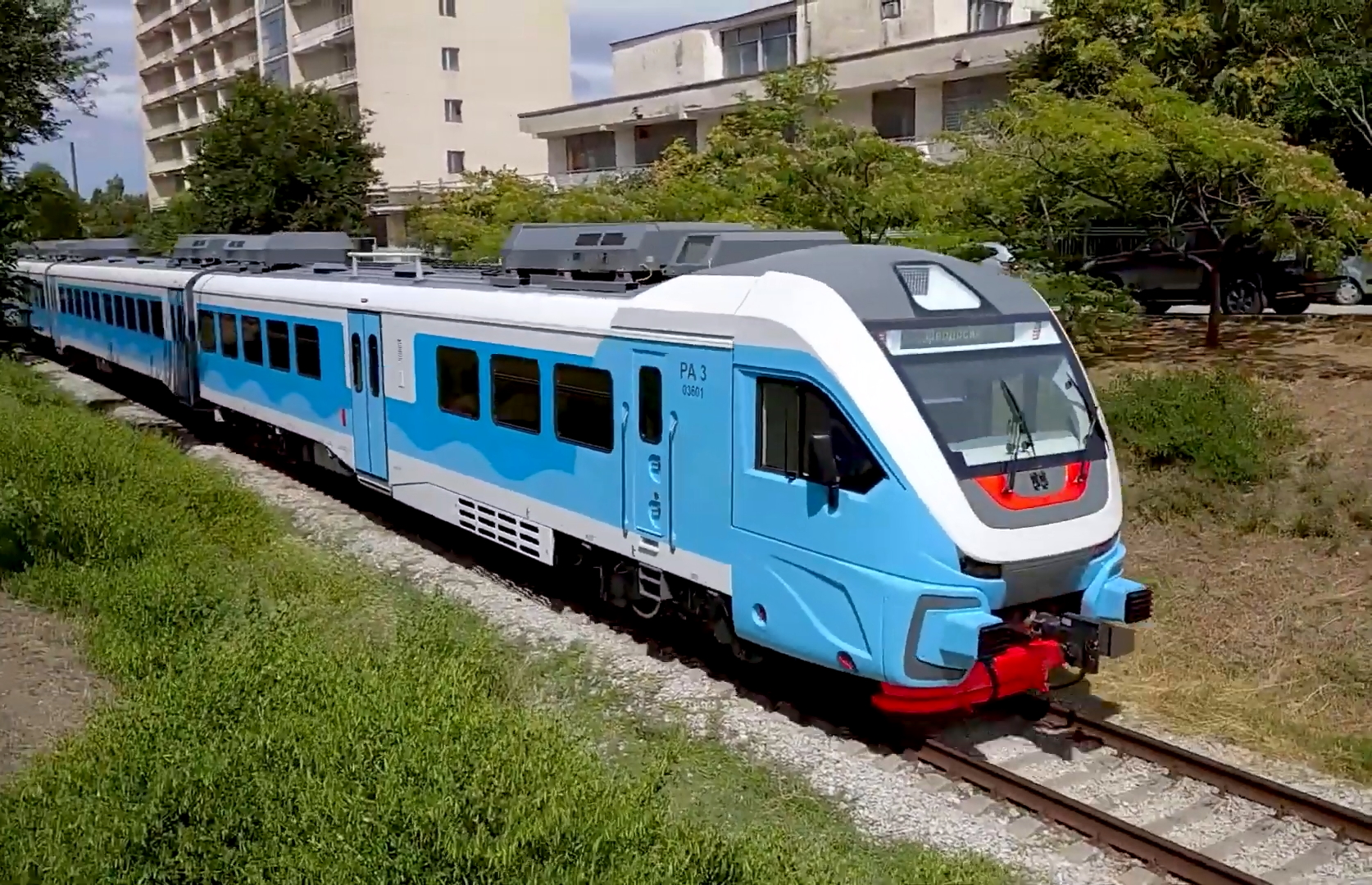
The 3 car RA3-036 in the YUPPK’s white and blue livery

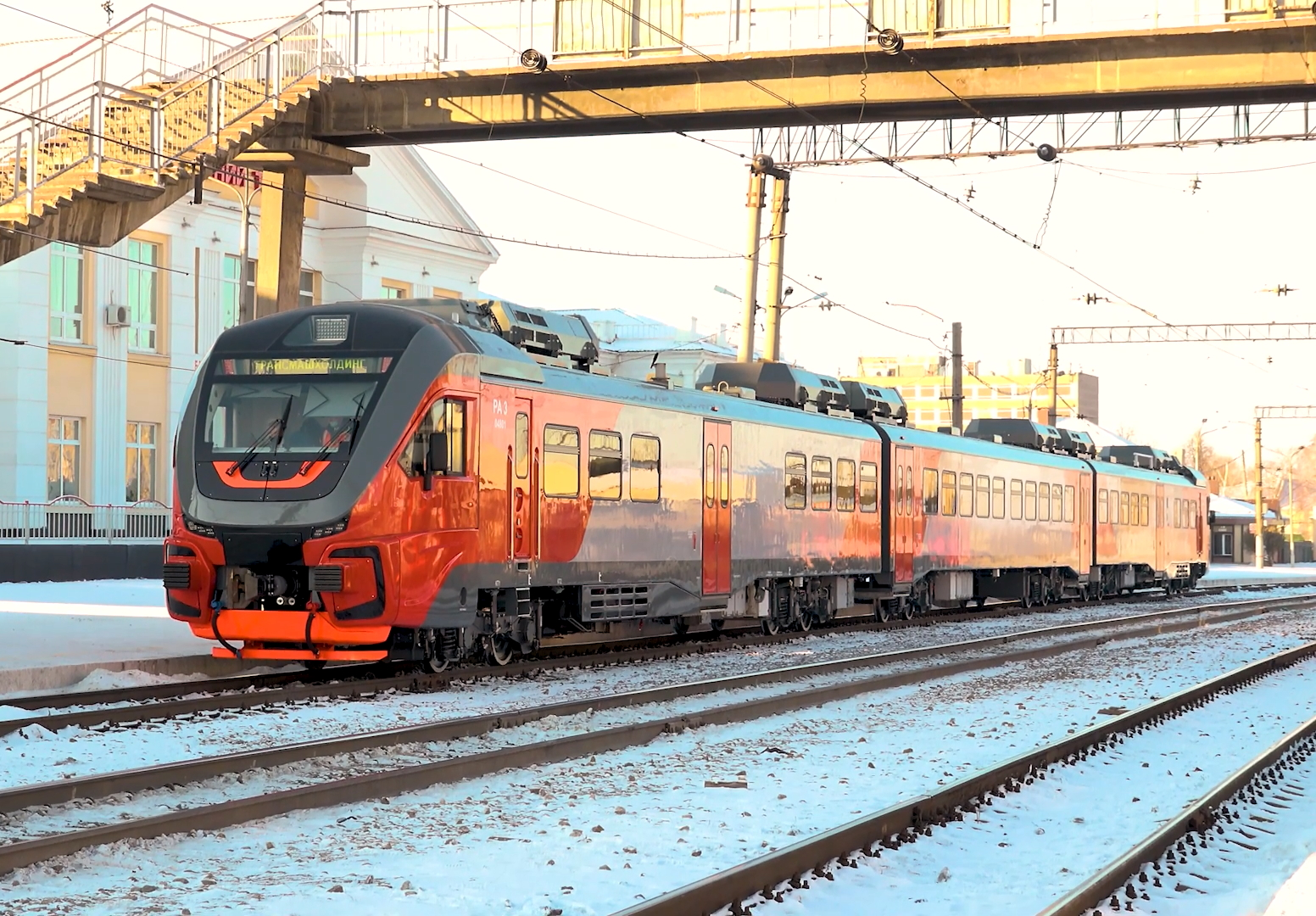
The 3 car RA3-048 in the Russian Railways’ red and grey livery

=== Perspectives for the project's development ===
In 2019, Transmashholding's Chief Executive Kirill Lipa announced plans to develop a multiple unit based on the RA3 model, which would be fitted with hydrogen fuel cells instead of a diesel engine. The work was to be carried out in collaboration with Alstom. The project was initially planned to be implemented on Sakhalin, with the delivery of 13 hydrogen powered multiple units. Russian Railways, the Rosatom State Corporation, Transmashholding and the Sakhalin Oblast administration were working on this project. As of February 2021, operational and financial models were prepared, and a feasibility study for the passenger transport project on Sakhalin was drawn up. By way of comparison, a conventional RA3 multiple unit requires around 900 tonnes of fuel per year and emits 67 tonnes of carbon dioxide into the atmosphere, whereas a hydrogen-powered train emits just 223.4 tonnes, producing distilled water instead of diesel exhaust. The first multiple unit was scheduled to be built by 2024, with 13 multiple units to be delivered by 2030.

== General characteristics ==
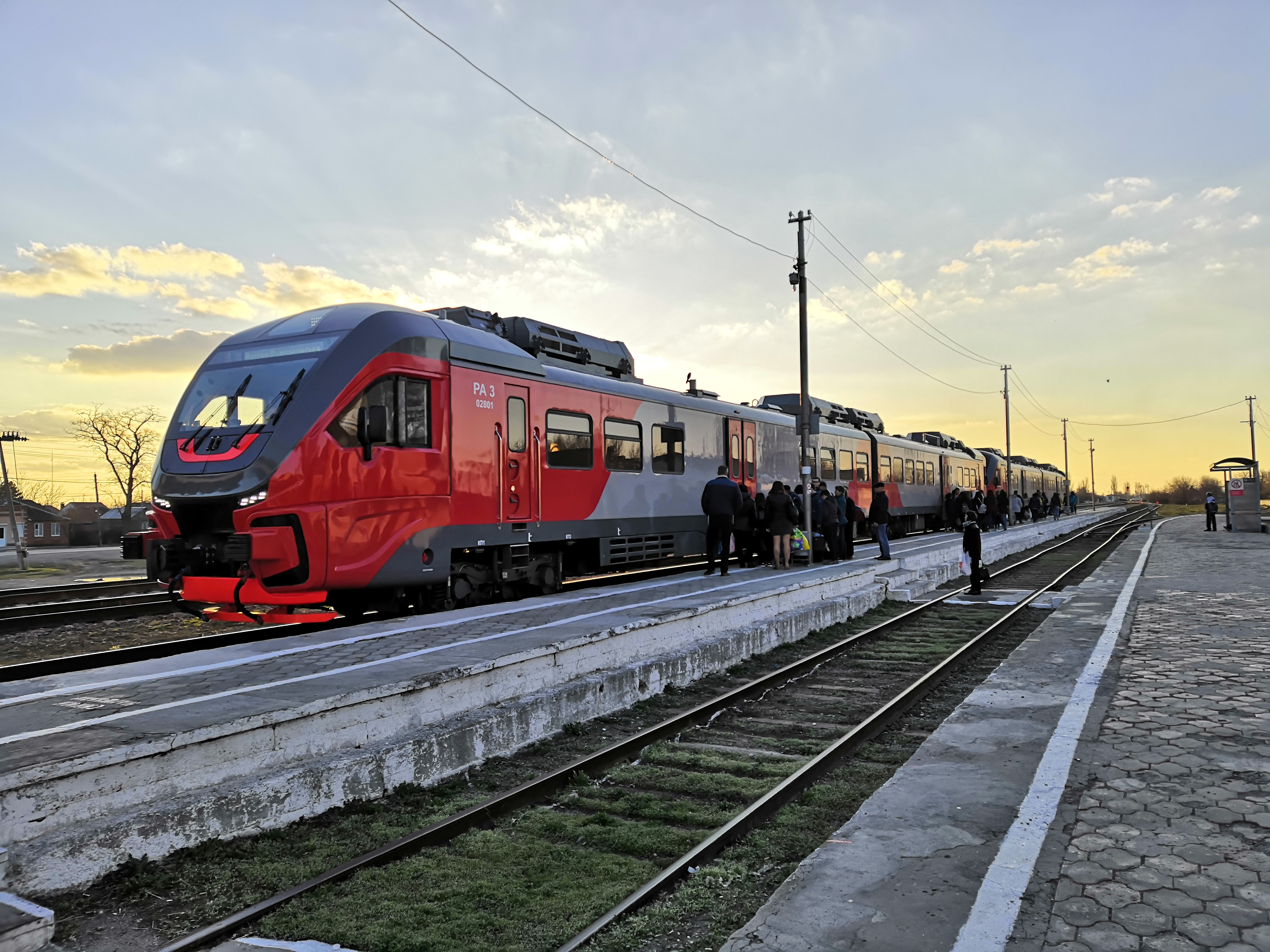
RA3-028 and RA3-027, coupled in an SME formation, departing from Zernograd railway station in Rostov Oblast, Russia

=== Main purpose ===
The RA3 was designed for suburban passenger services over distances of up to 200 km on non-electrified sections of Russian gauge railway lines equipped with both low and high platforms (Note: A high platform is a platform whose height above the track head is 1,100 mm. A medium platform is a platform whose height above the RHL is 550 mm. A low platform is a platform whose height above the RCL is no more than 200 mm). The recommended service life of the multiple unit is 40 years, with a total mileage of 4.8 million km.

=== Composition ===
Two types of cars were developed for the RA3 multiple unit: a motorised leading car (Mg (Мг)) and a trailing intermediate car (Pp (Пп)). The Mg car comes in two versions: a standard version without spaces for wheelchair users (model 753.10) and a version with a reduced number of seats, equipped with such spaces (model 753.11), whilst the Pp car is available only in the standard version (model 753.20).

The standard formation consists of three car (Mg+Pp+Mg). In addition, a single RA3 may consist of two leading cars (2Mg). A provision has been made for the operation of two multiple unitss (each with two and/or three cars) or three 2 car multiple units under the multiple-unit system (MUS); that is, the following train formations are also possible:

- 4 car, with a configuration of 2×2 Mg
- 5 car, with a configuration of (Mg+Pp+Mg)+2 Mg
- 6 car, with a configuration of 2×(Mg+Pp+Mg);
- 6 car, with a configuration of 3×(Mg+Mg).

=== Technical specifications ===
The key specifications of the RA3 diesel multiple units in 2 car (2Mg) and 3 car (Mg+Pp+Mg) formations, and of the cars:

Parameter		Car			Diesel multiple unit	
Parameter		753.10 (Mg)	753.11 (Mg)	753.20 (Pp)	2 car	3 car
Axle formula		B-2		2-2	(B-2)+(2-B)	(B-2)+(2-2)+(2-B)
Number of doors		2		4	4	8
Dimensions
Dimensions according to GOST 9238		1-BM				
Overall dimensions in milimetres	Length over couplers	23 780		?	47 560	?
Overall dimensions in milimetres	Body width	3140				
Overall dimensions in milimetres	Height above the rails	4690				
Overall dimensions in milimetres	Car pivot base	15 000		?	–	
Car body base height above the rails in milimetres	Along the bottom edge	1020				
Car body base height above the rails in milimetres	Across the floor of the passenger compartment	1300				
Coupler axis height in milimetres	Head	1060		–	1060	
Coupler axis height in milimetres	Between cars	930				
Chassis dimensions in milimetres	Bogie wheelbase	2150				
Chassis dimensions in milimetres	Wheel diameter	860–810 (Note: The values given are for new and fully worn wheels.)				
Chassis dimensions in milimetres	Track gauge	1520				
Chassis dimensions in milimetres	Distance between the inner surfaces of the wheels	1440				
Mass specifications
Net weight in tonnes		50.50	51	39.24	101.50	140.74
Maximum axle load on rails in tonnes		16				
Passenger capacity
Number of seats (Note: Depends on the interior configuration)	main features in the 3rd class saloon	73	60 (62)	96	133 (135)	229
Number of seats	main features in the 2nd class saloon	42	36	56	78	134
Number of seats	reclining (o) or semi-seated (p)	2o/2p	3o/2p	–	5o/4p	
Number of wheelchair spaces		–	2	–	2	
Capacity for standing passengers in 3rd class	at a design occupancy rate (3 people/m²) (Note: According to the standard currently in force in Russia, the design capacity for railbuses is defined as a standing passenger density of 3 people/m², whilst the maximum capacity is 7 people/m². The calculations in official sources are based on the assumption that all seats, except for folding seats, are occupied, and that the wheelchair spaces are not occupied by standing passengers.)	48	50 (Note: According to official sources, the capacity of a car model 753.11 is lower than that of a car model 753.10, which has a greater number of seats. This is only true provided that the area designated for disabled passengers is not occupied by standing passengers.)	63	98	161
Capacity for standing passengers in 3rd class	at maximum occupancy (7 people/m²)	112	117	148	229	377
Total capacity in 3rd class	at an estimated occupancy rate	121	110	159	231	390
Total capacity in 3rd class	at a maximum capacity	185	177	244	362	606
Traction and power characteristics
Speed in kilometre per hour	Design	120				
Speed in kilometre per hour	Operational	120				
Average acceleration to 60 km/h in m/s²		0,37		–	0,37	0,37
Diesel engine power output in kilowatts		360 (≈490) (Note: Depends on operating conditions)		–	2×360=720 (≈2×490=980)	
Specific fuel consumption in a diesel engine in grams per kilowatt-hour	at rated power	210–218		–	210–218	
Specific fuel consumption in a diesel engine in grams per kilowatt-hour	at optimum power (60% of rated power)	198–200		–	198–200	
Fuel consumption of the diesel engine in litre per hour	at rated power	91.1–94.6		–	182.2–189.2	
Fuel consumption of the diesel engine in litre per hour	at optimum power (60% of rated power)	51.6–52.1		–	103.2–104.2	
Fuel consumption of the diesel engine in litre per hour	at idle	2.30		–	4.60	
RPM of the diesel engine shaft	nominal	1800		–	1800	
RPM of the diesel engine shaft	idling minimum	800		–	800	
Maximum torque in Newton-metres	at the diesel engine’s output (at 1,300 rpm)	2200		–	2200	
Maximum torque in Newton-metres	at the output of the hydraulic transmission	6000		–	600	
Cylinder dimensions of a diesel engine	Cylinder diameter in milimetres	128		–	128	
Cylinder dimensions of a diesel engine	Piston stroke in milimetres	166		–	166	
Cylinder dimensions of a diesel engine	Working capacity in litres	6 × 2,14 = 12,84		–	12 × 2,14 = 25,68	
Specifications of the on-board generator	Voltage output in Volts	~400		–	~400	
Specifications of the on-board generator	Output voltage frequency (rotor speed) in Hz	50		–	50	
Specifications of the on-board generator	Rated current in amperes	~101		–	~101	
Specifications of the on-board generator	Maximum power in kilovolts per ampere	70		–	2×70=140	
Braking distance under the full load in metres	at a speed of 100 km/h	651		–	651	?
Braking distance under the full load in metres	at a speed of 120 km/h	716		–	716	?
Equipment
Fuel capacity in litres		700		–	2×700=1400	
Oil capacity in litres	Diesel engine	48		–	2×48=96	
Oil capacity in litres	in the hydrostatic system of the auxiliary drive	60		–	2×60=120	
Oil capacity in litres	hydraulic transmission (without heat exchanger and pipework)	75		–	2×75=150	
Oil capacity in litres	hydraulic transmission (with heat exchanger and pipework)	95		–	2×95=190	
Coolant capacity in litres	diesel engine (excluding the coolant)	17		–	2×17=34	
Coolant capacity in litres	diesel engine (with intercooler)	60		–	2×60=120	
Coolant capacity in litres	in the liquid-air heating system for the driver’s cab and passenger compartment	120		–	2×120=240	
Sand capacity in kilograms		40		–	2×40=80	

=== Numbering and labeling ===
The multiple units are designated with 3-digit serial numbers, starting with 001. Each car in a multiple unit is designated in its own 5-digit number, where the first three digits are the multiple unit’s serial number and the last two are the car’s number within the multiple unit (01 and 02 are the leading cars; 03 is the intermediate car, if present). For example, the cars of the multiple unit RA3-018 (the first of the 3-car multiple units) were numbered 01801, 01802 (leading cars) and 01803 (intermediate car).

The designation indicating the class type and number is located on the side of the carriages at window level — on the leading cars, it is located between the side window of the driver’s cab and the door to the driver’s service vestibule, and on the intermediate cars, between the two middle windows. The designation consists of two lines: the top line indicates the multiple unit class (followed by a space: RA 3), whilst the bottom line shows the 5-digit car number (written as a single word).

A manufacturer’s plate may be located beneath the class type and number markings on the leading cars. It contains the following information:

- The manufacturer's logo
- Name of the manufacturer ("Metrovagonmash JSC", Russian: „АО «Метровагонмаш»“)
- The product name and code ("RA-3 rail bus", Russian: «Рельсовый автобус РА-3»’; the code is given with a hyphen), sometimes a serial number
- The drawing reference (e.g. 753.00.00.00.000 or 753.00.00.00.000-02)
- The value of the design speed
- The date (day, month, year) on which production was completed.

The markings indicating the design speed and net weight of the cars are also applied to the sides of the cars, whilst the number of seats is indicated near the passenger entrance doors. Only the number of standard seats is taken into account, excluding semi-seats or folding seats. For example, on the leading cars of models 753.10 and 753.11 in 3rd class configuration, its number of seats is stated as 73 and 60, excluding the two or three folding seats in them (the total number of seats is 75 and 63).

Additionally, the owner’s and/or rolling stock operator’s logo may be displayed on the cars.

Markings on railway carriages (using RA3-002 as an example)

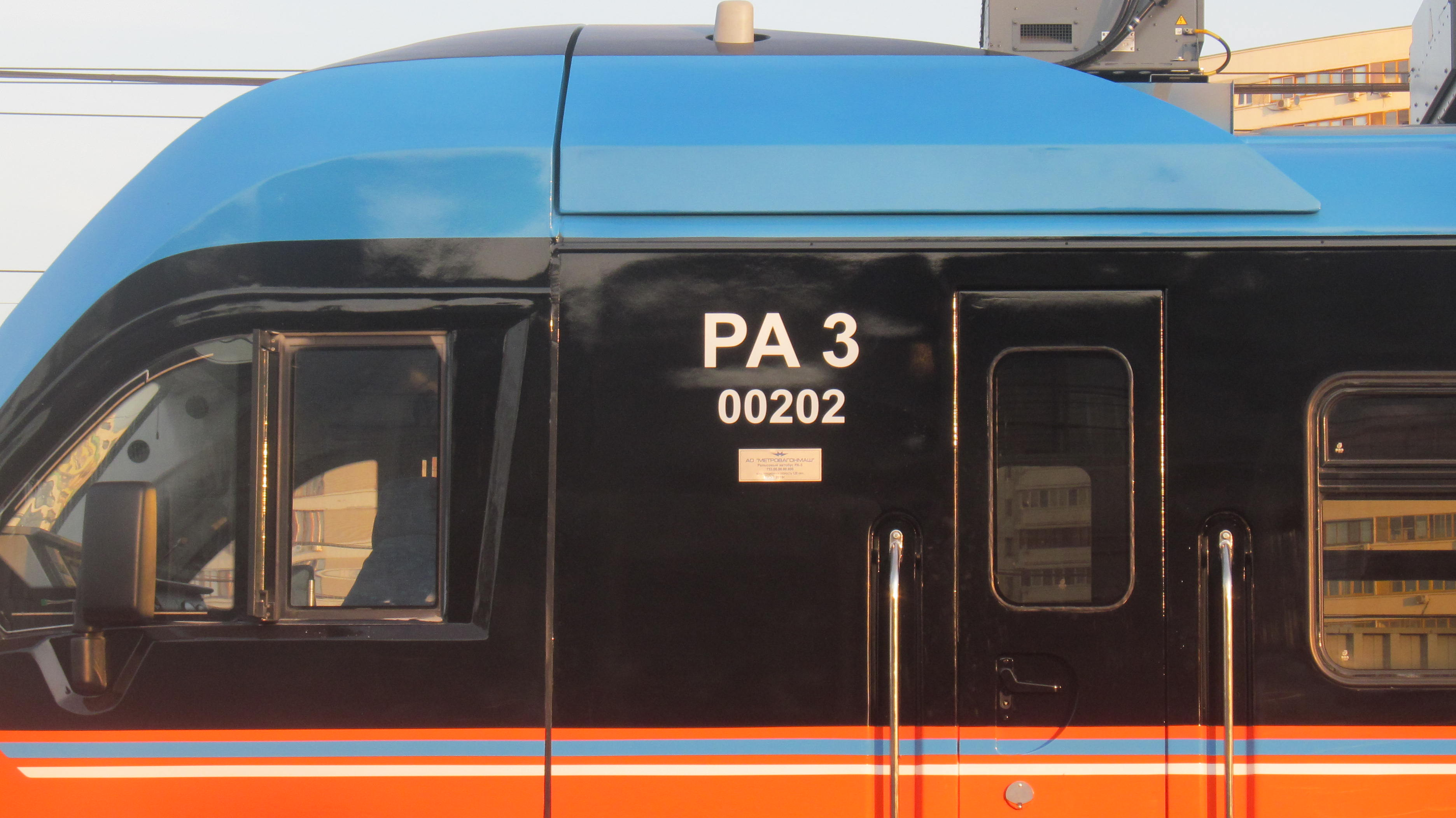
Designation on the first car RA3-00202

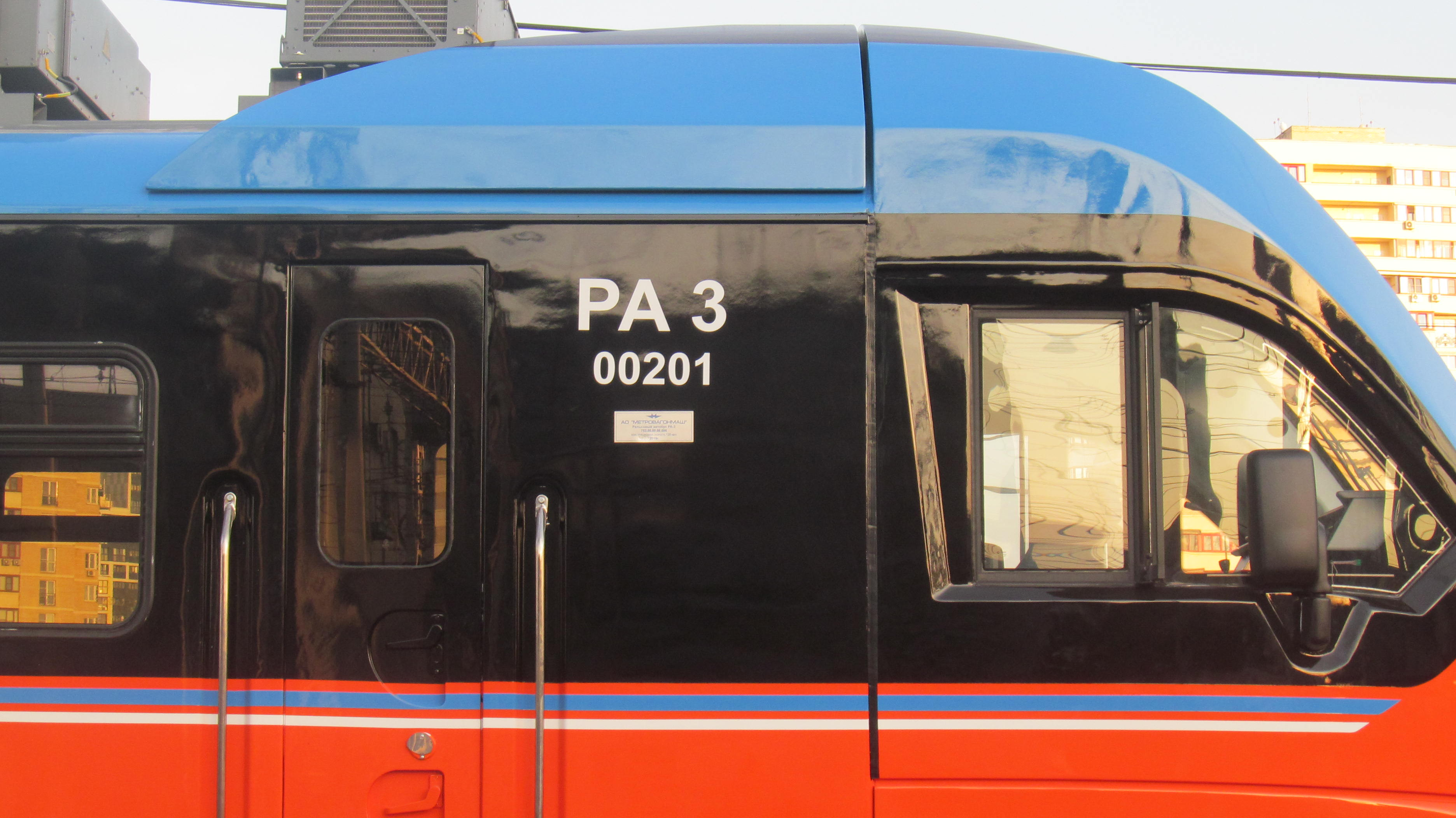
Designation on the second car RA3-00201

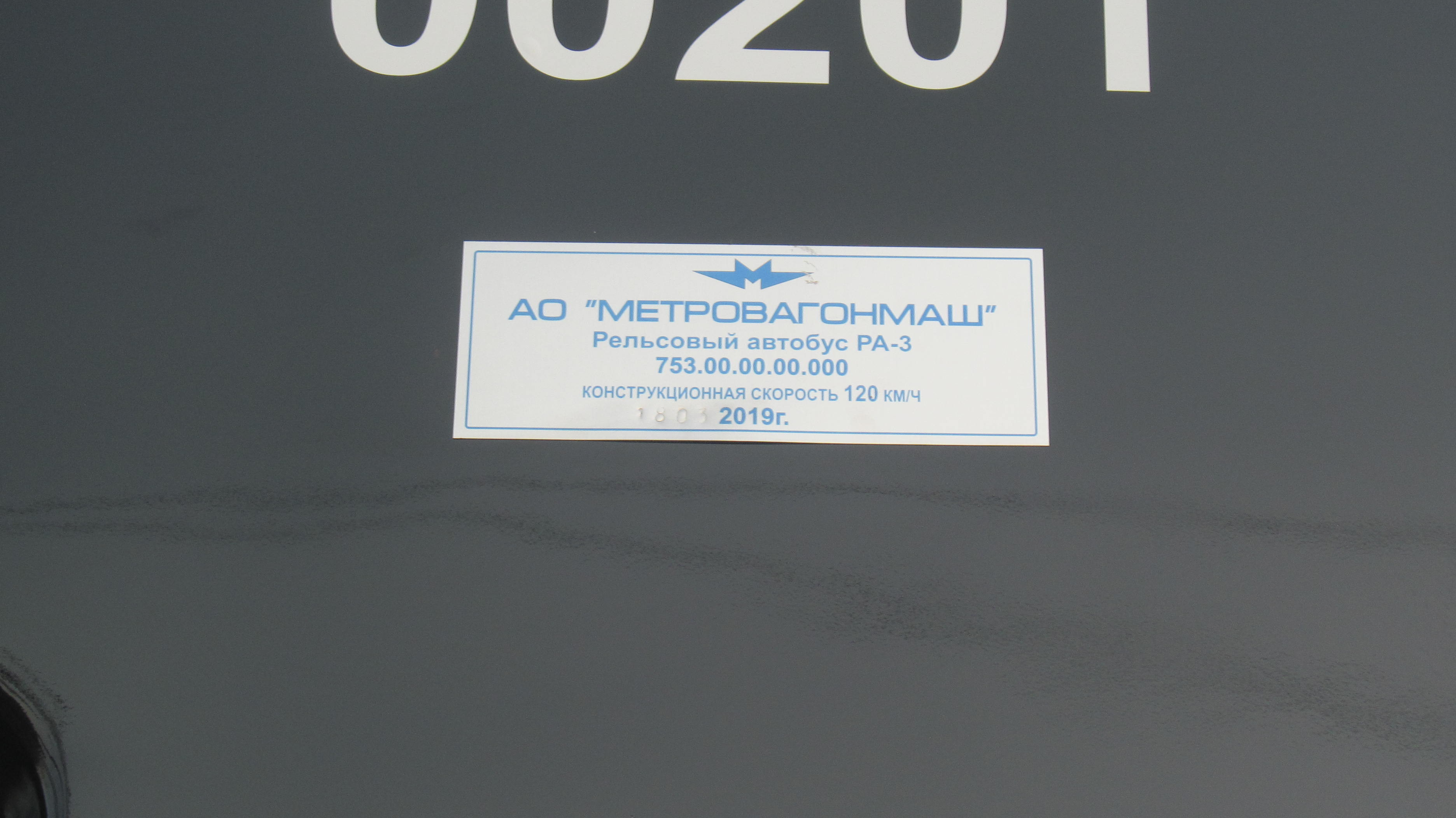
Manufacturer's plate

== Design ==
=== Mechanical components ===
External videos
- РА3-001 на испытаниях (внешний обзор)

The mechanical (underframe) section of each car consists of a body and two 2-axle bogies. The body rests on the bogies via air springs and is connected to them by longitudinal links. The bogie on the driver’s cab side of each motor car is the driving bogie (driven by the traction unit), whilst the other is a trailing bogie; the car’s wheel arrangement is 2_{0}-2 (corresponding to the B’2’ arrangement in the UIC format) (Note: Unlike the UIC system, the Soviet system’s axle formula does not take into account the presence or absence of a drive between the axles in the bogie.). Both bogies of the trailer car are non-traction; the car’s wheel arrangement is 2-2 (corresponding to the 2’2’ arrangement in the UIC format).

RA3 cars

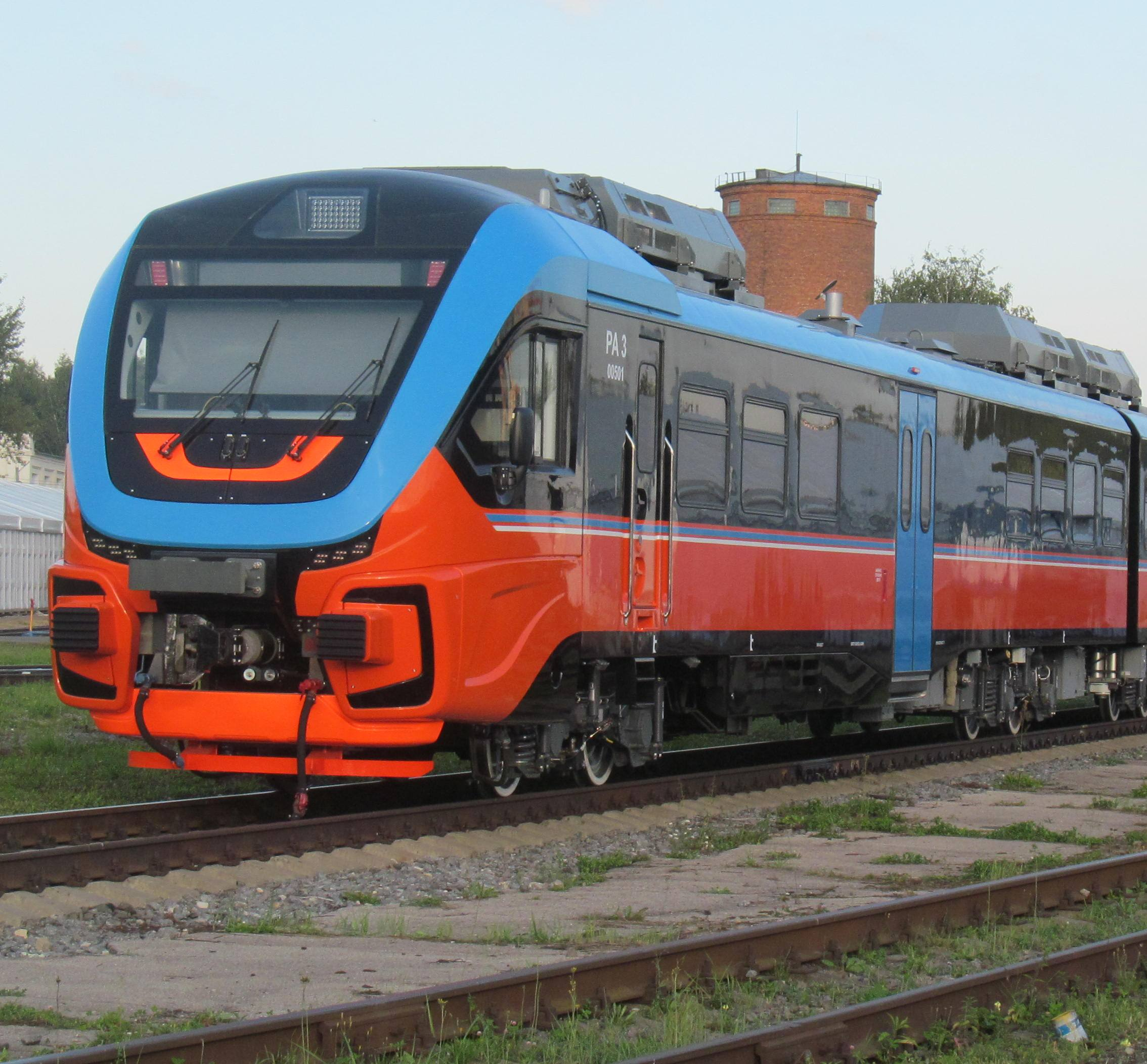
RA3-005. RA3-00501 motor car (view from the port side)

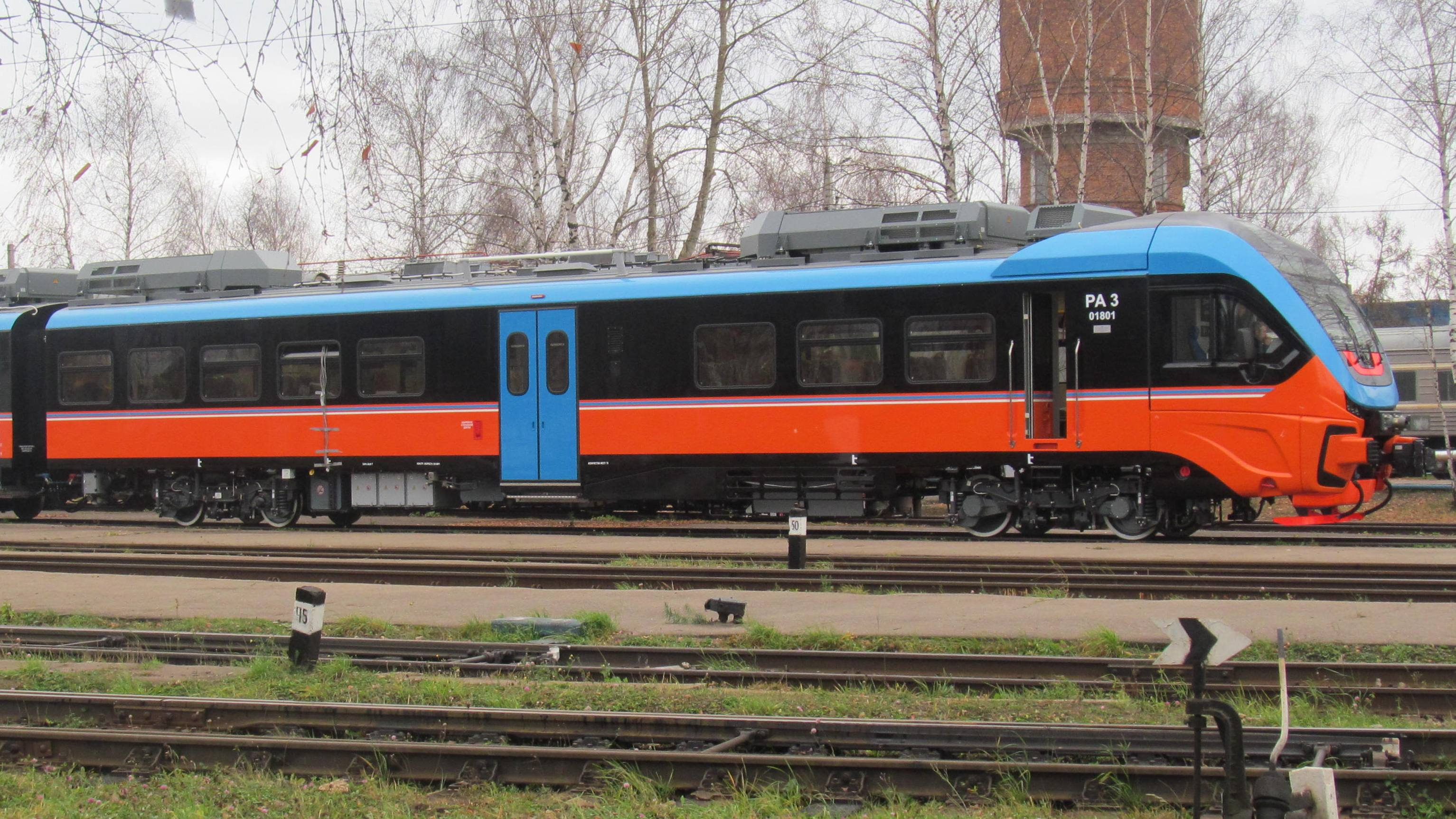
RA3-018. RA3-01801 motor end car (view from the starboard side)

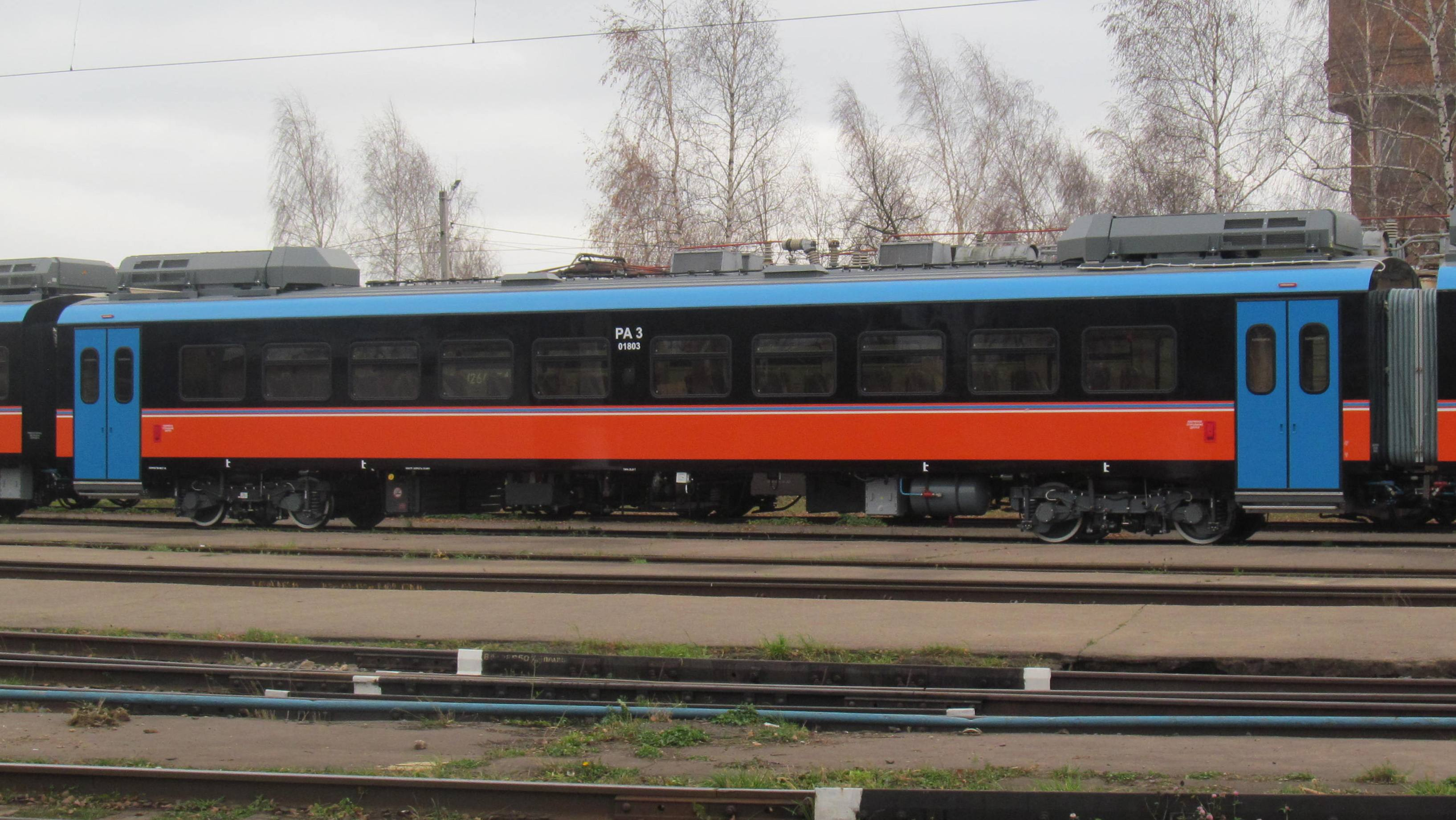
RA3-018. RA3-01803 trailer intermediate car

==== Bodywork ====
The car bodies are all-metal, welded, load-bearing structures made of stainless steel. The leading car has a single driver’s cab located at the front. The driver’s cab has a metal frame covered on the outside with fiberglass cladding. The body of each car consists of a main frame with a floor deck, two side walls, the cab’s front panel and an end wall at the leading end or two end walls on intermediate cars, a roof, and internal partitions separating the vestibules from the passenger compartment or the cab.

The body frame is the main load-bearing element and has a closed structure, welded from channel-shaped beams made of low-alloy steel. The outer contour of the leading car’s frame is formed by two longitudinal side members on either side, an end beam at the rear end and two buffer beams on the cab side, whilst the contour of the intermediate car’s frame consists of two side members and two end beams. The front buffers are attached to the buffer beams. A set of thin transverse beams is arranged between the intermediate beams along the entire length, but two wide transverse kingpin beams are positioned above the centres of the bogies, serving to support the body on the bogies. A group of longitudinal beams runs between the centres of the pivot beams, whilst wide ridge beams extend from the centre of each pivot beam to the centre of the end beam or to the start of the gap between the buffer beams; couplers are attached to the ends of these ridge beams. The side members have gaps in the area where the passenger vestibule staircases are located, bounded by transverse beams, and are laid behind the staircases with a narrower spacing. The top of the frame is covered with a deck of corrugated steel sheets with cut-out hatches for access to the power unit from the passenger compartment. The power unit, pneumatic and electrical equipment are mounted on the underside of the frame.

The side walls of the body are flat and vertical and consist of a welded frame comprising upper and lower stringers, window frames and vertical door pillars, clad on the outside with smooth steel sheets. Each leading car has one crew vestibule at the front of the body behind the driver’s cab and one passenger vestibule in the middle of the car; intermediate cars have two passenger vestibules (one at each end of the carriage). At the front of the end walls of the leading car, between the crew vestibule and the passenger vestibule, there are three passenger compartment windows on each side towards the rear, followed by a windowless section, whilst at the rear, moving from the end wall towards the vestibule, there are five windows on the right-hand side with a small gap in front of the vestibule, and four on the left-hand side with a long gap (the first window on the left, on the vestibule side, is absent due to the toilet compartment). The intermediate car has 10 windows on each side.

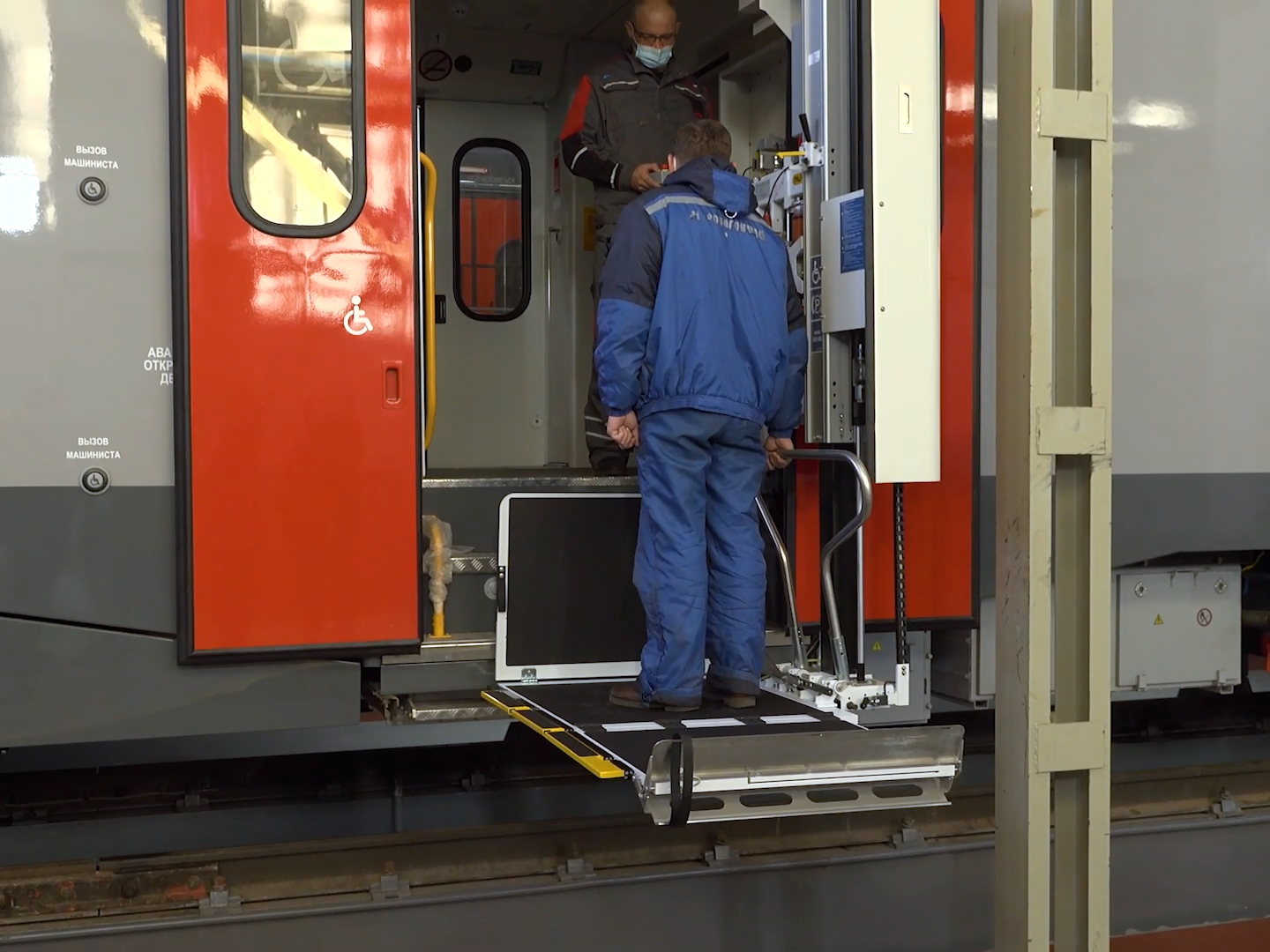
The entrance doors to the passenger vestibule of the leading carriage, shown open, and a wheelchair lift

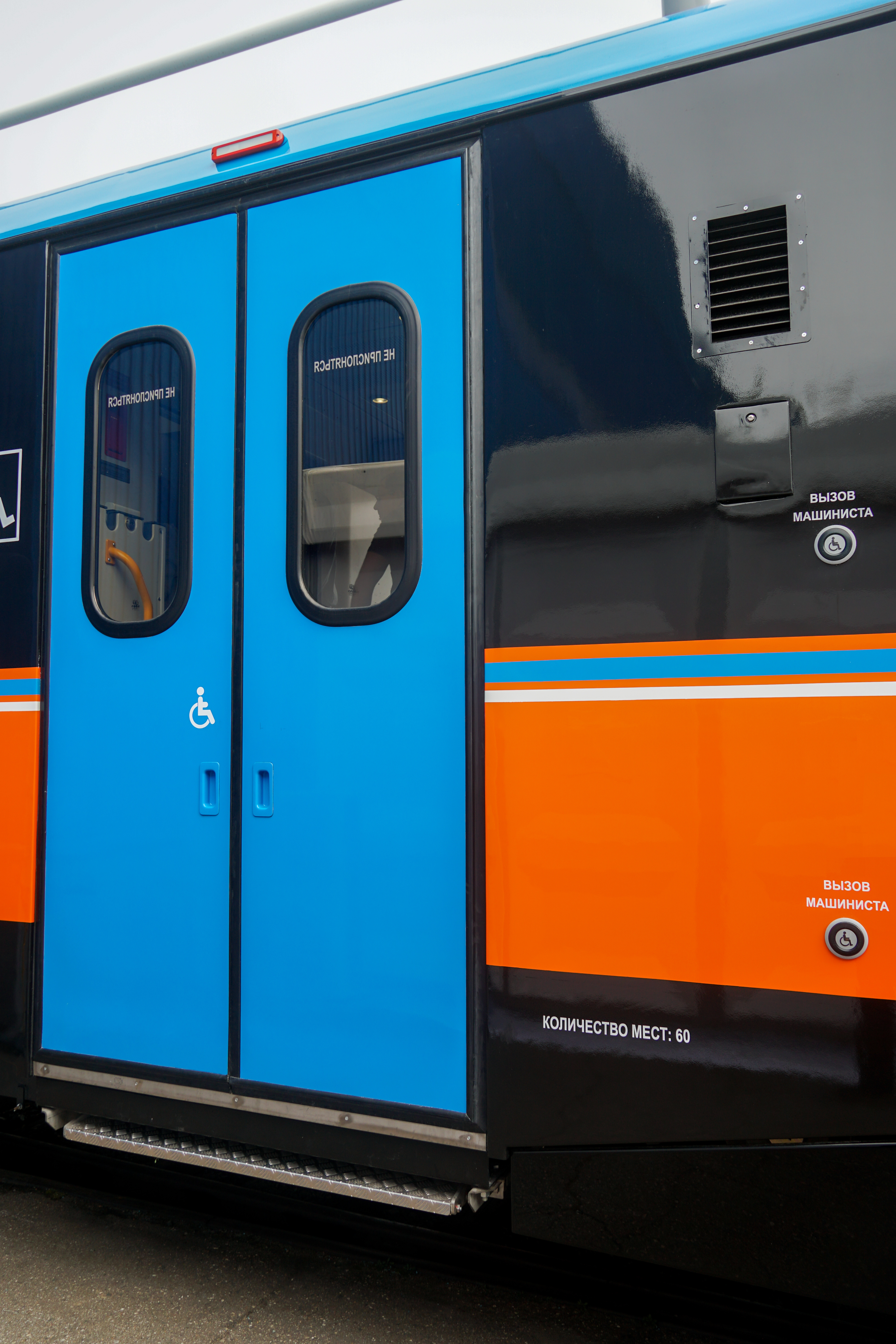
RA3-005. Entrance doors to the passenger vestibule of the leading car. To the right of the doors are the buttons for calling the assistant driver and the diesel engine’s air intake

The passenger vestibules on both sides of the car, used for boarding and alighting, are fitted with double-leaf sliding doors equipped with an electric drive and an anti-pinch system. Each leaf has an oval window. The doors are controlled centrally from the driver’s cab. Above the outer doors of the passenger vestibule is an external indicator in the form of a red lamp that flashes when the doors are opened and closed, and to the side of them is an external emergency opening device for the passenger doors. To enable passengers on board and alight at stations with low platforms, the vestibules are fitted with electrically operated retractable steps, which are also controlled from the driver’s cab. On the 753.11 model car, a special lift with a platform folds out from the vestibule to the outside to allow passengers in wheelchairs to board and alight; the retractable step is retracted at the same time. On the 753.11 model car, buttons for calling the locomotive crew are located to the side of the entrance doors on the cab side, in case assistance is required for a disabled passenger when boarding; these are positioned at two levels to correspond to the height of the platform. The call buttons are from the 57 series manufactured by the Swiss company EAO AG. On the starboard side of each leading car, to the right of the doors, an air intake for the diesel engine’s intake duct is built into the side wall. At the front of the leading car, false sides with oval cut-outs are situated at the bottom on either side, covering the power unit.

The crew compartment, situated in the main body of the multiple unit behind the driver’s cab, has one single-leaf door with a window on each side, fitted with handles on two levels. Vertical handrails are fitted to either side of the door, and steps are provided beneath it to allow access to this compartment from the low platform. The side walls of the driver’s cab taper smoothly towards the front relative to the width of the body. On either side of the driver’s cab there is a single window opening, consisting of a fixed front section with an arched top and a sliding rear section. The rear-view mirrors are fitted in front of the windows; which are electrically adjustable and electrically heated. Below the windows, there are decorative side overhangs on the front end, which protrude across the width relative to the tapering upper section.

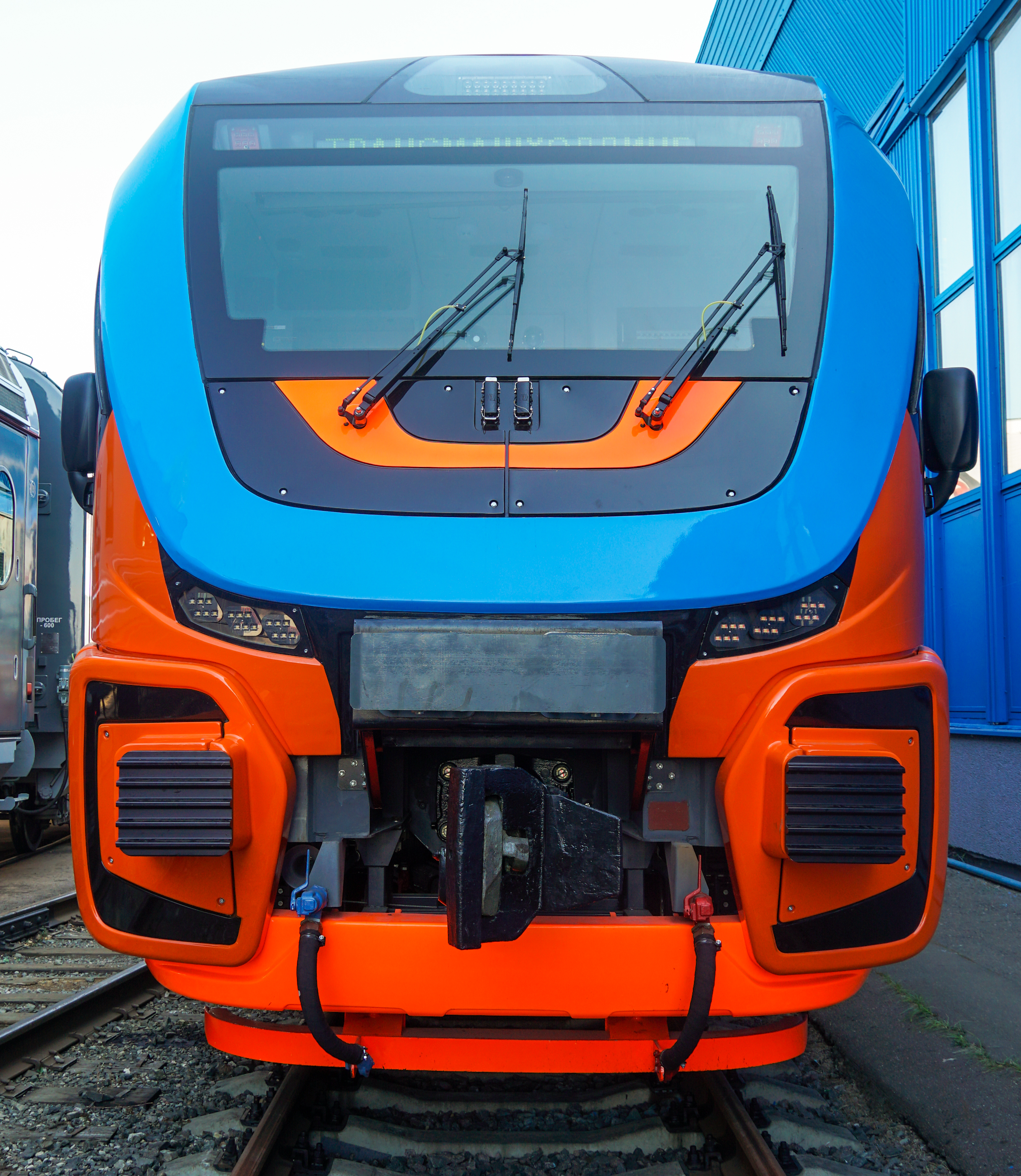
RA3-005. An oblique view of the front part of the cab from the front. A central buffer is fitted above the coupler.

The front section of the driver’s cab has a streamlined shape with rounded corners and rectangular cut-outs at the bottom to accommodate the automatic coupler and two crash buffers. The upper section of the driver’s cab’s front end is angled backwards and merges smoothly into the roof. It is separated from the lower section of the front end and the cab’s side walls by a U-shaped contour with corner panels that merge smoothly into the side slopes of the roof above the cab. Just below the curves of the contour, at a slight angle, are the left and right blocks of headlights with flanges at the upper outer corners; each block has three lights, each containing six LED lamps emitting white and red light. At the top of the windscreen (behind it) are the left and right upper red signal headlights. Between them is the route display. Above the windscreen, in the centre, is a spotlight recessed into the bodywork, consisting of 9×5 LED lamps. The headlamp’s protective lens is trapezoidal in shape (the light-emitting matrix is rectangular). The cab glazing was manufactured by JSC "Obninsk Scientific and Production Enterprise “Technologia” named after A. G. Romashin"; the same company also manufactured the headlamp lenses and the rear position headlights. Two electric windscreen wipers with washers are fitted beneath the windscreen; the wipers have a parking position on the port side. Centred between them are two electrical connectors for connecting cables when the train is operated in a multiple-unit formation.

To couple the RA3 to other rolling stock (a locomotive, another RA3, and so on), the leading cars on the cab side are fitted with SA-3 automatic couplers, around which there is a rectangular cut-out. To connect cars at the inter-car gangways, gap-free inter-car couplers are fitted. Both of the automatic couplers and the inter-car couplers are fitted with energy-absorbing devices that absorb the energy of longitudinal impacts during coupling and whilst the train is in motion. A removable central buffer may be fitted above the front automatic coupler at the level of the buffer lights; this serves to absorb longitudinal impact forces between the leading cars when coupling trains in multiple-unit formations, which arise due to gaps between the surfaces of adjacent automatic couplers. On most trains operating in single-unit mode, a decorative cover is fitted in its place. Flanking the automatic coupler are side crash buffers, around which decorative overhangs are fitted. At the lower part of the cab, beneath the cut-out for the automatic coupler, the front overhang of the front end is fitted, and further down behind it is a cowcatcher, secured to the car frame from below via a special bracket.

The cars are fitted with an emergency crash system comprising three types of energy-absorbing devices (EADs):

- side crash buffers, located at the front on either side of the Mg car coupler;
- tubular deformation blocks for locomotive couplers;
- tubular deformation blocks for inter-car coupling devices.

All of the above-mentioned UPE units are non-repairable replaceable units.

RA3 coupling and buffer devices

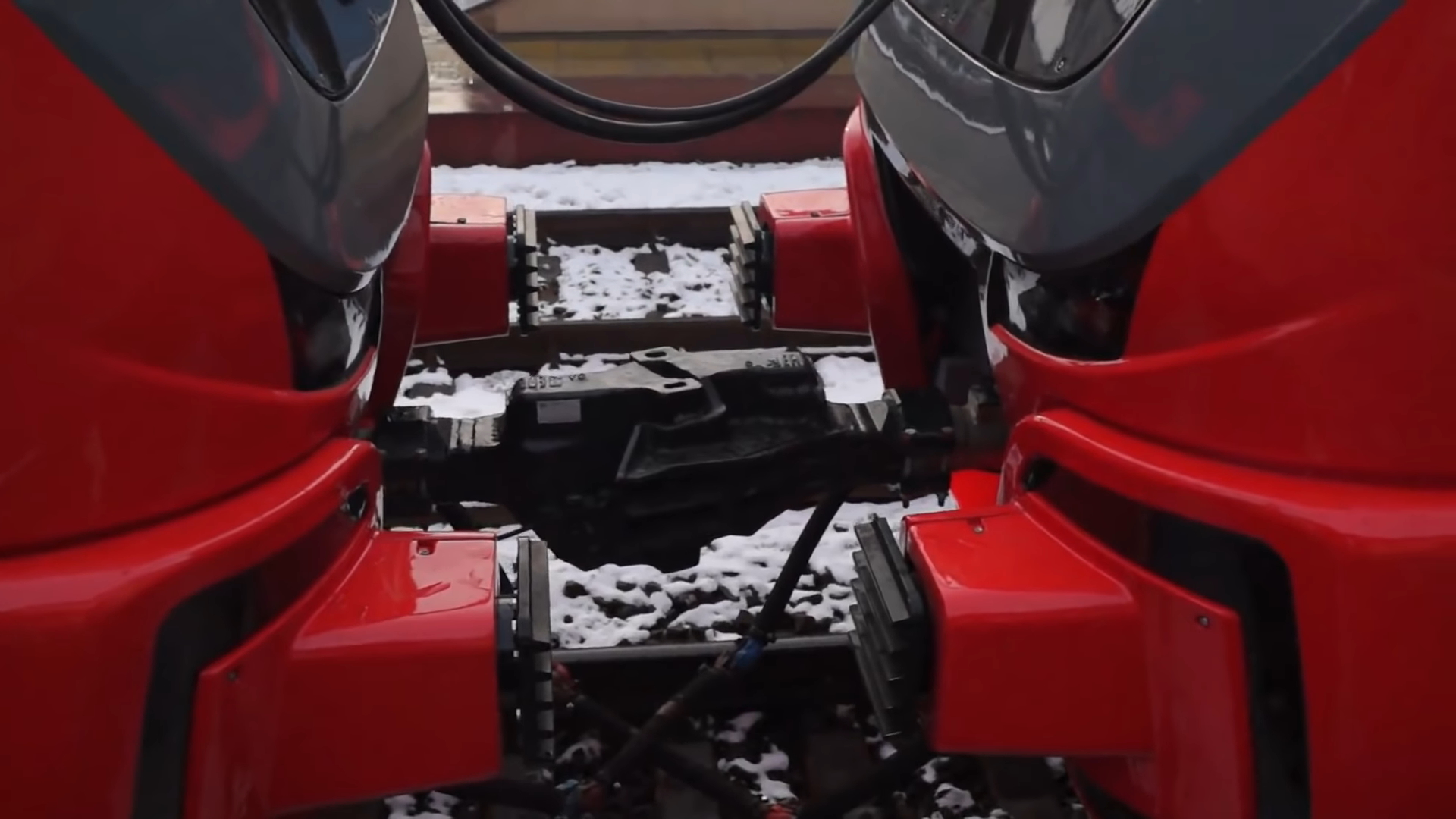
Coupling of RA3 leading cars using the multi-unit system

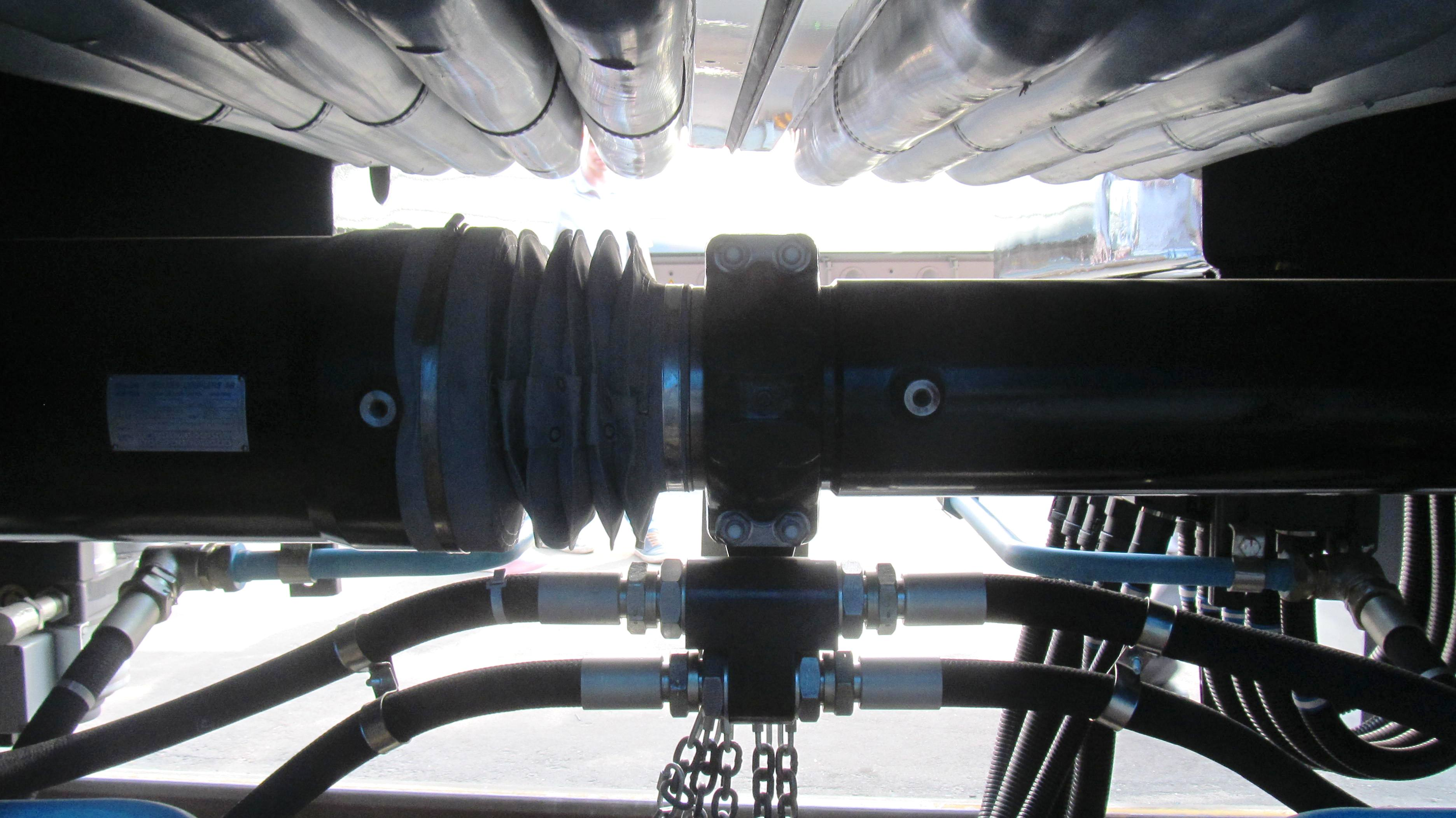
Dellner 8550 inter-car coupling (drawing no. 1099640) on RA3-005

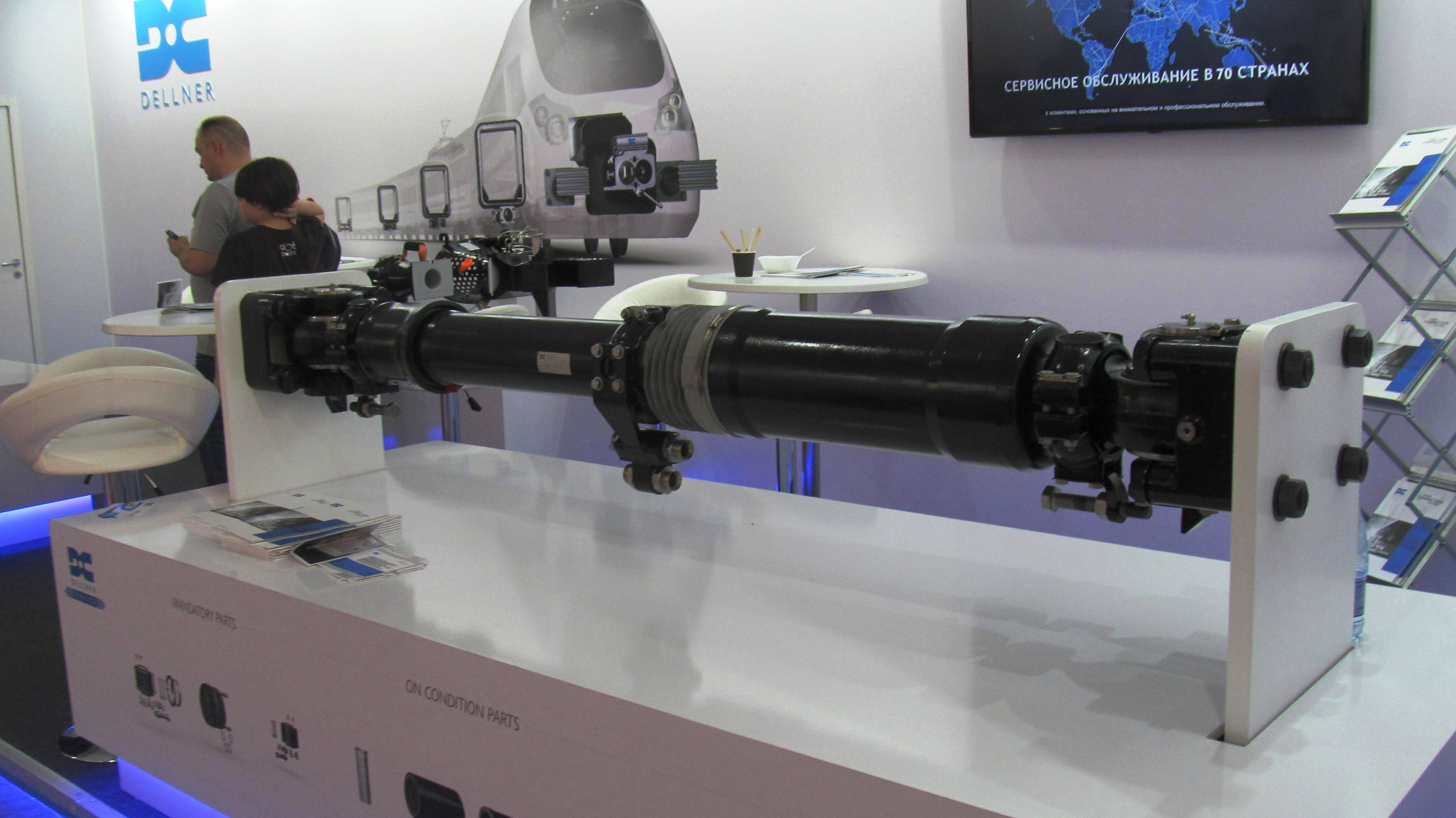
A Dellner inter-car coupling on display at the ‘PRO//Dvizhenie.Expo’ exhibition, 2019

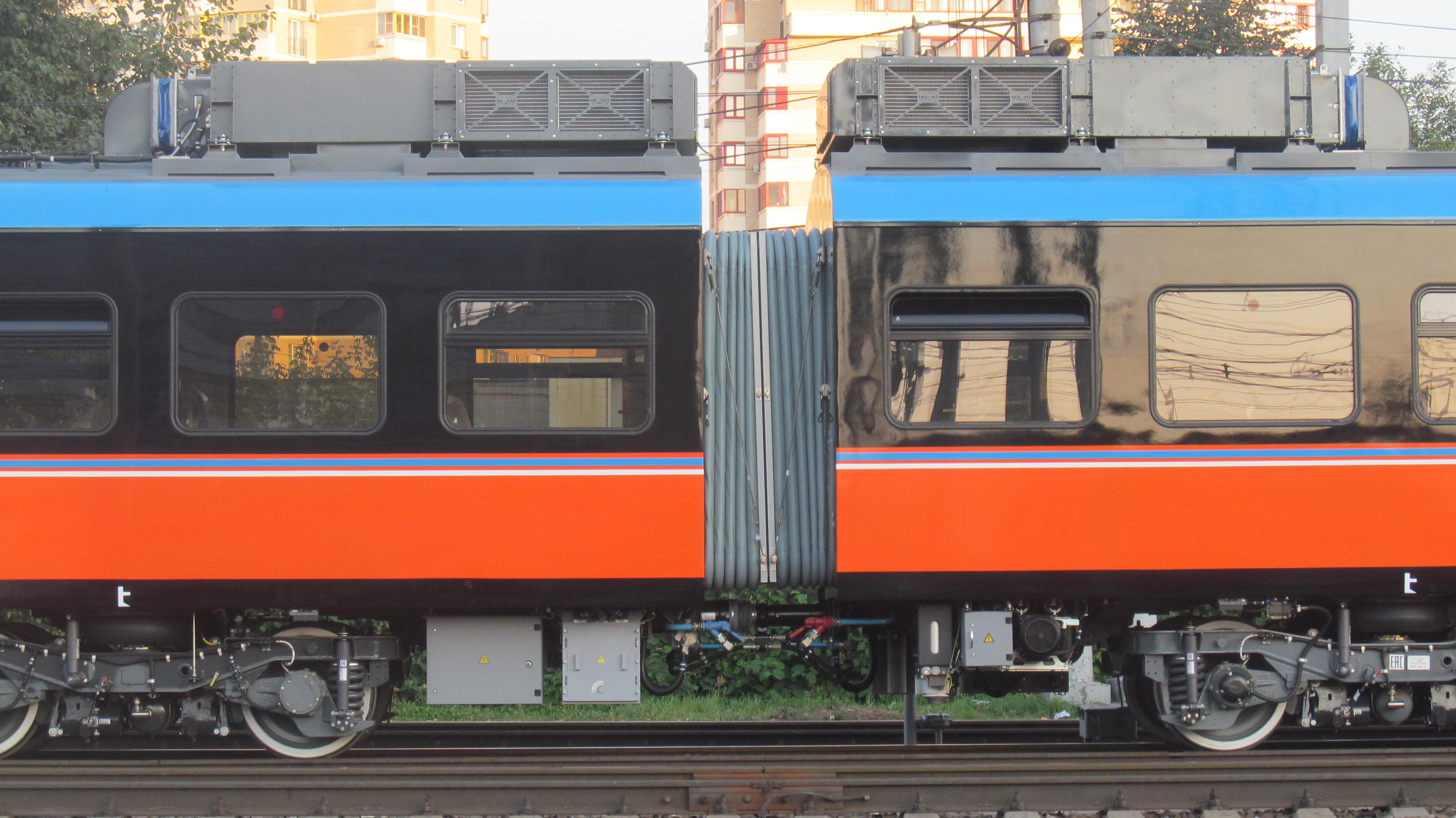
RA3-002. Air-conditioning units (on roofs) and inter-car gangway

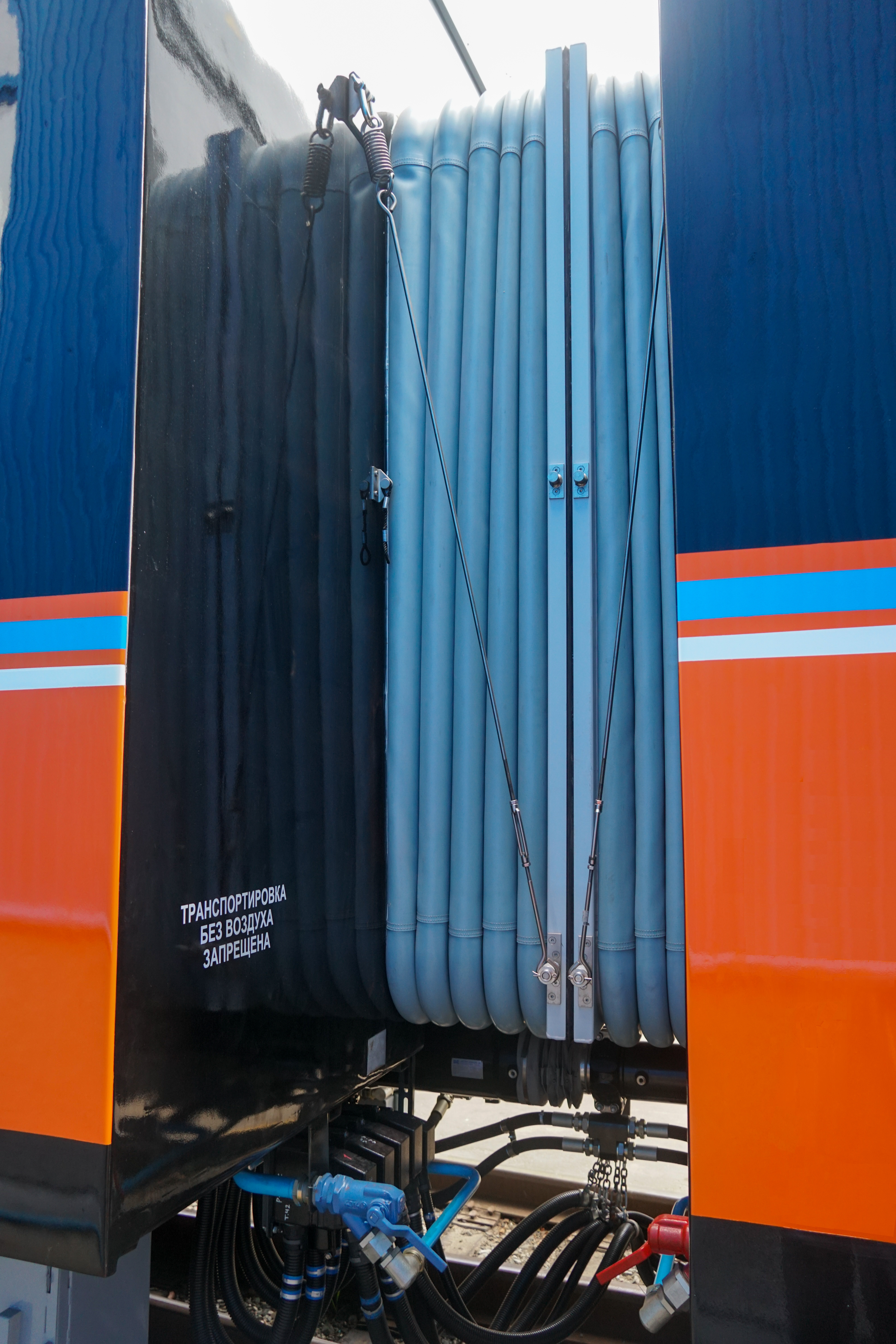
RA3-005. Close-up view of the inter-car gangway

The intermediate end walls consist of a welded frame made up of vertical posts, cross-members and load-bearing beams, clad with smooth sheets. To allow passage from one car to another within the train, each end section without a driver’s cab (one on the Mg car and both on the Pp car) is fitted with half of a closed-type inter-car passage in the form of a corrugated bellows made of flexible material ("accordion") manufactured by Hubner, and a single-leaf swing door in the central aisle.

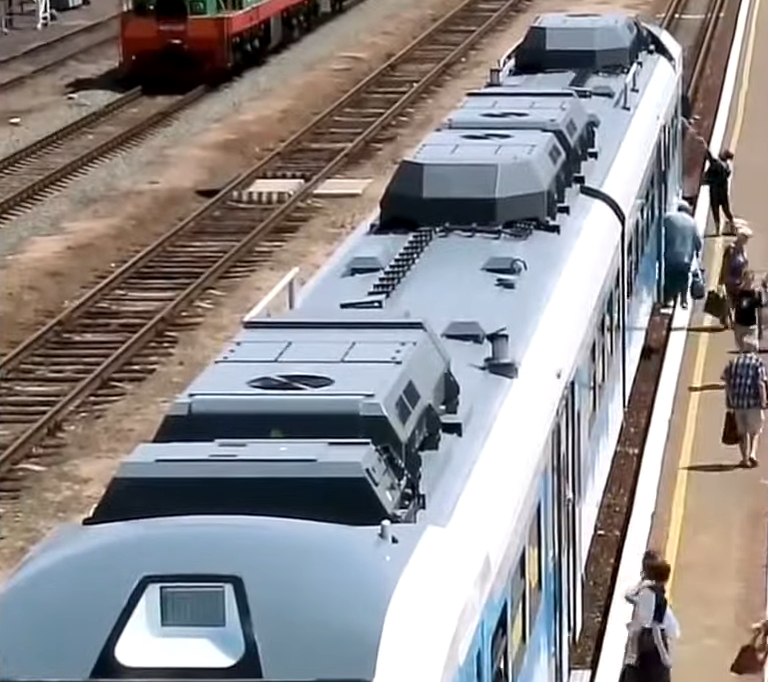
The roof of the 2 car RA3 multiple units

The roofs of the cars have a metal framework at their base, consisting of transverse arches and uprights, longitudinal side beams and two longitudinal girders resting on the side walls. On the outside, the roof is clad with corrugated steel sheets featuring longitudinal corrugations. The sloping side sections of the roof are made of smooth sheets. The roof above the driver’s cab on the leading car is smooth and is raised above the roof and slopes of the main body. Above the service vestibule, there is an aerodynamic fairing with an arched cut-out for the cab’s air conditioning unit in the center, which continues at the same level as the cab roof and then gradually slopes downwards at the corners. The following equipment is mounted on the roof of the leading car: three aerials, a small air-conditioning unit for the driver’s cab above the service vestibule, and two large air-conditioning units for the passenger compartment above the areas of the first three and last three windows of the compartment, an exhaust pipe (on the left-hand side in front of the vestibule), two pressure relief valve covers (above the passenger vestibule and the rear passenger compartment), a ventilation cover for the toilet block, and the outlet pipe for the toilet block’s ejector. Two identical passenger compartment air-conditioning units (next to the ends) and two pressure relief valve covers (next to the centre of the passenger compartment) are mounted on the roof of the intermediate car.

==== Bogies ====
The RA3 car bogies consist of a frame, two wheel sets, a system comprising axle box springs and a central pneumatic suspension, drawbars, braking equipment with air pipes and sensors; the traction bogies are also fitted with wheel-set axle reduction gearboxes with an inter-axle cardan drive, a sanding system and gear lubricators. The wheelbase of the bogies is 2,150 mm; the weight of the traction bogies is 5,800 kg, and the non-traction bogies is 4,400 kg.

The bogie frame is its main load-bearing element consists of two longitudinal side beams and three transverse beams of box section — a wide central beam and two narrow end beams — welded into a single structure from the steel plates. The longitudinal and end beams, with the exception of the rear beam of the drive bogie, have a downward camber in the central section, whilst the rear beam of the drive bogie has an upward camber, beneath which the cardan shaft passes. Brackets and bushings are welded to the frame for mounting the axle assemblies, the suspension system, vibration dampers, braking equipment and the pneumatic system, as well as tie rods and other components projecting downwards and to the sides of the frame from both the outer and inner sides. Longitudinal tie rods, designed for tension and compression and secured to the bogies at the centre of the central beam via a kingpin, are used to transmit traction and braking forces from each bogie to the body frame.

The bogies are fitted with a two-stage spring suspension system. In the central body suspension stage, the body rests on the frame of each bogie via diaphragm-type air springs, positioned centrally on the longitudinal beams in the underframe opposite the centre beam. The air springs are filled with compressed air from the pneumatic system and allow the body height to be adjusted according to the train’s passenger load by varying the air pressure; furthermore, they absorb the deformation when the bogies rotate relative to the body. Inside each air spring there is a rubber-metal support which bears the weight of the body when the air spring is deflated. Pneumatic reservoirs are mounted beneath the bogie’s central beam. To dampen vibrations, hydraulic dampers are fitted in the central section: two vertical dampers, mounted to the bogie frame to the left of the air spring when viewed from the side of the bogie, and two transverse dampers, slightly inclined from the horizontal, mounted to the right of the air spring when viewed from the side.

In the spring suspension bogie stage, the bogie frame rests on four wheel-pair bogie boxes via four spring assemblies (one for each bogie box), each of which consists of two coaxial, concentric coil springs with opposite coiling directions. Each axle box has two horizontal links: the link on the side of the center beam is situated at the center of the axle box and is attached to the bogie frame via a swivel rubber-metal joint, whilst the link on the side of the bogie end, with its base at the bottom of the axle box, is situated below it and serves as a support for the spring assembly. To dampen vertical oscillations, vertical hydraulic dampers are mounted in parallel with each spring assembly on the outer edge, attached to the bogie box lever and the side of the bogie frame.

Wheel sets consist of an axle, two solid-rolled wheels and two axle boxes fitted to the axle journals at either end. The axles of the driving bogies are fitted with traction gearboxes, positioned in the center of the axle and supported on the axle via bearings. The axle boxes serve to transfer the load from the weight of the body and the bogie frames to the axles of the wheel sets, as well as to transmit longitudinal traction and braking forces to the bogie frame. Overheating sensors, axial anti-sway sensors and steering angle sensors are fitted to the axle boxes of the wheel sets.

A two-stage axial gearbox is mounted centrally on the rear axle of the drive bogie, whilst a single-stage gearbox is fitted to the front axle. The gearboxes are connected to the bogie’s center beam via reaction rods, through which traction and braking forces from the wheel sets are transmitted to the bogie frame. The two-stage rear-axle gearbox is driven by a cardan shaft from the hydraulic transmission at the rear and, in the first stage, drives the intermediate shaft via a helical-bevel gear with a ratio of approximately 1.2. The first-stage intermediate shaft, in turn, drives both the rear axle via a bevel gear train with a transmission ratio of 2.78, and the inter-axle cardan shaft, which rotates the front-axle reduction gearbox, driving the front axle via a bevel gear train in a manner similar to the second stage of the rear-axle reduction gearbox with the same ratio. The overall gear ratio of the gearboxes is approximately 3.32. Initially, RA3 multiple units were fitted with axle gearboxes manufactured by ZF (Germany), but in September 2020, as part of the import substitution programme, gearboxes manufactured by the Demikhovsky Machine-Building Plant were certified; production of these gearboxes began alongside that of the wheel sets.

Four block brakes, comprising pneumatic brake cylinders, a lever transmission system and single-sided brake shoes, are fitted beneath the bogie’s longitudinal beams, between the axles and the air reservoirs. When the pressure in the brake line drops, the pneumatic brake cylinders rotate the lever mechanism, which presses the brake shoes against the wheel rims. Two brake units, positioned diagonally on the left-hand side when viewed from the side of the bogie, are fitted with an air spring chamber that ensures the brake shoes are pressed against the rims during parking braking.

The front (driving) bogie is fitted with a system for spreading sand from sand hoppers to the wheels, which is activated to improve rail grip (when braking or accelerating), as well as a system for lubricating the wheel flanges to reduce wear

RA3 diesel multiple unit bogies

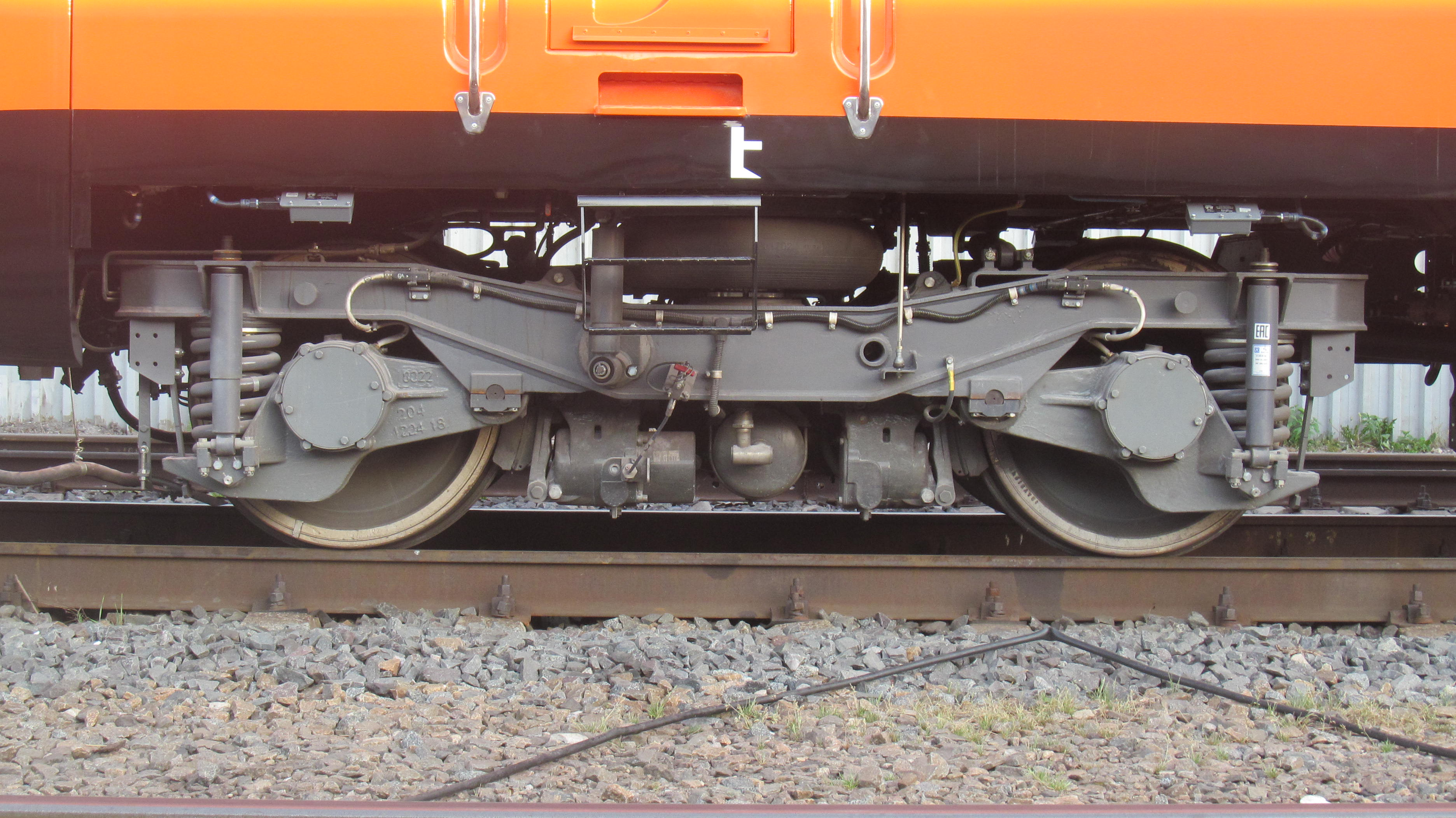
Traction bogie (model 753.10.31.00.010) of the car RA3-00202

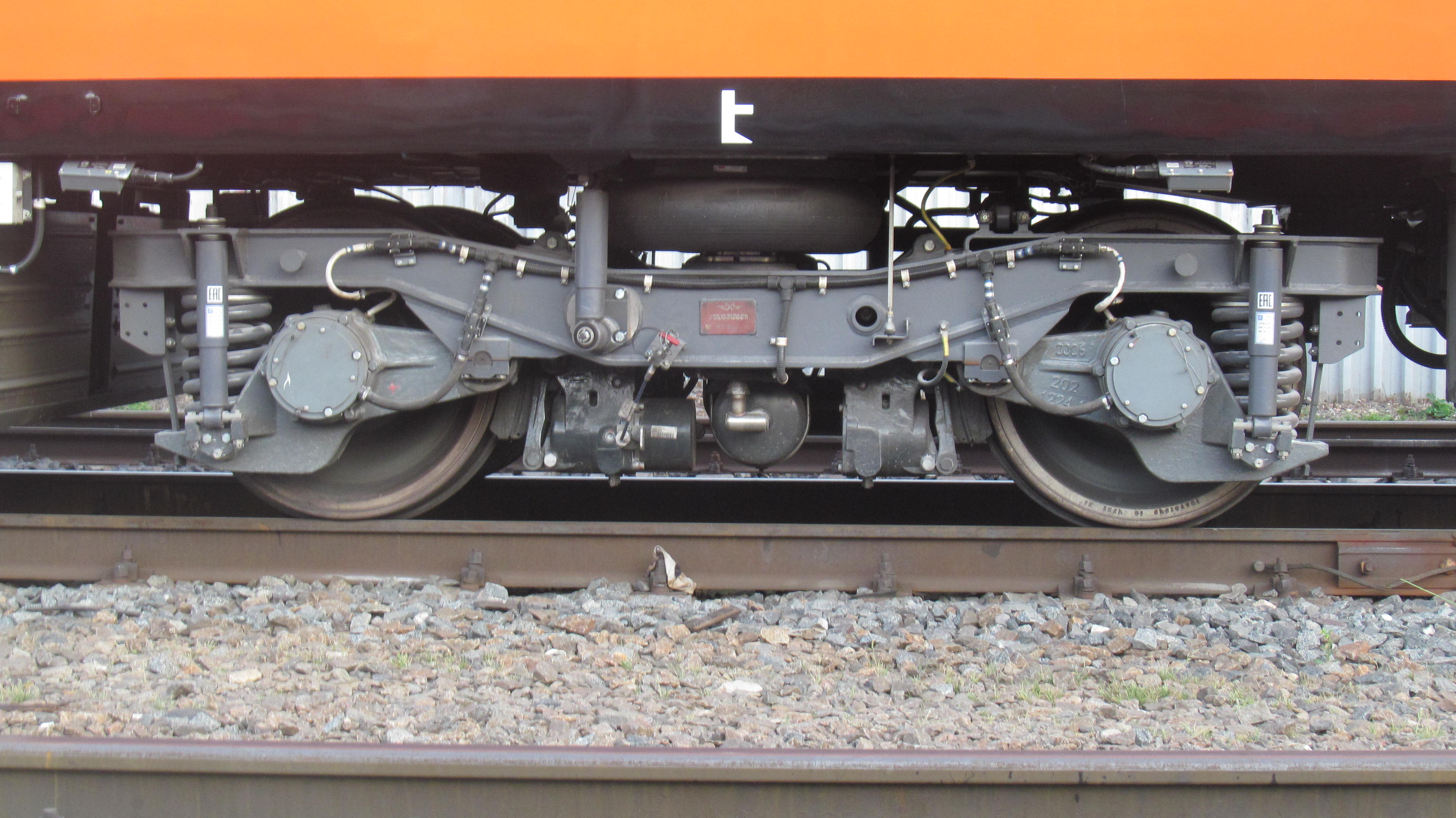
Trailing bogie (model 753.10.31.00.010) of the car RA3-00202

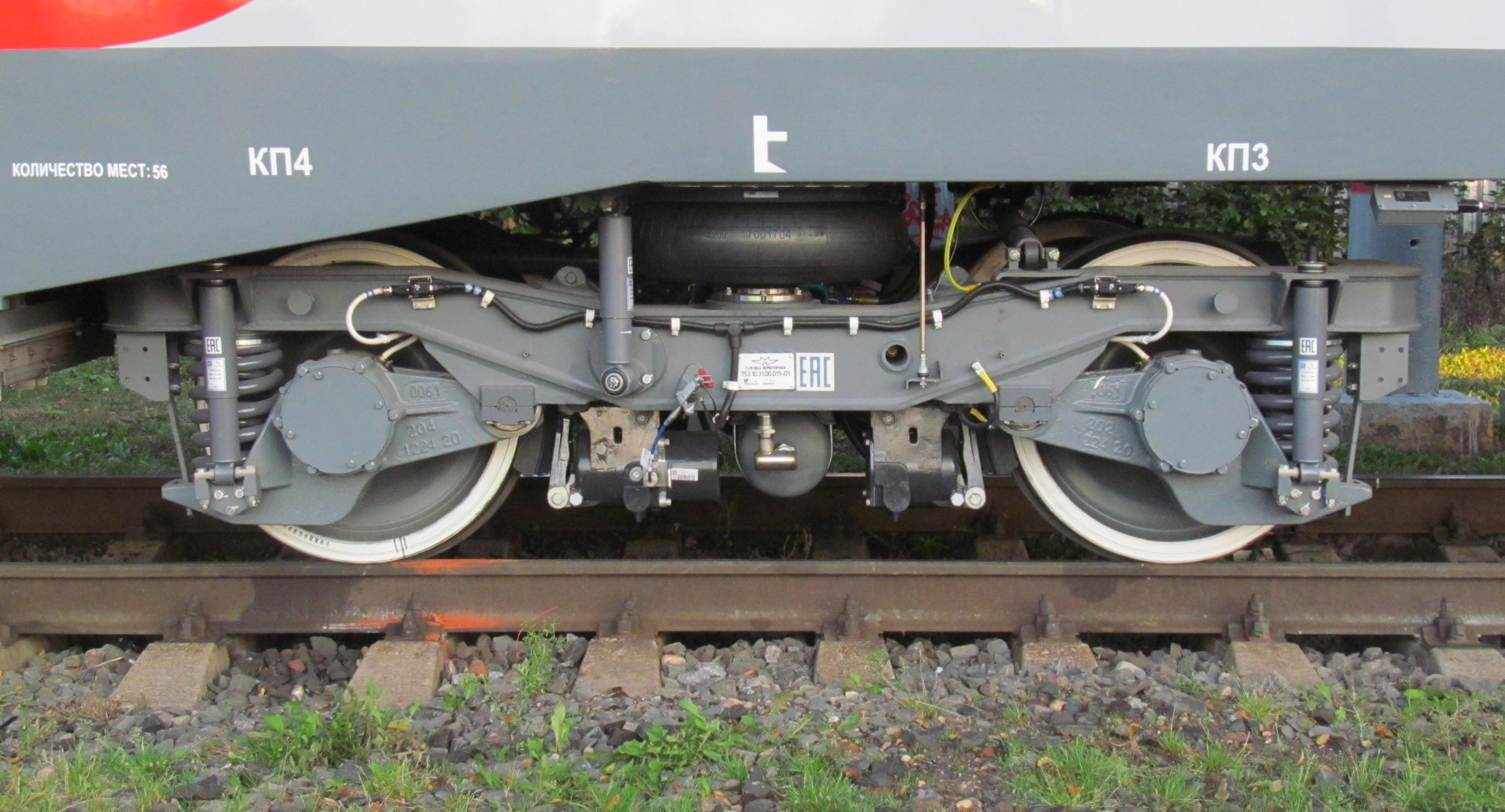
Trailing bogie (model 753.10.31.00.011-01) of the car RA3-04403

=== Power unit ===
A drive module — an MTU 6H 1800 R83P PowerPack diesel-hydraulic power unit (manufactured by MTU Friedrichshafen, Germany), is installed beneath the underbody of each leading car. In this module, the MTU 6H 1800 R83 engine is combined with a Voith T211 re.4 hydraulic transmission; it also houses an on-board generator, a starter and all the engine’s main functional systems – cooling, starting, air filtration, fuel and lubrication. The overall length, width and height of the power module is 3,200 × 2,200 × 790 mm, with a mass of 3,700 kg when dry and 3,900 kg when filled with fluids.

==== Diesel engine and its systems ====
The MTU 6H 1800 R83 diesel engine is a four-stroke, inline, six-cylinder engine with a direct fuel injection system and turbocharging. The engine's cylinders are arranged horizontally in a row at the same level as the crankshaft. The engine cylinder head is equipped with six high-pressure fuel injection pumps, one for each cylinder. The diameter of each cylinder is 128 mm, the piston stroke is 166 mm, and the total cylinder displacement is 6 × 2.14 = 12.84 liters. The engine's rated power is 360 kW at a rotational speed of 1800 rpm, the maximum torque is 2200 N⋅m at 1300 rpm, and the specific fuel consumption is 210–218 g/kWh at rated power and 198–200 g/kWh in optimal mode (at 60% of rated power). The engine's length, width, and height are 1465 × 1331 × 715 mm, and its dry weight is 990 kg.

The engine is designed to run on diesel fuel that meets the EN 590 standard. The fuel is stored in two fuel tanks, each with a capacity of 350 liters, mounted on the frame under the car body and connected by a pipeline. A centrifugal fuel lift pump is installed between them, which pumps fuel into the supply line before starting the diesel through fuel filters and heat exchangers to heat it in cold temperatures, as well as during the operation of fuel heaters through their circuit. After the diesel starts, the fuel lift pump is turned off, and the engine's own fuel pump takes over, sending the fuel through individual high-pressure fuel pumps to the engine cylinder injectors.

Atmospheric air for fuel combustion is sucked in through the air duct and passes through the intake filter, after which it is compressed by the turbocharger and goes through the air cooler into the engine cylinders. Exhaust gases pass through the turbocharger turbine wheel to drive it and then through the noise muffler, where products of incomplete combustion are also separated from them, and then they exit into the atmosphere through the exhaust pipe that leads out through the roof.

The power unit has a liquid cooling system that includes an expansion tank, a pump driven by the engine via a belt, an electric pump for pre-heating mode when the diesel is off, and a piping system with heat exchangers. The coolant removes excess heat from the running engine, the hydraulic drive, the onboard generator, and the oil systems, and then, when the temperature is above 75°C, it is cooled in a fan-ventilated radiator. During cold weather, before cooling in the radiator, it is also used to transfer heat to the cabin heating system and to warm up the fuel system. The normal operating temperature of the coolant is between 95 and 97°C, and the critical temperature at which the engine shuts down to prevent damage is 110°C. To allow the engine to start in low temperatures, there's an independent coolant heater that works off the battery or an external power source.

The engine has two oil systems — one for lubrication and another for the hydrostatic auxiliary drive. The engine lubrication oil is stored in the oil pan and is delivered to the moving parts through a filter and heat exchangers using an oil pump driven by the engine's crankshaft. In the hydrostatic auxiliary drive system, the oil is stored in a special tank and delivered through two independent circuits to drive the onboard generator and the fans for the charge air and coolant cooling system. In each circuit, a high-pressure hydraulic pump driven by the crankshaft moves the oil, which in turn drives the generator and fan hydraulic motors. The fan speed is controlled by a metering valve with an electronic control system, depending on the temperature of the charge air and coolant.

==== Hydraulic transmission ====
The Voith T211 re.4 hydrodynamic-type hydraulic transmission is located in front of the diesel engine and is connected to it via a flange connection. It has a torque converter, a hydraulic clutch, a KB190 hydrodynamic brake retarder, and a mechanical reversing transmission. The transmission has two circuits for circulating transmission oil depending on the driving speed—through the torque converter and the hydraulic clutch—and it allows operation in hydrodynamic braking and reversing modes. Switching its operating modes is done automatically using an electro-hydraulic control system. The length, width, and height of the hydraulic transmission housing are 1130 × 1095 × 675 mm, the weight is 900 kg, oil capacity is 75 liters, the maximum output shaft torque is 6000 N·m, and the torque of the auxiliary power take-off system is 800 N·m.

The torque from the engine shaft is transmitted directly to the input shaft of the hydrodrive, which through a gear drives the pump shaft, rigidly connected to the pump wheels of the torque converter and the hydraulic clutch. Inside the pump shaft, coaxial with it, is the turbine shaft, rigidly connected to the turbine wheels of the torque converter, the hydraulic clutch, and the pump wheel of the hydrodynamic brake. The tractive force from the pump shaft to the turbine is transmitted through the transmission oil in the torque converter (at low speeds) or the hydraulic clutch (at high speeds) while they are filled. The turbine shaft drives the coaxial movable shaft of the reversing mechanism through an engaging gear, which can move forward or backward under the action of oil in the reverse cylinder. It connects to the output shaft through a gear when moving forward, or through a system of several gears with an intermediate shaft when moving backward, thus changing the direction of the output shaft's rotation. To avoid gear damage, reversing is only allowed when the train is completely stopped and the diesel is either off or idling. The output shaft of the hydrodynamic transmission transfers torque to the front bogie’s axle reducer through a cardan drive.

When starting the train and moving at low to medium speeds, a torque converter is used, where the difference in torque between the pump and turbine wheels is transferred to the fixed guide wheel. This allows smooth automatic regulation of the oil flow and increases the turbine wheel's torque, which decreases as the speed picks up. Later, when the torque of the pump and turbine wheels in the torque converter equalizes, the drive switches to the fluid coupling by filling its circuit with oil and emptying the torque converter circuit. In the hydrodynamic coupling, the torques of the pump and turbine wheels match. Switching back from the hydrodynamic coupling to the torque converter happens at a lower speed to avoid constant shifting. When the train is parked or coasting, the torque converter and the hydrodynamic coupling are drained. During braking, according to the controller's signal, the hydrodynamic brake-retarder is filled with oil, where the braking torque acts on its pump wheel, creating resistance to the turbine shaft rotation and converting the train's kinetic energy into the heat energy of the oil, which is then taken away by the cooling system.

=== Electrical equipment ===
The power supply for the control circuits and electrical consumers of the RA3 diesel train comes from the aforementioned electric generators and/or batteries (accumulators). The train has three-phase AC circuits with a frequency of 50 Hz and a nominal line voltage of 380–400 V (phase voltage is 220–230 V), as well as DC circuits: 24 V for powering the control and engine starting systems, and 110 V for lighting, electro-pneumatic equipment and train safety systems, as well as ventilation in emergency mode.

When the train's power units are running, the previously mentioned onboard three-phase AC generators are used to supply the train's electrical circuits and charge the batteries. The generator is a synchronous electric machine in a brushless, non-salient pole design with a voltage regulator, driven by a hydraulic motor. The onboard generator's output line and phase voltages are 400 and 230 V respectively, the current frequency is 50 Hz, and the maximum power is 70 kVA. During extended stops of the train, if the batteries need charging while the engines are off, it’s possible to connect an external power source to the car with an output voltage of 3×380 V; however, to avoid short-circuits in the onboard network due to voltage phase differences between the generator and the external source, engine startup is not allowed. A starter powered by the 24 V battery is used to start the engine.

For powering DC consumers when the main engines are stopped, ZeMa lead-acid onboard batteries are used, installed under the frames of the cars. Each car is equipped with two batteries: a 12ZeMa200 with a voltage of 24 V, consisting of 12 batteries each with a capacity of 200 Ah and 2 V, and a 9x6ZeMa170 with a voltage of 110 V, consisting of 54 batteries each with a capacity of 170 Ah and 2 V.

To power DC circuits and recharge the batteries when the engines are running or an external power source is connected, converters for 110 V and 24 V are installed, respectively. Additionally, to power the locomotive's electronic equipment (the BLOK-M safety system, the brake equipment unit, and the processor-based anti-slip device), a DC converter is installed that lowers the 110 V network voltage to 50 V.

Some of the electrical devices and equipment are placed in cabinets installed in cabins, vestibules, or passenger compartments. Others are located in boxes under the car frames or on the roofs of the cars.

=== Safety, control and diagnostic systems ===
To ensure safe operation, the RA3 multiple unit is equipped with the following systems:

- by the BLOK-M security system;
- fire detection and suppression system of the PAK ASOTP;
- with the KTS-POS fire and security alarm system;
- with a security alarm;
- digital information complex (onboard communication and passenger information) CIC-RA3;
- by radio dispatch communication;
- with the locomotive video-audio recording complex "KVARTS";
- with an external and internal video surveillance system (SVN);
- microprocessor control and diagnostics system "SKIF-RA".

Additionally to the security alarm, the multiple unit car doors are equipped with mechanical locks to prevent unauthorized people from getting inside the train.

==== Traffic control ====
Control of the composition is carried out from the cab of the Mg car driver. Transfer of control from one driver's cab to another (for example, when changing the direction of travel at the terminal station) is carried out in the 'Transition' mode. The functional features of the control system and the arrangement of the controls on the panel make it possible to operate the train with a 'single person' (one driver without an assistant).

The main control of the multiple unit is carried out via digital control buses. The management of modes of travel en route and the monitoring of equipment condition are performed automatically or manually by the "SKIF-RA" management and diagnostic system. The power plant and hydraulic transmission have an integrated microprocessor control system that allows for automatic regulation of fuel supply and diesel engine speed, oil fill level, and switching of hydraulic transmission units, switching them to hydrodynamic braking and reversing modes if necessary. The RA3 movement cycle provides for three modes: acceleration, coasting, and braking.

After the battery voltage is supplied to the starter, the engine of the power plant starts. Upon completion of the start, the onboard consumers are powered by the generators of the power plant. Before the start of movement, the direction of the vehicle is set using the reverser located on the control panel, while the reversing mechanism of the hydro transmission is switched.

The train driver's controller handle sets the driving mode and has four operational positions: “X” (movement), “0” (stop or coasting), “T” (braking), and “E” (emergency braking). It can be set to the corresponding position of the driving or braking mode, thereby changing the traction or braking force. To switch from neutral mode to driving mode, it is pressed from the top and then moved forward, and to switch to braking mode — backward.

When the controller is switched to driving mode, the torque converter is filled with oil, and the torque from the diesel engine is transmitted through the clutch, hydraulic transmission, input shaft, two-stage gearbox, inter-axle driveshaft, and single-stage gearbox to the corresponding wheelset, as a result of which the diesel train smoothly starts moving. The driver has the option to activate the automatic speed maintenance mode, which is monitored by the control system. If it is necessary to set coasting mode, the torque transmission to the input driveshaft is disconnected.

When switching the controller to braking mode while moving at speeds above 30 km/h, the hydrodynamic brake of the hydraulic transmission is activated. At lower speeds, it becomes ineffective, so electropneumatic valves of the brake line open, ensuring a smooth pressure reduction in it and braking the train using brake pads. To activate emergency braking, it is necessary to pull the handle back with force, which leads to the opening of the pneumatic valve and rapid discharge of the brake line.

==== Diagnostics and control ====
The control and diagnostic system is equipped with the multifunctional display MFDU-K, which shows all the necessary information about the status of systems and equipment. For example, for brake equipment, the display, pressure gauges, and signal indicators provide information on the compressed air pressure values (in the brake and supply lines and the trolley brake cylinders), the integrity of the brake network (based on the compressed air pressure in the brake cylinders of the last car), the circuits of the electro-pneumatic brake, as well as on the release of the brakes (based on the compressed air pressure in the brake cylinders of all cars). The train has an internal diagnostic system for the built-in monitoring of axle box bearing temperature during movement, which automatically sends an emergency signal to the control panel when the allowable temperature threshold of the bearings is exceeded. The MFDU-K display was developed by JSC “VNIIIT named after V. V. Tikhomirov”.

=== Brake equipment ===
The RA3 setup has four braking systems, namely:

- hydrodynamic;
- electropneumatic;
- pneumatic;
- parking (air-spring).

Oil-free VV-120T electric compressors with compressed air drying units are used for supply to the respective compressed air systems. The switching on and off of the electric compressors is carried out automatically, using a pressure regulator, depending on the air pressure in the discharge pipeline. The brake systems are controlled from the driver's cab, while there is the possibility of an emergency stop initiated from the cabin or vestibules using the emergency brake. The braking force is automatically regulated according to the number of passengers being transported. In the event of an electropneumatic brake failure, the automation activates the pneumatic brake; at the same time, a forced discharge of the brake line occurs.

The parking brake ensures that the train is held in place under full load from spontaneous rolling on a track gradient of up to 30 ‰.

=== Interior ===
==== Passenger compartment ====
The passenger compartment of the leading car is divided by a vestibule, located in the middle of the car, into two sections. The front compartment has three pairs of windows and a small windowless space with technical compartments in the rear corners — a narrow one for the exhaust pipe on the left and a wide one for the air intake and expansion tanks of the heating system on the right. The rear compartment has a small corridor with a window on the right and a sanitary unit on the left, behind which is its main section with four pairs of windows. The intermediate car has a single compartment, located between two vestibules at the ends, which has ten pairs of windows and partitions on the sides of the aisle in the middle of the compartment, dividing it into two equal parts.

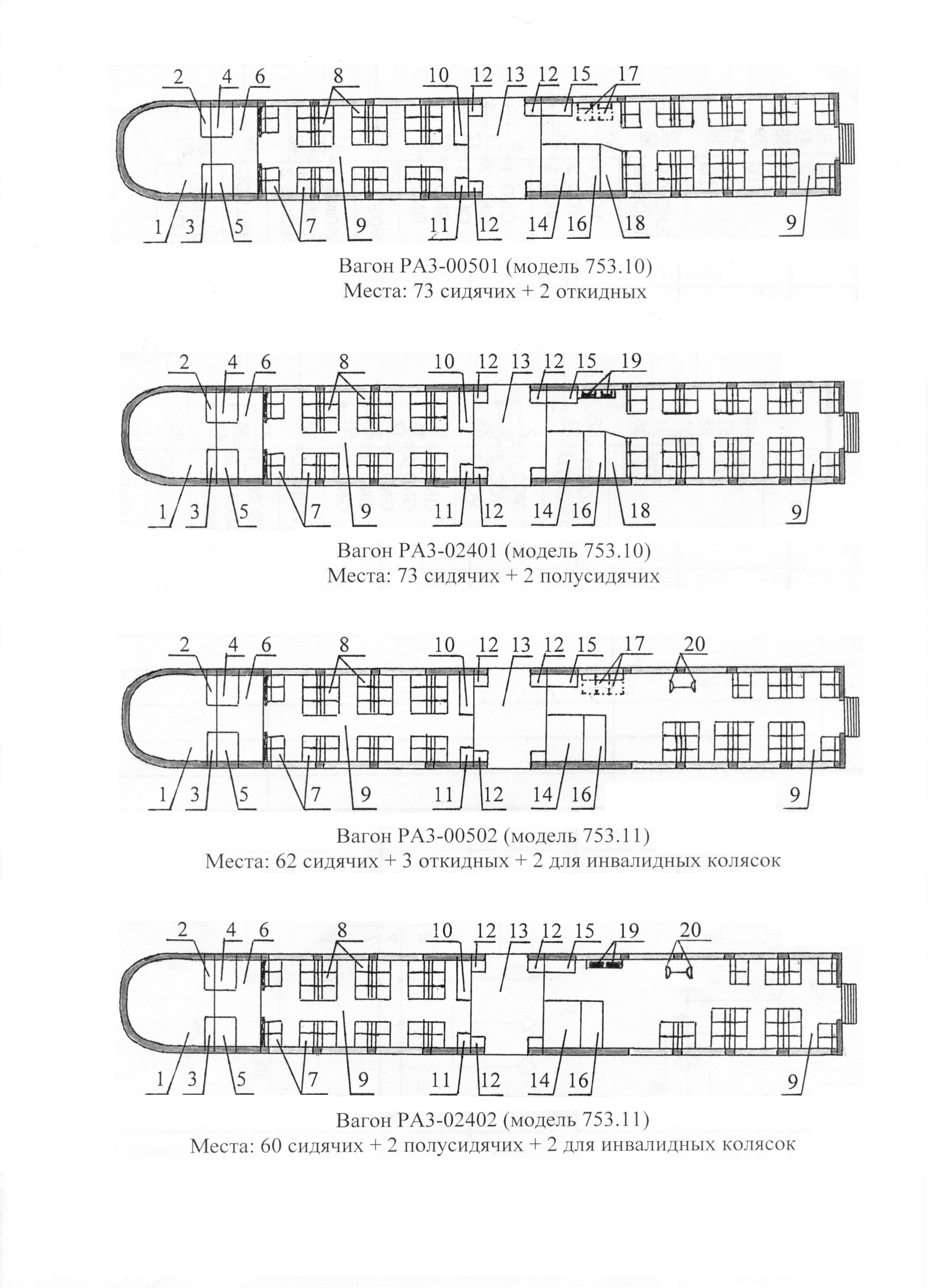

1. Driver's cab
2. Driver's locker
3. Control cabinet
4. Pneumatic equipment cabinet
5. Electrical equipment cabinet
6. Service vestibule of the driver's cab
7. Two-seater passenger seats
8. Three-seater passenger seats
9. Passenger cabins
10. Additional equipment cabinet
11. Exhaust pipe section
12. Vertical decorative covers
13. Passenger vestibule
14. Toilet cubicle of the sanitary unit
15. PZK cabinet
16. Technical compartment of the sanitary unit
17. Folded seats
18. Service room
19. Semi-upright seat
20. Wheelchair lock

===== Layout and design of the passenger seats =====
External videos
- RA3-005: overview of the cabin and interior with three-color seats on YouTube
- RA3-018: tour of the interior of a three-car train with three-colored seats on YouTube
- RA3-027 and 028: cabin and interior overview with blue seats on YouTube
- RA3-024: interior view in gray trim with semi-seats on YouTube
- RA3-04x: tour of the second-class three-car train interior

The passenger cars are equipped with seats featuring headrests. The seats are arranged longitudinally on both sides of the main aisle in a 3+2 or 2+2 configuration, and in some sections of the carriage — 3+0 or 2+0. The type of seats, their quantity, and arrangement in rows depend both on the class of the carriage and on the type of carriage and its section. In the 753.11 model carriage, the space at the rear of the cabin on the right side near its two front windows, excluding the window in the aisle, is allocated for the passage of passengers in wheelchairs. There are no seats or luggage racks above the windows in this part of the cabin, and two vertical support backs are installed on special stands at the front and rear, equipped with fastenable straps and hooks for securing wheelchairs. In the leading cars, in the corridor opposite the restroom block under the window, there are either fold-down seats — two in car model 753.10 and three in car model 753.11 (the default option on most trains)[, or inclined leaning half-seats for standing passengers to rest against, two in each car (the option used on trains to Sakhalin).

In the third-class compartment, seats with straight backs are installed opposite each other, located between the windows, with two rows by the window. The leading car of model 753.10 has 73 seats: 34 of them are located in the front section in seven rows (the last row is in the windowless part), and another 39 in the rear section in eight rows. Almost every row has a 3+2 seating arrangement, except for the first row in the front section and the last in the rear, where the seats are arranged 2+2 to allow access to the doors in the service vestibule of the cabin and the inter-car passage. The other leading car of model 753.11, designed with seats for disabled passengers, has 60 seats — 34 in the front and 26 in the rear section. The seating arrangement in it is similar to car 753.10, but thirteen of the seats are missing in the rear section: on the right, instead of the first eight seats, there is an area for wheelchairs, and on the left, to provide sufficient width for wheelchair passage, the first three-seat row behind the sanitary block and one seat by the aisle in the second and third rows are absent. There is also a possible cabin layout with 62 seats and a reduced area for wheelchairs, in which an additional row of two seats is installed opposite the rear backrest. The intermediate car of the 753.20 model has 96 seats arranged in 20 rows: the two outer rows near the entrance and two middle rows near the partition have a 2+2 configuration, while the others follow a 3+2 configuration from the vestibule to the middle, after which it changes to the reverse 2+3 configuration.

The second-class cabin is equipped with soft individual seats with adjustable reclining backrests and armrests arranged in a 2+2 configuration. Unlike the third-class cabin, they all face in the same direction, with the back of each seat oriented towards the seat in the preceding row, and are spaced further apart from each other and from adjacent rows, approximately three rows per two windows. Between each pair of seats, there is one standard 220V electrical outlet and two USB ports for charging mobile devices, while the back of the seats feature foldable tables and mesh pockets for the passengers in the following row. The lead car of the 753.10 model has 42 seats facing the cabin, 20 of which are located in the front part of the cabin in five rows (the last row being in the windowless section), while the remaining 22 are located in the rear part, arranged in six rows on the right and five on the left. Another head car of model 753.11 with spaces for people with disabilities has 36 seats — 20 in the front and 16 in the back of the cabin, where, instead of the first three pairs of seats on the right, there is a platform for wheelchairs, and the rest of the seats are arranged similarly to the 753.10 car. The intermediate car of model 753.20 has 56 seats, arranged in 14 rows facing the nearest vestibule (seven in each direction).

RA3 3rd class passenger cabin

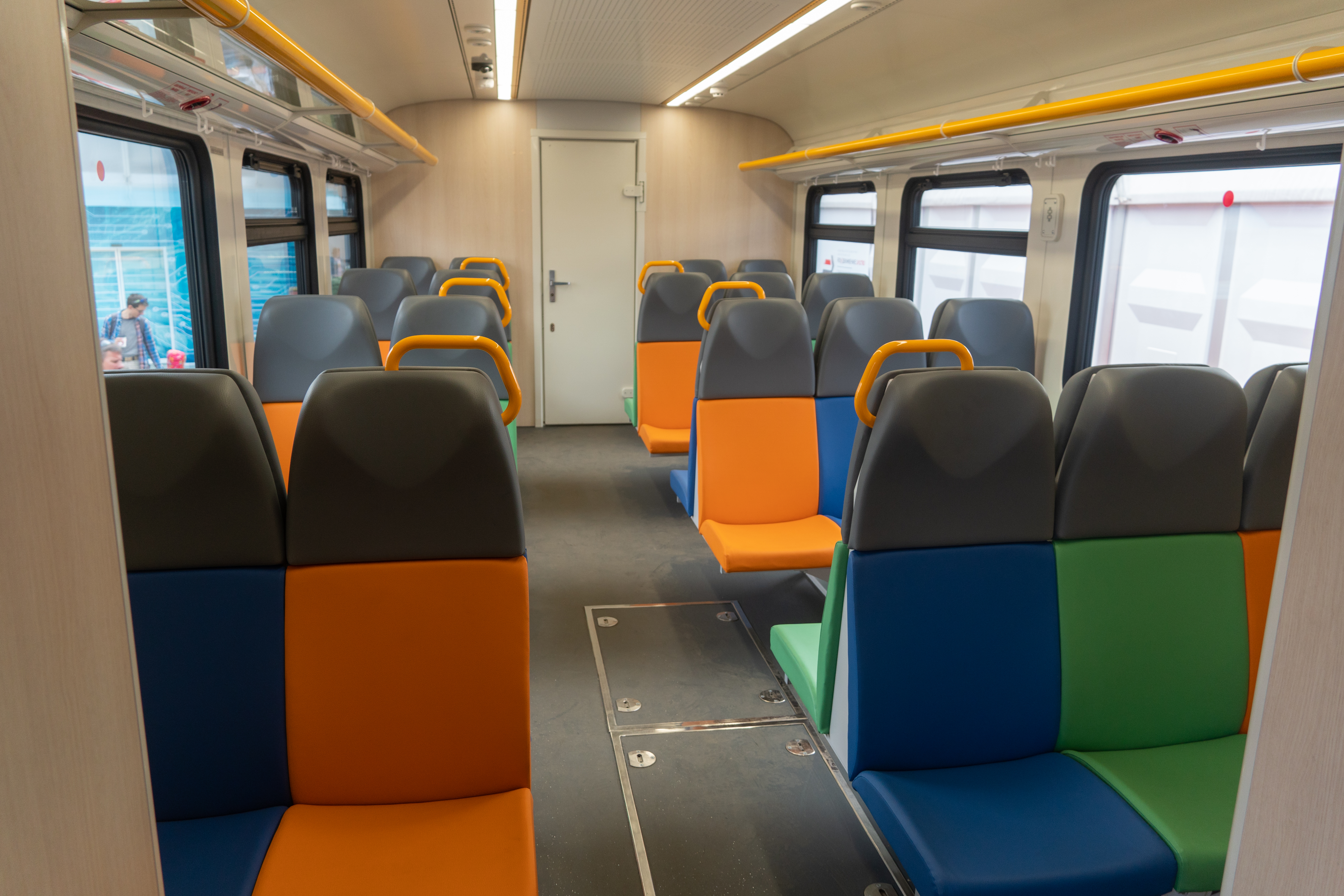
The front part of the leading car, view from the vestibule towards the driver's cab. Access hatches to the power unit are visible on the floor.

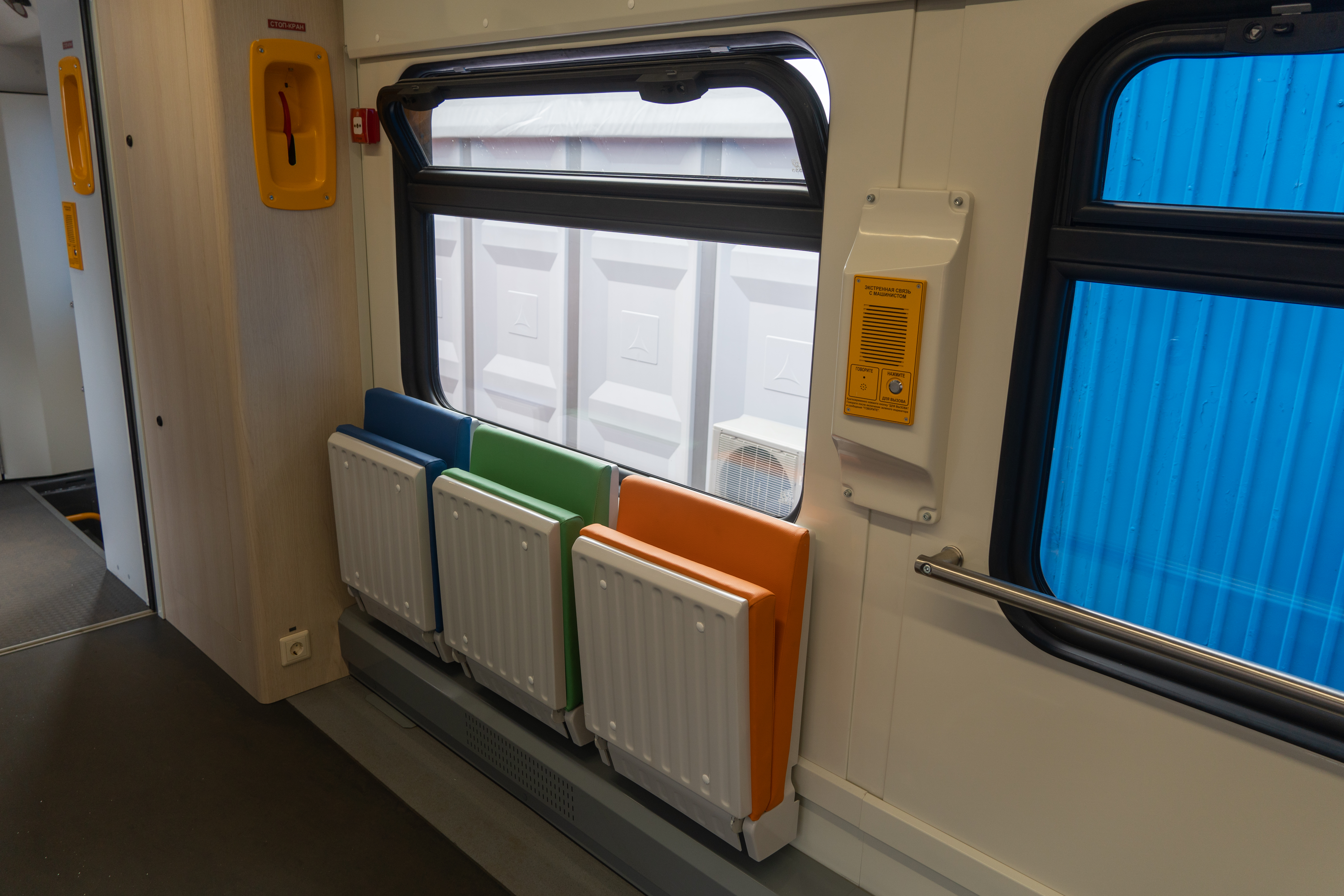
The back part of the leading car of model 753.11, view of the folding side seats opposite the toilet and the emergency communication panel with the driver

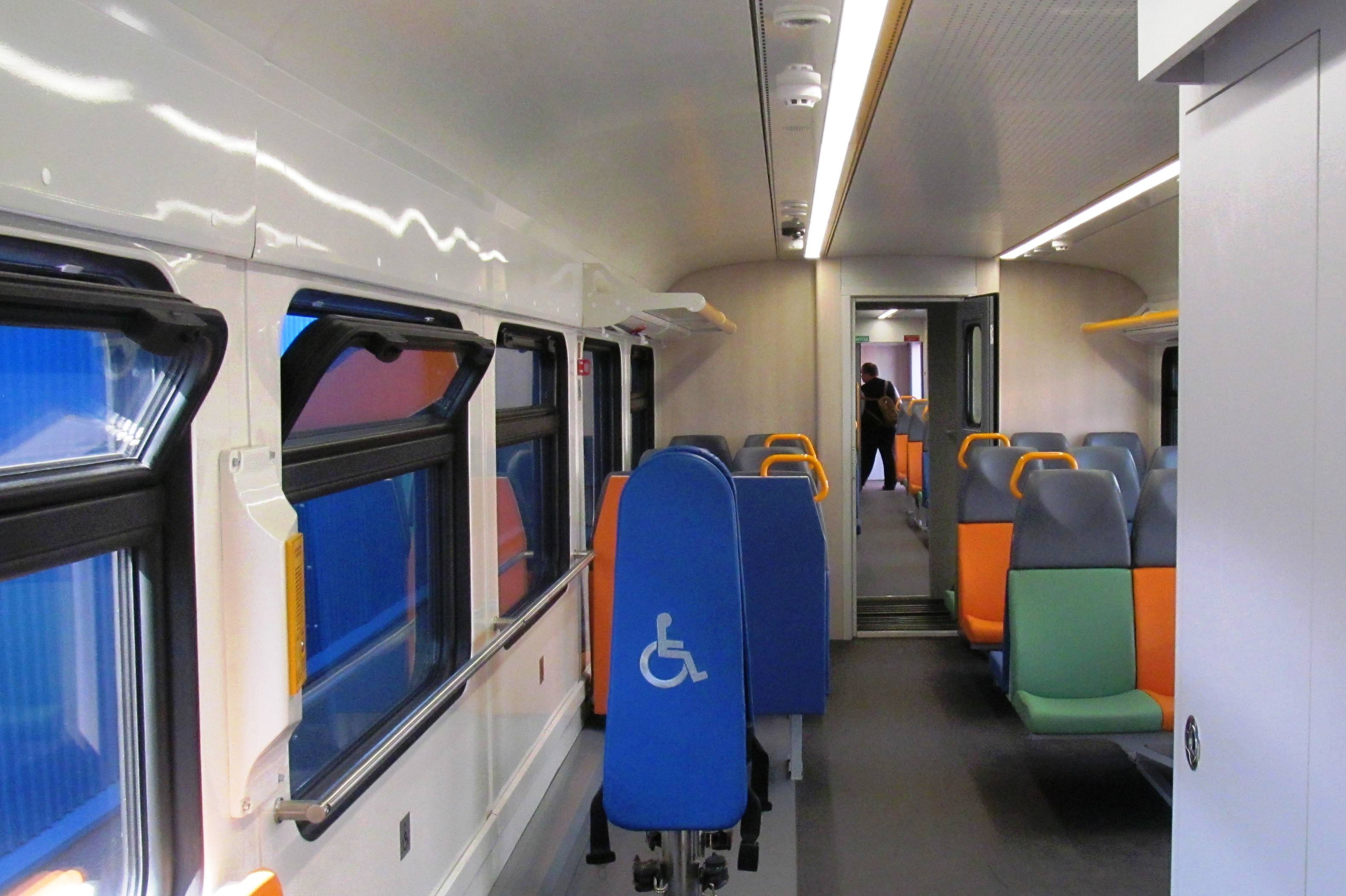
The back part of the leading car of model 753.11, view from the corridor of the spaces for wheelchairs

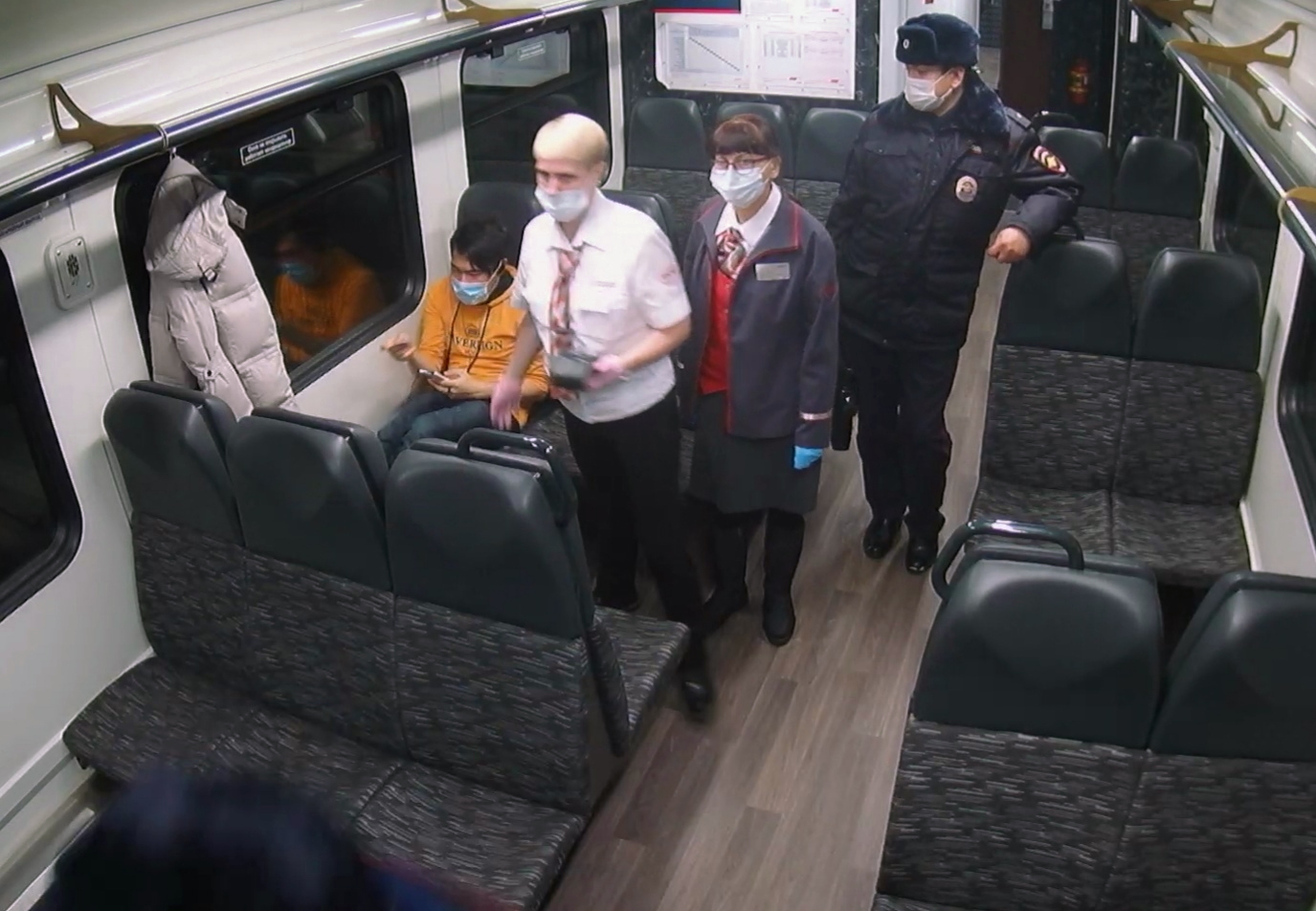
The rear part of the 753.10 model leading car with gray seats, view from the ceiling surveillance camera towards the restroom area

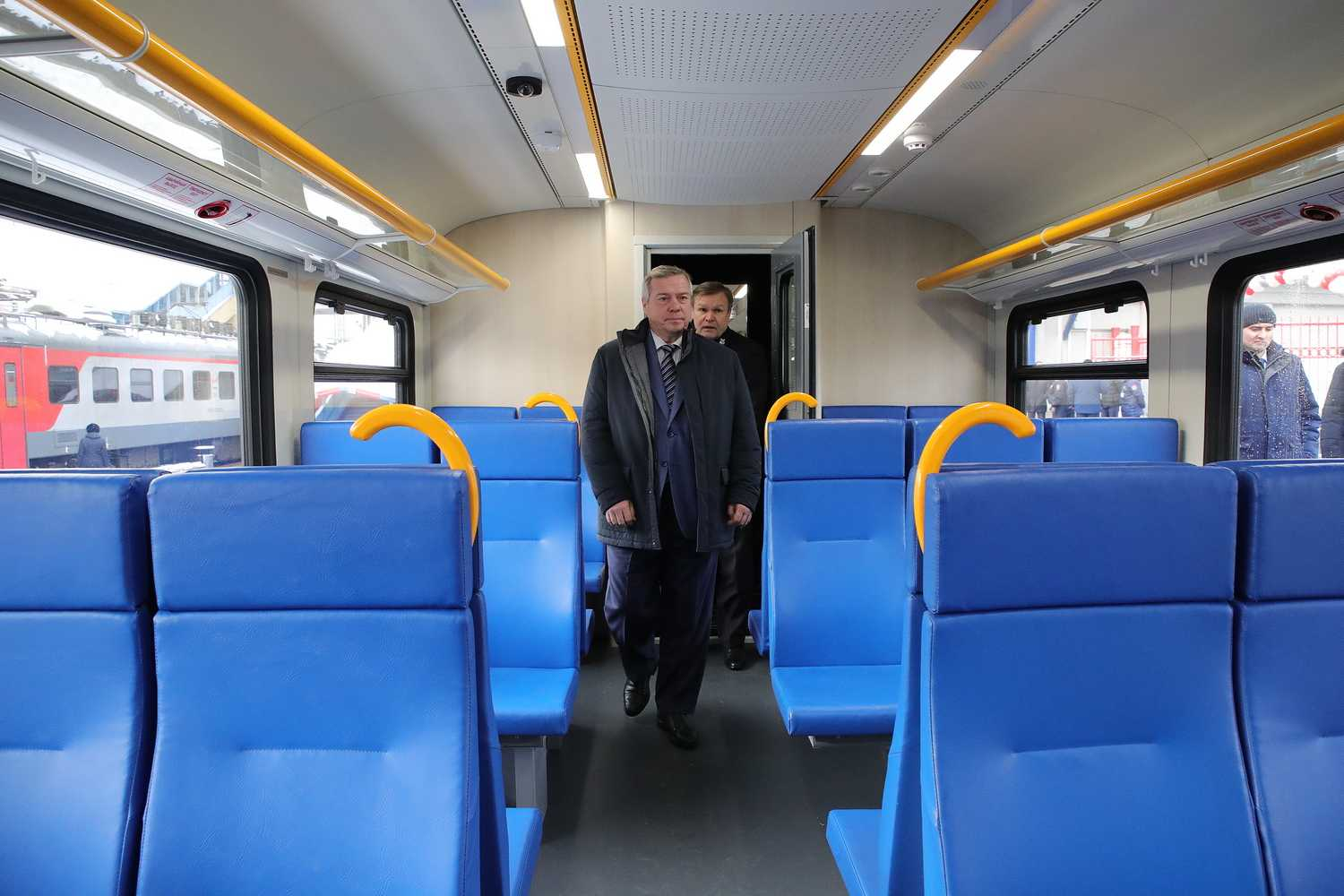
The rear part of the leading car of model 753.10 with blue seats without headrest indentations and open handles, view of the inter-car gangway

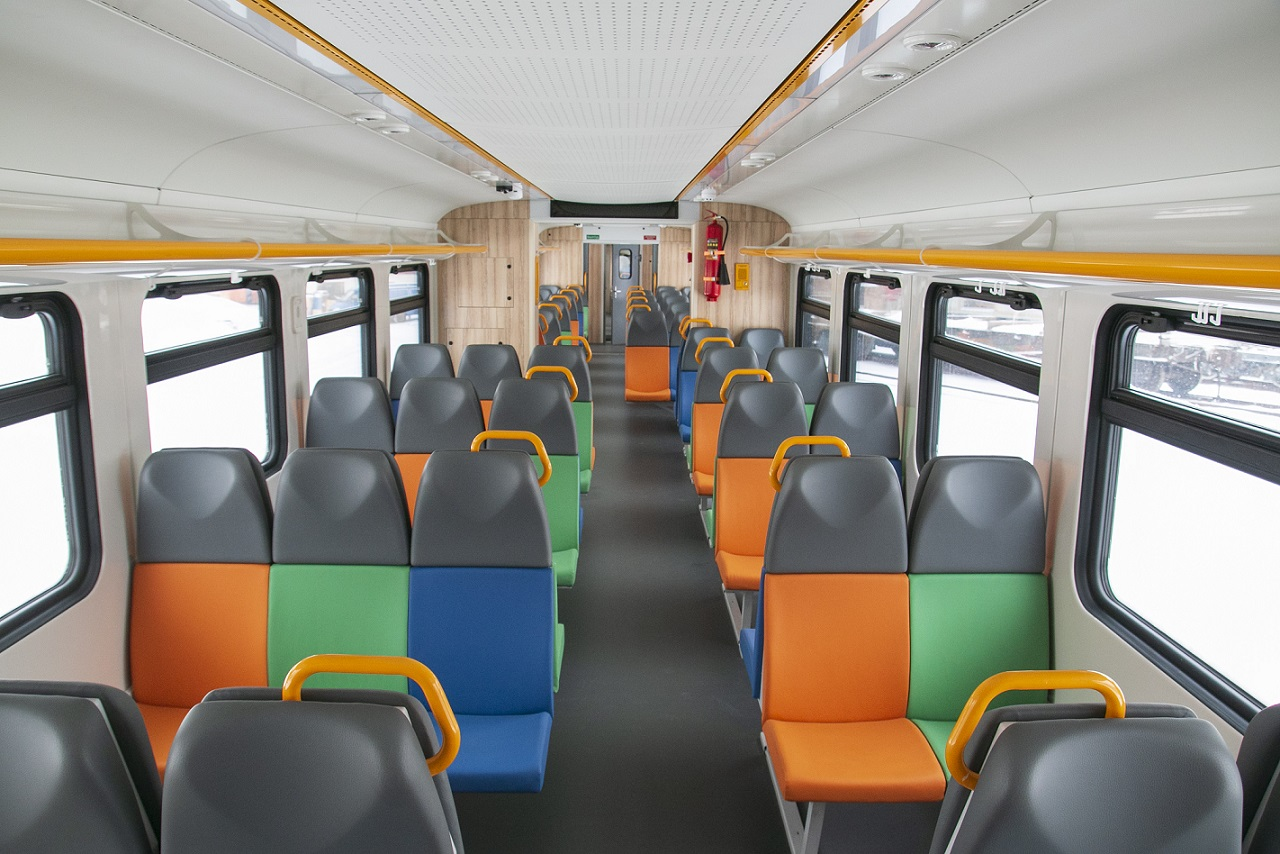
Intermediate car model 753.20, view from the vestibule

===== Finishing and equipment =====
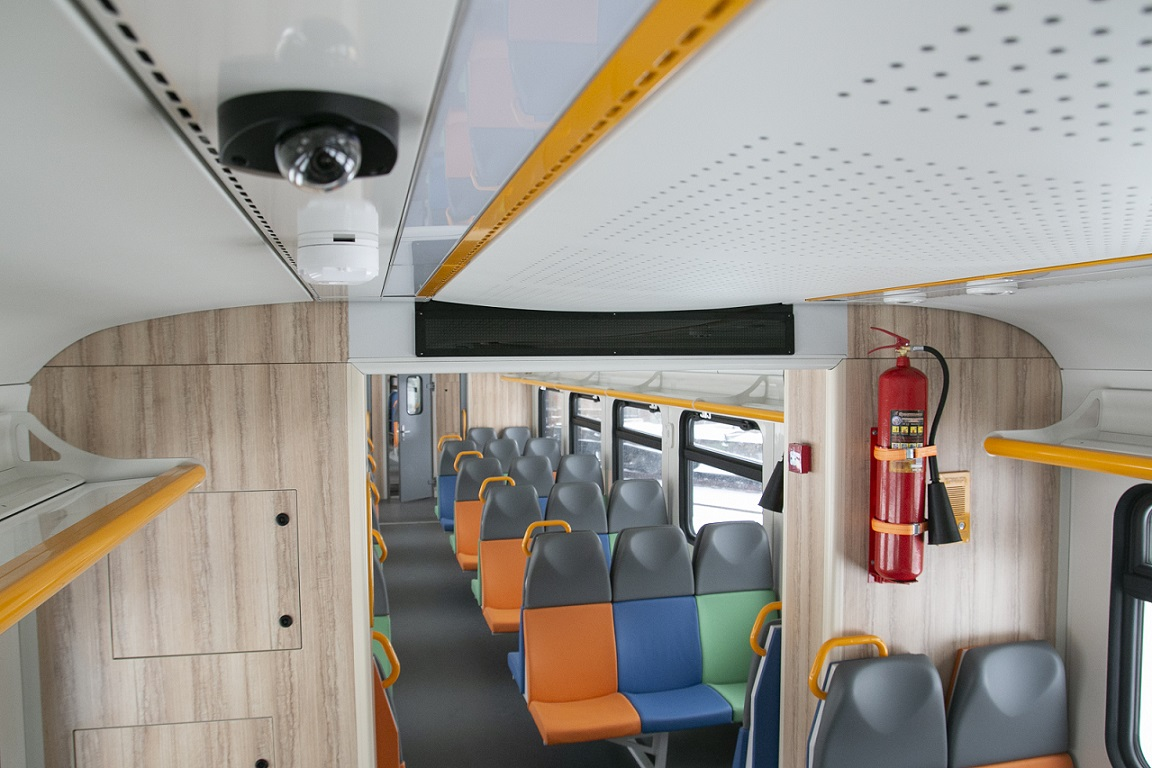
Partition in the middle of the interior of the intermediate RA3 car

The interior is finished with fiberglass panels on the walls and steel sheets with a glossy powder coating on the ceiling. The ceiling in the passenger compartments and vestibules is divided into three parts — a central section with ventilation openings and two curved side sections, with longitudinal light modules installed between them in the passenger compartments. The floor is made of fire-resistant plywood and is covered on top with fire-resistant linoleum with a non-slip surface. In the motor car, there are two hatches on the floor in the area of the power unit for personnel access. The windows of the passenger compartment are sealed double-glass units. Most of them have upper tilt windows, but on both sides of the car there are also two windows without tilt openings that function as emergency exits: in the head cars, these are the rear pair of windows in the front section and the penultimate pair (second from the end wall) in the rear section of the compartment; in the intermediate cars, these are the two outermost pairs of windows near the vestibules. On the side walls, luggage racks and clothes hooks are installed, and in the luggage racks above the windows without vent panels, hammers for breaking the glass in case of an emergency and evacuation ladders are placed. Fire extinguishers are located on the end walls and partitions.

The color scheme of the cabin and passenger seats has several options. In the first two multiple units, the ceiling and all walls were white, the floor and cabin doors were gray, and the edges of the luggage racks and seat handles were yellow. These surface colors in the cabin were retained in subsequent multiple units, but the end walls were styled to resemble wood, receiving a dull cream color (in some trains, the color of the wood-textured end walls is more saturated). Passenger seats in most multiple units have alternating orange, green, and blue colors and are equipped with gray headrests with a head indentation, while backrests for wheelchairs are blue. In some multiple units, such as RA3-002, 027, and 028, all passenger seats are blue and feature a modified design of headrests and handles. In multiple units for Sakhalin (024–026, 044–046), as well as in some trains for other railways (for example, 057–059), the interiors are decorated in a dark gray granite theme: the side walls and ceiling remain white, but the end walls are styled as black granite, and the floor, except for the vestibules, is covered with brown linoleum; the cabin doors, edges of luggage racks, and some handrails are black, while the seats and backs for passengers with disabilities are gray with light stripes.

Interior color scheme variants (using the rear section of car model 753.11 with disabled seating as an example)

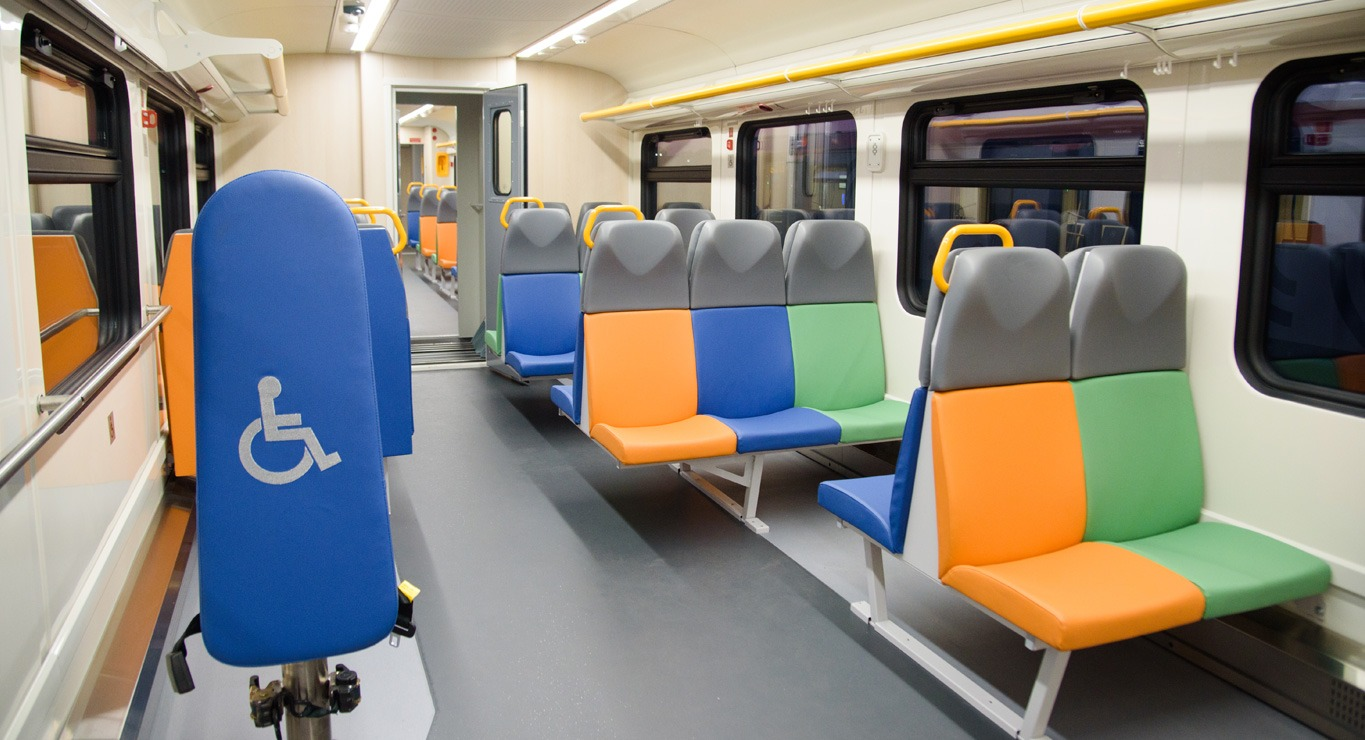
A cabin with three-color seats and blue backs for disabled passengers (the most common variant)

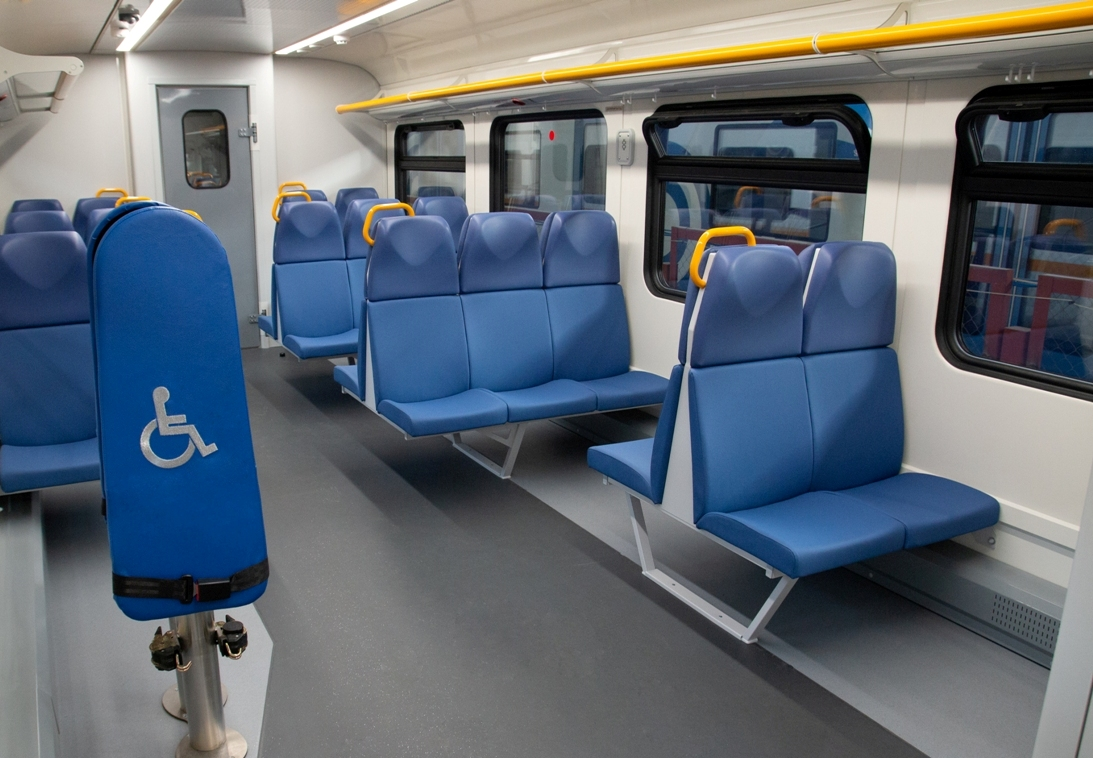
A cabin with blue seats and wheelchair backs, behind which two extra seats are visible

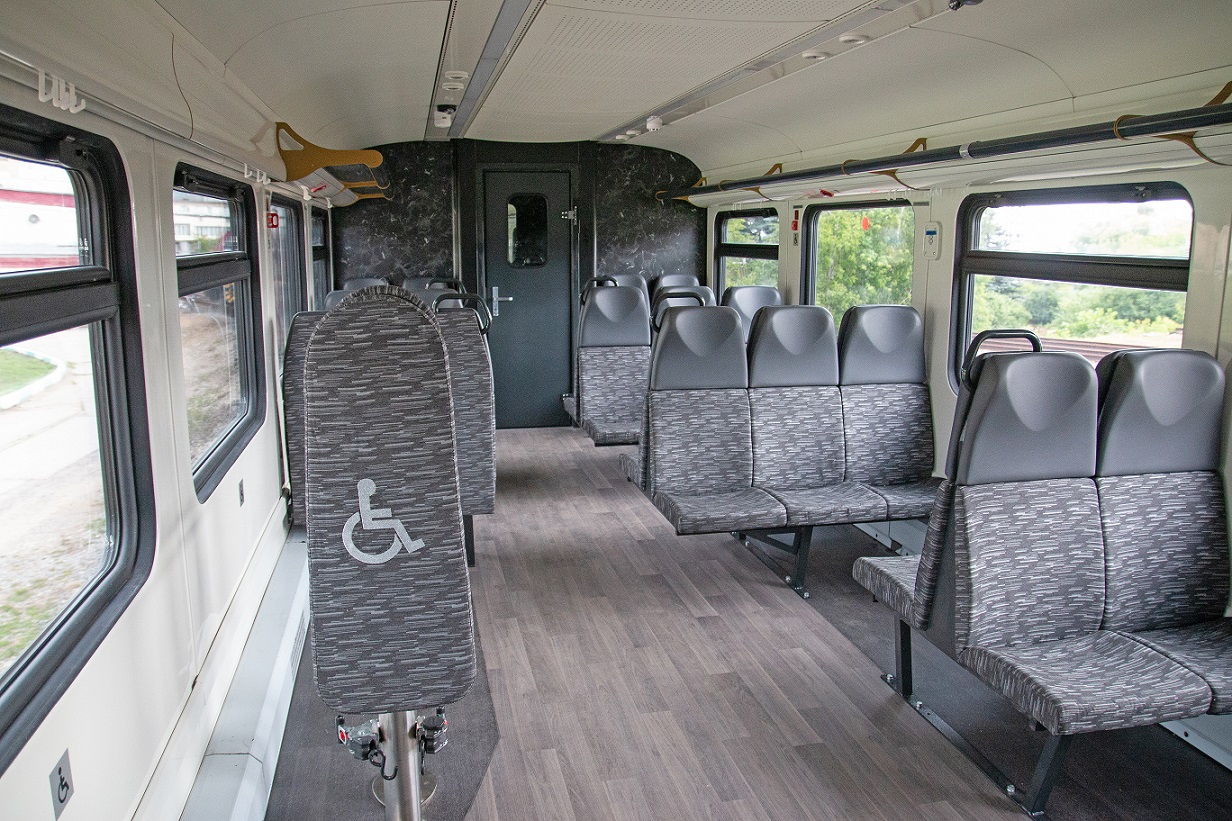
A cabin with gray seats and wheelchair backs, a brown floor, and black end walls

Passenger vestibules allow boarding and alighting from both sides of the car through two-leaf swing-sliding doors. Next to the doors are emergency opening levers, which allow them to be opened manually from the inside in case of an emergency. Inside the vestibule, in front of the doors and below floor level, there are two fixed steps for exiting onto low platforms, complemented by an external folding step. Vertical handrails are installed on either side of the internal steps. On the right side of the steps, when viewed from inside the doors in the end cars and from the end wall side in intermediate cars, there is a folding platform with fixed vertical and horizontal positions, which covers the steps in the lowered position for the convenience of passengers boarding and alighting onto high platforms. In the 753.11 model car, on the left side of the doors when viewed from the inside, there are folded wheelchair lifts with a lifting platform and hydraulic lifting mechanism, which extend outward when it's necessary to board or disembark disbled passengers. Passengers move from the vestibule into the cabin through glazed manual sliding self-closing doors. In the leading cars, there are single-leaf doors, with the passage located on the left side of the partition relative to the direction from the vestibule to the cabin. In the intermediate car, there are double-leaf doors with a passage in the center. In the 753.11 model car, for the convenience of people with disabilities, the sliding door to the rear part of the cabin has an automatic drive, activated by buttons on both sides of the door. In some multiple units, the front cabin doors are equipped with a similar drive as well.

Vestibule

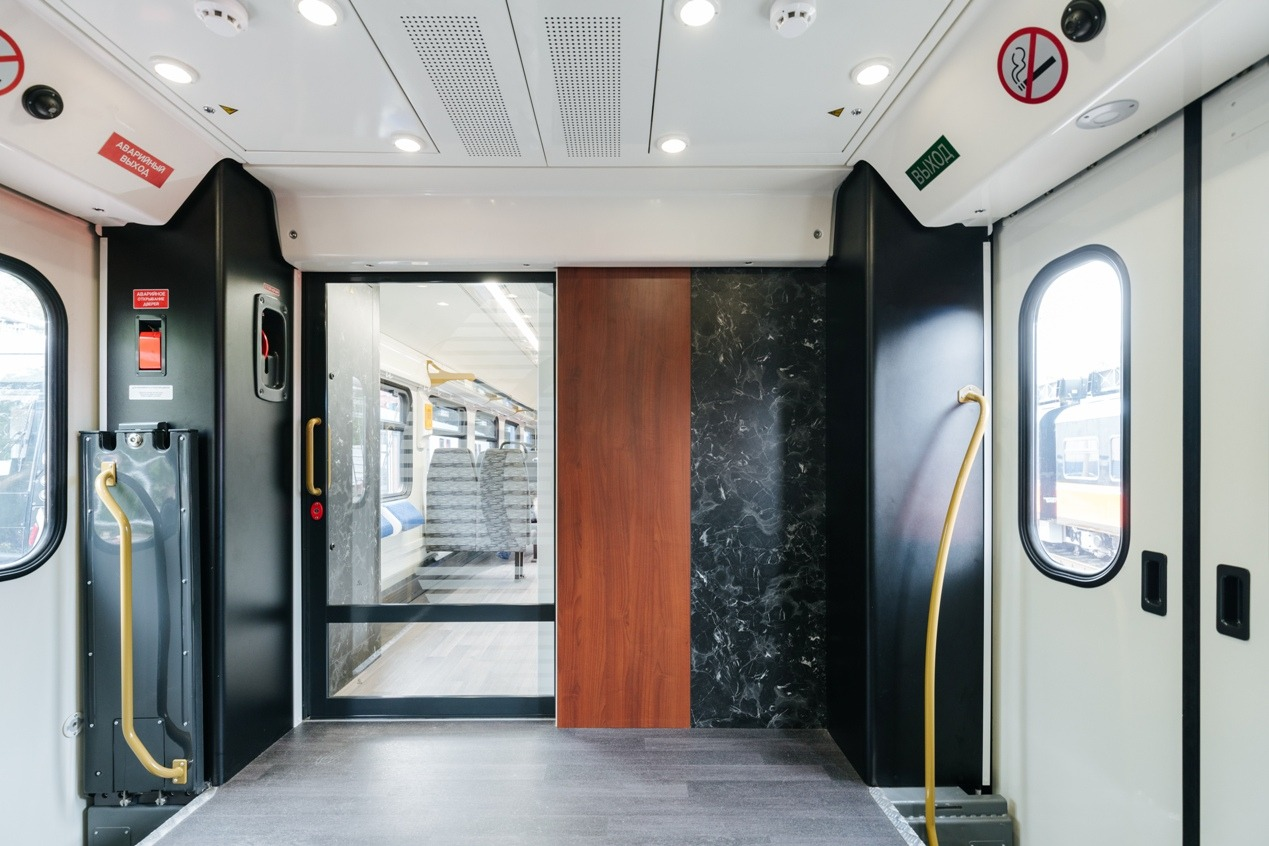
Vestibule of car model 753.10 with black end walls, view backward

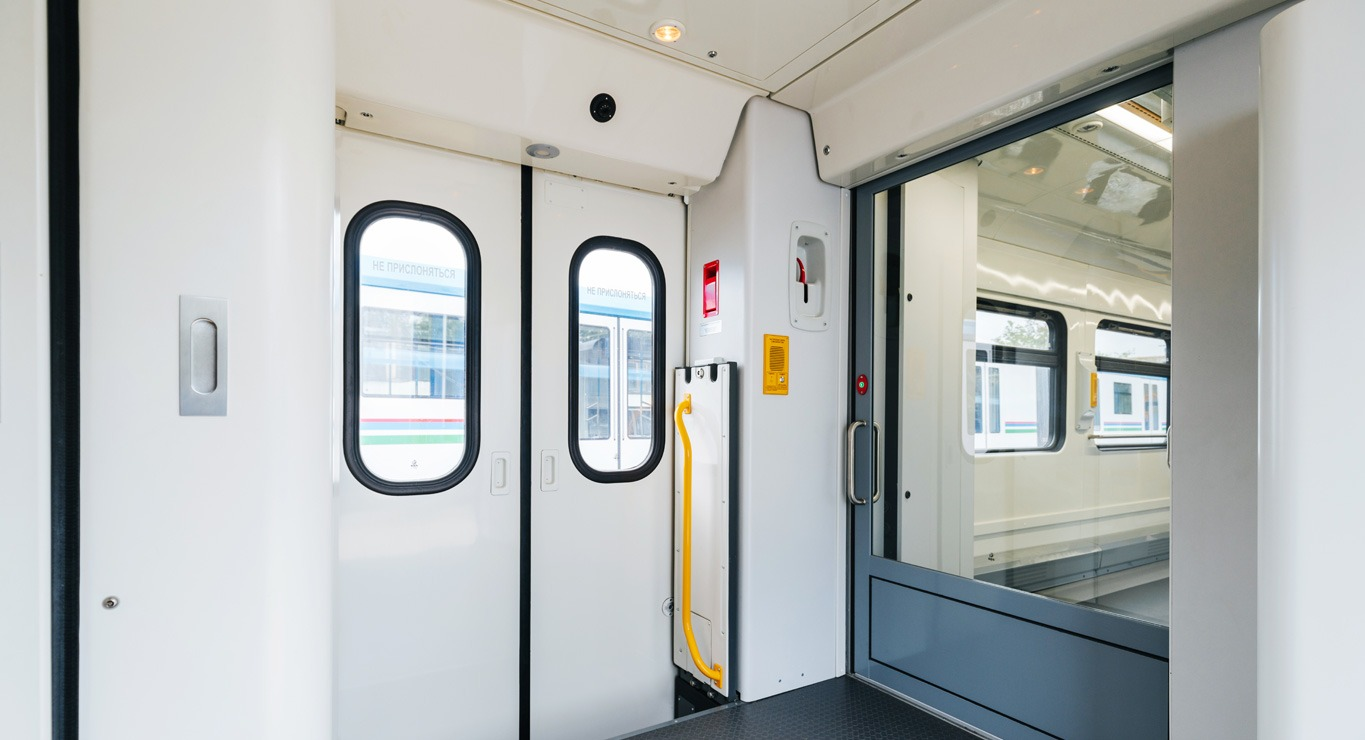
Vestibule of car model 753.11 with white end walls, view back at an angle

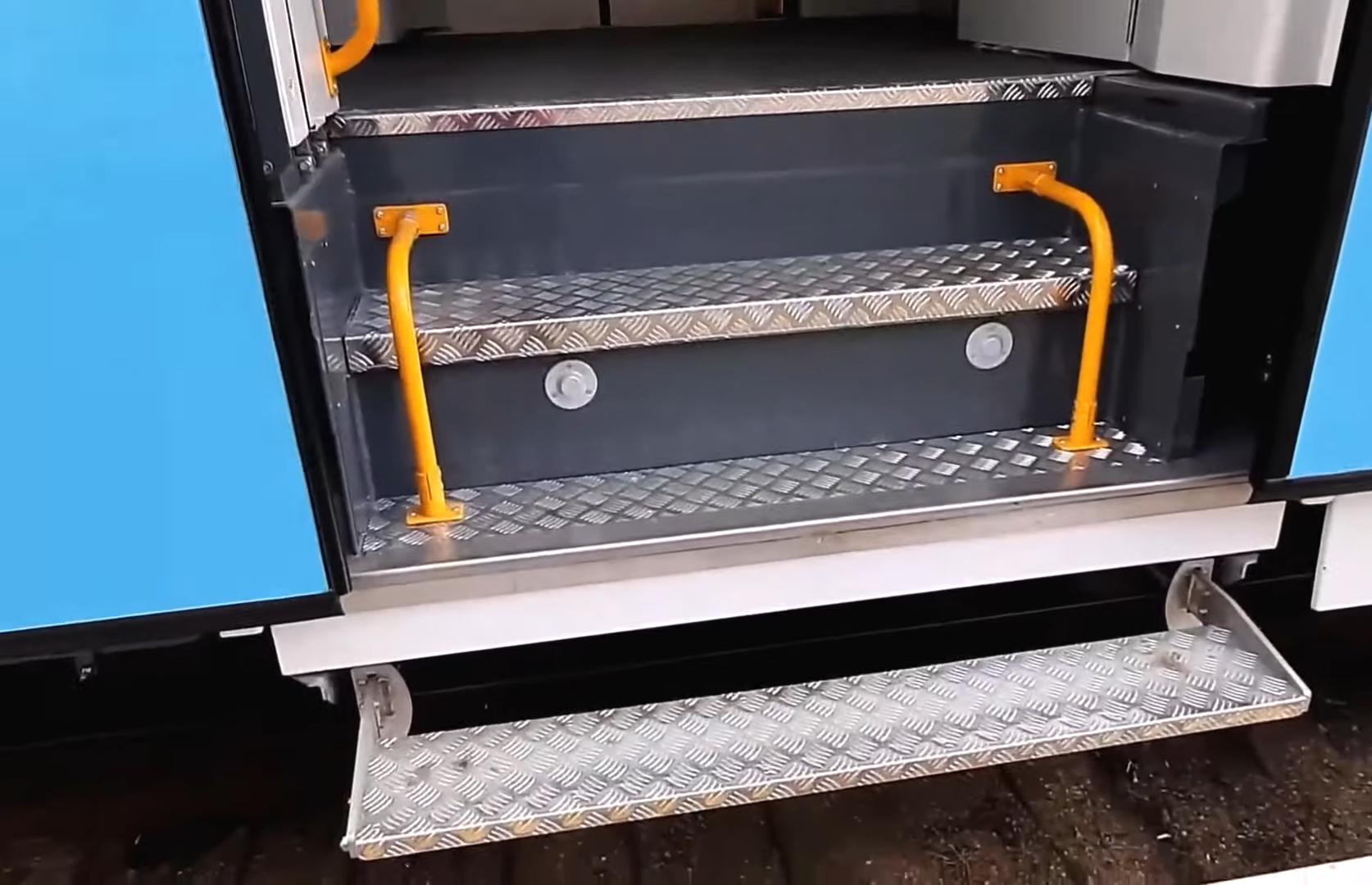
An open retractable step and two fixed inner steps of the vestibule. The lamps are visible on the lower inner step.

The restroom units are located at the back of the head cars on the vestibule side along the left side. They are divided into a toilet cabin and a technical compartment. Entry is from the aisle along the right side. Near the restroom entry door, there are status indicators ("Toilet Occupied" / "Toilet Free"). These indicators are signal panels from the aforementioned EAO AG series 57. In the 753.10 model car, the toilet cabin is narrow and has a swinging door; the toilet is positioned opposite the entrance, and the sink is on the right wall. In the 753.11 model car, the toilet cabin is adapted for disabled people: it has a larger area and a sliding door instead of a swinging one, and in front of the door there is an open space for a wheelchair, while the toilet itself is shifted to the left wall, where the sink is located. In the passenger toilet cabins, there is a vacuum-flush toilet, a sink with a faucet, a mirror above the sink, a liquid soap dispenser, a toilet paper holder, a trash bin, a handrail, and clothes hooks. Flush buttons and an emergency call button for the driver are on the wall. The restroom is equipped with an exhaust fan, a liquid heating radiator, and a ceiling light. In the 753.10 model car, behind the restroom block, there is a service room.

Restrooms

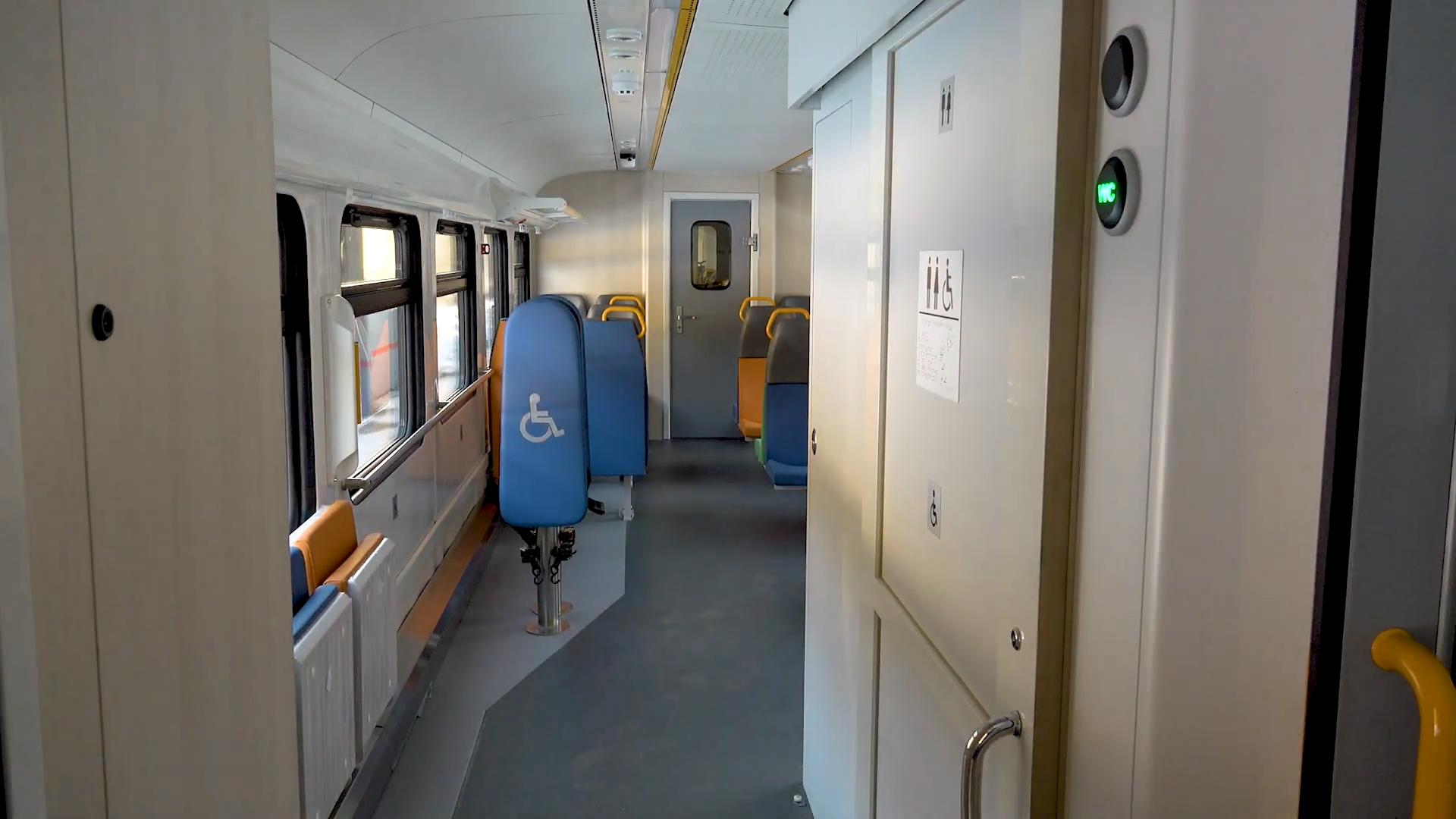
Sliding door of the restroom in car model 753.11

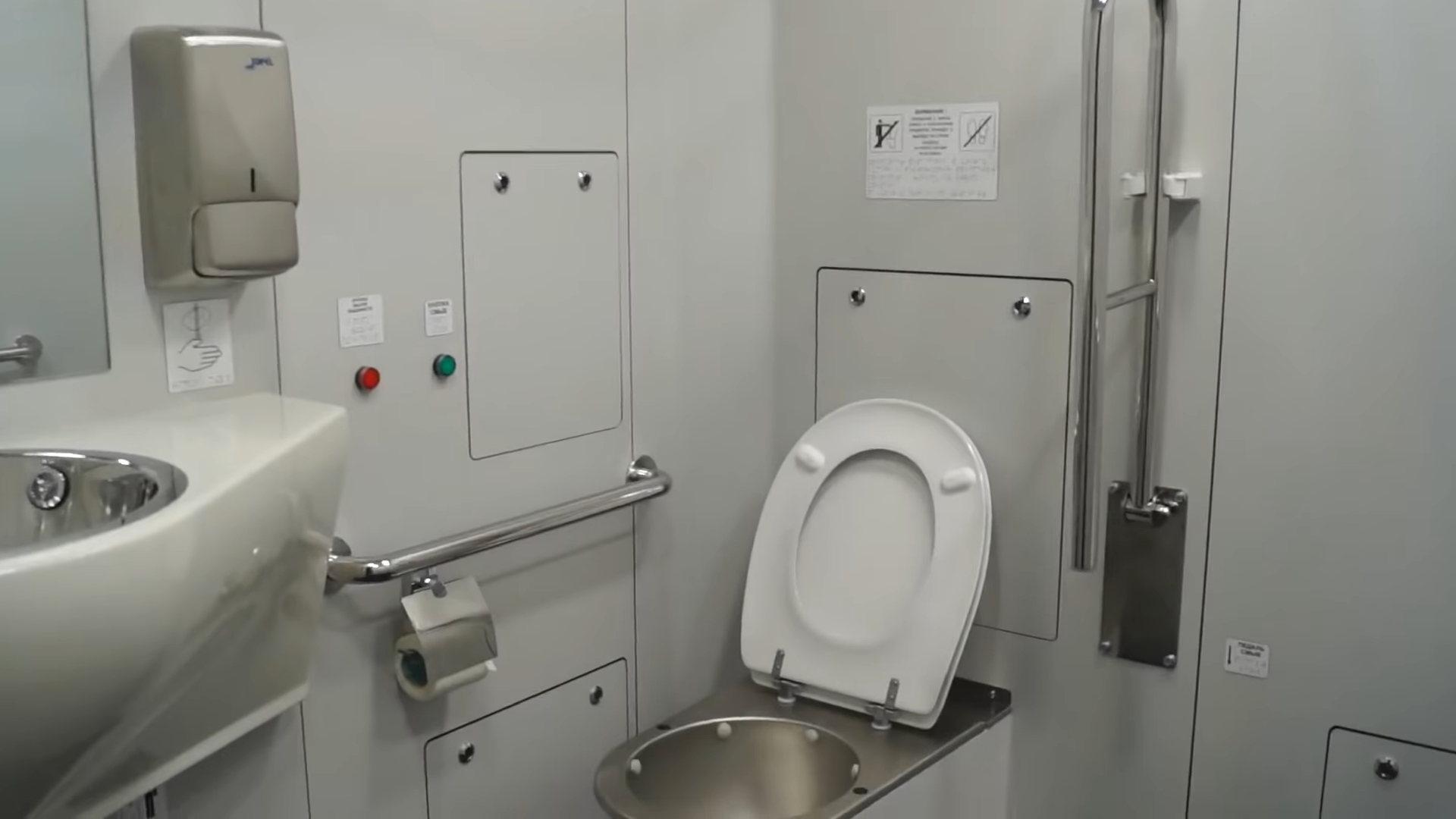
Wide sanitary unit in car model 753.11

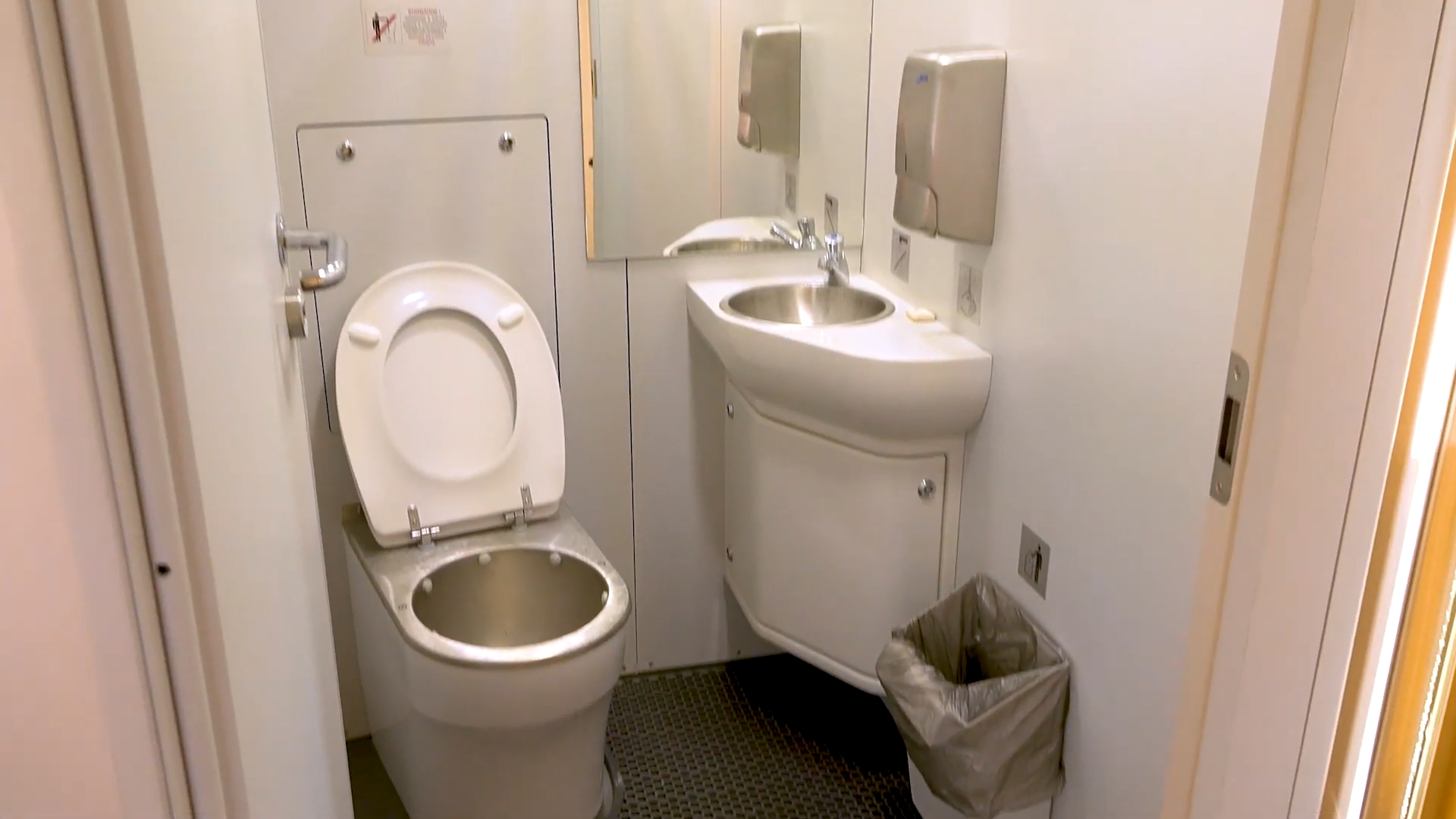
Narrow bathroom in car model 753.10

===== Electrical systems and air conditioning systems =====
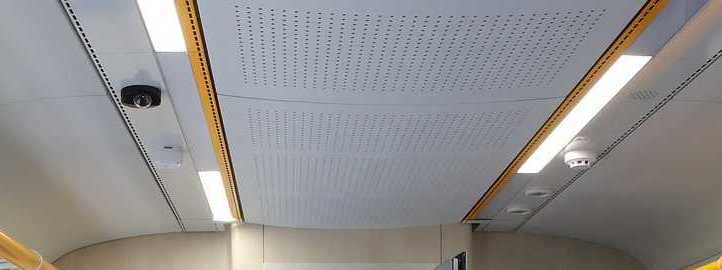
Cabin ceiling equipment. Ventilation openings are visible in the central part of the ceiling, with LED light strips along the edges (some of the lights are off). On the left line, there's a surveillance camera (black in the foreground) and a flame detector (white in the middle), while on the right line, there's a speaker (grill in the foreground), a smoke detector (in the middle), and a pair of emergency lights (in the background).

On the dividing lines of the ceiling in the main part of the cabin, there are two types of light fixtures designed for operation at a voltage of 110 V. The primary cabin work lighting fixtures are in the form of two longitudinal light lines with built-in power saving LEDs and occupy half of the ceiling dividing lines on the inner side. On the outer side of the light lines, round emergency lights HB03 with 15 W incandescent lamps each are installed in pairs along the lines, alternating in a zigzag pattern on the left and right lines. In the head car, there are eight such lights in the front (four on the left and four on the right) and ten in the rear part of the cabin (four on the left and six on the right), while in the intermediate car there are 24 (six on the left and six on the right in each half of the cabin). The lights are used when the main lighting circuits aren't operational. Similar lights are also installed in the service compartment of car 753.10 (two lights), in the vestibules with ten in each (two above the entrance area and three above the passage on each side), as well as two above the passage from the vestibule into the passenger compartment in the intermediate car. Additionally, two lights are installed on the lower fixed step of the vestibule, and above the vestibule doors there is a signal lamp that flashes when the doors are opened and closed. In the toilets, a vandal-proof lamp "Omega C30/24DC" with a voltage of 24 V is installed.

The car is equipped with surveillance camera systems, fire alarm systems, and automatic fire extinguishing systems. In the main sections of the car, two surveillance cameras are installed in each section (four per car), positioned along the longitudinal dividing lines of the ceiling at a distance slightly more than one window from the nearest end wall or the wall of the sanitation unit: the camera on the left line is placed at the front and faces backward, while the camera on the right line is at the rear and faces forward. In the passenger vestibules, two surveillance cameras are installed, one above each entrance door opening. Fire detectors in the main part of the passenger compartment are also installed on the dividing lines of the ceiling at a distance of less than one window from the end walls: in each section of the compartment, fire detectors are located on the left line at the front and on the right at the rear, and opposite them symmetrically — smoke detectors. Additionally, two smoke detectors are installed in the vestibules (left and right between the light fixtures), and one each in the sanitary unit and service room of car 753.10.

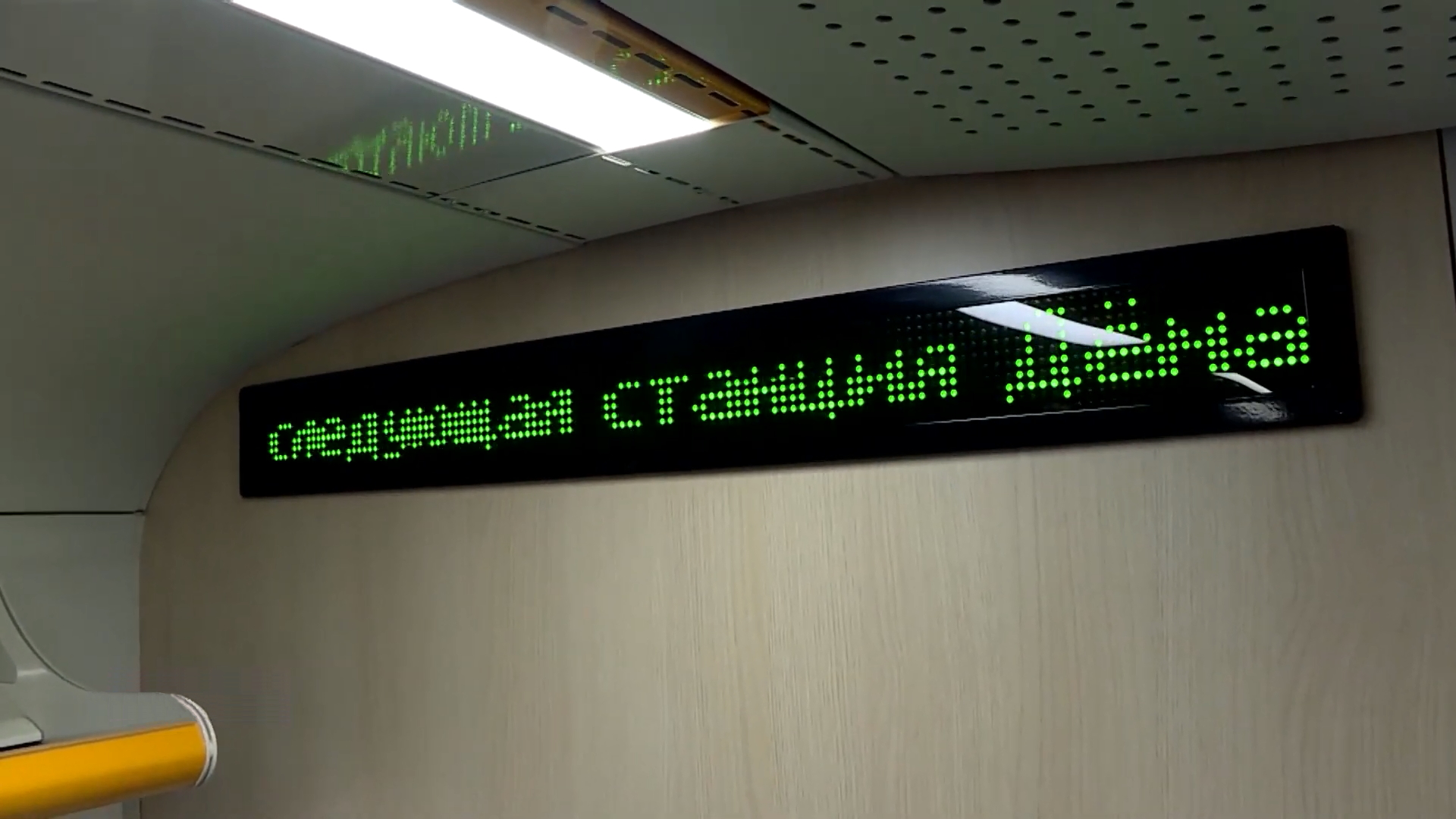
An information display of the "scrolling text" type at the back of the head car's cabin

To provide passengers with text information about proceeding station along the route, the current date and time, and advertising information, electronic display boards of the “scrolling text” type are installed on the end partitions under the ceiling as part of the CIK-RA3 information system. Each car has two screens: in the head car, the screen is located in the center of the partition above the passageway to the passenger vestibule at the front of the car, and on the back wall of the restroom area at the rear; in intermediate cars, the screens are above the passageway in the center of the car on both sides of the central partition. For audio information, loudspeakers are installed in the cars along the ceiling lines opposite the video cameras, with two speakers for each section of the car. For emergency communication with the driver, yellow panels with a call button are provided. In the head cars, they are located on the right side of the wall of the technical cabinet at the entrance to the front cabin and between the first and second windows of the rear cabin, and in the 753.11 model car, there is also an additional panel in the vestibule to the right of the right door. In the intermediate cars, these panels are on the partition in the middle of the cabin on both sides.

The passenger cabin is connected to a climate control system (with ventilation, cooling, and heating functions) that operates in a mode to maintain set temperature parameters. The air conditioning units are located on the roof of the car. This system works together with an air sterilization system. The cabin is heated by liquid-air type heating units. Air ducts are laid along the sides of the car body to distribute the heated air.

==== Service vestibule ====
Between the passenger compartment and the driver’s cab of the leading car, there is a service vestibule for the train crew, separated from the cab and the passenger compartment by partitions with swinging end doors in the center. For entry and exit, it has single-leaf swinging exterior doors on both sides. The front wall of the service vestibule has two cabinets built in on either side of the gangway to the cabin: on the left is electrical equipment, and on the right is pneumatic equipment. The ceiling of the service vestibule has four built-in round HB03 lights with incandescent bulbs, three CCTV cameras, and two fire smoke detectors.

==== Driver's cab ====
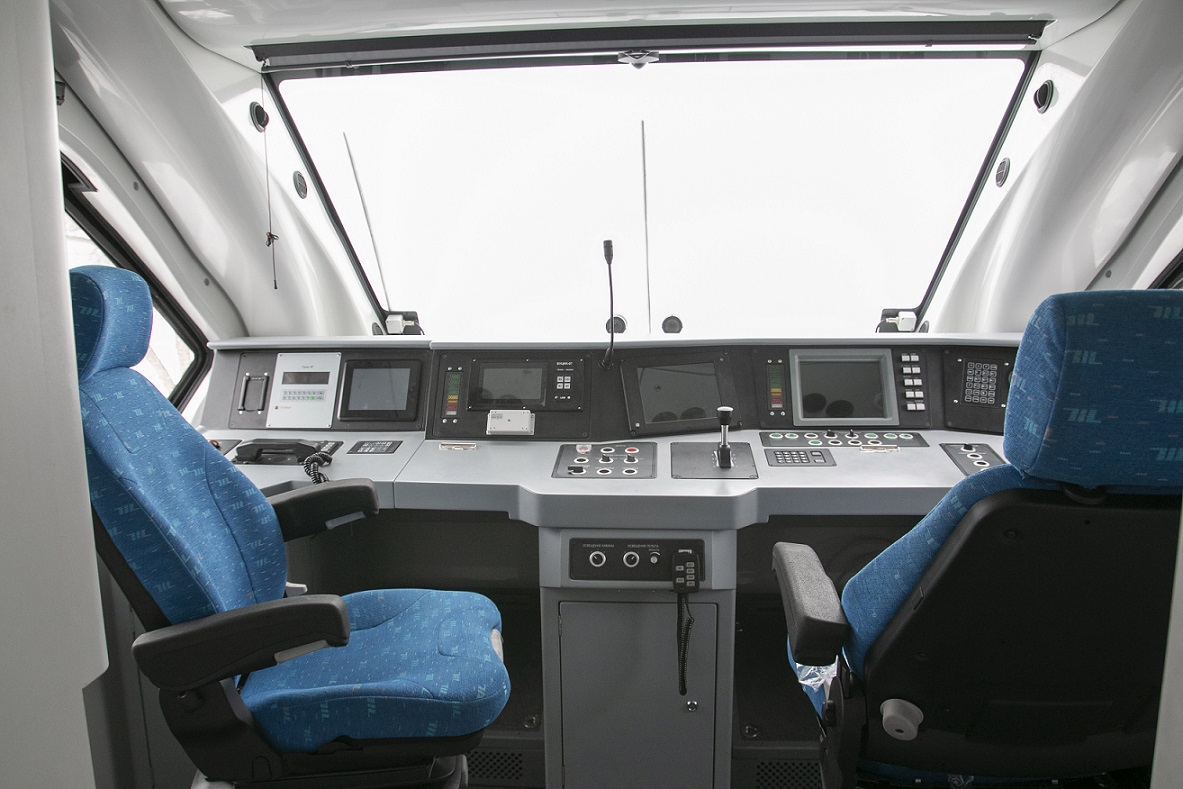
Driver's cab, general view

The driver's cab is located at the front of the leading car and is separated from the service vestibule by a partition with a swing door, with cabinets on the wall on either side of it. At the front of the cab, spanning its entire width, is the control panel with the train's control and monitoring devices. In the central part of the cabin, facing the panel, are the driver’s and assistant driver’s seats (on the right and left, respectively, in the direction of travel), and at the back in the center on the entrance door, there is a folded seat for the instructor driver.

===== Finishing and equipment =====
The walls and ceiling of the cab are milky white and made of fire-resistant fiberglass, while the floor is made of hard-to-burn plywood and covered with gray linoleum. The control panel has a metal frame and is lined with gray fiberglass panels with black control panels.

The glazing set for the RA3 cab consists of a windshield and right and left side windows. Both the windshield and the outer side windows have electric heating. The windshield is a high-strength panoramic triplex made of sheet silicate glass, measuring 1.5 m in height and 2.3 m in length. The side windows are made of two parts, each with its own glass — a fixed front part with a slanted curved upper section and a rear part as a sliding vent, equipped with a locking mechanism (can be in open or closed positions). Above the front and side windows, there are retractable sunshades to protect the driver's eyes from bright sunlight. On the front window's dashboard, in the center (on the control panel housing), there are two navigation cameras: the "KVARTS-M2" system and the SVN system (on the left and right respectively when the cab is moving forward), and above the front window, there's a camera monitoring the area in front of the automatic coupler, angled downward.

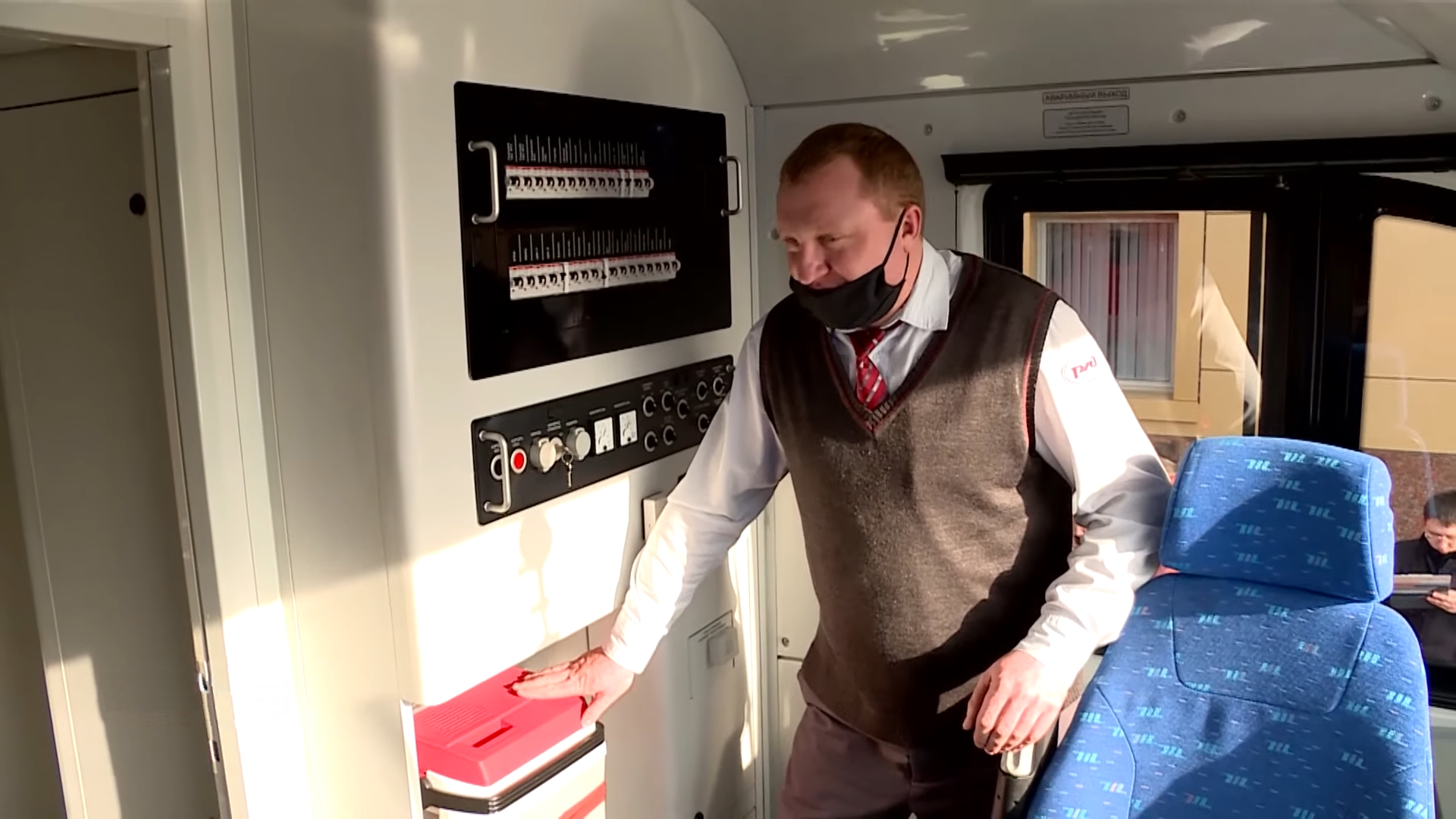
View of the control cabinet on the rear wall of the cabin on the left side. A refrigerator is installed in the cabinet niche.

On the back wall of the cab, to the left behind the assistant driver's seat, there is an electrical cabinet with controls for auxiliary systems and equipment. In the lower part of the cabinet, in a special niche, there is a refrigerator (in the cabin of one car) or a microwave (in the cabin of another car), as well as lockable compartments for cleaning supplies and the personal belongings of the locomotive crew. On the right on the back wall behind the driver's seat, there is a locker for the locomotive crew's clothes with hangers, which also has shelves for personal items, tools, and a first aid kit. Above it, there are loudspeakers and a signal display for the control unit. In the back right corner of the cab, there are fire extinguishers.

On the ceiling of the driver's cab, there are ventilation grilles, a module of the driver's alertness control telemechanics system TSKBM-KP, which receives a radio signal from the driver's wearable bracelet about their condition and sends information to the safety system, seven round ceiling lights HB03 for cab lighting (three in the center, two on each side), two surveillance cameras covering the control panel (on the left — KVARTS-M2 system, on the right — SVN system), and one smoke and flame fire detector each.

The driver’s and assistant driver’s seats have soft cushions and angled backrests with headrests, foldable adjustable armrests, and a pneumatic suspension system. They’re mounted on a slanted base and have adjustments for backrest angle, seat cushion, lumbar support, headrest height, seat height from the floor, and horizontal seat slide, and they can also swivel with fixed forward positions and a 120° turn. The upholstery of the seats and the fold-down seat for the instructor driver is blue.

For the comfort of the locomotive crew, the cabin is equipped with a climate control system with ventilation, air conditioning, heating, and air purification functions. The cabin's heating system is similar to the one installed in a passenger car. The heating units are located in the footrests of the control panel.

===== Remote and control panels =====
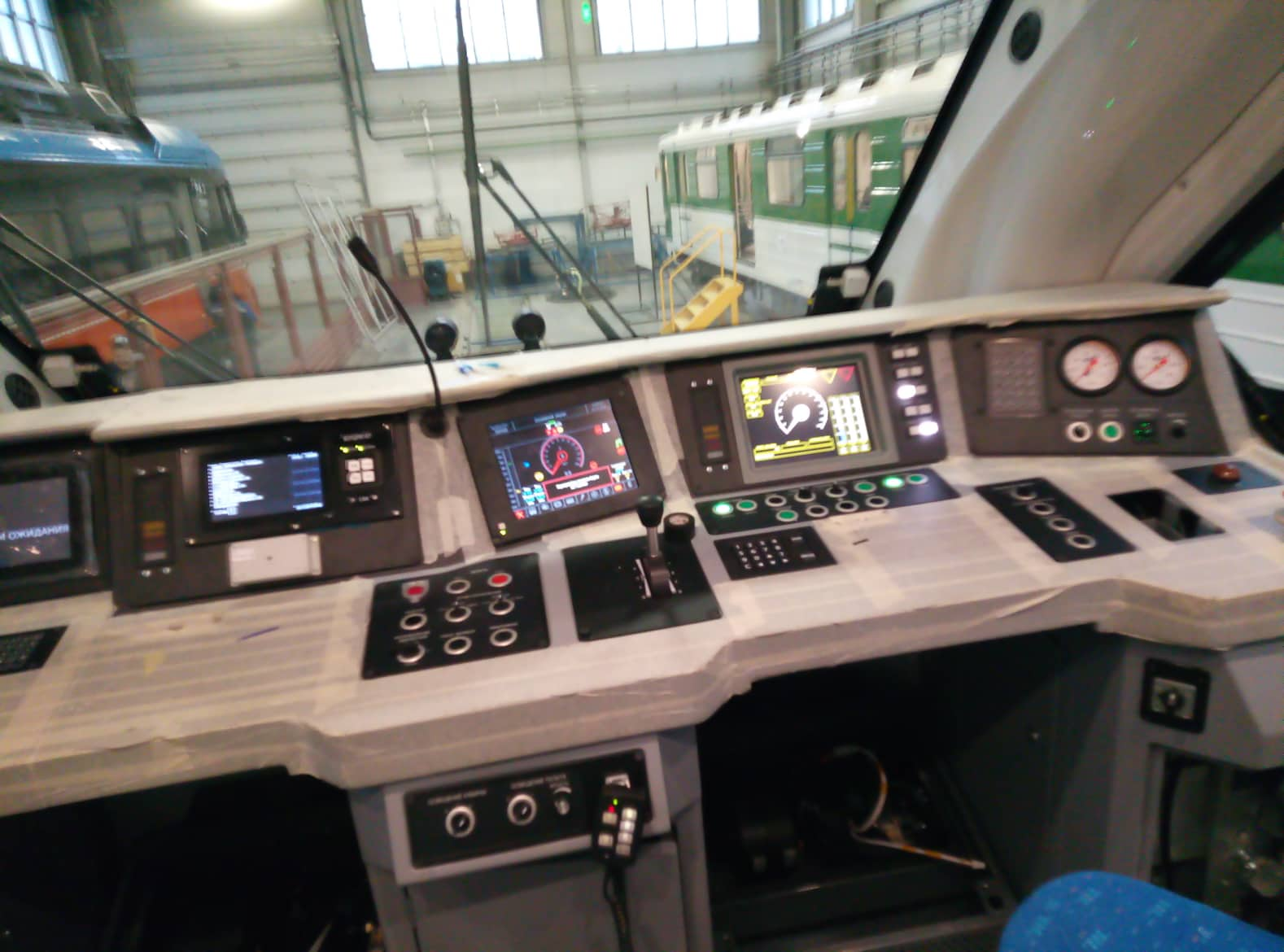
Driver's control panel, general view

The control panel is placed on three pedestals with doors that open and is basically a countertop with a horizontal and inclined part, where the instrument panels are located. In front of the driver's seats, the horizontal part of the panel has small cutouts. The inclined part mainly holds information displays, indicator and control units, and some switches, while the horizontal part in the operational access area has the main controls and switches. All the necessary controls, displays, and indicators are on the right side of the panel within the driver's reach, and in the assistant's reach, there are duplicate instruments. The panel has lighting with adjustable brightness. Inside the top part of the panel, there’s a power supply and fire alarms, inside the left and middle pedestals are the electronic control system units, and inside the right pedestal are elements of the pneumatic braking system.

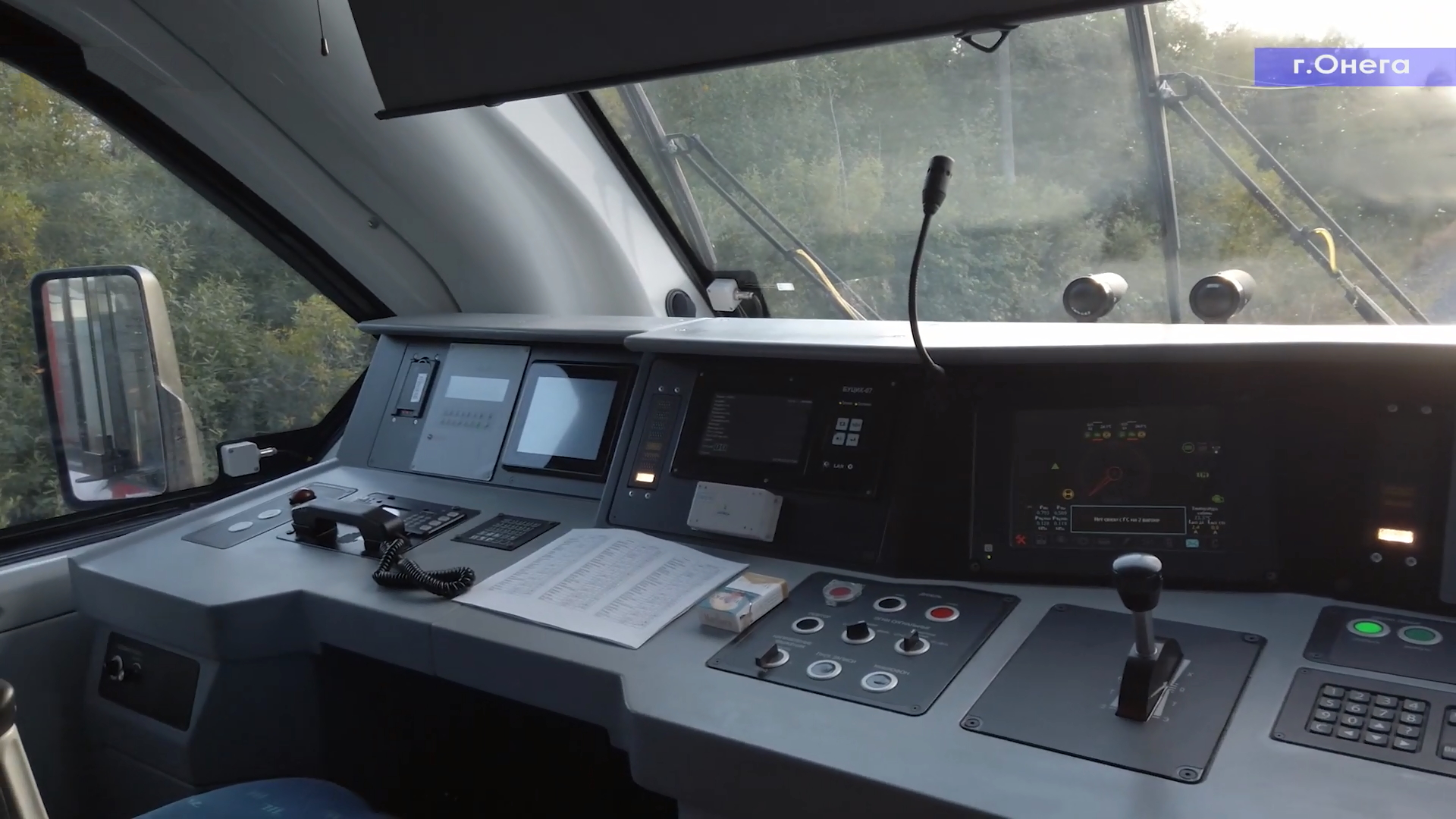
The control panel is on the left side in the assistant driver's area

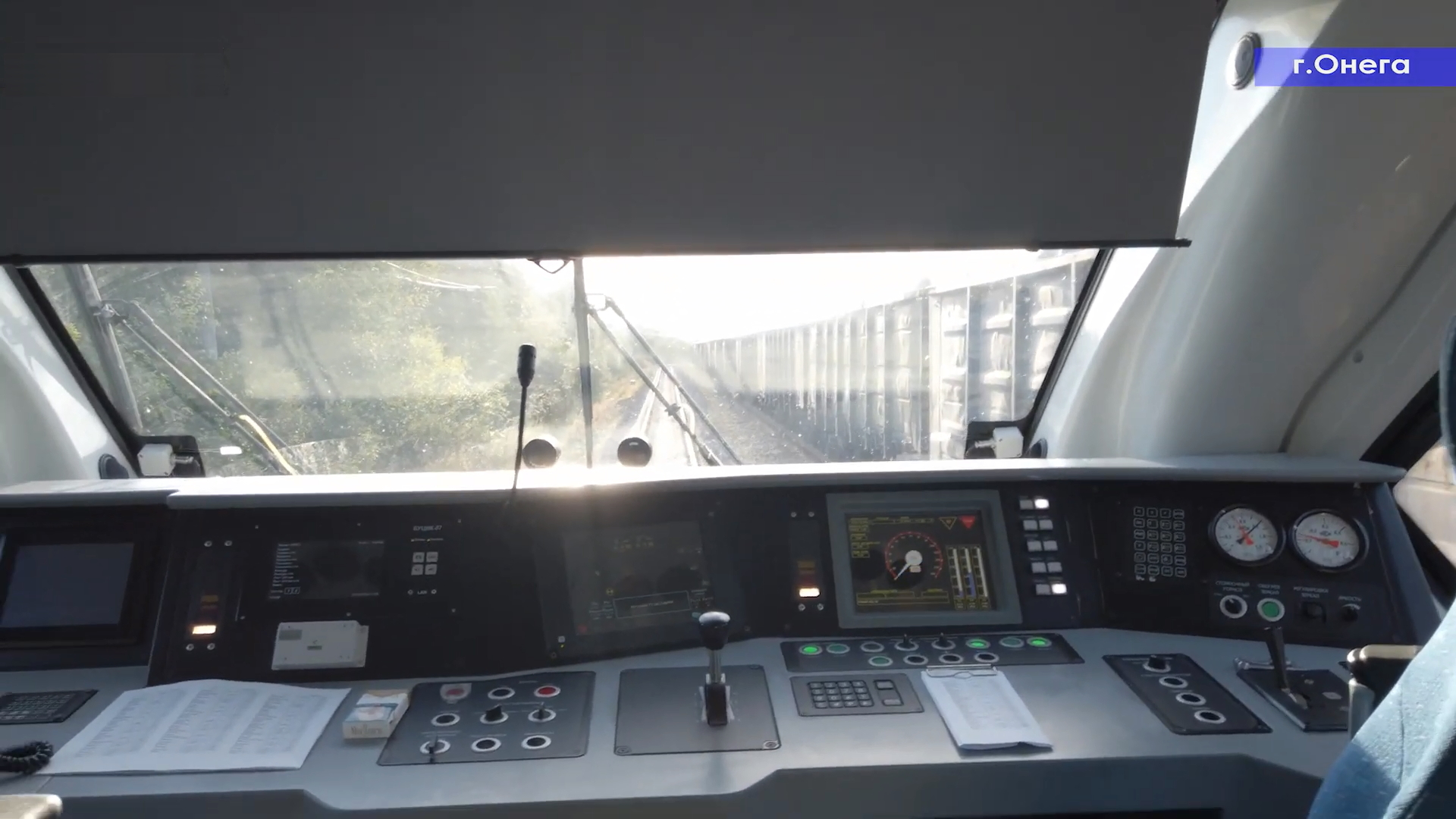
Control panel on the right side in the driver's area

The upper slanted part of the control panel on the left side (in the driver's assistant's area) is divided in half into two display and control blocks, with the right block sticking out forward closer to the edge of the panel, while on the right side (in the driver's area) there are three blocks, with the left and right blocks angled inward toward the central block, forming a recess in front of it. On these blocks, from left to right, the following instruments are located:

- On the left side of the assistant driver’s console (BI-1) — a connector for installing the removable media of the BLOK-M safety system, the main controller panel for the KTS-POS fire protection system with a small display and buttons, and a monitor for the video surveillance system (SVN);
- On the right assistant driver’s panel (BI-2) — a signal lamp module for the traffic light with vertically arranged signal lamps along the left edge, a microphone amplifier from the QUARTZ-M2 set at the bottom center, and the digital information system control unit BUCIC-07 on the remaining area;
- on the left driver’s console (BI-3) — an external microphone from the CIK-RA3 set near the left edge and the MFDU-K multifunction display of the SKIF-RA control system;
- On the central unit of the BI-4 driver’s console — there’s a signal module for the traffic light along the left edge, a monitor of the BLOCK-M locomotive safety complex taking up most of the space, and a module of signal indicators along the right edge in the form of colored lights that indicate door closure control, battery and power unit malfunctions, axle overheating, brake release, and active cab;
- On the driver's right console (BI-5) — the input module (keyboard) of the BLOK-M system at the top left, two pneumatic dual-needle gauges to monitor the pressure in the brake and main lines and in the brake cylinders of the drive bogie (top right), as well as the parking brake switch, mirror heater switch, joystick for adjusting the mirrors, and the brightness control for the gauge backlighting.

On the horizontal control panel countertop, the following control devices are arranged from left to right:

- On the left in the assistant driver's area (under the BI-1 unit) — a narrow control panel PU-3 with buttons for the assistant's vigilance handle, typhon and whistle, a radio with a handset, and a video surveillance system keyboard;
- On the right, in the assistant driver's area (under the BI-2 unit) — an empty space for route documentation with a holder;
- In the center between the assistant driver's and driver's zones (under the BI-2 and BI-3 units) is the PU-1 control panel, which has in the top row buttons for activating emergency control, starting, and stopping the diesel engines; in the middle row, a button for repeating the confirmation of the fire alarm and two rotary switches for signal lights in different modes; and in the bottom row, a rotary reverser with positions 'Forward,' '0,' 'Reverse,' as well as buttons for turning on recording and the microphone.
- to the left of the driver (under the BI-3 unit) — the controller handle, which can be turned forward and backward in a vertical plane;
- In the center in the distance (under the BI-4 block) is the wide PU-4 control panel. On its top row, on the far left and right, there are pairs of buttons for opening and closing the left and right doors. Between them, from left to right, are the button for supplying PAK, rotary switches for the spotlight and interior lighting, and the button to activate the mode for extending external steps when the doors are opened. On the bottom row, there’s the button for automatic speed maintenance (turning on automatic speed mode, selecting the current speed, increasing, and decreasing the selected speed);
- In the center nearby (under the PU-4 panel) — a Pult-K keyboard for navigating the SKIF-RA control system display menu in the top left corner and empty space for route documents with a holder on the right;
- To the right of the driver (under the BI-5 unit) is a narrow control panel PU-2 with a rotary switch for the windshield wipers, buttons for turning on the windshield washers, the horn and whistle, a handle for the backup brake control that can be tilted forward and back in a vertical plane, a driver vigilance handle button (brown) and an emergency brake button (red).

On the left console under the control panel countertop, there is an additional PU-5 control panel with a control lighting switch and brightness regulator, and in the middle – a PU-6 control panel with similar instruments in the center, a cabin lighting switch on the left, and an extra radio control for the driver on the right. Under the countertop, there are 'Alarm' safety buttons (in the driver and assistant driver zones). Below, between the consoles, there are inclined footrests for the driver and assistant driver, and on the driver’s side, there is a pneumatic Typhon pedal.

Additionally to the control panel, the instrument panels are also built into the body of the control cabinet, located on the left side of the rear wall. At the top is the protection and switching unit, which houses the electrical circuit breakers for the control circuits. Below it is the control panel, featuring buttons for turning the onboard power on and off, switching control to the opposite cabin, the emergency control switch with a key, a battery boost button from an adjacent car, voltmeters for the 24V and 110V circuits, rotary switches for trolley lighting, diesel heater, passenger cabin climate control system, ventilation, heating, air conditioning in the cabin, and its temperature regulator. Below that is the panel for the IGLA-M.5K-T.U fire detection and suppression system, along with a sealed fire control system panel.

The cab uses control panels made in Russia (LLC "NT Kontakt", Saint Petersburg).

== Service ==
=== Assignment and routes ===
External image
- Транспортировка РА3 для Крыма (+видео)

In summer 2019, RA3 multiple units numbered 024–026 arrived in Sakhalin. On 30 August, RA3-024 had its presentation run, and on 1 September, passenger service began on the Tomari–Kholmsk (with a partial option Chekhov-Sakhalinsky–Kholmsk), Yuzhno-Sakhalinsk–Tomari, Yuzhno-Sakhalinsk–Korsakov, and Yuzhno-Sakhalinsk–Dalneye routes. The Yuzhno-Sakhalinsk–Dalneye route is similar to Aeroexpress routes due to its connection to the local airport with Korsakov and the village of Dalneye. In November 2020, three more RA3 multiple units numbered 044–046 arrived in Sakhalin, equipped with soft second class seats. Since December 2020, the new higher-comfort multiple units have been operating together with the earlier RA3 multiple units on the Yuzhno-Sakhalinsk–Tomari route. Since 1 February 2021, they have been servicing the Yuzhno-Sakhalinsk–Korsakov suburban route and the new Yuzhno-Sakhalinsk — Poronaysk express route. Starting on 1 May 2021, for the summer period on weekends and holidays, some trips on the Tomari–Kholmsk route were extended to the Chyortov Most station (75 km) and to the previous station at 77 km, as well as partial routes to the new above-mentioned stations from Chekhov were introduced.

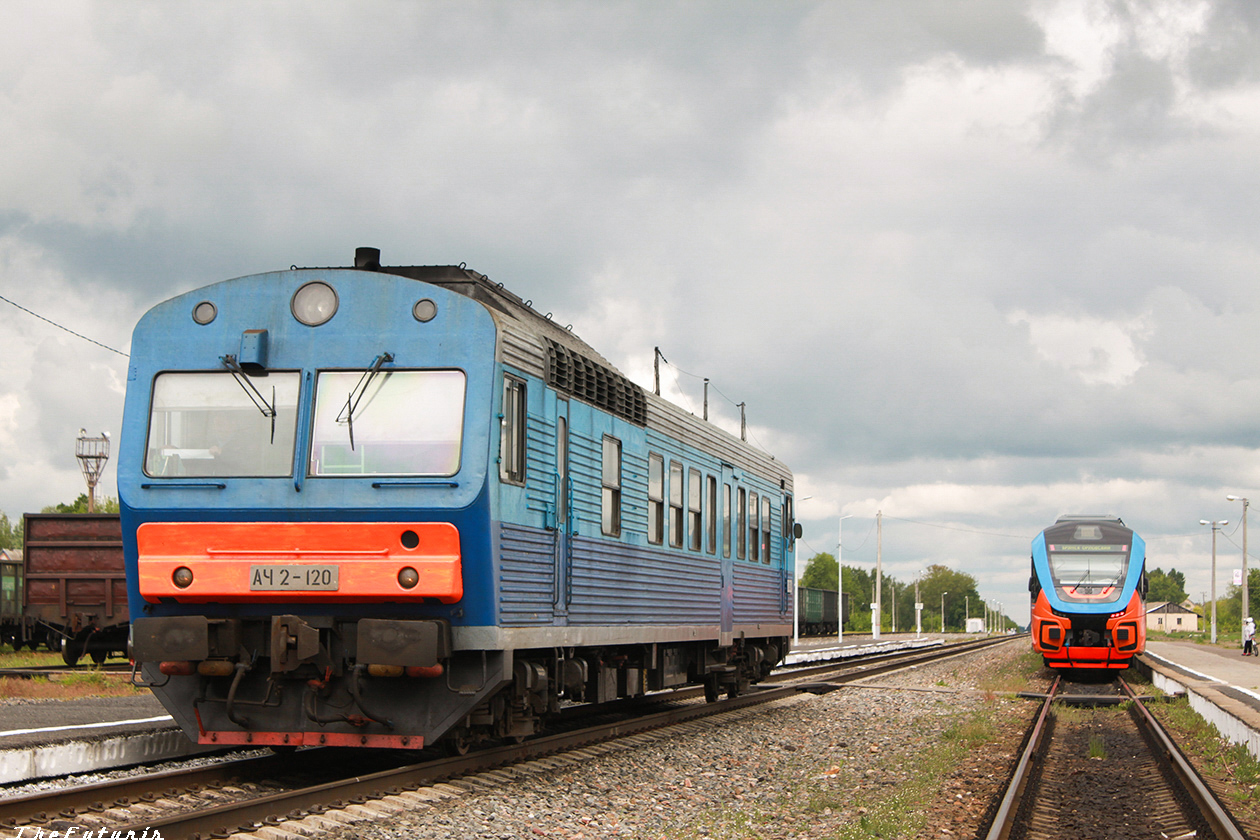
ACh2-120 railcar on the penultimate day of its service and its successor RA3-017 at Komarichi station (Bryansk region) in 27 May 2020

In late August 2019, a RA3-005 multiple unit for CPPC was unveiled at the PRO//Dvizhenie. Expo at the experimental ring depot of VNIIZhT in Shcherbinka. Also on 30 August 2019, the first delivery of RA3 multiple units for CPPC was made consisting of two 2-car sets. In October the same year, CPPC put the multiple units into service on the Bryansk-Orlovsky–Oryol route, and shortly after on other non-electrified suburban routes of the Bryansk railway hub, such as Bryansk-Orlovsky–Komarichi, Bryansk-Orlovsky–Fayansovaya (including a partial Bryansk–Dyatkovo route), Bryansk-Orlovsky–Novozybkov (including partial routes Bryansk–Pochep, Bryansk–Unecha, Pochep–Unecha–Novozybkov), as well as on the Oryol–Livny section with partial routes Oryol–Verkhovye and Oryol–Mikhaylovsky Mine routes. On these routes, RA3 multiple units have mostly replaced ACh2 railcars with APCh2 cars, which were completely withdrawn from passenger service at the Bryansk hub in mid-2020 due to the end of their service life (only in service ACh2-045 remained at the Bryansk depot TCh-45), either withdrawn or transferred to other depots, and they also partially pushed out RA2 trains, which were moved to other routes. Since December 2019, one of the fleet by CPPC were operating on the Golutvin–Ozyory route in the Moscow region, where it replaced the DP-M diesel multiple unit.

Arrival of the multiple unit RA3-029 from Izhevsk to Glazov at Zavodskaya station

In 2020, the geographic spread of RA3 multiple units expanded significantly, and began replacing locomotive-hauled trains with attached passenger cars on suburban routes. From January to February 2020, three multiple units, 032–034, started operating on the Gorky Railway in Udmurtia on the routes Izhevsk — Balezino — Glazov, Izhevsk — Uva, and Izhevsk — Nizhnekamsk; one multiple unit numbered 031, in Vladimir Oblast on the route Kovrov — Murom; and three more multiple units numbered 027, 028, and 030 in Rostov Oblast on the route Rostov-Glavny — Volgodonskaya on the North Caucasus Railway and the branches Rostov-Glavny — Salsk and Rostov-Glavny — Kuberle. In mid-2021, multiple unit numbered 069 arrived in Rostov, and from 3 July on weekends, Rostov RA3 multiple uits began serving the Rostov-Glavny — Yeysk route.

RA3 multiple units service in Crimea and the Rostov region. Cabin overview

In summer 2020, nine RA3 multiple units numbered 035–043 arrived in Crimea under the ownership of YUPPK and from July started serving the Simferopol — Dzhankoy — Feodosia route, and later also other routes on the Dzhankoy — Kerch lines (both directly and with a branch to Feodosia) and Dzhankoy — Armyansk.

Starting in summer 2020, some RA3 multiple units serving routes in Udmurtia were temporarily transferred to other regions of Russia. In the end of July, RA3-034 was temporarily moved from Udmurtia to the Ivanovo region and began operating the Ivanovo — Kineshma route, and later it was replaced on this route by a multiple unit numbered 047. In September 2020, RA3-029 was temporarily transferred to the Arkhangelsk region and started running on the short city route Arkhangelsk — Solombalka and the longer regional route Arkhangelsk — Onega. In the end of 2020, according to plans, six more multiple units numbered 053—058 were supposed to go to the Arkhangelsk region. By the end of the year, only three multiple units numbered 053–055 were put into service on the routes Arkhangelsk — Siya, Arkhangelsk — Severodvinsk, and Severodvinsk — Nyenoksa. For a while, multiple unit numbered 029 also served the Severodvinsk direction, but by the end of the month it was returned from the Arkhangelsk region to Udmurtia. Plans for the multiple units 057 and 058 were also revised, and they were sent to operate in the Ivanovo region. From January to February 2021, SPPC began implementing a Wi-Fi access system on suburban multiple units to provide passengers with free Internet connection. As of 3 February 2021, this system was installed on four RA3 cars operating in the Arkhangelsk hub. The car with the internet system are marked with special stickers.

RA3 in service of different operators

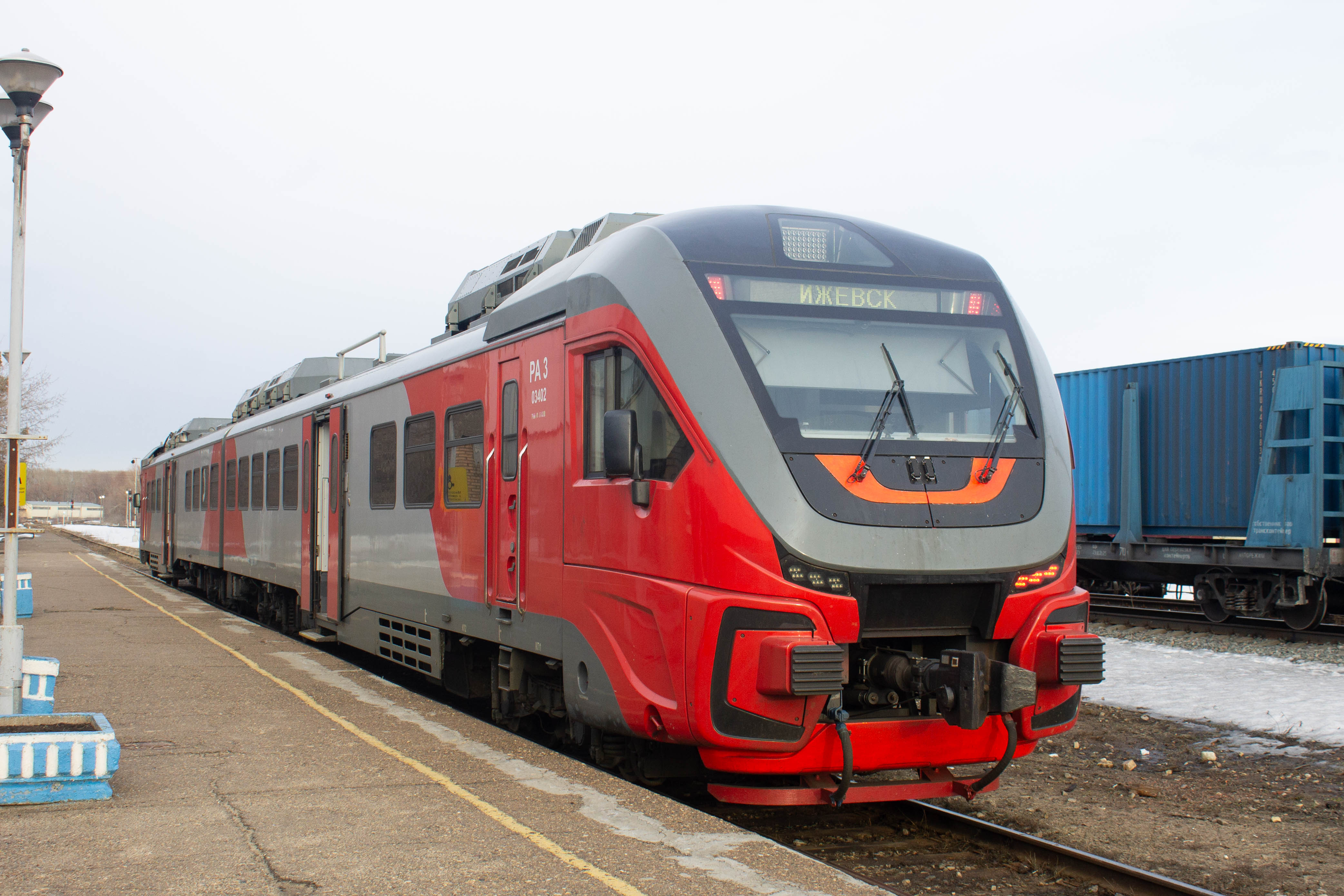
RA3-034 in a 2-car formation at Nizhnekamsk railway station

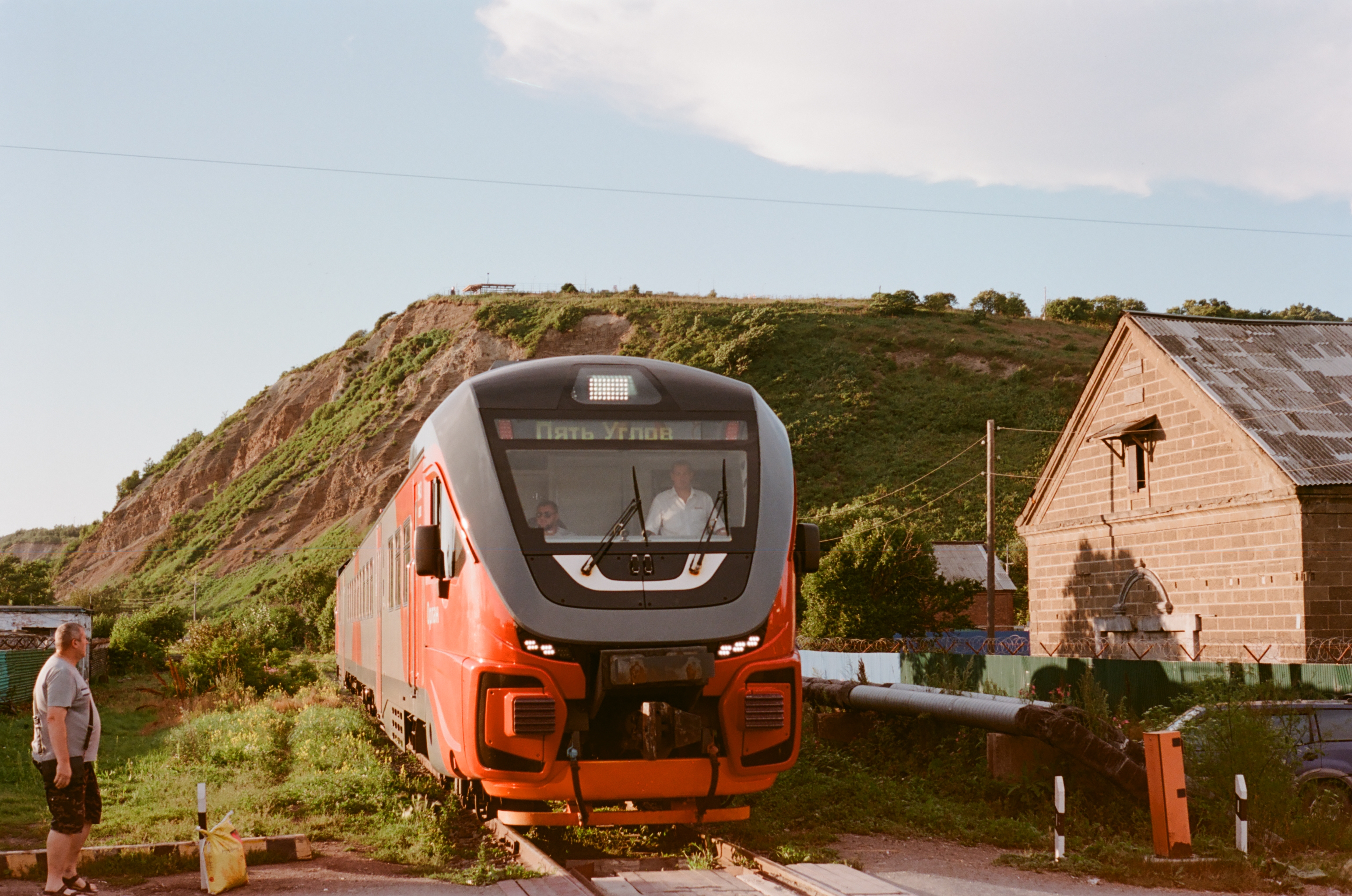
RA3-026 at Korsakov railway station of the Sakhalin region, DVZhD

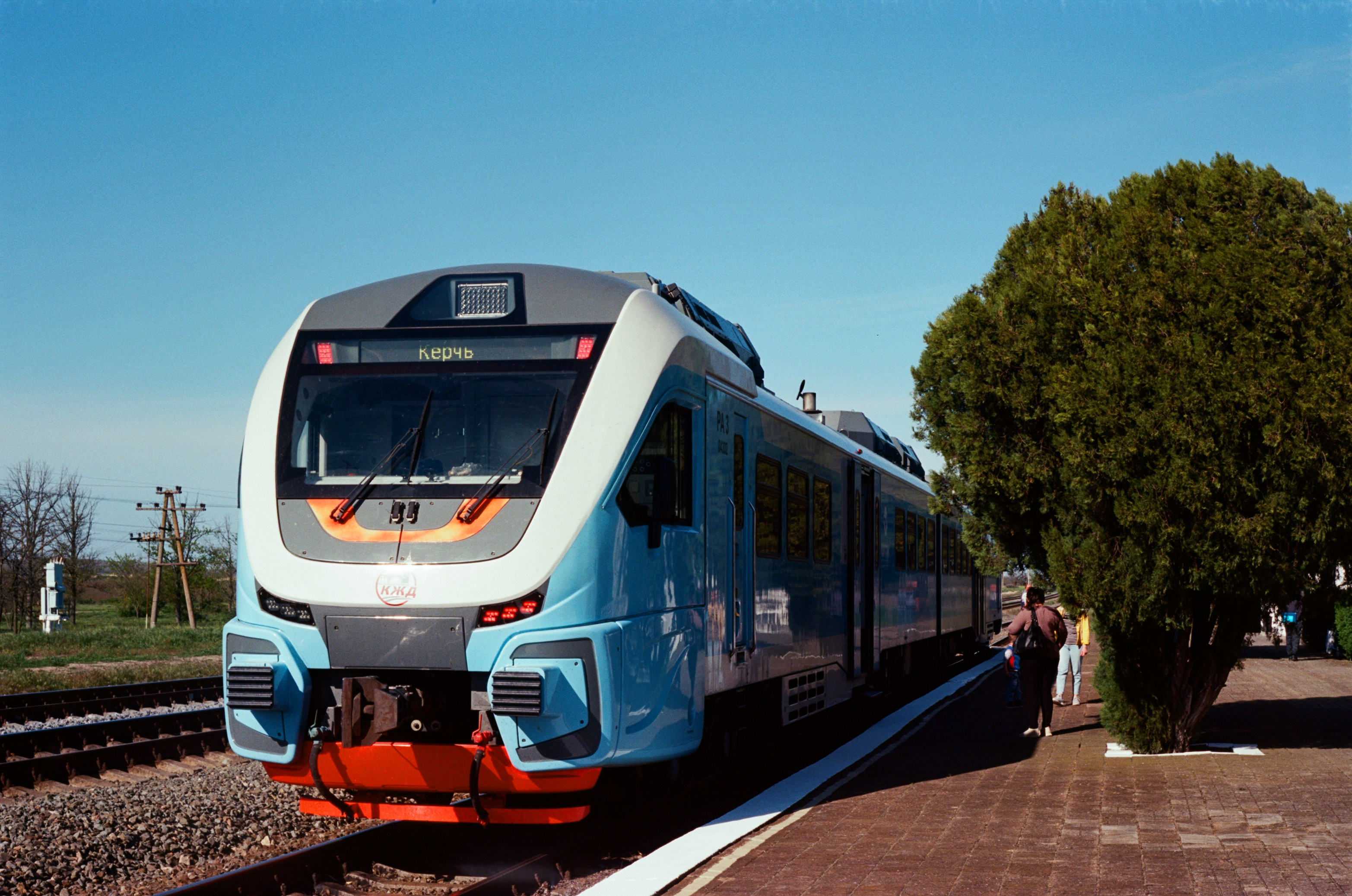
RA3-043 in the white-blue 'YUPPK' livery at Petrovo railway station in Crimea

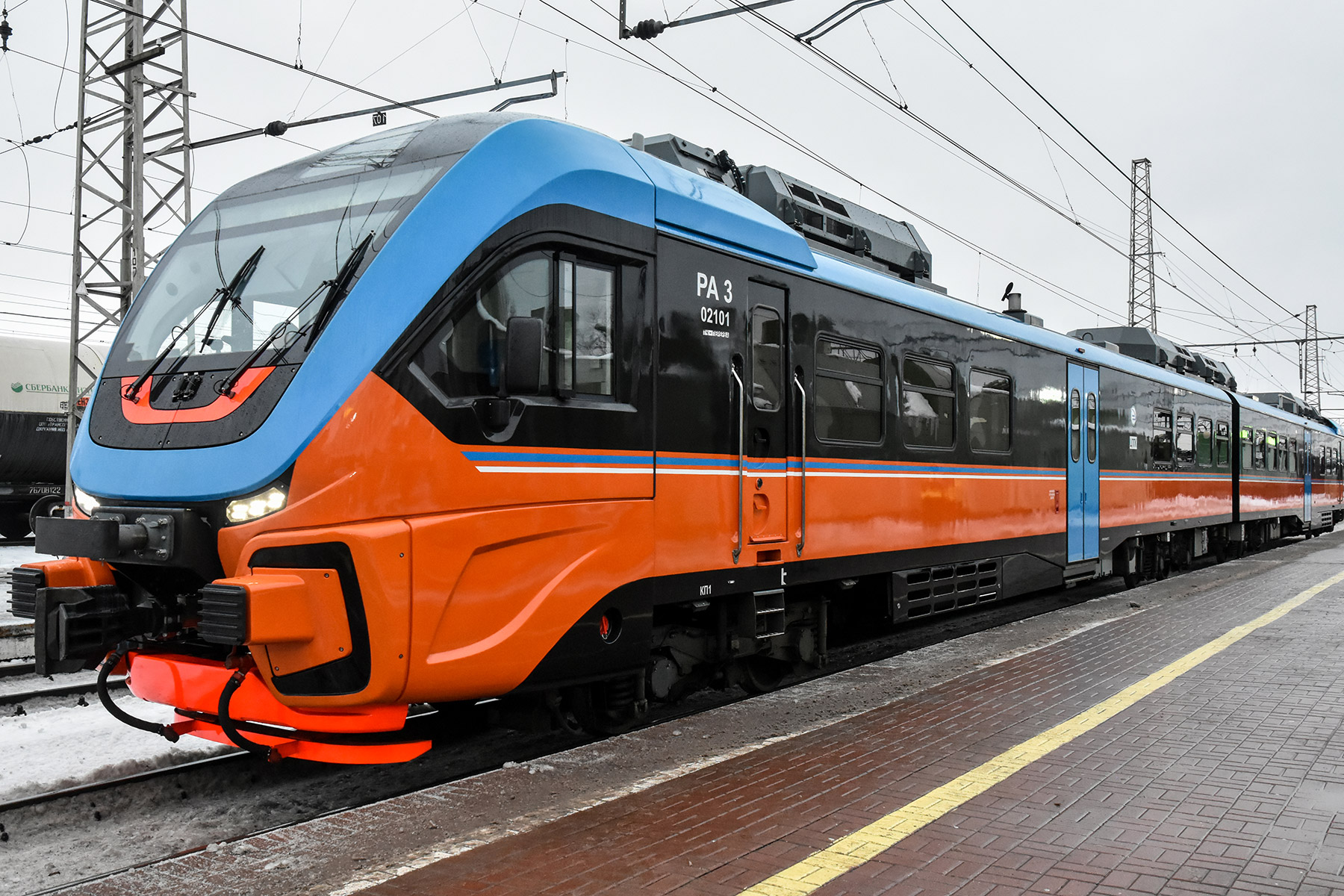
RA3-021 in the blue-orange 'CPPK' livery at Tula's Moscow railway station

Since the beginning of 2021, RA3 multiple units started temporary service on the October Railway in Karelia on the Petrozavodsk — Sortavala route as a tourist train (route number 900), with one of the Udmurt trains also being temporarily transferred. The route ran during the New Year holidays from 2 to 9 January 2021, serviced by a multiple unit numbered 034, and also during long combined holiday weekends in February (serviced by a multiple unit numbered 029) and March. At the end of April 2021, two of the five planned RA3 multiple units had already been permanently introduced on the October Railway (3-car 060 and 2-car 066), and in May, another 3-car 061 was added, assigned to the Saint Petersburg-Baltic depot. The 2-car multiple unit was put into service immediately after arrival, starting to operate the Petrozavodsk — Sortavala route from 1 to 9 May, and soon the testing of the 3-car multiple units began as well. From 29 May 2021, the multiple units were put back into service on the route during the summer on weekends, and starting on 5 June, they began serving a new route Lodeynoye Pole — Sortavala year-round.

In November 2020, four RA3 multiple units numbered 048–051 arrived at the Nizhny Tagil depot of the Sverdlovsk Railway. The first of them made trial runs on the Yekaterinburg — Polevskoy and Perm — Lysva routes. The launch of these multiple units took place in mid-January 2021 on routes around Yekaterinburg (Yekaterinburg — Verkhny Ufaley, Yekaterinburg — Yegorshino, and Tyumen — Tobolsk) and on the Perm — Lysva route. Later, the delivery of four more multiple units is planned, which are expected to run on routes from Nizhny Tagil to Alapaevsk, Serov, and Ivdel.

At the end of 2020, two multiple units numbered 052 and 059 arrived at the Dyoma depot of the Kuybyshev railway for operation in the Republic of Bashkortostan, but later plans for the multiple unit numbered 059 were changed, and it was transferred to the Danilov depot and sent to the Ivanovo region. At the same time, the multiple unit numbered 052 began operating on the Ufa — Novoabzakovo route on holidays and weekends from 2 January 2021, until 28 March 2021, and from 2 April 2021, it began regular express service with a few stops along the Ufa — Kumertau route. According to the plans, three more multiple units of the class were supposed to arrive in Ufa in 2021 (as of May, multiple unit numbered 065 had arrived).

Launch of the RA3-029 multiple unit in Arkhangelsk on the route to Onega. A look inside the passenger car and the cab

Operation of the RA3-048 multiple unit in Nizhny Tagil. A look inside the passenger and driver compartments

RA3-052 multiple unit departure in Ufa on the route to Kumertau. A look at the passenger car and the cab

In January 2021, test runs of the RA3 multiple units began on three new routes in the Ivanovo region, and in early February they were put into passenger service instead of locomotive-hauled trains: from 1 February, the multiple units started operating on the Ivanovo–Kovrov and Ivanovo–Yaroslavl lines, and from 5 February also on the shortened Ivanovo–Nerekhta route, which is part of the line to Yaroslavl. New multiple units numbered 057–059 were used on these routes. Later, from 10 May 2021, the route to Yaroslavl was cancelled, but at the same time additional partial routes such as Ivanovo–Shuya route on the Ivanovo–Kovrov line and Ivanovo–Furmanov route on the Ivanovo–Nerekhta line were introduced, as well as a combined Shuya–Ivanovo–Nerekhta route. A week later, from 17 May, RA3 multiple units also started operating the Ivanovo–Alexandrov line with partial Ivanovo–Teikovo, Teikovo–Gavrilov Posad, Ivanovo–Gavrilov Posad, and Ivanovo–Yuryev-Polsky routes.

Also on 5 February 2021, there was a demonstration run of the RA3-023 multiple unit in the Kursk region on the Kursk–Svoboda section (north of Kursk). After that, the multiple unit was put into regular service on the Kursk–Glushkovo route and its Kursk–Lgov part, replacing the RA2 in the southwest direction. In the second half of February, another multiple unit was planned to be put into service on a different route.

Distribution, assignment and routes of RA3 multiple units
RA3 multiple unit (Russia)
Operator	Subsidiary	Depot	Number of multiple units	Multiple unit numbers	Train route	Validity date	Source
Sakhalin Passenger Company	Far Eastern Railway	TChE-15 Yuzhno-Sakhalinsk	6	024–026, 044–046	Yuzhno-Sakhalinsk–Tomari	from 01.09.2019	
Sakhalin Passenger Company	Far Eastern Railway	TChE-15 Yuzhno-Sakhalinsk	6	024–026, 044–046	Yuzhno-Sakhalinsk–Korsakov	from 01.09.2019	
Sakhalin Passenger Company	Far Eastern Railway	TChE-15 Yuzhno-Sakhalinsk	6	024–026, 044–046	Yuzhno-Sakhalinsk–Dal'nee	from 01.09.2019	
Sakhalin Passenger Company	Far Eastern Railway	TChE-15 Yuzhno-Sakhalinsk	6	024–026, 044–046	Yuzhno-Sakhalinsk–Poronaysk	from 01.02.2021	
Sakhalin Passenger Company	Far Eastern Railway	TChE-15 Yuzhno-Sakhalinsk	6	024–026, 044–046	Tomari–Chekhov–Kholmsk	from 01.09.2019	
Sakhalin Passenger Company	Far Eastern Railway	TChE-15 Yuzhno-Sakhalinsk	6	024–026, 044–046	Tomari–Chekhov–Kholmsk–77 km–Chertov Most (extension)	from 01.05.2021 to autumn 2021	
Central Suburban Passenger Company	Moscow Railway	TC-45 Bryansk-I	23	001–023	Bryansk-Orlovsky–Oryol	from 10.2019	
Central Suburban Passenger Company	Moscow Railway	TC-45 Bryansk-I	23	001–023	Bryansk-Orlovsky–Komarichi	from 10.2019	
Central Suburban Passenger Company	Moscow Railway	TC-45 Bryansk-I	23	001–023	Bryansk-Orlovsky–Dyatkovo–Fayansovaya	from 10.2019	
Central Suburban Passenger Company	Moscow Railway	TC-45 Bryansk-I	23	001–023	Bryansk-Orlovsky–Pochep–Unecha–Novozybkov	no later than 02.2020	
Central Suburban Passenger Company	Moscow Railway	TC-45 Bryansk-I	23	001–023	Roslavl-1–Zhukovka	no later than 02.2020	
Central Suburban Passenger Company	Moscow Railway	TC-45 Bryansk-I	23	001–023	Oryol–Verkhovye–Livny	no later than summer 2020	
Central Suburban Passenger Company	Moscow Railway	TC-45 Bryansk-I	23	001–023	Oryol–Mikhaylovskiy rudnik	no later than summer 2020	
Central Suburban Passenger Company	Moscow Railway	TC-45 Bryansk-I	23	001–023	Golutvin–Ozyory	from 12.2019	
Central Suburban Passenger Company	Moscow Railway	TC-45 Bryansk-I	23	001–023	Kursk–Lgov–Glushkovo	from 05.02.2021	
Russian Railways	Gorky Railway	TC-18 Kanash	5	029, 031–034	Izhevsk–Balezino–Glazov	from 18.02.2020 (to Balezino from 01.01.2020)	
Russian Railways	Gorky Railway	TC-18 Kanash	5	029, 031–034	Izhevsk–Ufa	from 05.02.2020	
Russian Railways	Gorky Railway	TC-18 Kanash	5	029, 031–034	Izhevsk–Nizhnekamsk	from 19.02.2020	
Russian Railways	Gorky Railway	TC-18 Kanash	5	029, 031–034	Kovrov–Murom	from 02.2020	
North Caucasus Suburban Passenger Company	North Caucasus Railway	TCM-4 Rostov-Glavny	4	027, 028, 030, 069	Rostov-Glavny–Salsk–Kuberle–Volgodonsk	from 07.02.2020	
North Caucasus Suburban Passenger Company	North Caucasus Railway	TCM-4 Rostov-Glavny	4	027, 028, 030, 069	Rostov-Glavny–Yeysk	from 03.07.2021	
Southern Suburban Passenger Company	Crimea Railway	TC-1 Simferopol	9	035–043	Simferopol–Feodosia	from 01.07.2020	
Southern Suburban Passenger Company	Crimea Railway	TC-1 Simferopol	9	035–043	Feodosia–Kerch	from 15.07.2020	
Southern Suburban Passenger Company	Crimea Railway	TC-1 Simferopol	9	035–043	Dzhankoy–Kerch	from 15.07.2020	
Southern Suburban Passenger Company	Crimea Railway	TC-1 Simferopol	9	035–043	Feodosia–Armyansk	from 15.07.2020	
Southern Suburban Passenger Company	Crimea Railway	TC-1 Simferopol	9	035–043	Dzhankoy–Armyansk	from 15.07.2020	
Northern Suburban Passenger Company	Northern Railway	TC-4 Danilov	16	047, 053–059, 062–064, 067, 068, 070–072	Ivanovo–Kineshma	from 30.07.2020	
Northern Suburban Passenger Company	Northern Railway	TC-4 Danilov	16	047, 053–059, 062–064, 067, 068, 070–072	Ivanovo–Shuya–Kovrov-1	from 01.02.2021 (to Shuya from 10.05.2021)	
Northern Suburban Passenger Company	Northern Railway	TC-4 Danilov	16	047, 053–059, 062–064, 067, 068, 070–072	Ivanovo–Yaroslavl	from 01.02.2021 to 09.05.2021	
Northern Suburban Passenger Company	Northern Railway	TC-4 Danilov	16	047, 053–059, 062–064, 067, 068, 070–072	Ivanovo–Furmanov–Nerekhta	from 05.02.2021 (until Furmanov from 10.05.202)	
Northern Suburban Passenger Company	Northern Railway	TC-4 Danilov	16	047, 053–059, 062–064, 067, 068, 070–072	Shuya–Ivanovo–Nerekhta	from 10.05.2021	
Northern Suburban Passenger Company	Northern Railway	TC-4 Danilov	16	047, 053–059, 062–064, 067, 068, 070–072	Ivanovo–Teykovo–Gavrilov Posad–Yuryev-Polsky–Alexandrov	from 17.05.2021	
Northern Suburban Passenger Company	Northern Railway	TC-4 Danilov	16	047, 053–059, 062–064, 067, 068, 070–072	Ivanovo–Furmanov–Privolzhsk–Volgorechensk	from 22.09.2023	
Northern Suburban Passenger Company	Northern Railway	TC-4 Danilov	16	047, 053–059, 062–064, 067, 068, 070–072	Volgorechensk–Privolzhsk–Furmanov	from 22.09.2023	
Northern Suburban Passenger Company	Northern Railway	TC-4 Danilov	16	047, 053–059, 062–064, 067, 068, 070–072	Arkhangelsk–Onega	from 07.09.2020	
Northern Suburban Passenger Company	Northern Railway	TC-4 Danilov	16	047, 053–059, 062–064, 067, 068, 070–072	Arkhangelsk–Solombalka	from 07.09.2020	
Northern Suburban Passenger Company	Northern Railway	TC-4 Danilov	16	047, 053–059, 062–064, 067, 068, 070–072	Arkhangelsk–Sia	from 12.2020 or early 2021	
Northern Suburban Passenger Company	Northern Railway	TC-4 Danilov	16	047, 053–059, 062–064, 067, 068, 070–072	Arkhangelsk–Severodvinsk	from 12.2020	
Northern Suburban Passenger Company	Northern Railway	TC-4 Danilov	16	047, 053–059, 062–064, 067, 068, 070–072	Severodvinsk–Nyonoksa	from 12.2020	
Sverdlovsk Suburban Company	Sverdlovsk Railway	TC-11 Nizhny Tagil	4	048–051	Perm-I–Lysva	from 01.2021	
Sverdlovsk Suburban Company	Sverdlovsk Railway	TC-11 Nizhny Tagil	4	048–051	Shartash–Yegorshino–Alapayevsk	from 10.01.2021	
Sverdlovsk Suburban Company	Sverdlovsk Railway	TC-11 Nizhny Tagil	4	048–051	Yekaterinburg-Passazhirskiy–Verkhny Ufaley	from 15.01.2021	
Russian Railways	Kuybyshev Railway	TC-21 Dyoma	2	052, 065	Ufa–Novoabzakovo	from 02.01.2021 to 28.03.2021	
Russian Railways	Kuybyshev Railway	TC-21 Dyoma	2	052, 065	Ufa–Kumertau	02.0.2021	
Russian Railways	October Railway	TC-15 Saint Petersburg Baltic	3	060, 061, 066	Petrozavodsk–Sortavala	from 02 to 09.01.2021, from 21 to 23.02.2021, from 06 to 08.03.2021, from 01 to 09.05.2021, from 29.05.2021	
Russian Railways	October Railway	TC-15 Saint Petersburg Baltic	3	060, 061, 066	Lodeynoye Pole–Sortavala	from 05.06.2021	
Chernozem'ye Passenger Company	South Eastern Railway	TC-5 YVZD Otrazhka	2		Voronezh–Belgorod		

There is also information about the RA3 being assigned to TCH-32 depot of the South Urals Railway (Chelyabinsk) and TCH-7 of the Kuibyshev Railway (Ruzaevka).

=== Service assessment ===
During their service, RA3 multiple units have received mostly positive feedback from CPPC and the Russian Railways. Among the advantages of the new multiple units compared to their predecessors, drivers noted easier control thanks to the increased cabin space, improved ergonomics and layout of control instruments, the presence of a microprocessor control system with wide functionality and automatic fault diagnostics, quick access to braking equipment and safety switches, air conditioning and heating systems, smooth ride quality and good acceleration and braking dynamics, as well as the ability to operate trains in a multiple-unit formation.

At the same time, a number of shortcomings were identified as a result of the operation analysis of the RA3. During the seminar on the operation and maintenance of the multiple units held in Yaroslavl in February 2021, attention was paid to some shortcomings alongside their advantages, and railway workers expressed wishes for improving the model. It was recommended to equip the cars with external surveillance cameras to monitor passenger boarding and alighting as well as the condition of the multiple unit, to provide the system control monitor with information about the pre-failure state of control units and power equipment, and to install tables for passengers in the cabins. It was noted that opening the inter-car sliding door requires a lot of effort. The sun visor limits the visibility for the assistant driver when standing. When a maximum speed is set for a given section, the automatic guidance system allows it to be exceeded by 2–3 km/h. In winter, snow gets packed into the couplings of the leading cars and other important parts, and also sticks to the headlight glass. Representatives from the manufacturer promised to take action, including making changes to trains that are already in service.

Passengers also complained about the seats being uncomfortable in 3rd class cars during long trips on extended routes and the lack of window-side tables.

== Accidents and incidents ==
The first incidents involving RA3 were recorded in August 2020. During that month, the RA3-034 multiple unit was involved in three different minor incidents (no casualties or serious injuries).

- On 2 August 2020, at 9:29 am, RA3-034, operating as a train No. 7004 Kineshma – Ivanovo, collided with a car that ran through a level crossing at the Kaminsky – Yermolino crossing. The train continued its journey with an 8-minute delay. The car driver fled the scene.
- On the same day, after RA3-034 left Vichuga railway station, a few teenage boys threw stones at it, one of which partially broke a window (the inner glass held up). Camera footage helped identify the people involved.
- On 18 August 2020, at 11:56 am, RA3-034 operating from Ivanovo to Kineshma, hit a concrete milestone post placed between the rails. Thanks to the driver's alertness, they managed to significantly slow down during the incident. The multiple unit was going at approximaletly 100 km/h, in which the emergency braking didn’t bring it to a complete stop before the collision. The decorative coating of the car was damaged.

== See also ==
- RA1
- RA2
