= Rolling stock manufacturers of Russia =

This is an overview of rolling stock manufacturers of Russia, which includes historical and current information.

== History ==
In 1834 the Cherepanov brothers, engineers from the Nizhny Tagil Iron and Steel Plant, built Russia's first steam locomotive. Three years later the Tsarskoye Selo Railway, the country's first public railway, opened. In 1845, the Alexander Factory in Saint Petersburg built its first locomotives. The Kolomna Factory and Kama-Votkinsk began production in 1868. Two years later, the Malcev and Nevsky Plants began production. In 1924 the first Russian mainline diesel locomotives, the E el-2 and Shch-el 1, entered service. Two years later the first electrified suburban section of the Baku-Sabunçu railway was put into service, marking the beginning of commuter-train production. In 1932, the first electrified railway through the Surami Pass opened and the first Soviet mainline electric locomotive was put into service.

During the Great Patriotic War, production of diesel and electric locomotives was suspended; only steam locomotives were produced. After the war, some factories shifted their focus from steam to diesel and electric locomotives. In 1956, at the 20th Party Congress, it was decided to mass-produce electric and diesel locomotives and mothball steam locomotives as a strategic reserve. Two years later, imports of passenger electric locomotives from Czechoslovakia began. In 1959 the first Soviet gas turbine-electric locomotive, the model G1, was introduced. The Soviet Union's first high-speed train, the ER200, was built in 1974. Commercial operation began in 1984 on the Moscow - Leningrad railway, and was discontinued in 2009. In 2002 Transmashholding, a closed joint-stock company, was formed.

== Locomotive and multiple-unit manufacturers ==
Transmashholding
Name	Location	Founded	Types	Models
Novocherkassk Electric Locomotive Plant	Novocherkassk	1932	Passenger and freight mainline electric locomotives, industrial electric locomotives	Passenger: EP1M, EP1P, EP20; Freight: 2ES5K, 3ES5K, 2ES4K, 2ES5, E5K; Industrial: NPM2, NP1 (tractor unit)
Kolomna Plant	Kolomna	1863	Passenger and freight mainline diesel locomotives, passenger mainline electric locomotives	Passenger diesel locomotives: TEP70BS, TEP70U; Freight diesel locomotive: 2TE70; Passenger electric locomotive: EP2K
Bryansk Machine-Building Plant	Bryansk	1873	Freight mainline diesel locomotives, shunting diesel locomotives	Freight:2TE25A; Shunting: TEM18DM, TEM18V, TEM-TMH
Demikhovsky Machine-building Plant (DMZ)	Demikhova, Orehovo-Zuyevskii Raion, Moscow Region	1935	Electric trains	ED4M, ED4M 500 series, ED9E
Metrovagonmash	Mytishchi	1897	Subway cars, railcars	Subway cars: 81-717M, 81-740/741 "Rusich", 81-760/761 "Oka", 81-718/719, 81-720/721 "Yauza"; Railcars: RA1 model 730, RA2

Other manufacturers
Name	Location	Founded	Parent company	Types	Models
Ural Locomotives	Verkhnyaya Pyshma	2010	Joint venture Sinara transport machines (51%) and Siemens (49%)	Freight electric locomotives, EMUs	Freight locomotives: 2ES6, 2ES10 "Granite"; EMU: ES1 Lastochka ("Swallow"; platform based on Siemens Desiro)
Lyudinovsky Locomotive Plant	Lyudinovo	1745	Sinara transport machines	Shunting diesel locomotives, railcars	Shunting: TGM4B, TGM6D, TEM7A, TEM9, TEM14; Railcar: AS4MU
Muromteplovoz	Murom	1916		Shunting diesel locomotives, railcars, small locomotives, self-propelled railroad cars	Shunting: TGM23; Small locomotives: MGM-1, MGM-3; Railcars: AS5, AGD-1A, ARV(M)-1, ARV-1, AST-2, AGS-1Ch; Self-propelled railroad car: SV-10
Kambarka Engineering Works	Kambarka	1767	More than 50% owned by general director Alexander Biryukov, 12% managed by Udmurtian government	Narrow-gauge diesel locomotives, shunting diesel locomotives, narrow-gauge draisines, small locomotives, railcars, children's-railway locomotives, rail-testing equipment, snowplows	Narrow-gauge locomotives: TU7A, TU8; Shunting: TGM40; Small locomotive: MTK-1; Children's locomotive: TU10
Kalugaputmash	Kaluga	1874	Investment fund managed by TransFinGroup (96.61%)	Shunting diesel locomotives, railcar service, traction engines, railway cranes, rail-welding machines, tamping machines	Shunting: TGK2M
Kirov May 1 Mashzavod	Kirov	1899		Work trains, railway cranes	
Istinsky Machine Works	Iste, Starozhilovsky District, Ryazan Oblast	1713		Work trains	
Tulazheldormash	Tula	1869		Work trains	
Torzhok Carriage Works	Torzhok	1916		Diesel multiple units	DT1
TMCP V.V. Vorovsky	Tikhoretsk	1899		Work trains	

Railway-wagon manufacturers
Name	Location	Founded	Parent company	Types
Tver Carriage Works	Tver	1898	Transmashholding	Passenger cars: one-story and double-decker cars, staff cars, commuter passenger cars, dining cars, escort cars, cars for laundry, valuables, prisoners, hospital transport and transporting spent nuclear fuel
RM Rail	Saransk, Moscow (headquarters), plants in Saransk, Ruzaevka and Abakan	2013	Basic Element	Freight cars: Tank cars for petroleum and petroleum products, viscous oil and liquefied petroleum gas; chemical and special-cargo hopper cars for cement, grain, fertilizer, granular sulfur, flat wagons, trucks, cars, railcars and containers
Uralwagonsawod	Nizhny Tagil	1936		Freight cars: Tanks, platforms, gondolas, hoppers
Altaiwagon	Novoaltaysk, Rubtsovsk, Kemerovo	1941	Siberian Business Union	Freight cars: Boxcars, gondolas, platforms, tanks
Kaliningrad Carriage Works	Kaliningrad	1946		Freight cars: Dump cars
United Wagon Company (Tikhvin Freight Car Building Plant)	Tikhvin	2011	ICT Group	Freight cars: Hopper cars, gondolas, platforms

== Academic and research institutions ==
The All-Russian Research Institute of Railway Transport (VNIIZhT), in Moscow, was founded in 1918. It has branches in Ekaterinburg, Nizhny Novgorod, Belorechensk, and Irkutsk. An experimental ring railroad, VNIIZhT, was commissioned in 1932. Located in Shcherbinka, it includes of research laboratories and three electrified circular lines. The experimental ring is intended to testlocomotives, multiple units, coaches, track elements and other equipment. The All-Union Scientific and Research, Planning and Design Technological Institute on Electric Locomotives Building (VELNII) is a subsidiary of Transmashholding.

== See also ==
- Rail transport in Russia
