= RA1 (railbus) =

Russian light passenger rail bus series

RA1 (Russian: РА1)
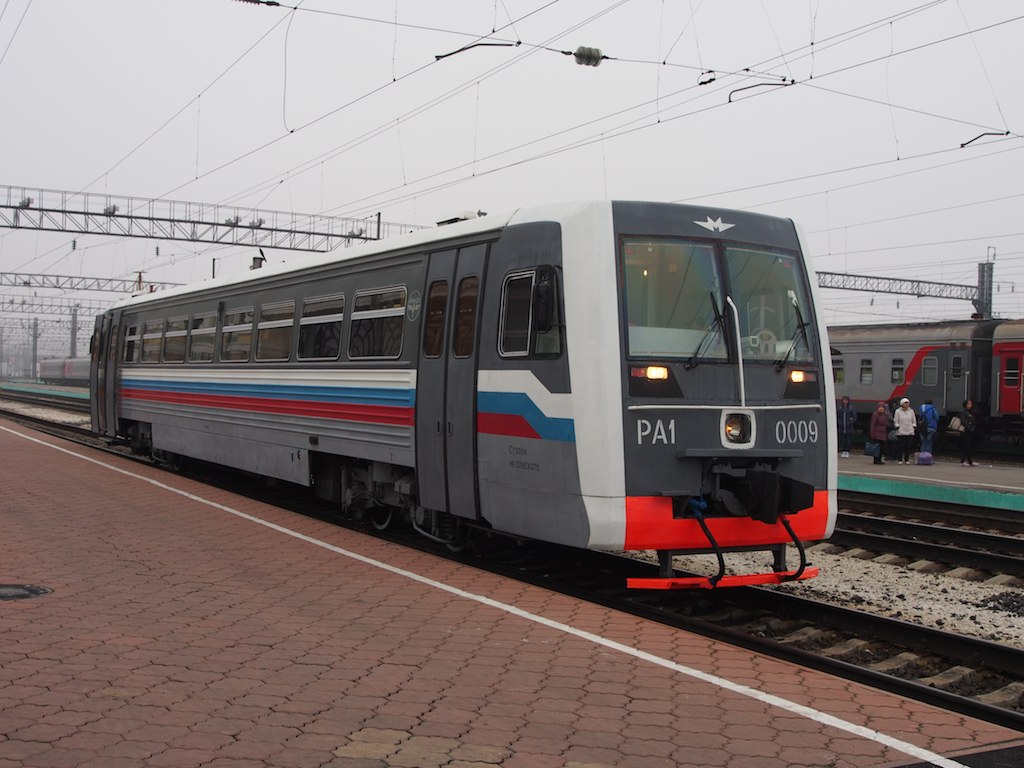
- RA1-0009 (731 model)

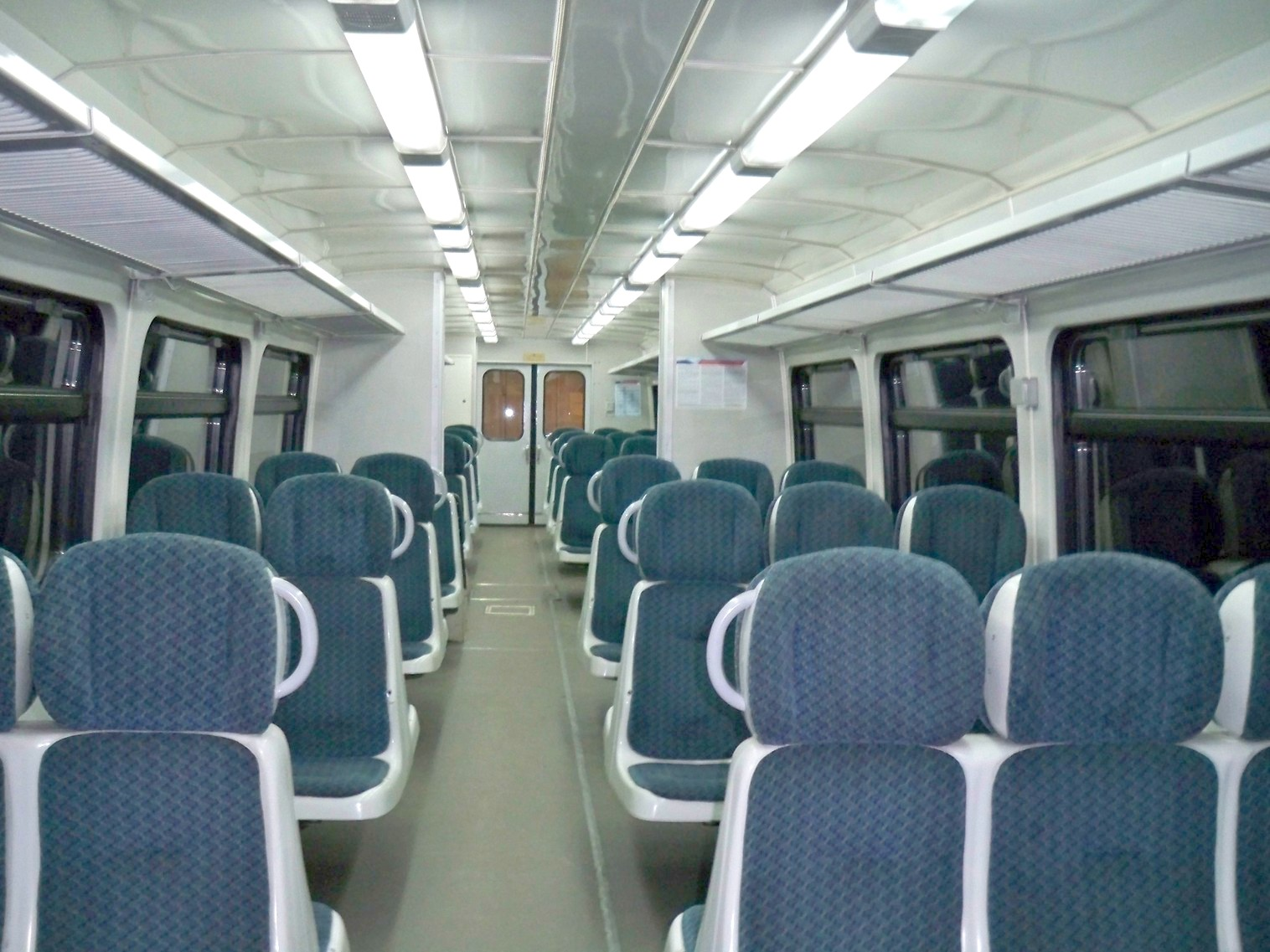
- Manufacturer: (Russia) Metrowagonmash
- Constructed: 1997-OT
- Number built: 173
- Operators: (Russia) (Hungary) (Czech Republic) (till 2007)

Specifications
- Maximum speed: 120 km/h (75 mph)
- Prime mover: Diesel engine
- Power output: 315 kW (422 hp)
- Tractive effort: 140 kN (31,500 lbf)
- Transmission: Hydraulic machinery
- Bogies: 2
- Track gauge: 1,520 mm (4 ft 11 27/32 in)

RA1 (Russian: РА1 - рельсовый автобус, тип 1) (Rail Bus, 1st type) - a series of rail buses that unified structurally with metrovagon. It is produced by JSC "Metrovagonmash". That is an independent mobile unit for the carriage of passengers. The term "Motor coach" is considered more correct by the majority of specialists. However PA1 is classified exactly as "railbuses" in the JSC "Metrovagonmash" factory documentation. Designed for the transport of passengers on non-electrified sections of railways and can be used for urban, suburban and interregional communication. Railbus have cabins at both ends of the car, and do not require a turn. At the same time, RA1 can be operated singly and in the system of many units (in pairs with 2-3 sections) both. The family PA1 is represented by six models. The body, the crew and the undercarriage are made on the basis of the "Yauza" subway wagons.

== History ==
Only three copies of this bus were issued for the first 4 years of production (1997-2002). First unit was operated in motor-car depot South-Eastern Railway since August 2000. Second one entered the Kaliningrad Railway after testing at the experimental ring in Shcherbinka in June 2002. The third unit design documentation was developed, but release of unit was heavily delayed.

The first and second "railbuses" had imported diesel engine and hydraulic transmission on board. The third unit designed for domestic nodes installation. All unitscopies had design different from each other. The first copy of RA1 was originally released with a Scharfenberg automatic coupler (metro coupler) and high footrests. Further, this coupler was replaced by an automatic coupler "SA-3". Third unit was sent for Dubna city operations.

There was a break in 2004–2005, because the rail buses went into series and became entering to many roads of the rail network by small lots. No less than 38 RA1 rail buses have been manufactured at October 2005. The number was reached 91 units (excluding export and metro versions) at the end of 2006. Plus 41 export units and some machines for the domestic metro.

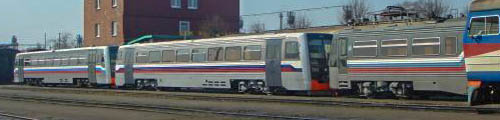
RA1 731 model (left and center side) and 730 model (right side) in Kaliningrad.
