= Rail transport in Russia =

Russia

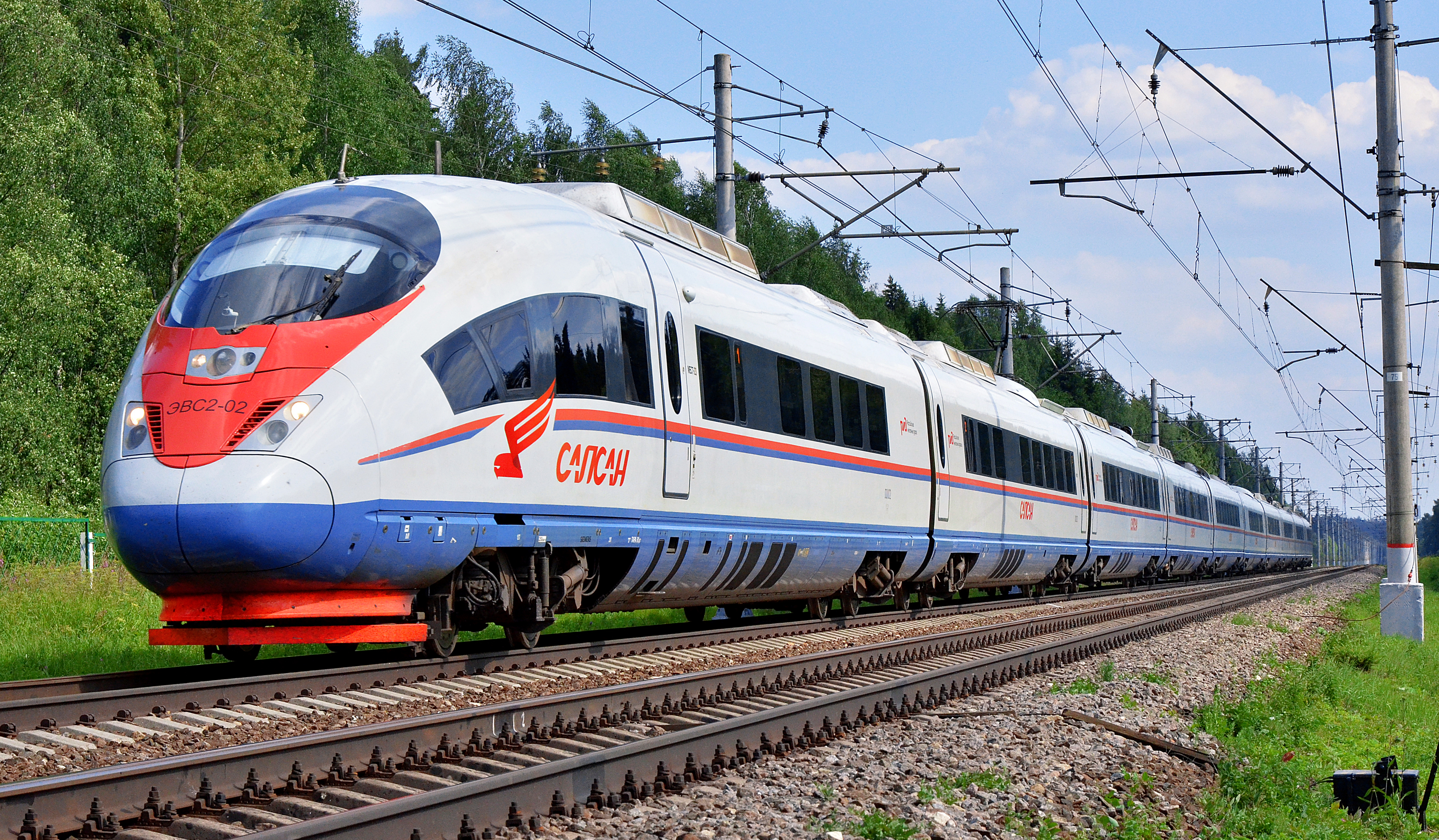
- EVS1/EVS2 Sapsan

Operation
- Major operators: Russian Railways

Statistics
- Ridership: 570,80 million passenger trips (2023)
- Passenger-distance: 56 billion passenger-kilometers (2023)
- Freight: 619 million tons (2023)

System length
- Total: 92,000 km (57,160 mi)
- Electrified: 48,100 km (27,400 mi)

Track gauge
- Main: 1,520 mm (4 ft 11 27/32 in)

Features
- No. of stations: 13,000 (2023)
Map

The most important railway lines of Russia.

Rail transport in Russia runs on one of the largest railway networks in the world. By both volume of freight hauled, and passenger volume, they are second to only China. In total length, they are third largest, after China and the United States.

JSC Russian Railways has a near-monopoly on long-distance train travel in Russia, with a 98.6% market share in 2017. Independent long-distance carriers include Grand Service Express TC, Tverskoy Express, TransClassService, Sakhalin Passenger Company, Kuzbass Suburb, and Yakutian Railway.

== Characteristics ==
Russia is a large country, covering parts of Europe and Asia. In terms of total land area, it is larger than both the United States and China. Therefore, its rail density (rail tracking/country area) is lower compared to those two countries. Since Russia's population density is also much lower than that of China and the United States, the Russian railways carry freight and passengers over very long distances, often through vast, nearly barren land. Coal and coke make up almost one-third of the freight traffic and have average hauls of around 1,500 kilometres (930 mi), while ferrous metals make up another 10% of freight traffic and travel an average of over 1,900 kilometres (1,200 mi). Railroads are often key to getting supplies shipped to remote parts of the country as many people do not have access to other reliable means of shipping.

Like most railways, rail transport in Russia carries both freight and passengers. It is one of the most freight-dominant railways in the world (after only Canada, the United States, and Estonia) in the ratio of freight ton-kilometers to passenger-kilometers. However, per head of population, intercity passenger travel is far greater than the United States (which has the lowest long-distance passenger train usage in the developed world).

Russia's active railway network is 92,000 km (57,000 mi) long, of which 48,000 km (30,000 mi), or 53.48%, are electrified. It has the 3rd longest railway network in the world after the United States and China. Russia has the largest European railway network, followed by Germany and France.

== Structure ==
Russia's railways are divided into seventeen regional railways, from the October Railway serving the St. Petersburg region to the Far Eastern Railway serving Vladivostok, with the free-standing Kaliningrad and Sakhalin Railways on either end. The regional railways were closely coordinated by the Ministry of the Means of Communication until 2003, and Russian Railways since then, coordination including the pooling and redistribution of revenues. This coordination has been crucial to two long-standing policies of cross-subsidization: 1) passenger operations from freight revenues and 2) coal shipments from other freight.

== History ==
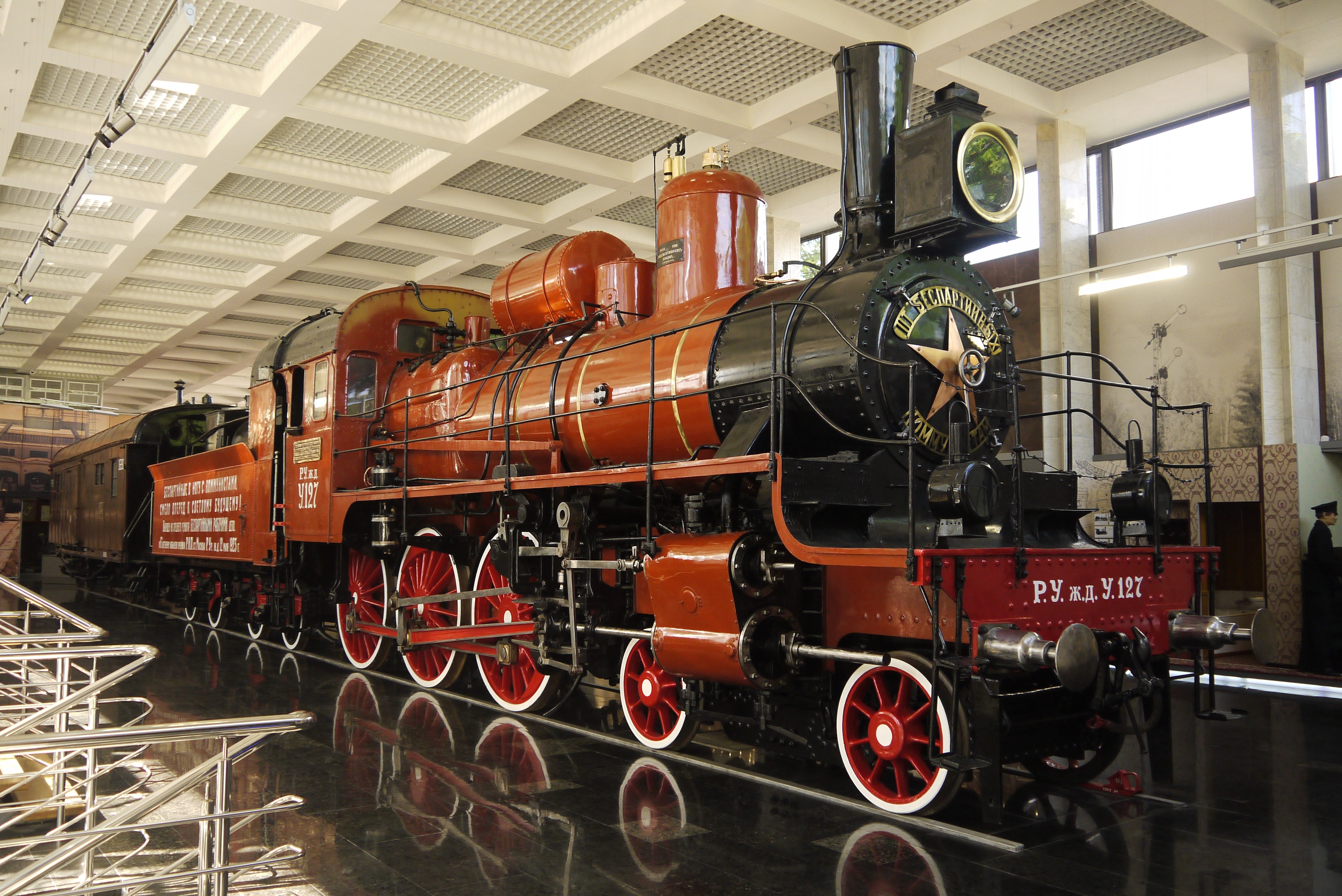
Russian locomotive class U – U-127 Lenin's 4-6-0 oil burning compound locomotive, currently preserved at the Museum of the Moscow Railway at Paveletsky Rail Terminal

The Russian railways were a collection of mostly privately owned and operated companies during most of the 19th century, though many had been constructed with heavy government involvement and financing. The tsarist government began mobilizing and nationalizing the rail system as World War I approached, and the new communist government finished the nationalization process. With the dissolution of the USSR in 1991, the Russian Federation was left with three-fifths of the railway track of the Union as well as nine-tenths of the highway mileage. though only two-fifths of the port capacity.

In the 21st century, substantial changes in the Russian railways have been discussed and implemented in the context of two government reform documents: Decree No. 384 of 18 May 2001 of the Government of the Russian Federation, "A Program for Structural Reform of Railway Transport", and Order No. 877 of 17 June 2008 of the Government of the Russian Federation, "The Strategy for Railway Development in the Russian Federation to 2030". The former focused on restructuring the railways from government-owned monopoly to private competitive sector; the latter focused on ambitious plans for equipment modernization and network expansion.

=== Timeline of railway implementation ===
1837 – the Tsarskoye Selo Railway (27 km);

1843 – Inkerman Railway (about one km);

1848 – the Warsaw-Vienna Railway (800 km);

1851 – Nikolaevskaya railway (645 km);

1854 — Connecting Line (4,73 km), first trans-line connector to form the future network;

1855 – The Balaklava Railway (about 23 km);

1861 – the Riga-Dinaburg railway (218 km);

1862 – the Saint Petersburg–Warsaw Railway (1116 km);

1862 – the Moscow-Nizhny Novgorod railway (437 km);

1868 – Moscow-Kursk railway (543 km);

1870 – Yaroslavl Railway;

1878 – the Ural Mining and Railroads (by 1880–715 km);

1884 – Catherine (Krivorog (g)) railway) (by 1884–523 km);

1890 – Samara-Zlatoust railway (1888 – Samara-Ufa, by 1893 about 1500 km);

1898 – the Perm-Kotlas railway;

1900 – The Ussuri railway (964 km);

1900 – the Moscow-Savyolovo line;

1903 – the Sino-Eastern Railway (Manchurian, Chinese Changchun, Harbin);

1905 – Trans-Baikal Railway; The Circum-Baikal Railway; Petersburg-Vologda railway;

1906 – Theological Railway; The Tashkent railway;

1908 – Little Ring of the Moscow Railway;

1915 – the Altai Railway;

1916 – the Amur Railway; The Volga-Bugulma Railway; West-Ural railway; The Moscow-Kazan railway; North-Eastern Ural Railway; The Trans-Siberian Railway (historical part);

1926 – the Achinsk-Minusinsk railway;

1930 – the Turkestan-Siberian Railway;

1936 – 1937 – Norilsk Railway;

1940 – Kanash–Cheboksary;

1944 – The Big Ring of the Moscow Railway;

1969 – the line of Verbilki–Dubna;

1978 – Rostov-Krasnodar–Tuapse; Yurovsky–Anapa;

2003 – the Baikal–Amur Mainline;

2013 – Adler–Rosa Farm;

2016 – Moscow Central Circle (based on Little Ring of the Moscow Railway);

2017 – The railway line bypassing Ukraine;

2017 – the Amur–Yakutsk railway;

2019 – Railway bridge to the Crimea;

== Statistics ==
Russian Railways accounts for 2.5% of Russia's GDP and employs 800,000 people. The percentage of passenger traffic that goes by rail is unknown, since no statistics are available for private transportation such as private automobiles. In 2007, about 1.3 billion passengers and 1.3 billion tons of freight went via Russian Railways. In 2007 the company owned 19,700 goods and passenger locomotives, 24,200 passenger cars (carriages) (2007) and 526,900 freight cars (goods wagons) (2007). A further 270,000 freight cars in Russia are privately owned.

In 2009 Russia had 128,000 kilometers of common-carrier railway line (of which about half is electrified and carries most of the traffic), and over 40% was double track or better.

In 2013 railways carried nearly 90% of Russia's freight, excluding pipelines.

== Industrial railways ==
Besides the common-carrier railways that are well covered by government statistics there are many industrial railways (such as mining or lumbering railways) whose statistics are covered separately, and which in 1981 had a total length almost equal to the length of the common carrier railways. Currently (2008) they are only about half the length of the common-carrier system. In 1980, about two-thirds of their freight flowed to and from the common-carrier railroads while the remaining third was internal transport only on an industrial railways. (For example, a lumber company uses its private industrial railways to transport logs from a forest to its sawmill.) About 4% of the industrial railway traffic was on track jointly "owned" by two companies.

== Narrow-gauge railways ==
In 1981, there were 33,400 kilometers of narrow gauge.

- Sakhalin Railway – located on Sakhalin, gauge of 1,067 mm (3 ft 6 in)
- Apsheronsk narrow-gauge railway – located in the Krasnodar Krai, gauge of 750 mm (2 ft 5 1/2 in)
- Kudemskaya narrow-gauge railway – located in the Arkhangelsk Oblast, Severodvinsk, gauge of 750 mm
- Alapayevsk narrow-gauge railway – located in the Sverdlovsk Oblast, Alapayevsk, gauge of 750 mm
- Altsevo peat railway – located in Nizhny Novgorod Oblast, gauge of 750 mm
- Kerzhenets peat railway – located in Nizhny Novgorod Oblast, gauge of 750 mm
- Pishchalskoye peat railway – located in Kirov Oblast, gauge of 750 mm
- Gorokhovskoye peat railway – located in Kirov Oblast, gauge of 750 mm
- Narrow-gauge railway of Decor-1 factory – located in the Arzamassky District, gauge of 750 mm
- Narrow-gauge railway of KSM-2 factory – located in the Tver, gauge of 750 mm

== Railway infrastructure ==
=== Couplers ===
The SA3 coupler (Soviet Automatic coupler, model 3) used in Russia has several advantages over the Janney coupler used in the United States.

The SA3 coupler, while well-designed, has had problems with operating due to being made with lower quality steel, having a low quality of maintenance/repairs/rebuilding, and coupling cars at speeds higher than allowed by the rules.

=== Track gauge ===
The majority of Russia's rail network uses the 1,520 mm Russian gauge, which includes all metro systems and the majority of tram networks in the country.

The Sakhalin Railway, on Sakhalin Island used 1,067 mm Cape gauge from its construction under Japan until 2019, when the conversion to 1520 mm completed.

A section from the Poland–Russia border to Kaliningrad, uses the 1,435 mm Standard gauge. Unlike the Sakhalin Railway, which carries freight and passengers, the standard-gauge line in Kaliningrad carries only freight at this time.

Kaliningrad's tram network also uses metre-gauge tracks at 1,000 mm, as does Stavropol krai's Pyatigorsk network.

== Railway universities ==
There are many railway colleges in Russia which are higher educational institutes that train students for railway careers, mainly in engineering.

== Command and control system ==
Since 2010 Russian Railways had started an overhaul of its computer systems. The overhaul will centralize the management of data into new computing hubs, restructure the collection of information on the railway's field operations, and integrate new automation software to help the railway strategise how to deploy its assets. The geriatric machines that the new mainframes will replace include Soviet-built clones of IBM's Cold War–era computers, called ES EVM (the transliterated Russian acronym for "unified system of electronic computing machines").

== Foreign activities ==
The RZD operates the Armenian Railway until 2038. During this period, at least 570 million euro will be invested, 90% going into infrastructure.

Joint ventures have been formed to build and operate a port in Rasŏn in North Korea, and rail links connecting that port to the Russian rail network at the North Korea–Russia border Khasan-Tumangang.

Trans-Eurasia Logistics is a joint venture with RZD that operates container freight trains between Germany and China via Russia.

== Rail links with adjacent countries ==
Voltage of electrification systems not necessarily compatible.

- Same gauge:
  - Estonia
  - Latvia
  - Lithuania – only from the Kaliningrad Oblast exclave
  - Belarus
  - Ukraine – except the Russian-occupied Crimea, Donetsk and Luhansk, all other links are, due to Russian military invasion, closed and largely destroyed
  - Georgia – currently, only connects with the breakaway Republic of Abkhazia; the line beyond, to Georgia proper, is closed for political reasons.
  - Azerbaijan
  - Kazakhstan
  - Mongolia
- Within the tolerance:
  - Finland, the difference to 1,524 mm (5 ft) is small enough that the same rolling stock can be used with gauge tolerance restrictions, up to 200 km/h speed.
- Break-of-gauge:
  - China, break-of-gauge 1,520 mm (4 ft 11 27/32 in) to 1,435 mm (4 ft 8 1/2 in)
  - North Korea, break-of-gauge 1,520 mm (4 ft 11 27/32 in) to 1,435 mm (4 ft 8 1/2 in)
  - Poland – only from the Kaliningrad Oblast exclave – break-of-gauge 1,520 mm (4 ft 11 27/32 in) to 1,435 mm (4 ft 8 1/2 in)
    - The railway Kaliningrad–Elbląg (in Poland) is double track with one track of each gauge.
    - Note that break-of-gauge between Poland and Belarus near Brest is in use of Russian Railways mostly

== See also ==
- Tsarskoye Selo Railway
- Communications in Russia
- Elektrichka
- History of rail transport in Russia
- List of railways in Russia
- List of named passenger trains of Russia
- Ministry of Railways of the USSR
- Moscow – Saint Petersburg Railway
- Russian gauge
- Railway engineering of Russia
- Russian Post
- Russian Railways
- Sibirjak
- Trans-Siberian Railway
- Transport in Russia
- Transportation in Moscow
- Varshavsky Rail Terminal, St.Petersburg – national railway museum of Russia
- The Museum of the Moscow Railway
- Rizhsky Rail Terminal, Home of the Moscow Railway Museum
- Emperor railway station in Pushkin town
- Rolling stock manufacturers of Russia
