= Metrowagonmash =

Railway rolling stock manufacturer in Mytishchi, Moscow Oblast, Russia

- Native name: АО "Метровагонмаш"
- Industry: subway cars, trams and rail buses
- Founded: 1897
- Headquarters: Mytishchi, Russia
- Area served: Worldwide
- Revenue: $748 million (2017)
- Operating income: $77.8 million (2017)
- Net income: $48 million (2017)
- Total assets: $706 million (2017)
- Total equity: $356 million (2017)
- Parent: Transmashholding
- Website: www.metrowagonmash.ru

Metrowagonmash, also Metrovagonmash (Russian: АО "Метровагонмаш", romanized: AO "Metrovagonmash"), is an engineering company in Mytishchi, Russia. Metrowagonmash (MWM) is one of the leading enterprises in Russia operating in the field of transport machine building. It specializes in development, designing and manufacturing of rolling stock for metro systems and railways. Metrowagonmash is part of Transmashholding.

In May 2009 its Mytishchi Machine-building Factory was spun off as a separate truck and armored vehicle manufacturing company.

== History ==
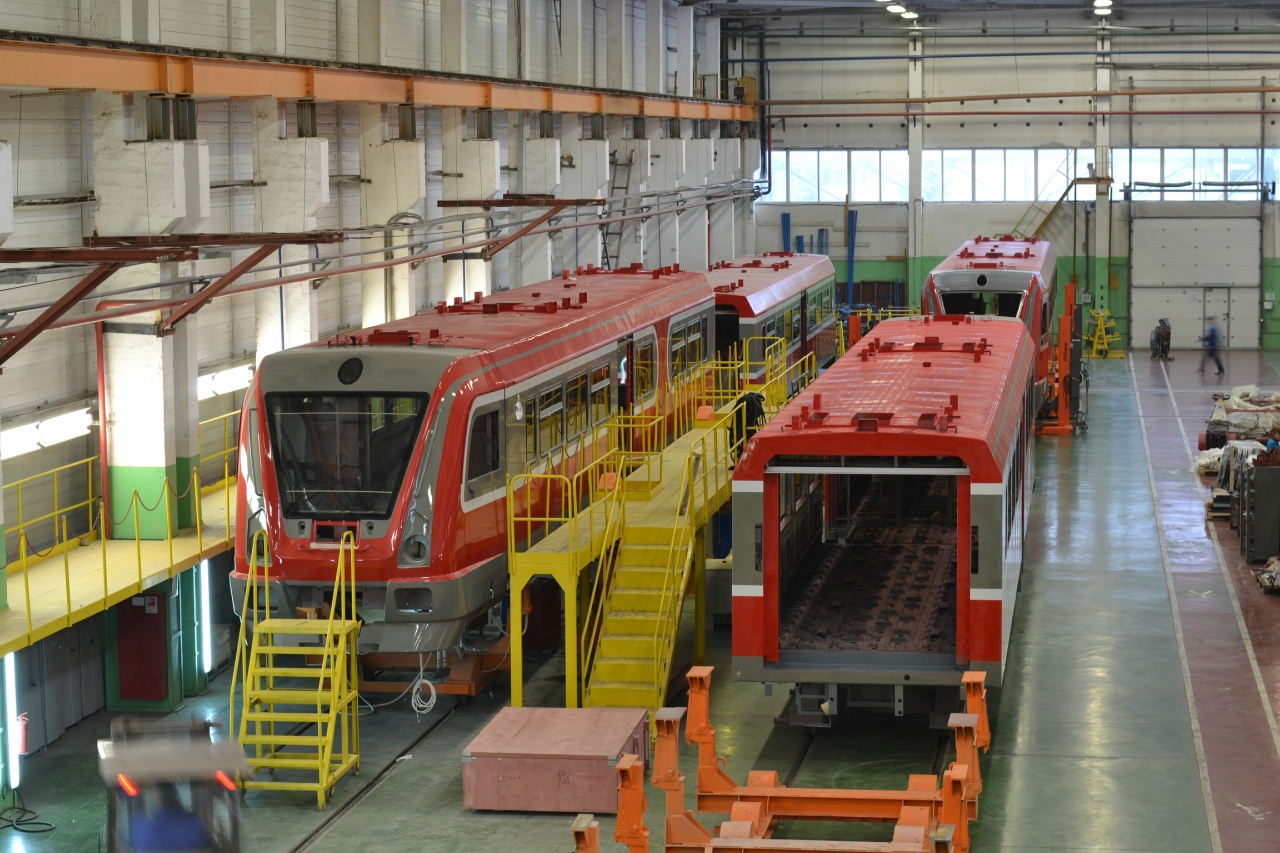
The workshop of Metrowagonmash

The plant was founded in 1897, in the village of Big Mytishchi, to manufacture railcars, first for the Russian North Railway. Trams and snowplows for Moscow have been produced since 1903, electric passenger trains since 1929, and metro cars since 1934.

During World War II, self-propelled guns, military tractors, tracked vehicles and other military material were produced. The plant was partially evacuated to the Ural region in October 1941. The equipment was back the following year. In 1947, production of dump trucks was started. The company later concentrated on production of subway cars, dump trucks and armored tracked vehicles (e.g. GM chassises). A number of models of Metrowagonmash subway cars have been deployed in nearly every subway (Metro) system of the former Soviet Union, as well as in Budapest, Prague, Sofia and Warsaw.

In 1999, the plant started manufacturing rail buses as well. The plant also manufactured 137 RA2 Multiple Units between 2006 and 2008. Today Metrowagonmash is among the five thousand top enterprises in the country.

On 19 May 2023, Metrowagonmash was sanctioned by the United States Office of Foreign Assets Control. The United States Department of State said that the plant was involved in the production of military equipment, such as components for surface-to-air radar, weapons systems, and armoured tracked vehicles.

== List of products ==
Metrowagonmash is the leading manufacturer of cars for metro systems of large cities of the CIS countries and of several Eastern European states. The enterprise has mastered manufacture of Light Rail cars designed for the lines of the Moscow Metro. Other specific products for the plant are rail buses. These vehicles are relatively new for the domestic railways and are designed for operation on suburban and interregional non-electrified routes.

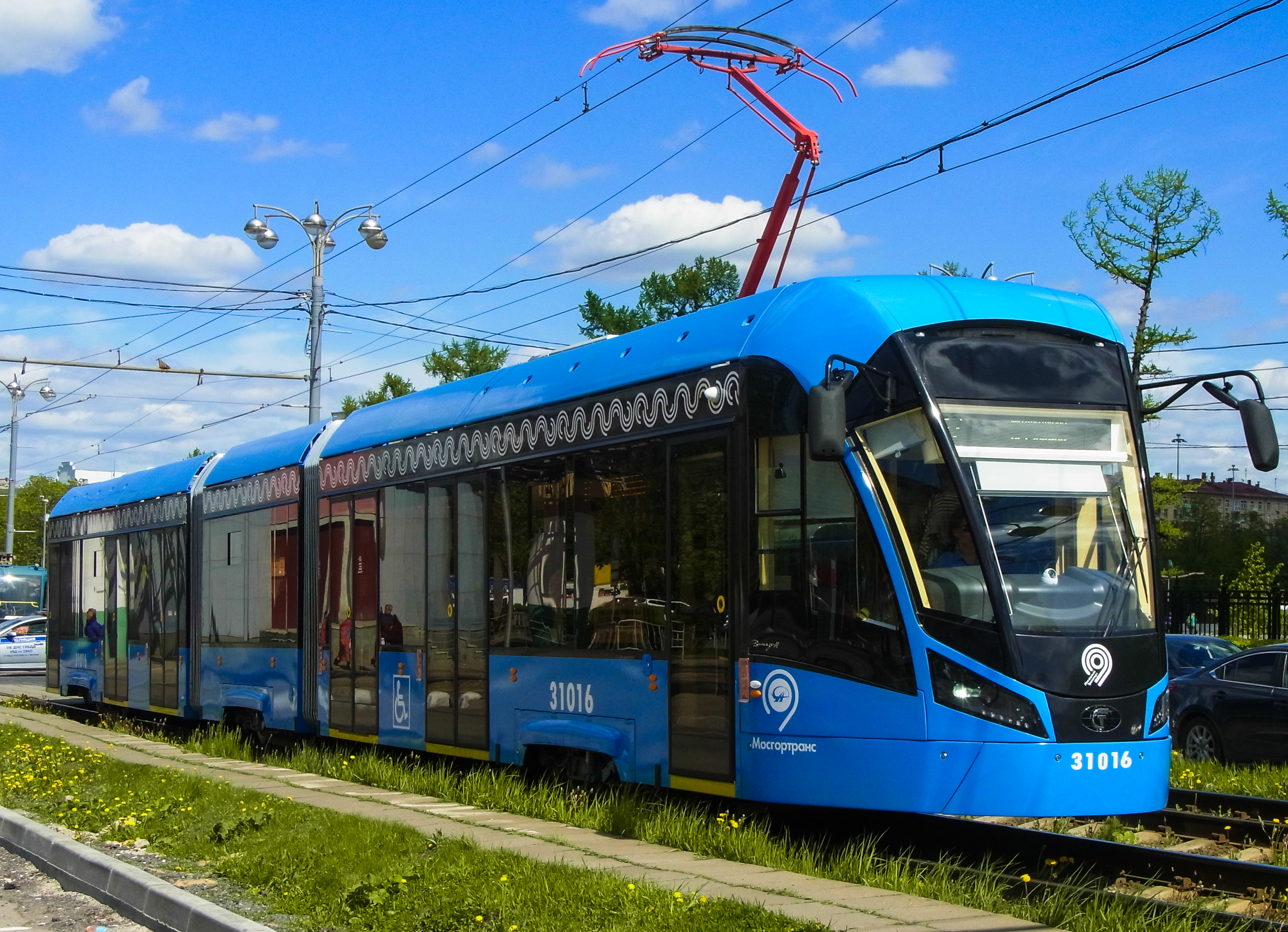
Tram 71-931M "Vityaz"

=== Rolling stock ===
As of 2024, Metrowagonmash produces the following models of rolling stock:

- Metro 81-725/726/727 "Baltiets"
- Metro 81-765/766/767 "Moskva"
- Metro 81-775/776/777 "Moskva-2020"
- Metro 81-775.2/776.2/777.2 "Moskva-2024"
- Tram 71-931M "Vityaz"

== Gallery ==
Electric subway rolling stock

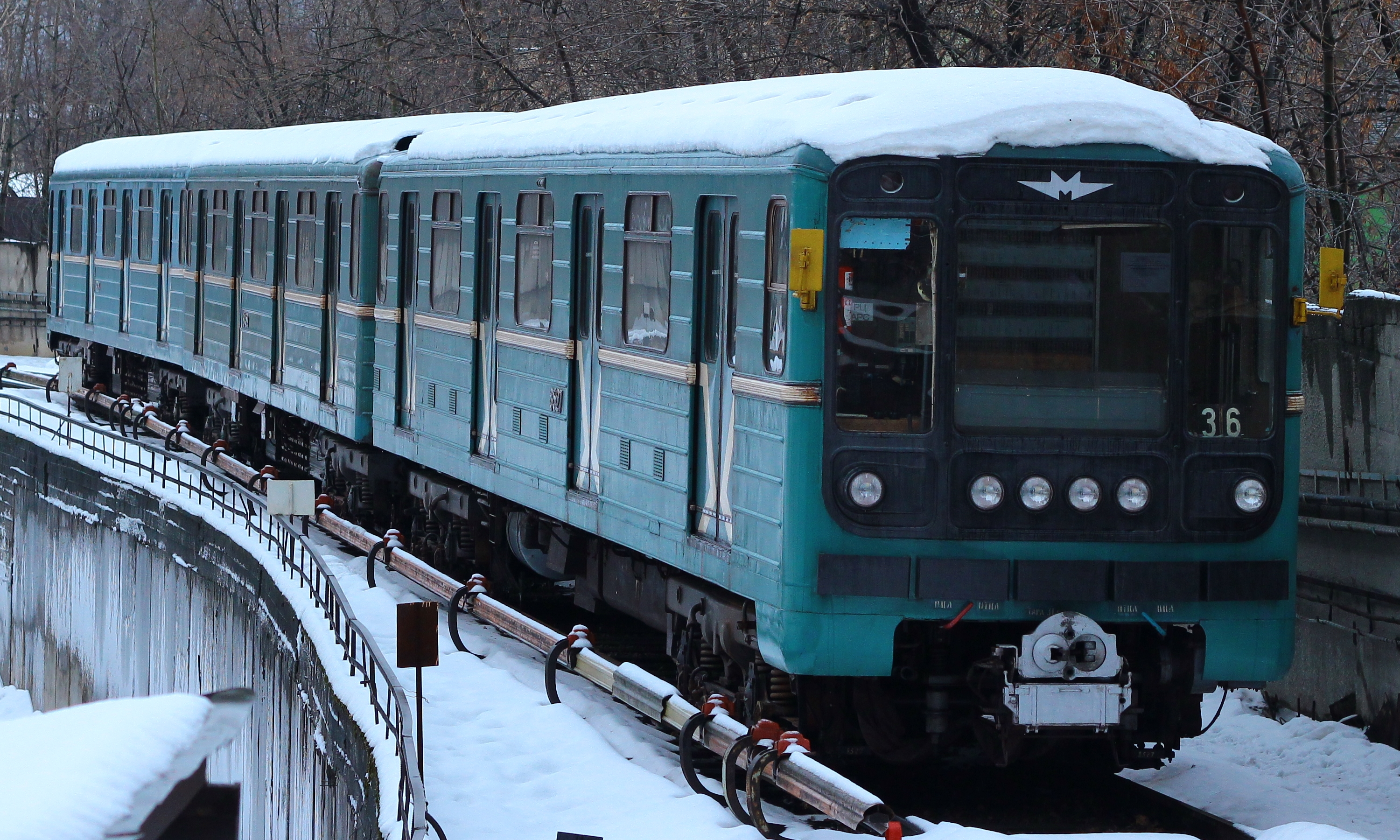
Moscow Metro, 81-717/714

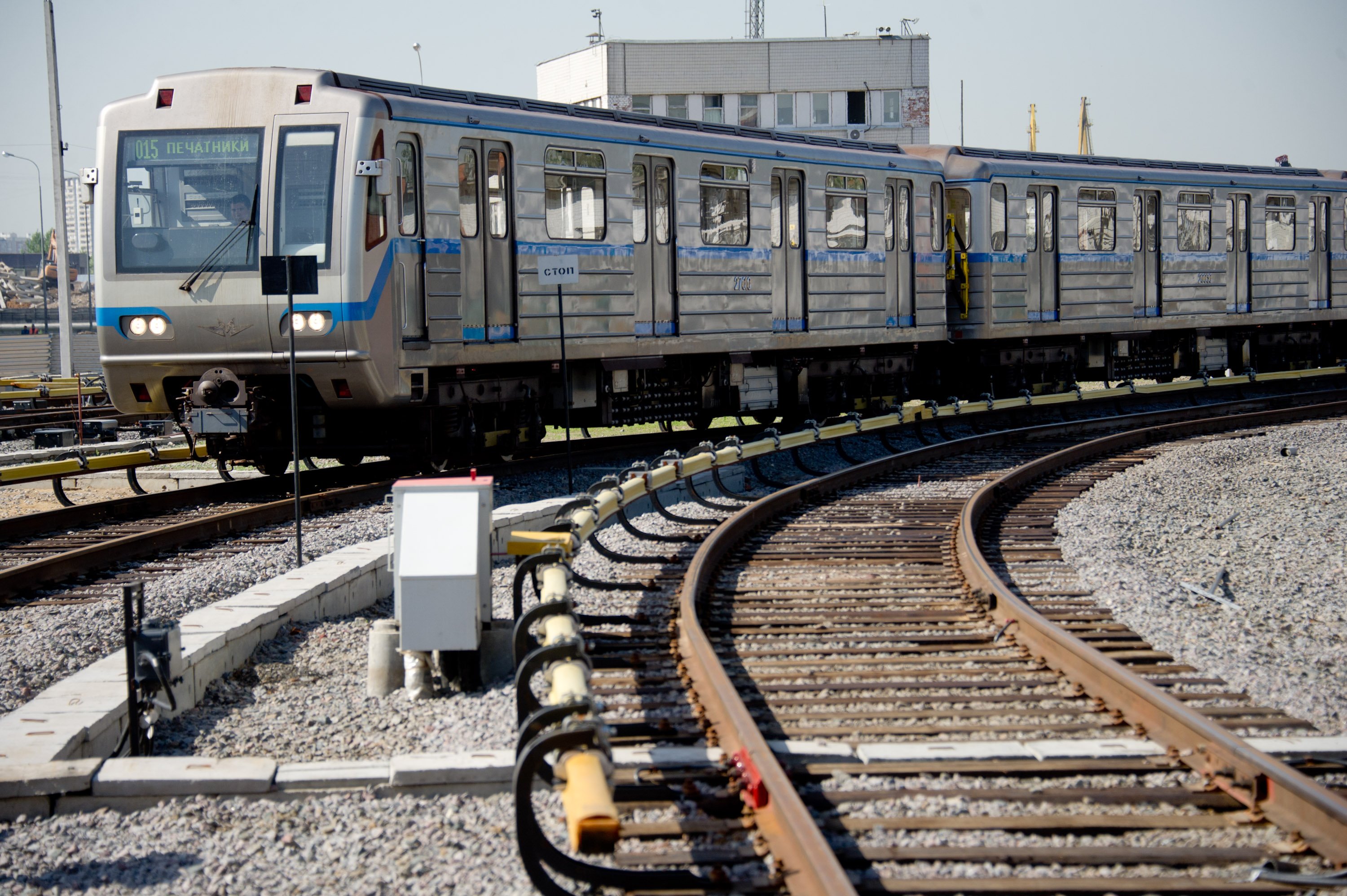
Moscow Metro, 81-717.6/714.6

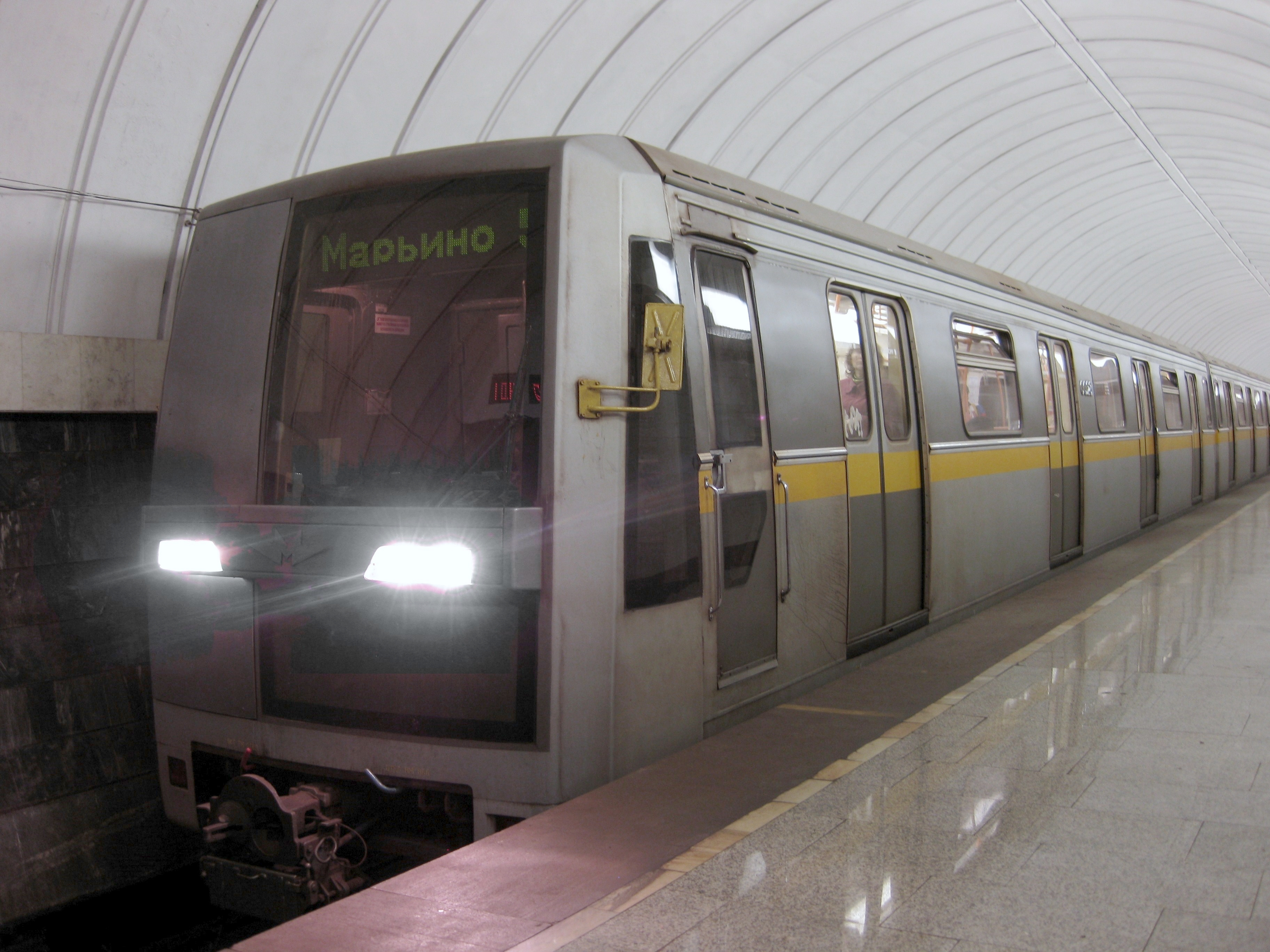
Moscow Metro, 81-720/721

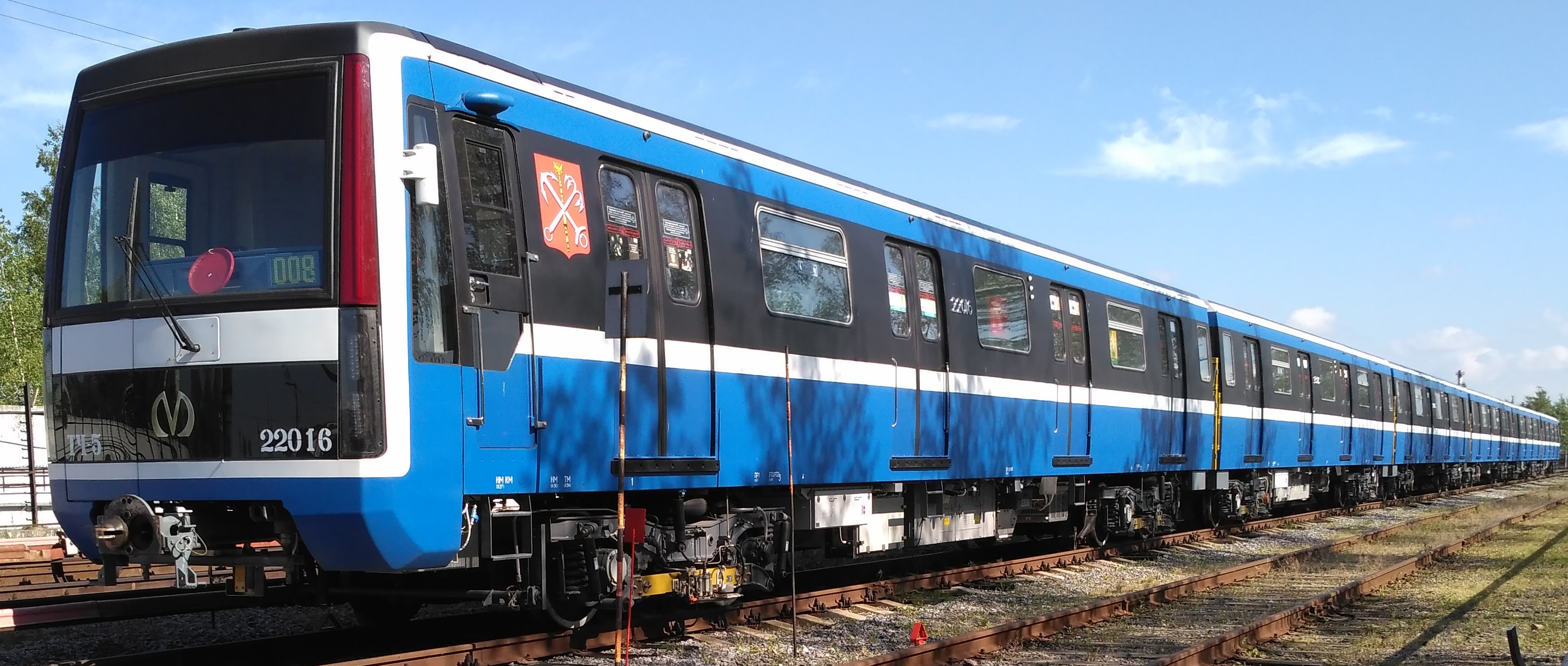
Saint Petersburg Metro, 81-722/723/724

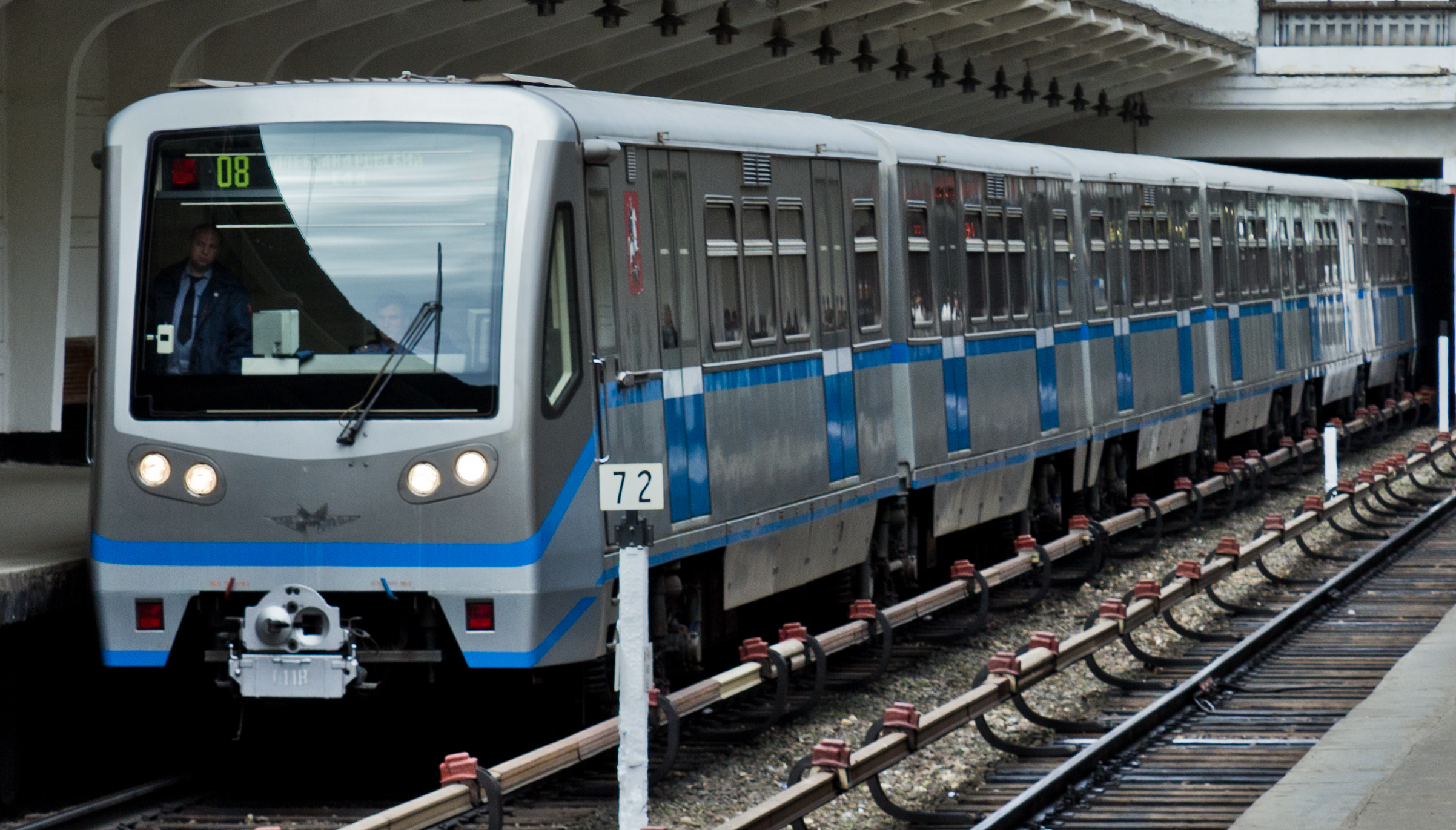
Moscow Metro, 81-740/741

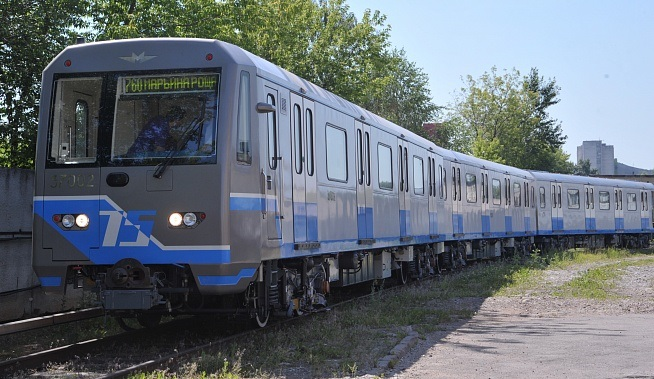
Moscow Metro, 81-760/761

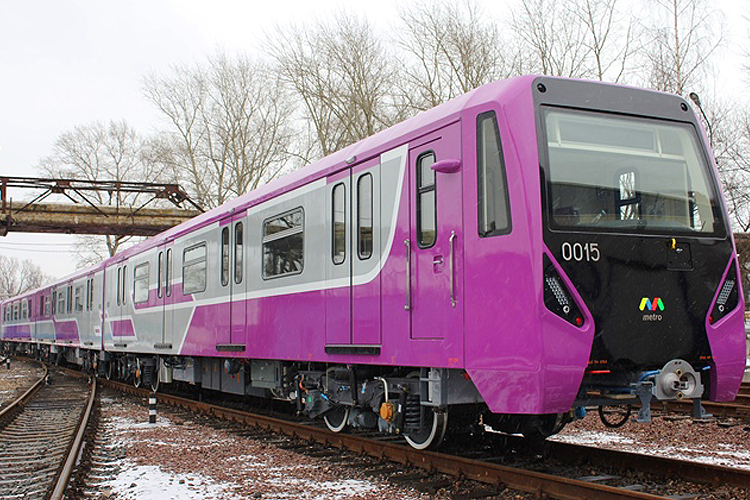
Baku Metro, 81-760B/761B/763B

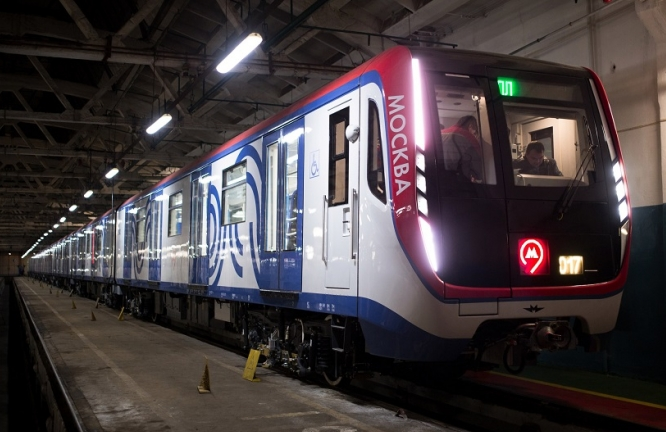
Moscow Metro, 81-765/766/767

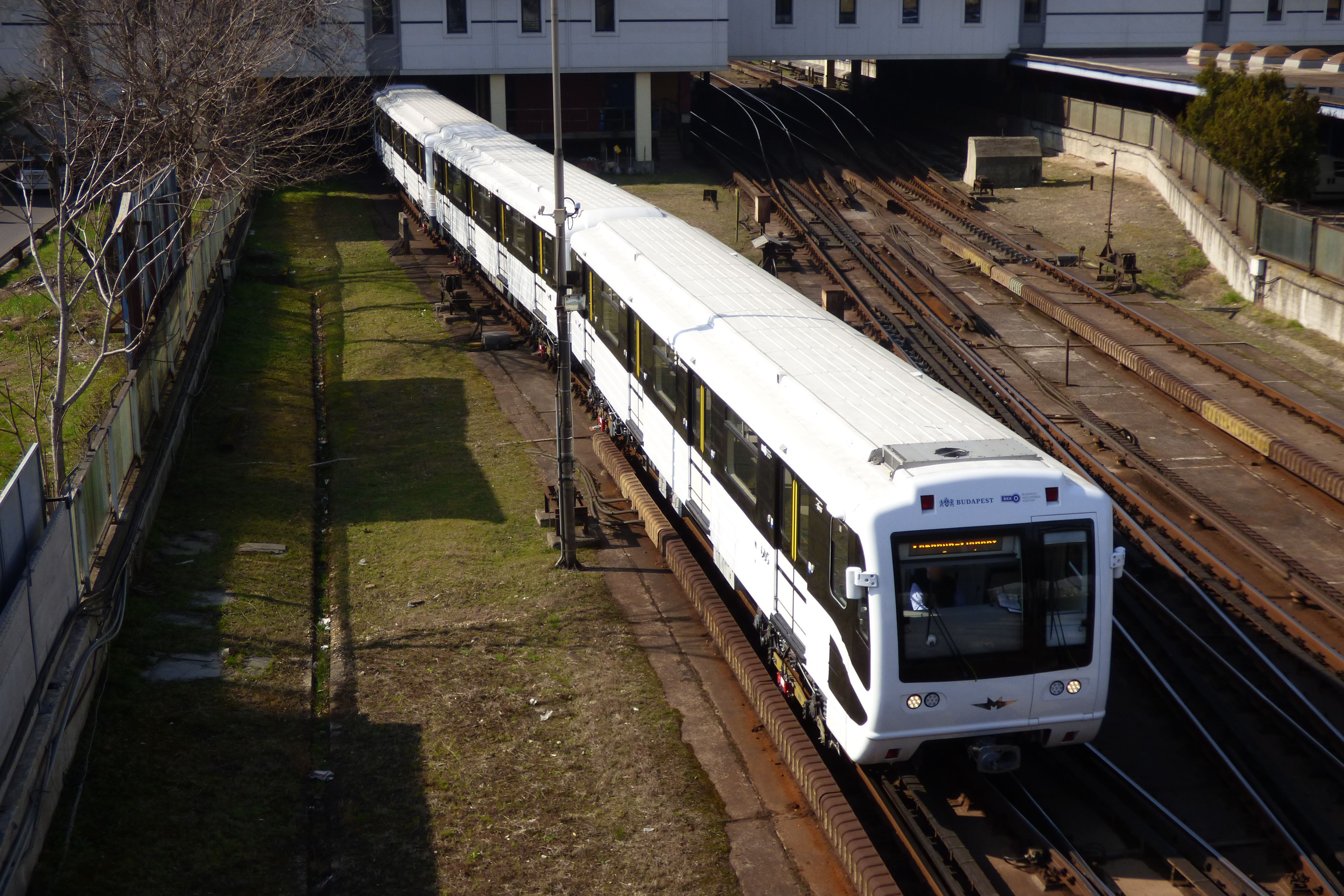
Budapest metro, 81-717.2K/714.2K

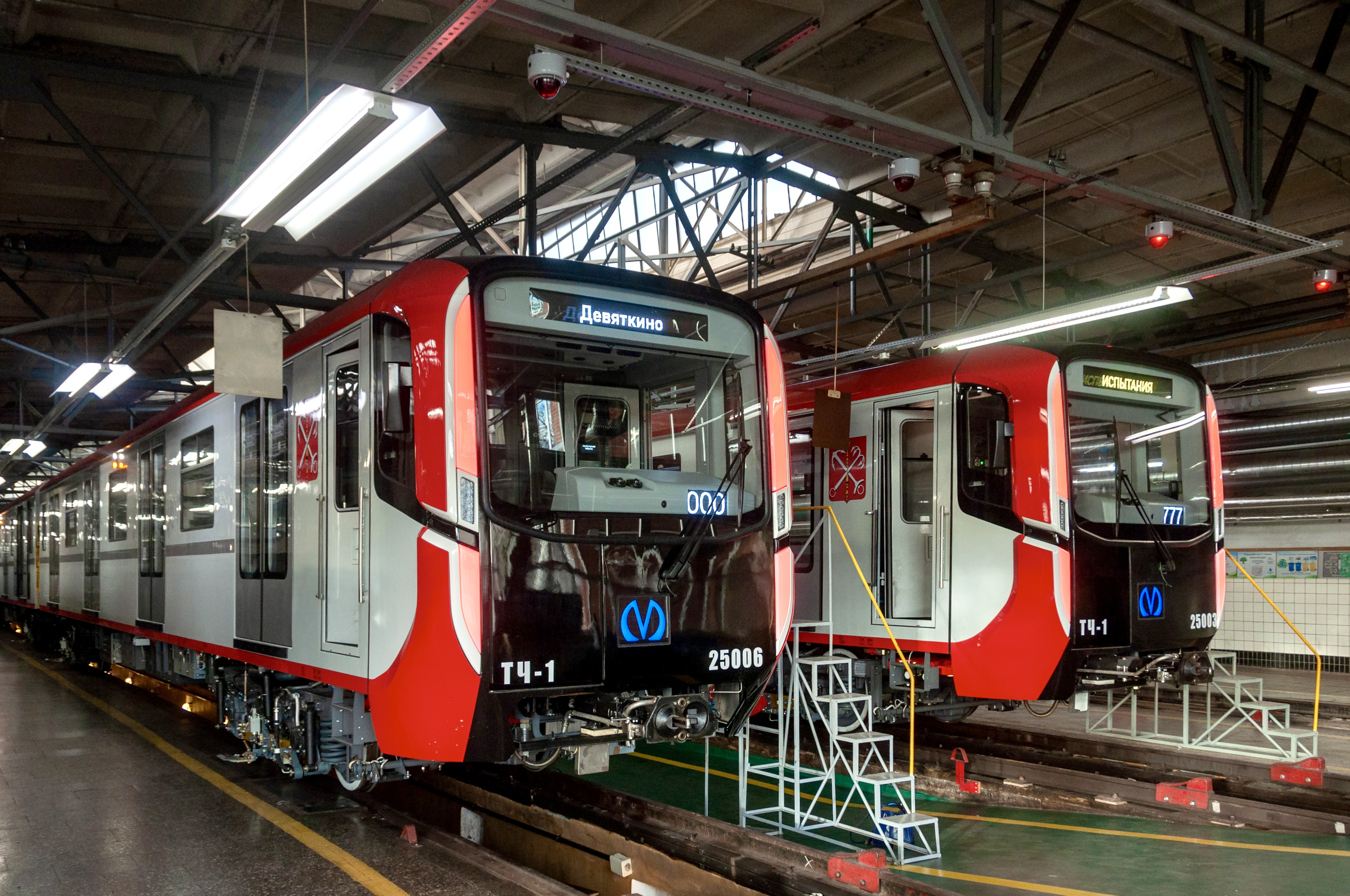
Saint Petersburg Metro,
Diesel rolling stock

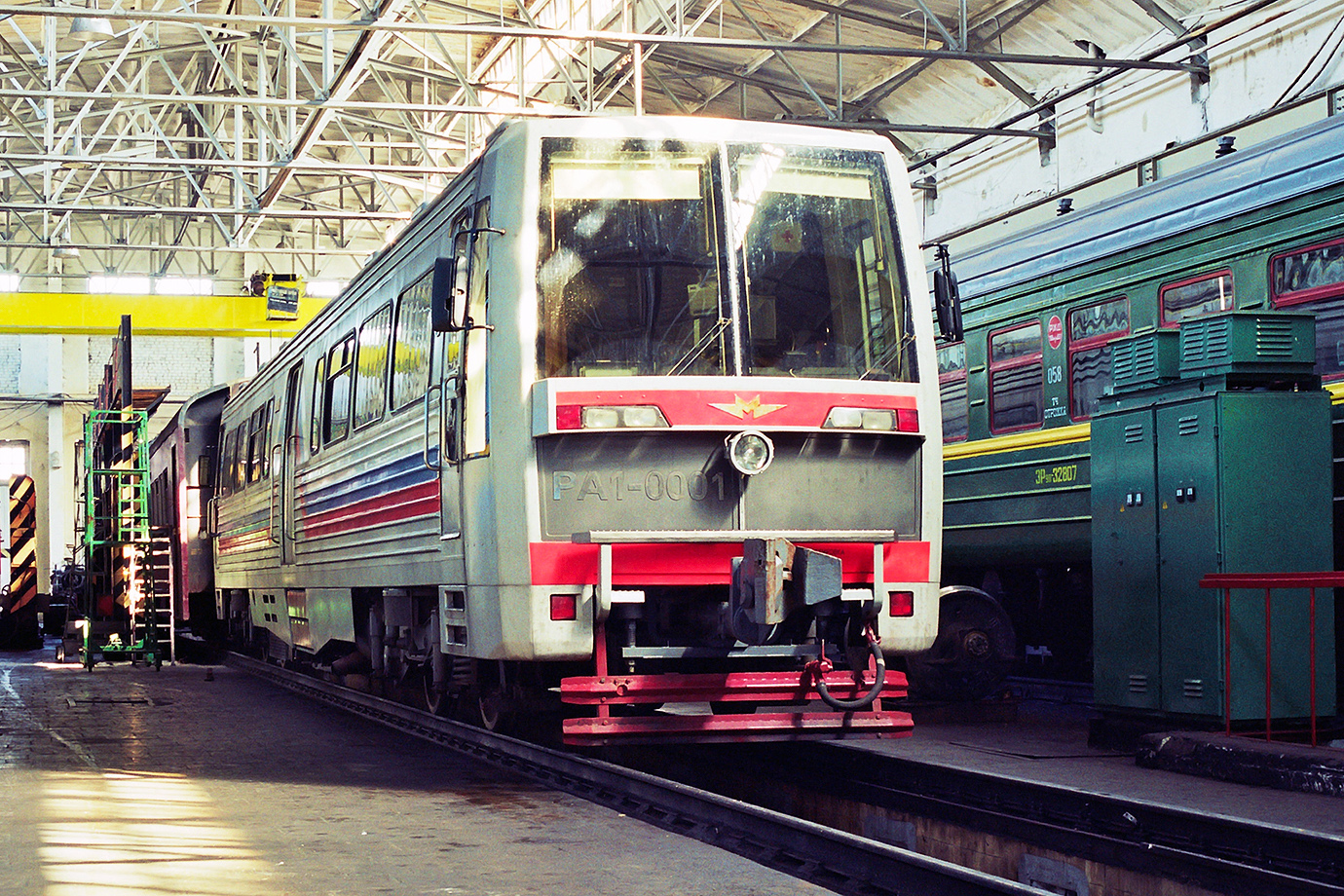
Russian Railways, RA1 (Model 730)

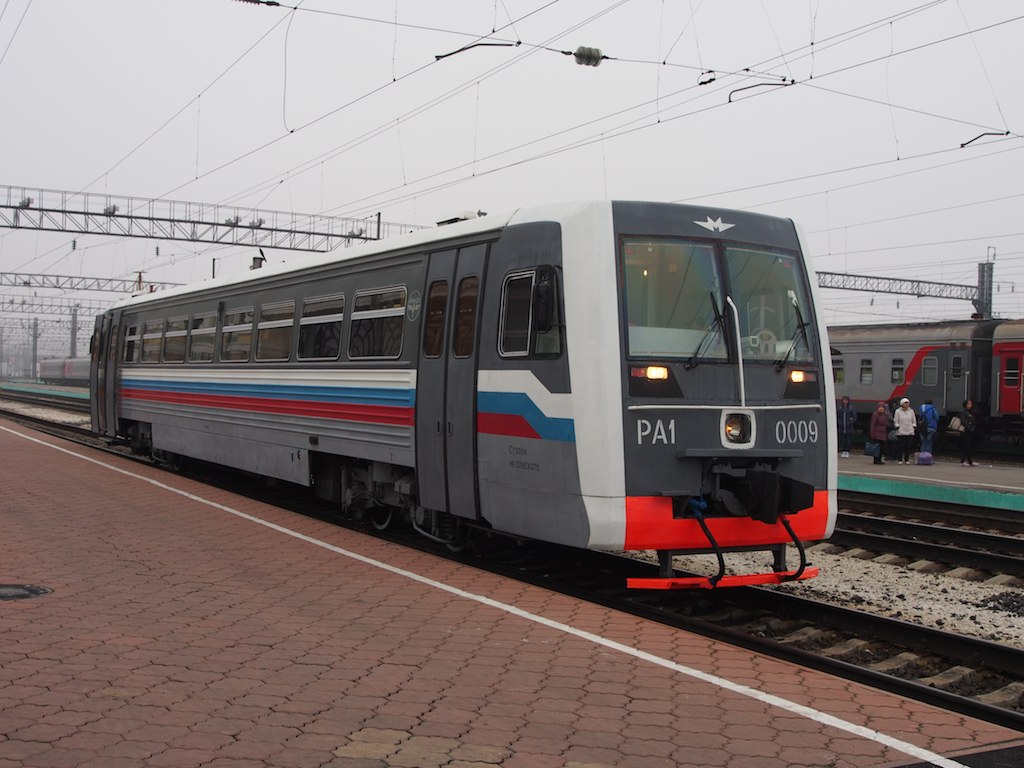
Russian Railways, RA1 (Model 731)

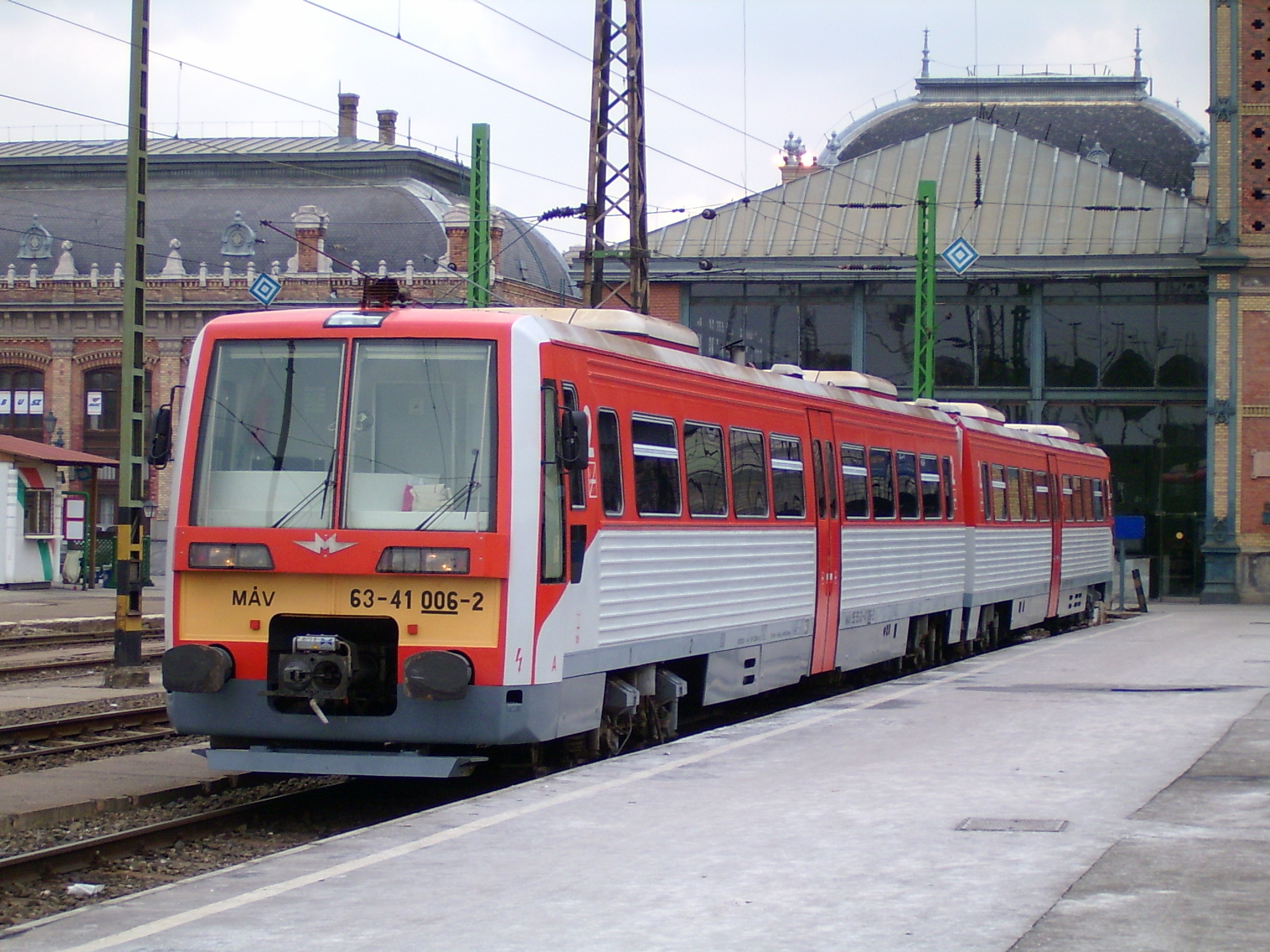
Hungarian Railways, MÁV-6341

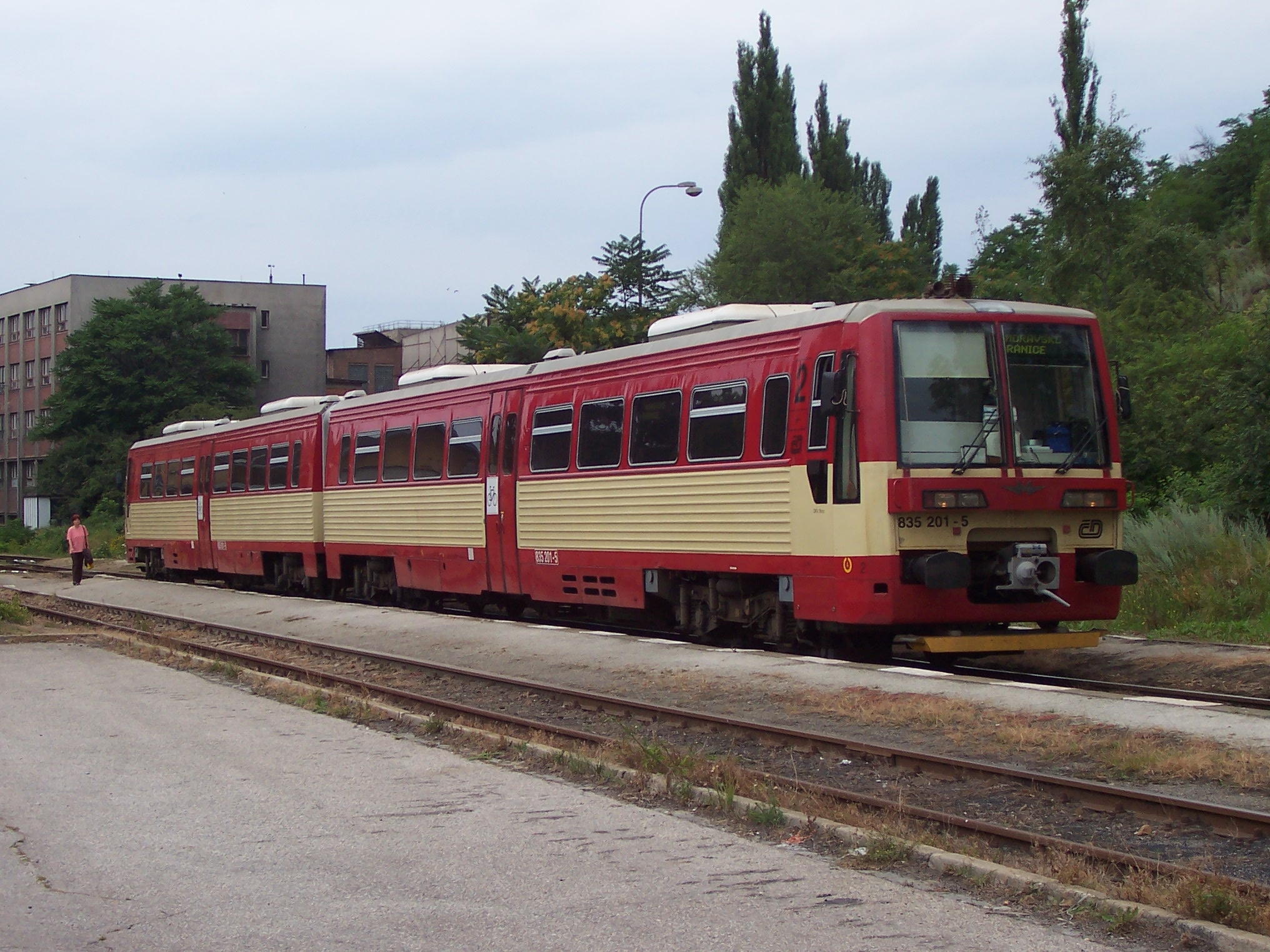
Czech Railways, Class 835

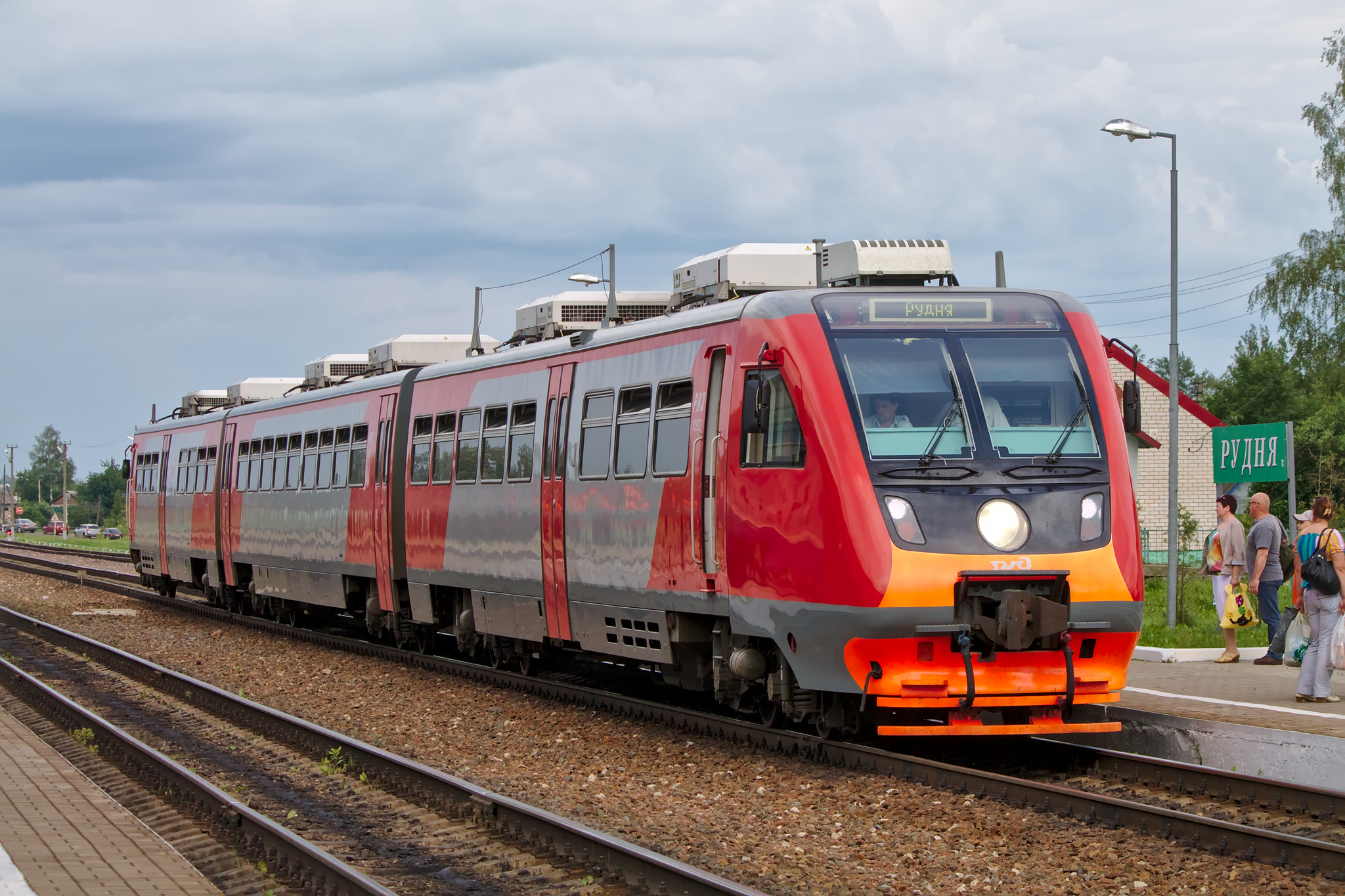
Russian Railways, RA2

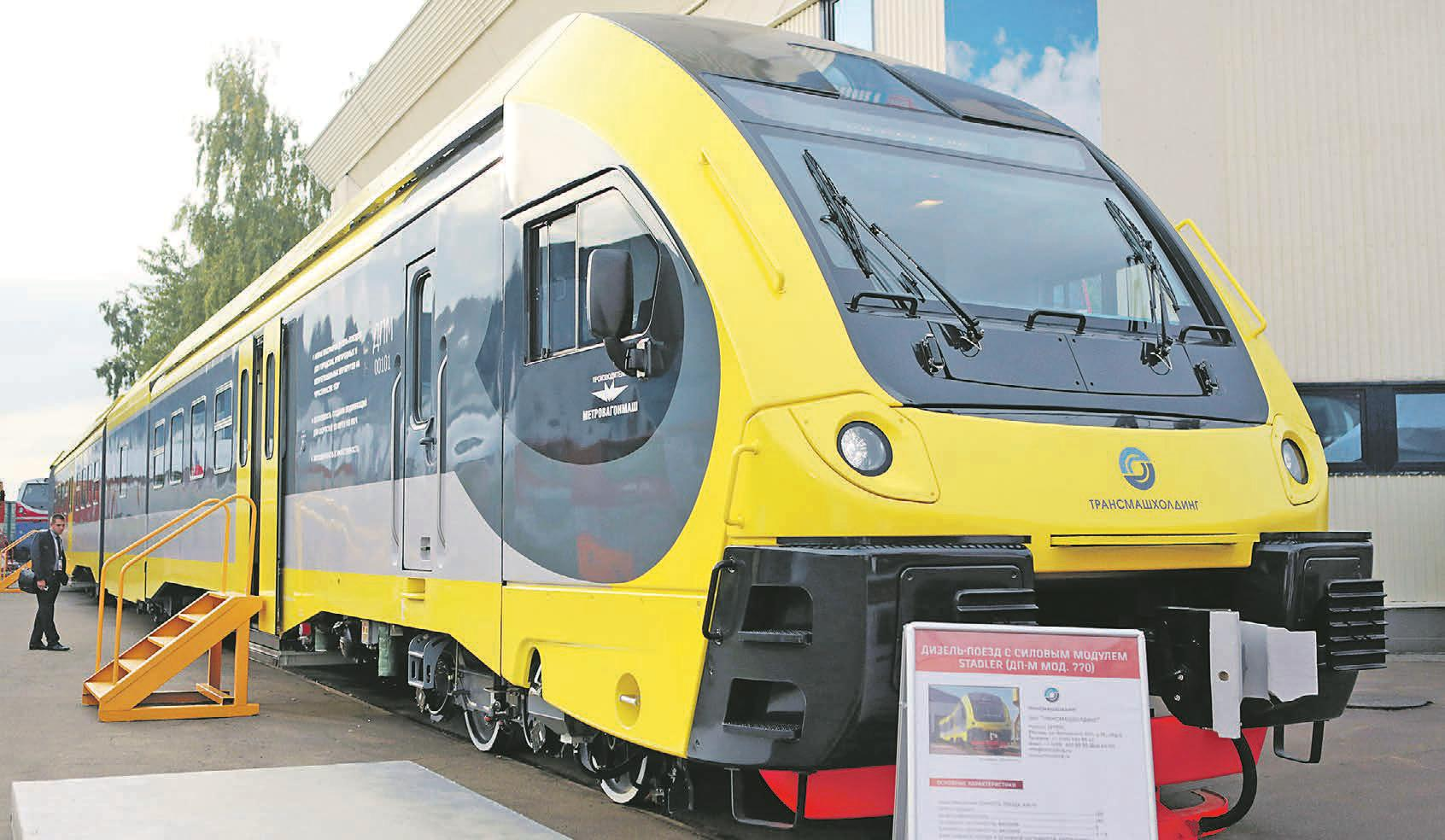
Russian Railways, DPM

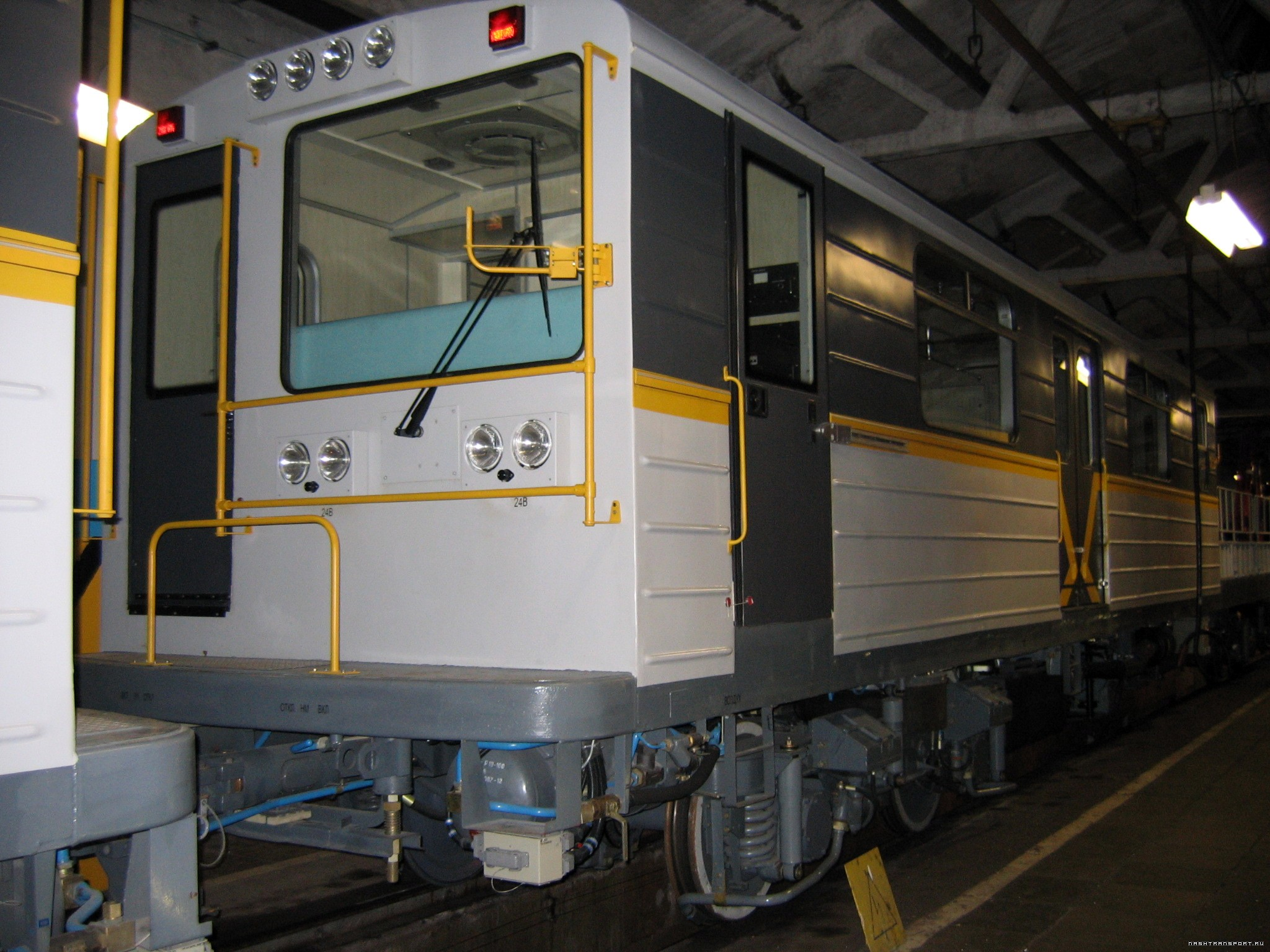
Moscow Metro, 81-730.05

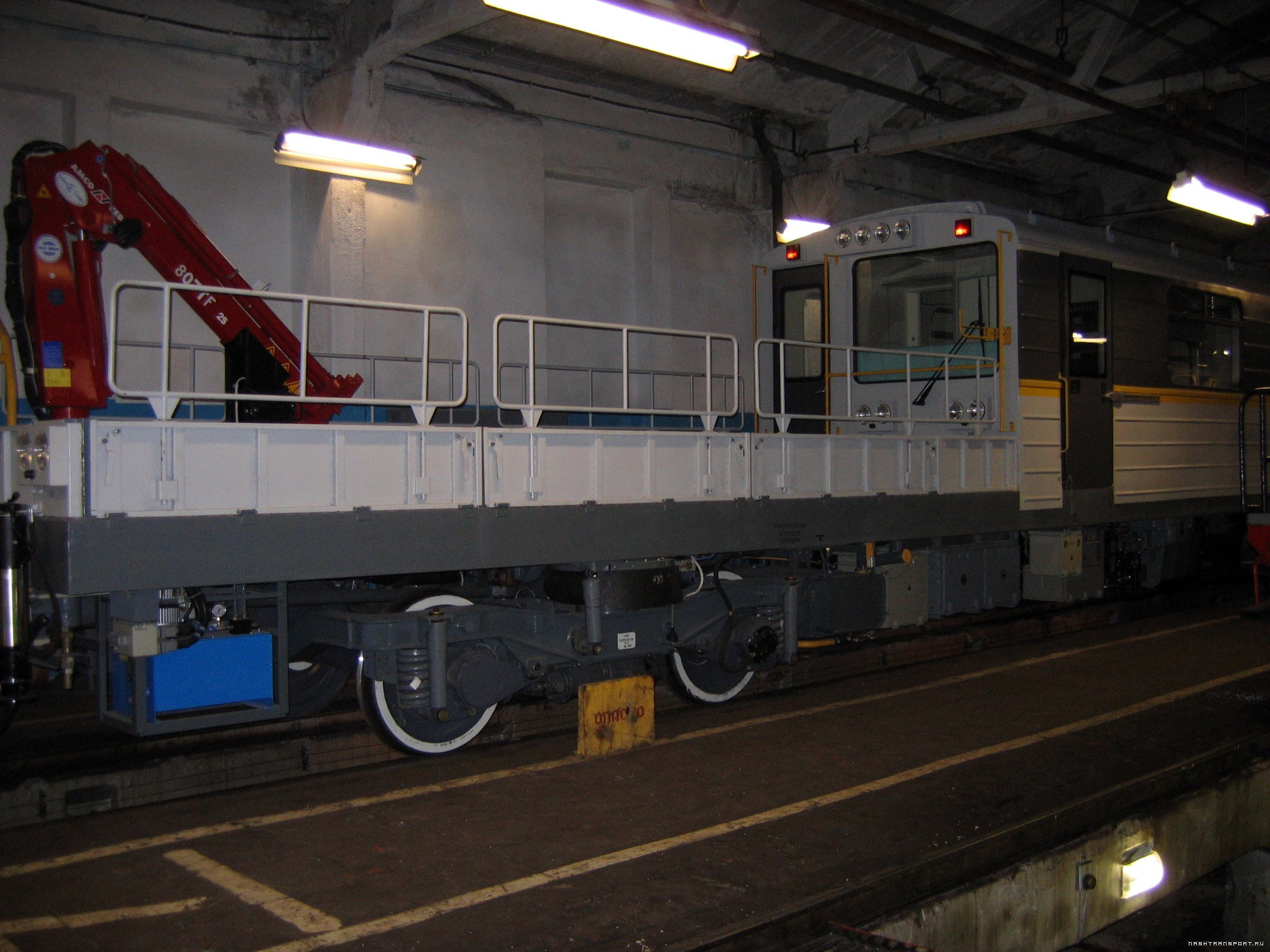
Moscow Metro, 81-730.05

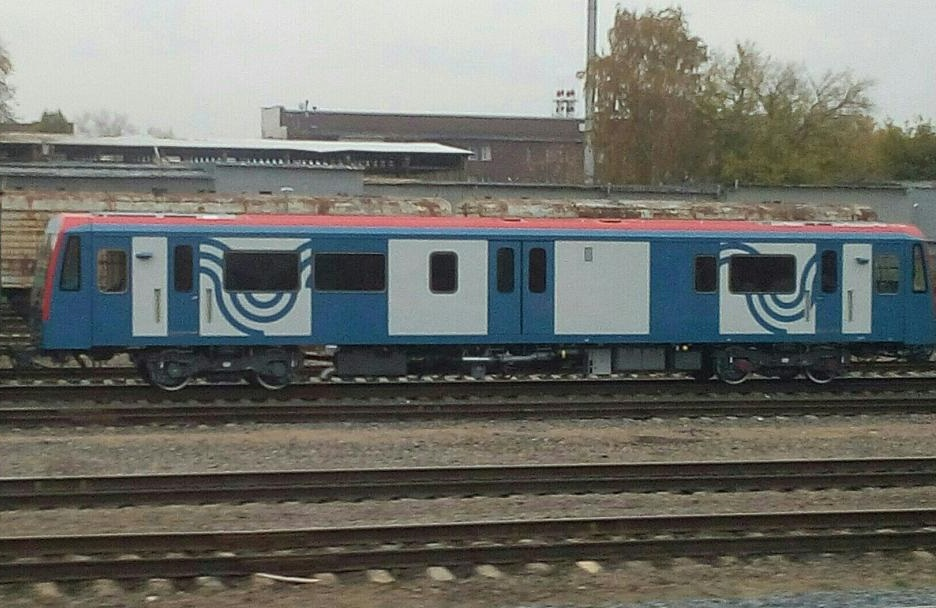
Moscow Metro, 81-7xx (760-like railcar)

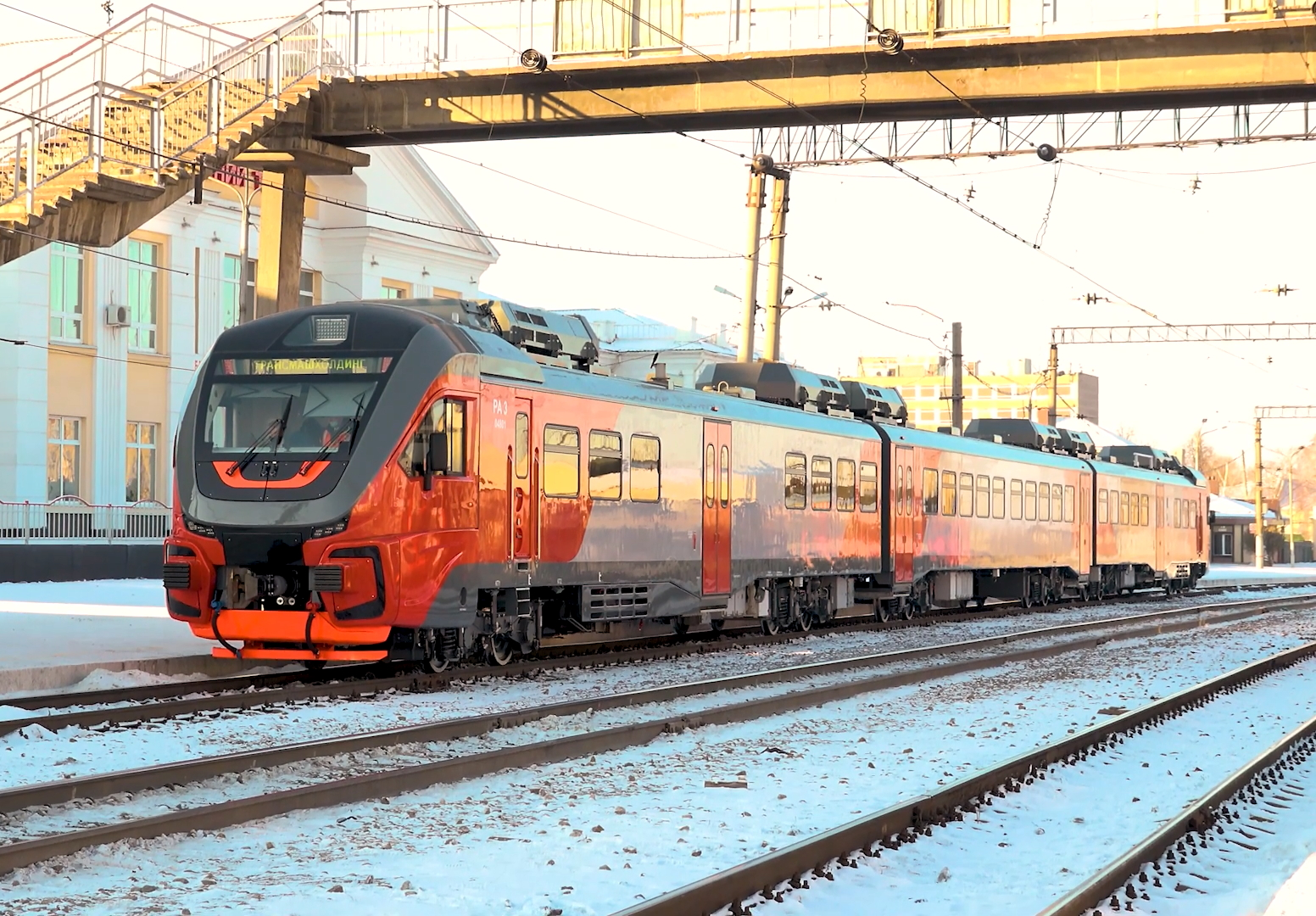
Russian Railways, RA3

== See also ==
- Rolling stock manufacturers of Russia
- The Museum of the Moscow Railway
- Transmashholding
