= 81-740/741 =

Type of rolling stock

Metrovagonmash 81-740/741
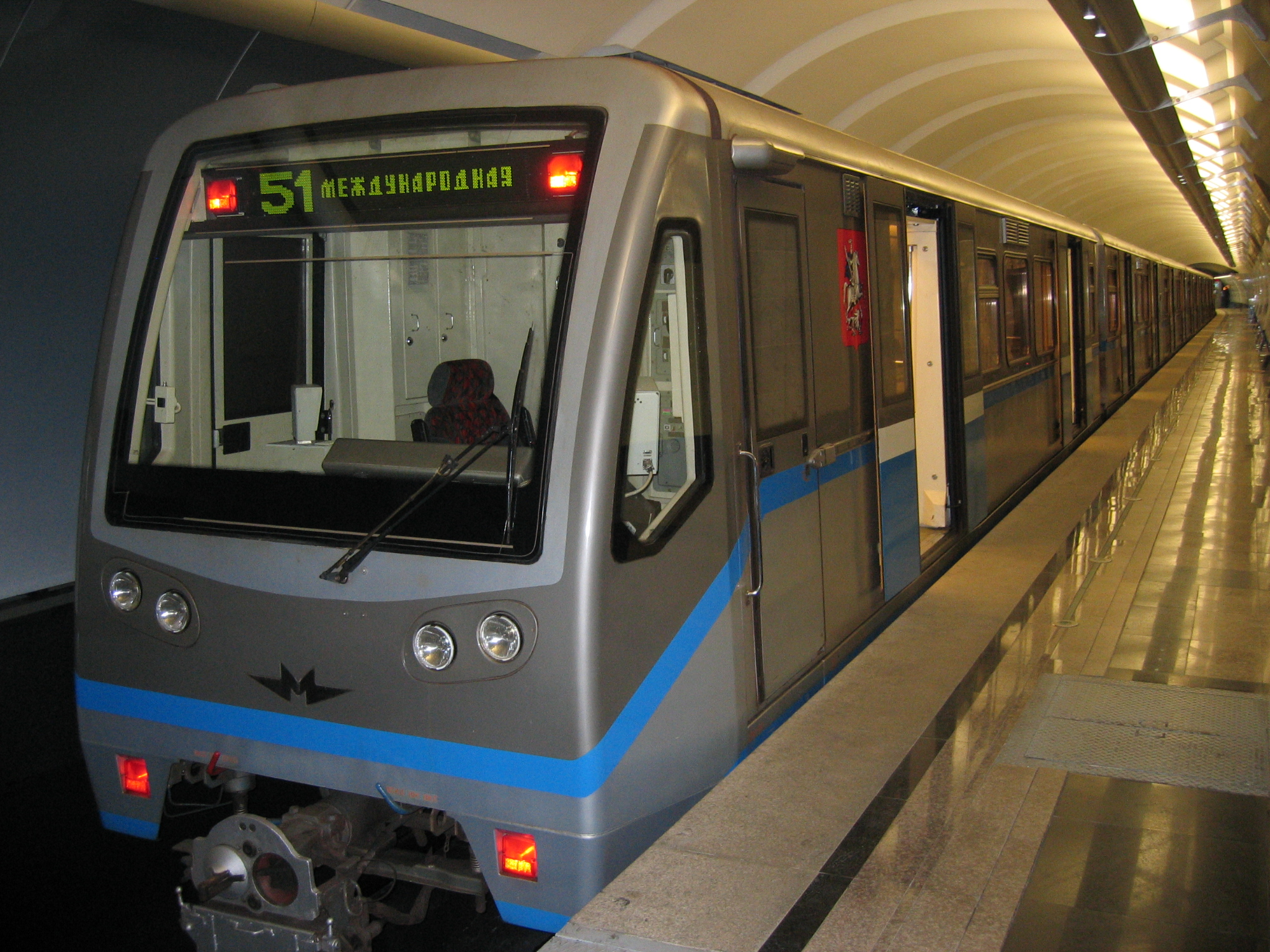
- 81-740.1/741.1 train

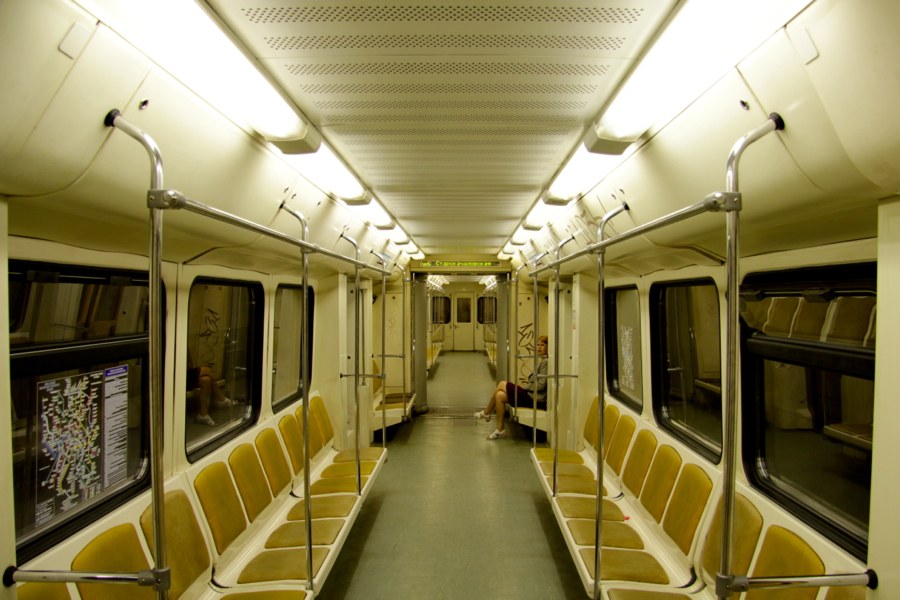
- 81-740.1/741.1 interior
- In service: 2003-present
- Manufacturer: Metrovagonmash (Russia)
- Built at: Metrovagonmash (Russia)
- Family name: 81-740 series
- Replaced: E series (E, Ezh, Em); 81-717 series
- Constructed: 2002-2013 (all modifications)
- Entered service: 2003
- Predecessor: 81-720 series
- Successor: 81-760 series
- Capacity: 344/370 passengers (353/382 for .4(K) and .2B)
- Operators: Moskovsky Metropoliten, Kazan Metro, Sofia Metro
- Depots: Moscow Metro: MPD-1 Severnoye; MPD-3 Izmaylovo; MPD-4 Krasnaya Presnya; MPD-8 Varshavskoye; MPD-16 Mitino; Kazan Metro: Ametyevo; Sofia Metro: Obelya Depot
- Lines served: Moscow Metro: Sokolnicheskaya line Arbatsko-Pokrovskaya line Butovskaya line Sofia Metro: 1 2 4 Kazan Metro: All lines

Specifications
- Car length: 28.15 m (92 ft 4 1/4 in)/27.2 m (89 ft 2 7/8 in)
- Width: 2.7 m (8 ft 10 1/4 in)
- Height: 3.57 m (11 ft 8 1/2 in)
- Articulated sections: Two sections per car
- Maximum speed: 90 km/h (56 mph)
- Weight: 47 t (46 long tons; 52 short tons)/46 t (45 long tons; 51 short tons)
- Traction system: IGBT-VVVF inverter Metrovagonmash KATP-1 (Moscow Metro, Kazan Metro); Hitachi VFI-HD2420D (Sofia Metro)
- Traction motors: AC asynchronous motor 4EFA 1832B (81-740/741); DATE-170-4U2 (81-740.1/741.1); TAD 280M4 U2 (81-740A/741A, 81-740.1/741.1, 81-740.4/741.4); HS35531-01RB (81-740.2/741.2)
- Power output: 640 kW (860 hp) or 680 kW (910 hp)
- Acceleration: 1.3 m/s^{2} (2.9 mph/s)
- Deceleration: 1.1 m/s^{2} (2.5 mph/s)
- Electric system: 825 V DC
- Bogies: 3 two-axle bogies (2 motorized bogies)
- Braking systems: Dynamic brakes (rheostatic and regenerative), electro-pneumatic
- Coupling system: Scharfenberg coupler
- Multiple working: Min 2x 81-740 car, max 81-740 + 3x 81-741 + 81-740 cars. Train + train configuration is not used in regular service.
- Track gauge: 1,520 mm (4 ft 11 27/32 in) Russian gauge 1,435 mm (4 ft 8 1/2 in) standard gauge

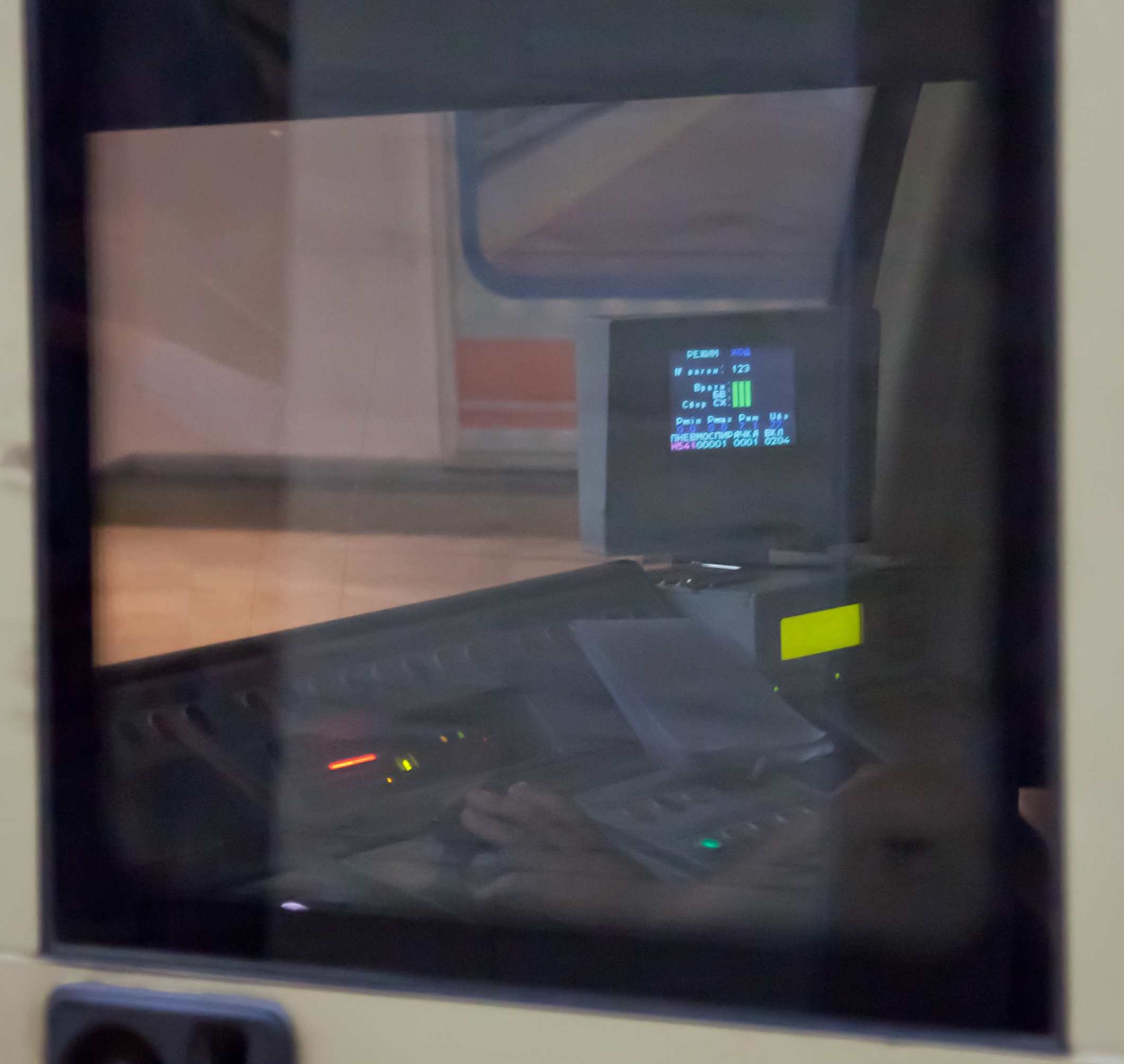
Control panel

81-740/741 (Rusich, Russian: Русич), is a type of rolling stock specially designed for running under the harsh winter climate of outdoor Moscow. Rusich also features a corridor connection, allowing passenger access between the two sections of the cars. It was first designed for use on proposed light metro lines such as the Butovskaya line in Moscow (which ended up being the only light metro line built), being similar in nature to some high floor two-segment articulated trams like the rolling stock of the Los Angeles Metro Rail, the Tyne and Wear Metro, and Docklands Light Railway rolling stock in London.

They are currently operated in the Sokolnicheskaya, Arbatsko-Pokrovskaya, and Butovskaya lines of Moscow Metro as well as the Kazan Metro. Outside Russia, they are operated in lines M1, M2 and M4 of the Sofia Metro in Bulgaria.

Four main types of Rusich rolling stock were manufactured. 81-740/741, 81-740.1/741.1; 81-740.4/741.4 which are used on the Moscow Metro and in Kazan Metro on the wide Russian gauge, the later having an extra door in the cabless segments. 81-740.2/741.2, 81-740.2B/741.2B is technically adapted and designed for Sofia Metro which uses standard gauge. Besides the 81-717/714 and its derivatives/modifications, it is the only train made by Metrowagonmash to be used outside the former USSR, in the European Union, and to get a modification for a different track gauge.

Its automatic train operation and universal control panel were designed by Tikhomirov Scientific Research Institute of Instrument Design (NIIP).
