= 81-720/721 =

Subway car model for the Moscow Metro

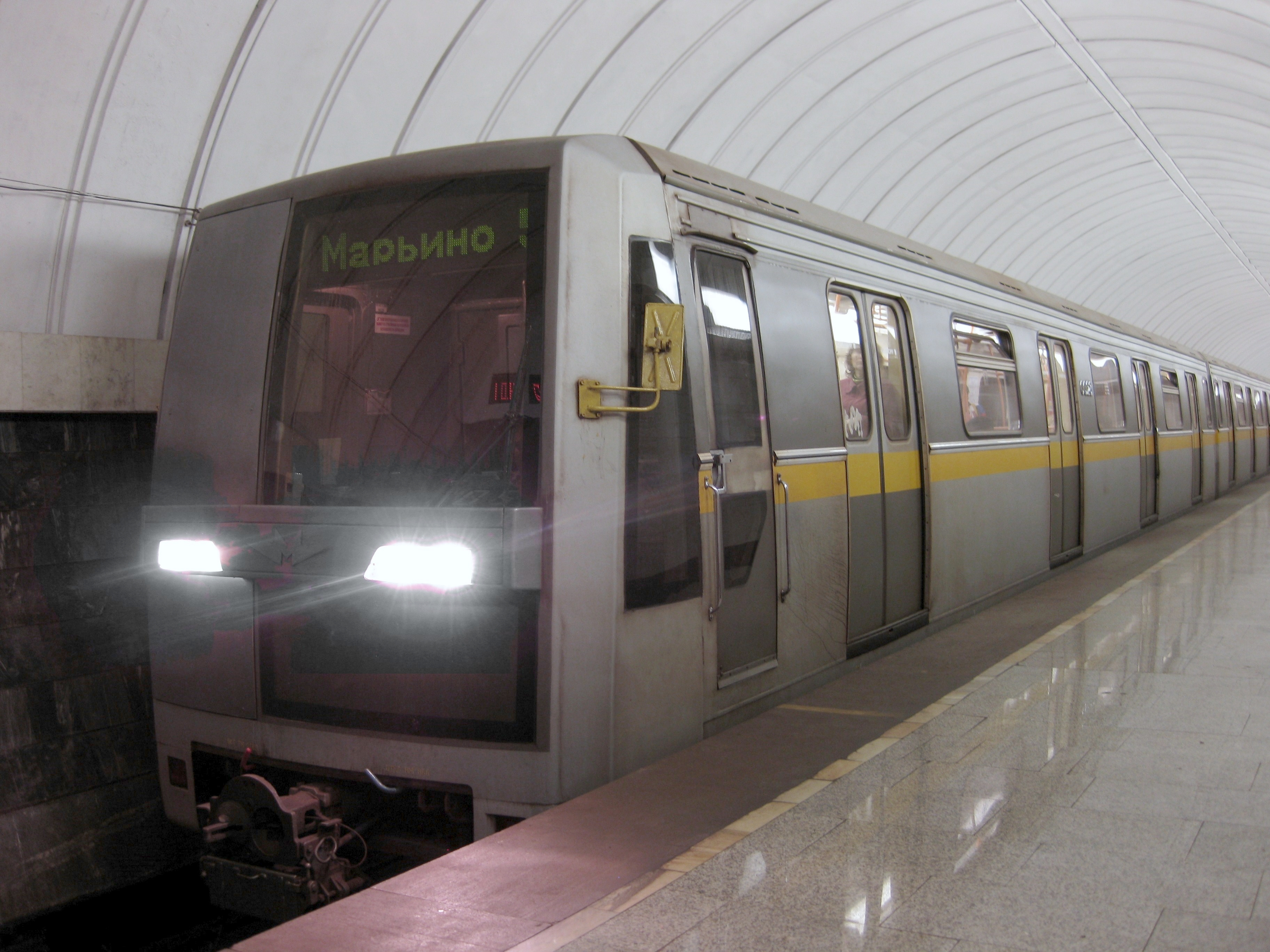
- In service: 10 June 1998-2 August 2019
- Manufacturer: Metrovagonmash
- Built at: Metrovagonmash
- Family name: 81-720 series
- Replaced: 81-717 series
- Constructed: 1991-2004
- Entered service: 1998
- Refurbished: 2013
- Scrapped: 2018–2019
- Number built: 91 (cars)
- Number in service: Not in use
- Predecessor: 81-717 series
- Successor: 81-740 series
- Formation: 2 to 8 cars
- Capacity: 330/350 passengers
- Operator: Moskovsky Metropoliten

Specifications
- Car body construction: Aluminium
- Train length: 155 meters (in 8 wagons version)
- Car length: 20 m (65 ft 7 3/8 in)/19.21 m (63 ft 1/4 in)
- Width: 2.7 m (8 ft 10 1/4 in)
- Height: 3.644 m (11 ft 11 1/2 in)
- Doors: 8
- Maximum speed: 100 km/h (62 mph)
- Weight: 34.5 t (34.0 long tons; 38.0 short tons)/33 t (32 long tons; 36 short tons)
- Traction system: Metrowagonmash KATP-1/KAETP-1 IGBT-VVVF
- Power output: 660 kW (890 hp)
- Acceleration: 1.3 m/s^{2} (4.3 ft/s^{2})
- Deceleration: 1.3 m/s^{2} (4.3 ft/s^{2})
- Safety systems: SKIF (СКИФ), ALS-ARS (АЛС-АРС)
- Track gauge: 1,520 mm (4 ft 11 27/32 in) Russian gauge

81-720/721 (Yauza, alternatively spelled as Jauza, Russian: Яуза), is a subway car model used by the Moscow Metro. The origins of the design go back to 1987, and the first train was built in 1990–1991. Production of "Yauza" was discontinued in 2002 due to ongoing reliability issues. Now «Yauza» is not in use in part of many problems with braking and ALS-ARS systems (Automatic Train Signalization with Automatic Speed Control)

== History ==
The automated train control system "Vityaz-1" was developed by JSC Tikhomirov Scientific Research Institute of Instrument Design.

In 1993, at the Polezhaevskaya subway station, Russian president Boris Yeltsin, Prime Minister V.S. Chernomyrdin, and Moscow Mayor Yuri Luzhkov attended the ceremony marking the debut of the new trains, consisting of 81-720 (lead) and 81-721 (intermediate) cars numbered 001-002-003-004-005.

The new cars deviated significantly from the traditional design. The body is made of stainless steel, painted in a yellow-gray color scheme as opposed to the traditional blue color scheme used on previous models. The lead cars had a distinctive modern design at the cab end. Other improvements included the addition of ceiling fans (as opposed to air ducts used on the older series cars), cab air conditioning and heating systems, more standee room (increasing the capacity of each car by 30 - 40 people), bigger cab, and a new design of the trucks. The original design featured padded bench seats matching the contours of the human back, however this design was soon dropped and subsequent models were built with the standard anti-vandal plastic seats. The cars had DC-120 type traction motors (4 per car) and a thyristor-pulse control system developed by AEC "Dynamo", as well as regenerative braking, recycling energy back into the third rail, allowing the cars to operate smoother, quieter, and more efficiently. The maximum design speed was increased to 100 km/h (62 mph) vs 90 km/h (56 mph) for the 81-717/714 and earlier classes of cars due.

The cars featured an automatic sprinkler system that would instantly form a water cloud inside the car in the event of a fire, however there are also fire extinguishers in each car.

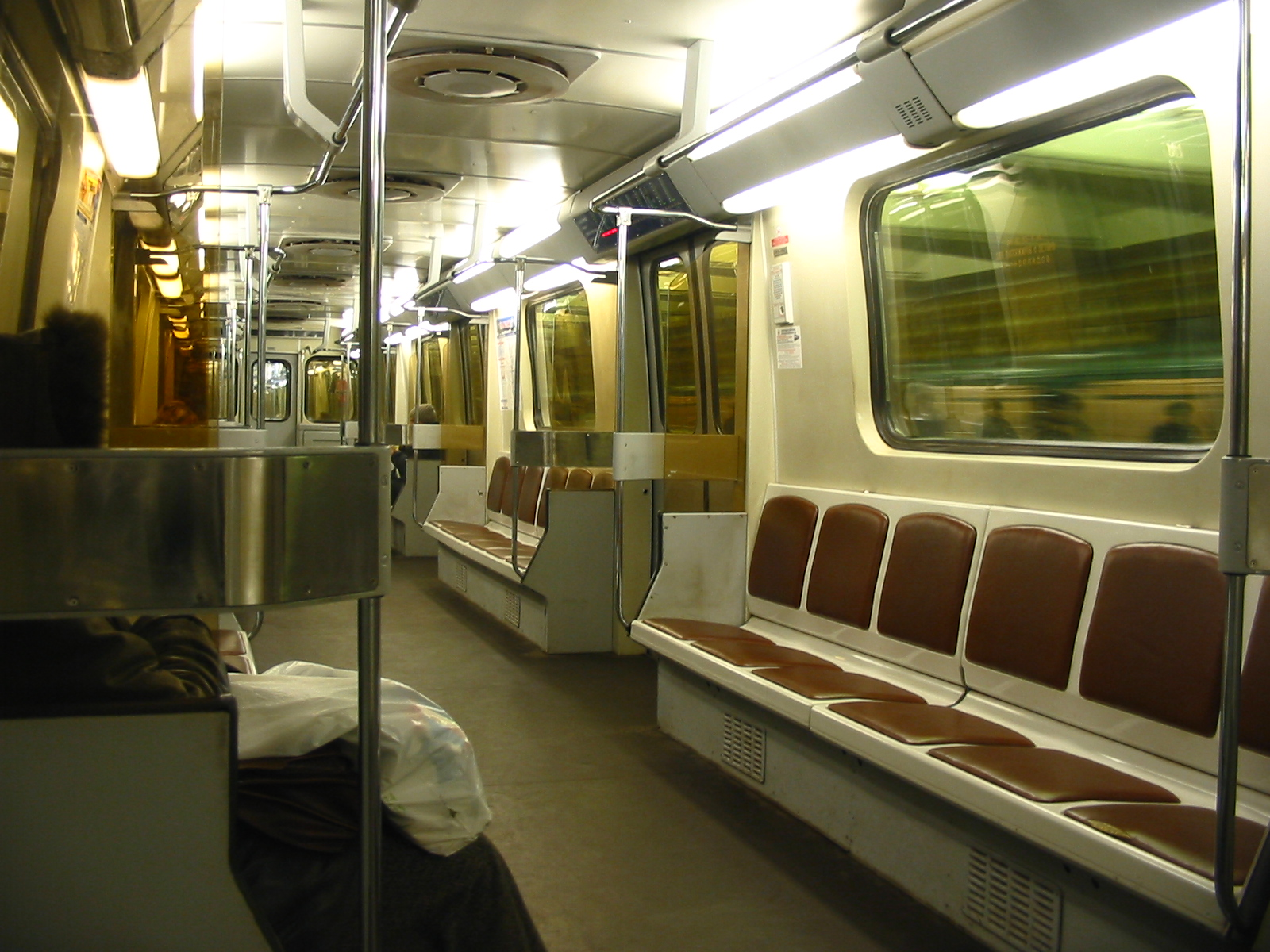
Interior, first generation (1990-s)

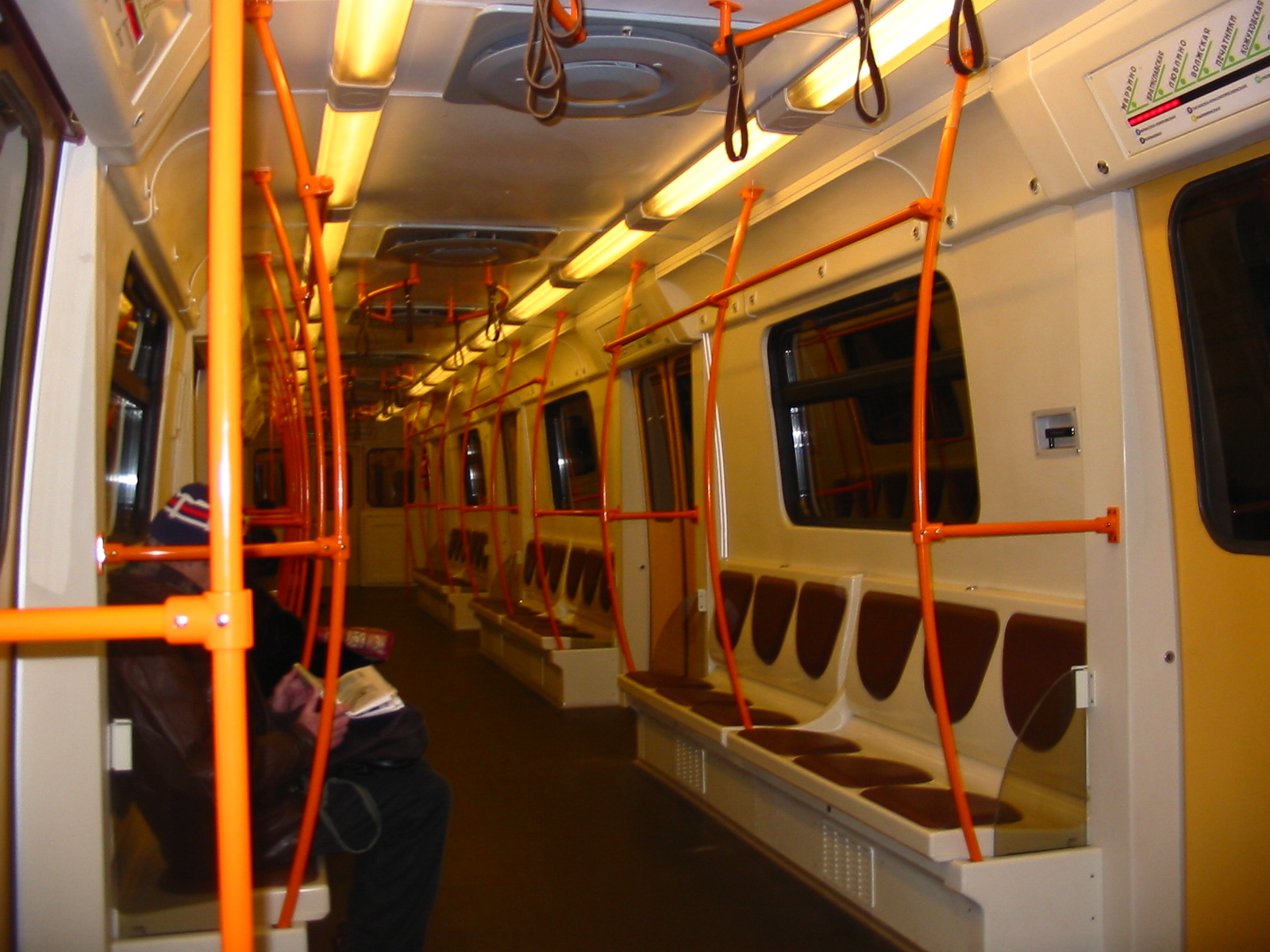
Interior, second generation (2004), with Line 10 "route display"

In late 1992, a new experimental version of Yauza came out, equipped with Dinamo-made AC traction motors. Tests were carried out in the suburban ring VNIIZhT Sherbinka. Since there is no third rail at the test site, the train was temporarily fitted with a pantograph to collect power from overhead wires, which were set to provide 850 V of current. Unfortunately, the cars have not been completely trouble-free. Often numerous mechanical or structural difficulties were encountered.

The Yauza trains operated regularly on the Kakhovskaya until 2019 and Lublin-Dmitrov lines: 6 81-720/721 trains built between 1991 and 2002 on Kakhovskaya line and 3 81-720.1/721.1 trains built in 2004 on Lyublinsko-Dmitrovskaya line. No further production runs were made and the Moscow Metro chose instead to purchase more 81-717/714.5M and brand new 81-740/741 models. The rest of the service on the Lublin-Dmitrov line is provided by 81-717/714.5M and 81-717/714.6K trains. It is planned to eventually transfer all 81-720/721.1 cars to the Kakhovskaya line.

Several surplus 81-720/721 cars remained on JSC "Metrovagonmash" property until 2010, before being scrapped to give space for the ongoing production of the future 81-760/761 cars, and one 81-721 car remained stored in the "Krasnaya Presnya" depot prior to disposal in August 2013. The remaining cars would later be scrapped due to reliability issues, with the final train being withdrawn in August 2019. The last set, which was under preservation, was severely damaged in a rear-end collision with an 81-717 at Pechatniki during an empty coaching stock move on 11 October 2023.

== Gallery ==
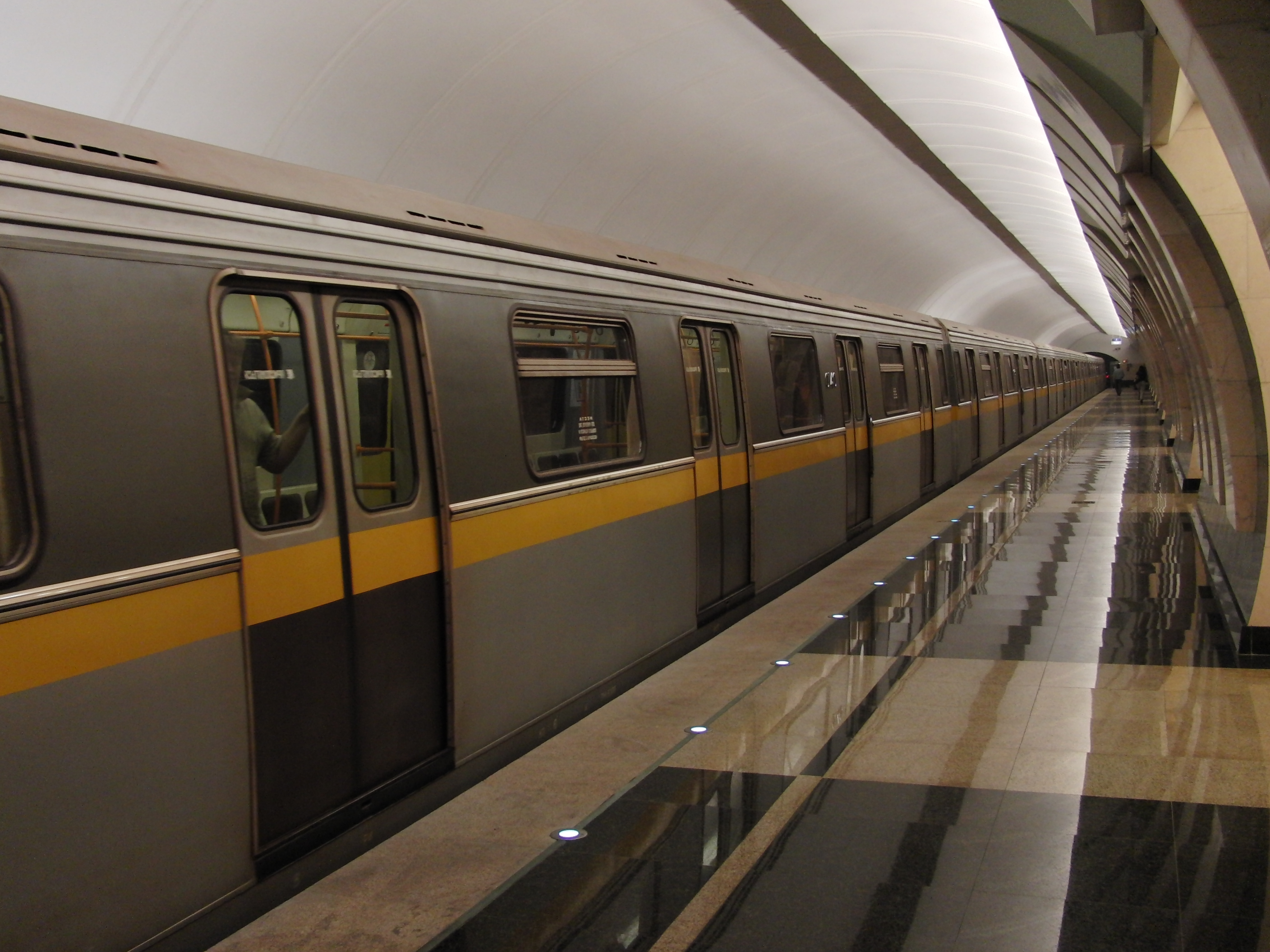
Metro wagons.

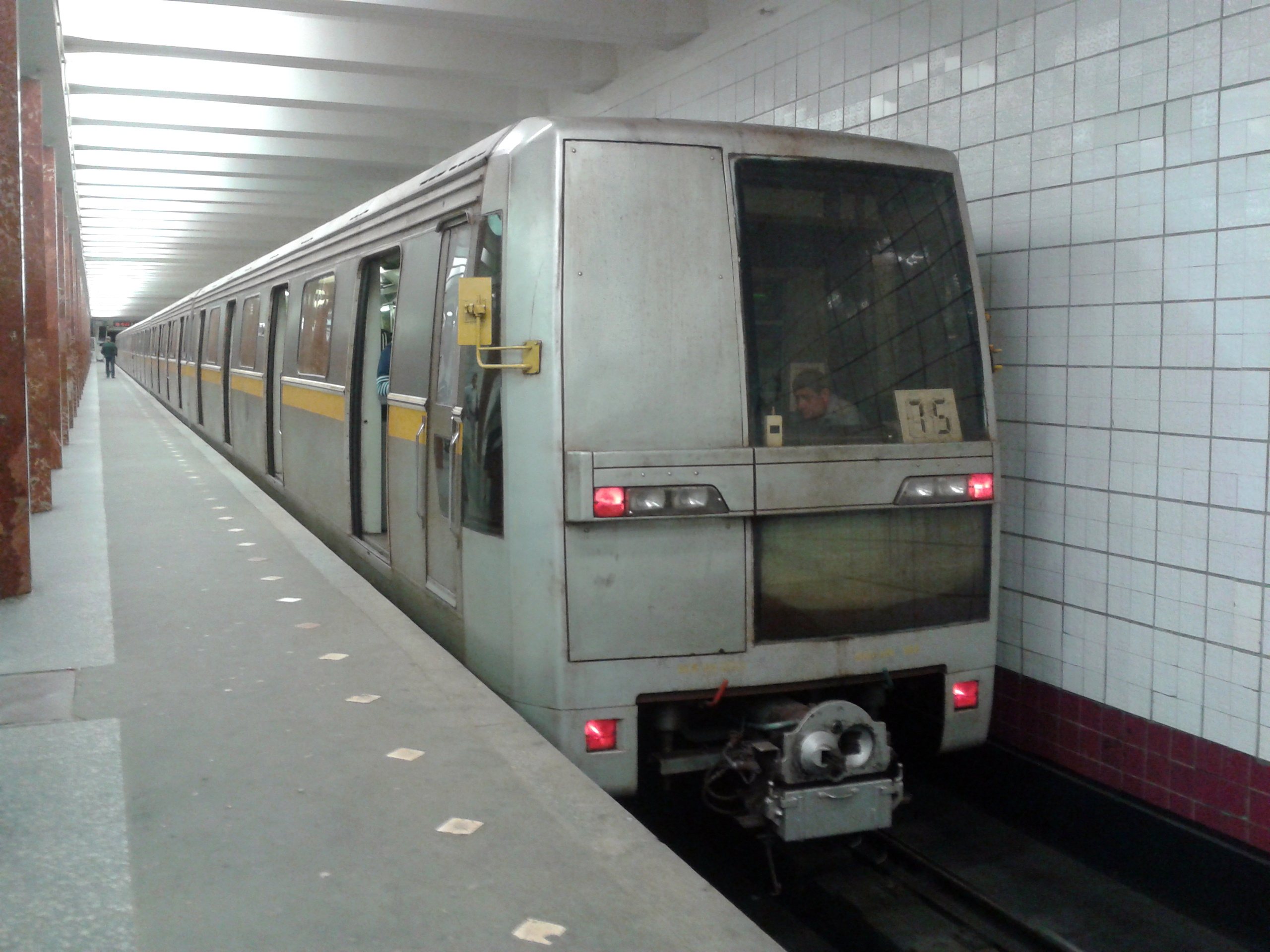
End wagon with glowing stoplights.

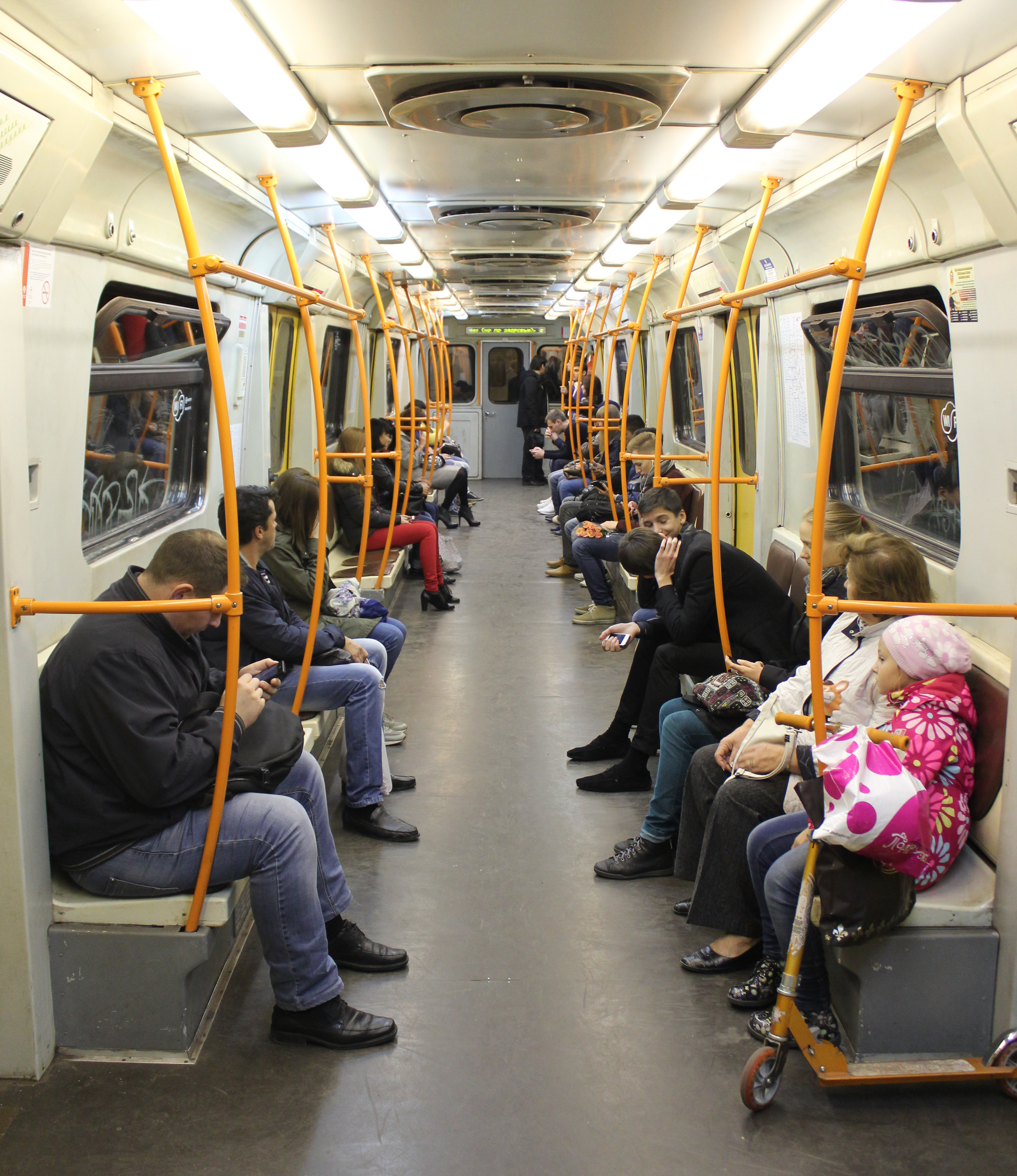
Salon view.
