= 81-760/761 =

Class of Russian subway car

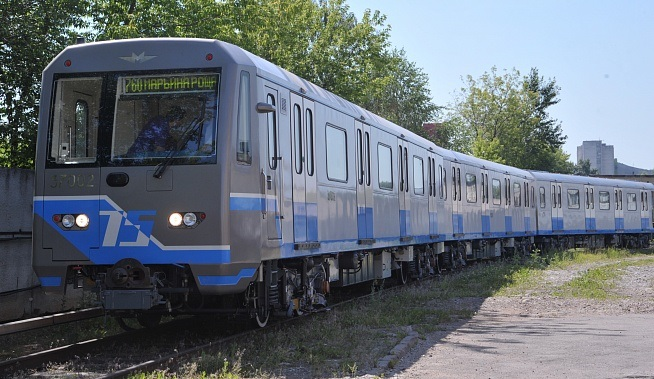
- 81-760/761 "Oka" at the depot
- In service: 2012 — present
- Manufacturer: Transmashholding (Russia)
- Built at: Metrowagonmash (Russia)
- Family name: 81-760 series
- Replaced: 81-714 series
- Constructed: 2010—2016
- Entered service: 2012
- Predecessor: 81-740 series
- Successor: 81-765 series
- Operator: Moskovsky Metropoliten
- Lines served: Moscow Metro: Kaluzhsko-Rizhskaya line Kalininskaya line Solntsevskaya line Serpukhovsko-Timiryazevskaya line

Specifications
- Car length: 20.12 m (66 ft 1/8 in)/19.14 m (62 ft 9 1/2 in)
- Width: 2.69 m (8 ft 9 7/8 in)
- Height: 3.68 m (12 ft 7/8 in)
- Maximum speed: 90 km/h (56 mph)
- Weight: 38 t (37 long tons; 42 short tons)/36 t (35 long tons; 40 short tons)
- Traction system: Metrowagonmash KATP-1/2 IGBT-VVVF
- Traction motors: AC asynchronous motor TADV-280-4 U2, DTA-170, DATM-2 U2 or HS35533-01RB
- Power output: 680 kW (910 hp)
- Acceleration: 1.3 m/s^{2} (4.3 ft/s^{2})
- Deceleration: 1.1 m/s^{2} (3.6 ft/s^{2})
- Electric system: 825 V DC
- Bogies: 2 two-axle bogies
- Braking systems: Dynamic brakes (rheostatic and regenerative), electro-pneumatic
- Coupling system: Scharfenberg coupler
- Multiple working: Min 2x 81-760 car, max 81-760 + 6x 81-761 + 81-760 cars. Train + train configuration is not available.
- Track gauge: 1,520 mm (4 ft 11 27/32 in) Russian gauge

81-760/761 (Oka, Russian: Ока́, IPA: [ɐˈka]) is a model of subway car used on the Moscow Metro. It was designed by Metrowagonmash and is manufactured by Metrovagonmash and Tver Carriage Works.
