= Metrovagonmash Ečs =

Oldest type of vehicle operated in Prague

Metrowagonmash Ečs (81-709)
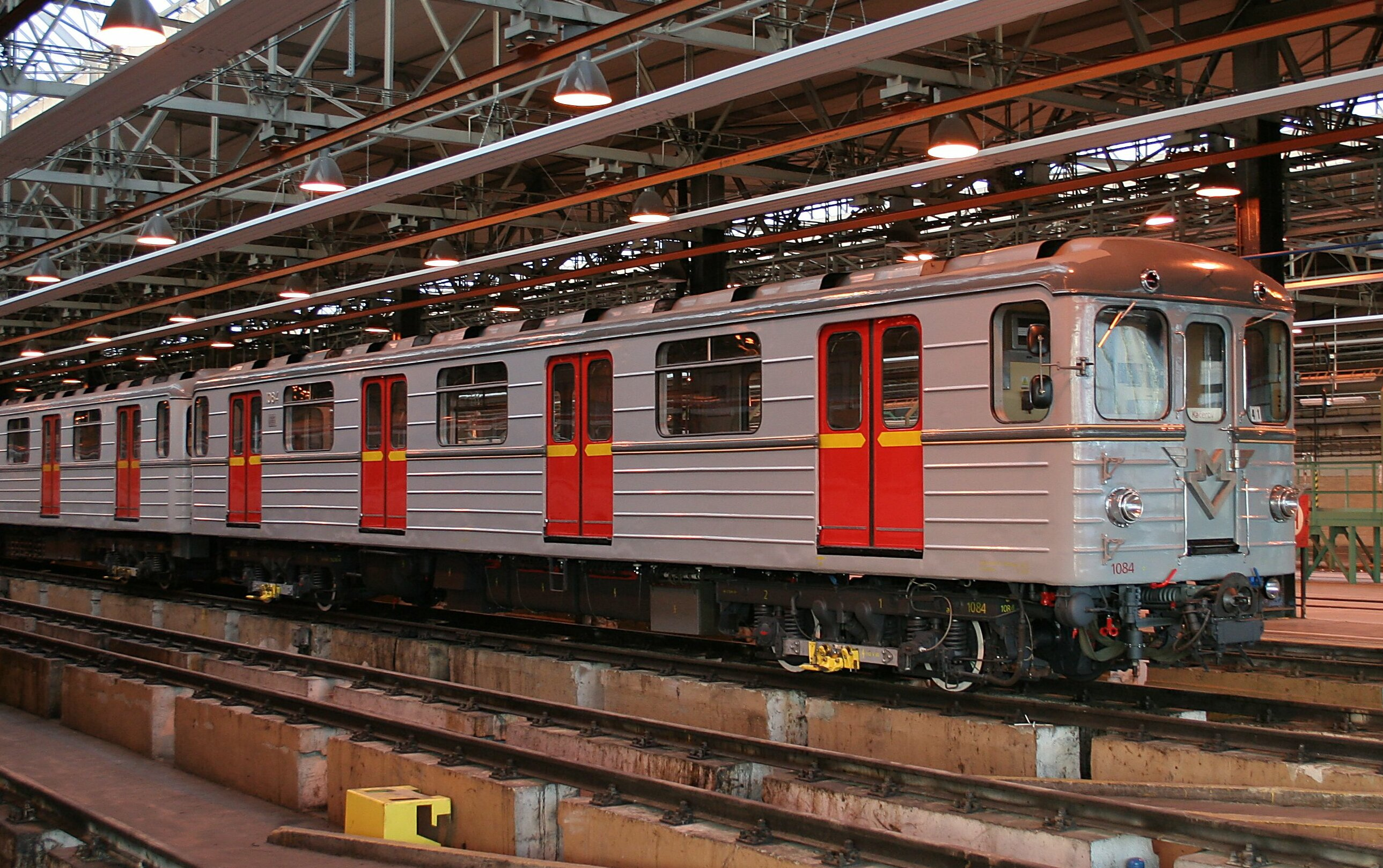

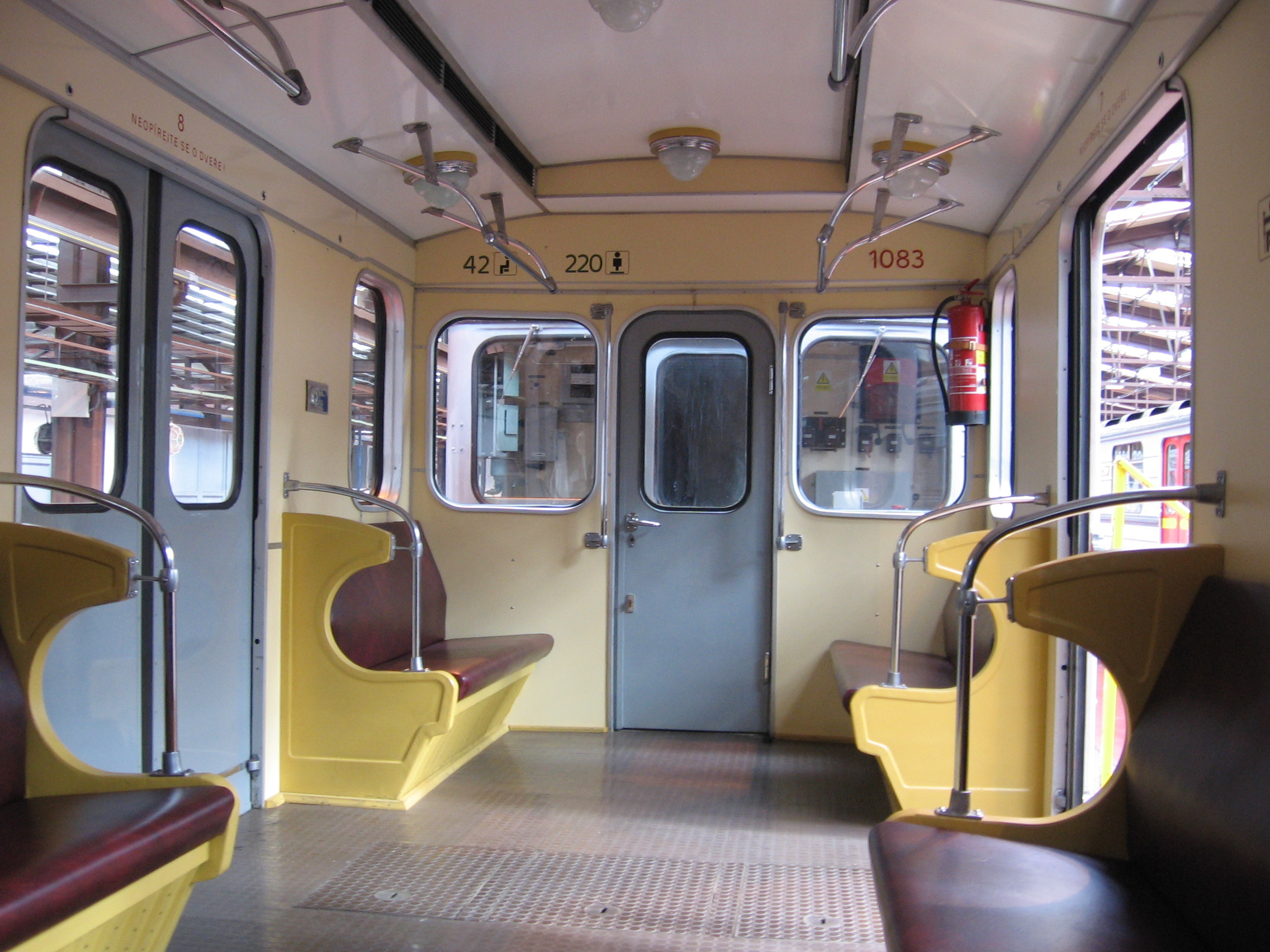
- In service: 1974–1997
- Manufacturer: Metrowagonmash
- Assembly: Mytishchi, Russia
- Constructed: 1972–1976
- Entered service: 1974
- Scrapped: 1994–1997
- Number built: 85
- Number preserved: 4
- Number scrapped: 79 (unknown fate of 1020 and 1031)
- Successor: 81-717/714
- Formation: 3–5 cars
- Fleet numbers: 1001–1085
- Capacity: 262
- Operators: DPP
- Depots: Kačerov (C)
- Lines served: Line C

Specifications
- Car length: 19,206 mm (63 ft 1/8 in)
- Width: 2,712 mm (8 ft 10 3/4 in)
- Height: 3,662 mm (12 ft 3/16 in)
- Floor height: 128 cm (50 in)
- Doors: 8 (4 by 2 sides) + 1 driver door on the left hand side
- Wheel diameter: 780 mm (31 in)
- Wheelbase: 2,100 mm (83 in) (bogie)
- Maximum speed: 90 km/h (56 mph)
- Weight: 32,500 kg (71,650 lb)
- Power output: 288 kW (386 hp)
- Acceleration: 1.2 m/s^{2} (3.9 ft/s^{2}; 4.3 km/(h⋅s))
- Electric system(s): 750 V DC third rail
- Current collector(s): contact shoe
- Braking system(s): Westinghouse brake (0–10km/h), dynamic brake (10–80km/h), additional emergency brake
- Safety system(s): ARS
- Coupling system: Scharfenberg coupler
- Track gauge: 1,435 mm (4 ft 8 1/2 in)

Notes/references
- 20 cars (1051–1070) were not fitted with the ARS safety system.

Ečs (81-709) is a type of Soviet metro rolling stock for Prague Metro that derives from the Metrowagonmash E series.

== History ==
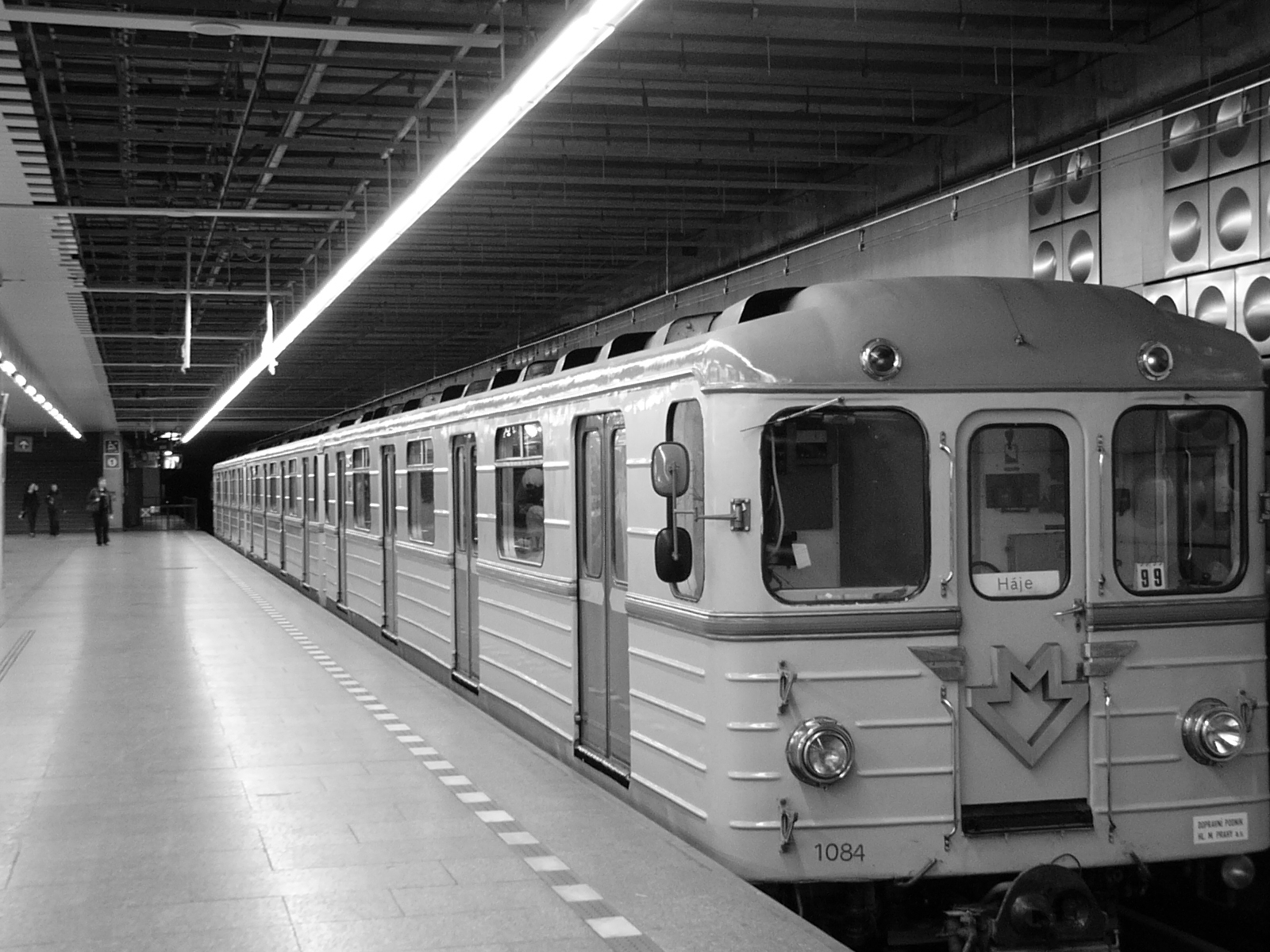
Ečs in Prague metro station Háje.

85 cars were built by Metrowagonmash in Mytishchi near Moscow between 1972 and 1976. The first six cars were delivered in 1973 for test runs, further 44 until 1974, when the trains entered service, firstly as three car sets. 20 cars followed in 1975 which had no tachographs, train radio, or ARS safety system and were used to extend the existing sets to the length of four cars. The last 15 cars were delivered in 1976.

In 1992, car 1031 was sold to Siemens to be used as an experimental vehicle for 1500 V DC voltage, 560 kW power output and current collection via overhead wires. In 1994, car 1020 was withdrawn and planned to be rebuilt by ČKD in cooperation with Škoda. The project wasn't realised.

The remaining cars were withdrawn between 1994 and 1997.

Four of the 85 cars have been preserved, of which three (1083, 1084, 1085) are kept in Kačerov (C) depot for special occasions, and one (1009) is preserved in the Prague Public Transport Museum in Střešovice.
