= 81-717/714 =

Soviet subway car

Metrovagonmash 81-717/81-714
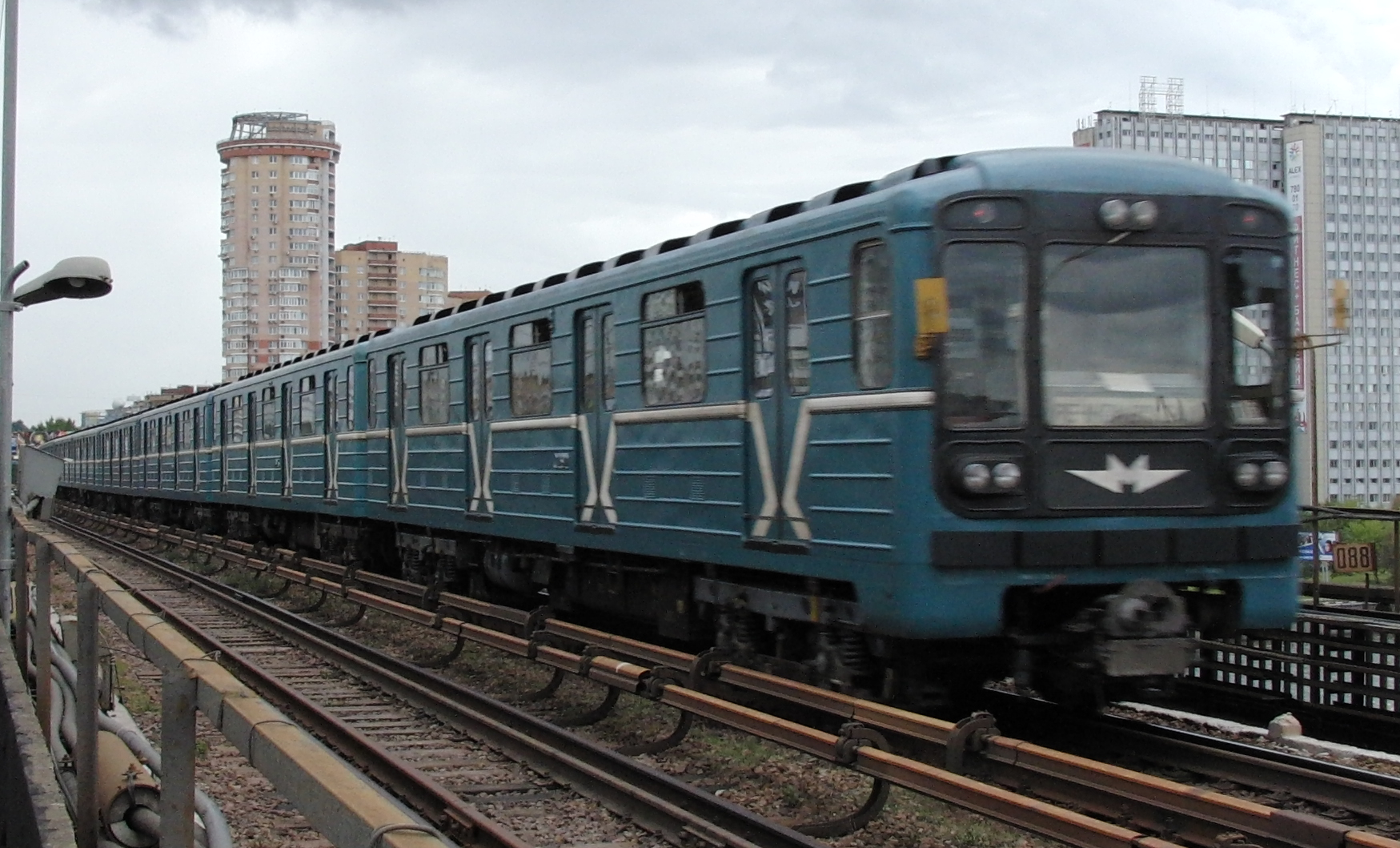
- An 81-717.5/81-714.5 trainset on the Nagatinsky Metro Bridge in Moscow, 26 August 2010.
- In service: 1977–present (former USSR); 1978-2009 (Czech Republic, non-modernized); 2000-present (Czech Republic, modernized); 1979-2018 (Hungary, non-modernized); 2016-present (Hungary, modernized); 1995-present (Poland, non-modernized); 1998-present (Bulgaria, non-modernized); 2020-present (Bulgaria, modernized); 2007-present (Russia, 81-717.6K/81-714.6K); 2009-present (Russia, 81-717.6/81-714.6)
- Manufacturers: Metrovagonmash Mytishchi; Vagonmash Sankt Petersburg (formerly Leningrad Railcar Factory named after I. E. Yegorov); Tver (formerly Kalinin); Railcar Factory; October Electric Railcar; Repair Factory
- Family name: 81-717 series
- Replaced: Ež3/Em508T series
- Constructed: 1976 (prototype); 1977-1988 (base model); 1977-2021 (with modifications, this period could be prolonged)
- Entered service: 1978 (Moscow and Prague); 1979 (Budapest); 1980 (Saint Petersburg, Kyiv and Tashkent); 1981 (Yerevan); 1983 (Kharkiv); 1984 (Minsk); 1985 (Nizhny Novgorod); 1986 (Novosibirsk); 1987 (Baku, Samara and Tbilisi); 1991 (Yekaterinburg); 1995 (Warsaw and Dnipro); 1998 (Sofia)
- Refurbished: 81-717/81-714; 81-717M/81-714M; 81-717.2K/81-714.2K; 81-717.4K/81-714.4K; 81-717.5/81-714.5; 81-717.5M/81-714.5M; 81-717.6K/81-714.6K; 81-71M
- Scrapped: since 2012
- Number built: 1,042 trainsets (equivalent to 7,409 cars)
- Predecessor: E series (Ezh, Em, Ezh3)
- Successor: 81-720 series
- Capacity: 330 passengers per wagon
- Operator
- Lines served: Baku Metro, Azerbaijan; Budapest Metro, Hungary: Line M3; Dnipro Metro, Ukraine, Kharkiv Metro, Ukraine; Kyiv Metro, Ukraine; Minsk Metro, Belarus; Moscow Metro, Russia: Lines; Nizhny Novgorod Metro, Russia; Novosibirsk Metro, Russia; Prague Metro, Czech Republic; Saint Petersburg Metro, Russia: Lines; Samara Metro, Russia; Sofia Metro, Bulgaria: Lines; Tashkent Metro, Uzbekistan, Tbilisi Metro, Georgia; Warsaw Metro, Poland: Lines; Yekaterinburg Metro, Russia; Yerevan Metro, Armenia

Specifications
- Car length: 19,206 mm (63 ft 1/8 in)
- Width: 2,670 mm (8 ft 9 1/8 in)
- Height: 3,650 mm (11 ft 11 3/4 in)
- Doors: Head car (81-717): 4 by 2 sides + 1 on the aft end of the car and 1 for the driver Intermediate car (81-714): 4 by 2 sides + 2 on both ends of the car
- Maximum speed: 90 km/h (56 mph) (max achievable speed); 80 km/h (50 mph) (max serviceable speed)
- Weight: 34 t (33.5 long tons; 37.5 short tons)
- Power output: 456 kW (612 hp)
- Acceleration: 1.2 m/s^{2} (3.9 ft/s^{2}; 4.3 km/(h⋅s))
- Deceleration: 1.1 m/s^{2} (3.6 ft/s^{2}; 4.0 km/(h⋅s))
- Electric systems: 750 V DC third rail
- Current collection: Contact shoe
- Coupling system: Scharfenberg coupler
- Track gauge: 1,520 mm (4 ft 11 27/32 in) Russian gauge 1,435 mm (4 ft 8 1/2 in) standard gauge

The Metrovagonmash 81-717/81-714 Nomernoy is a Soviet/Russian electric multiple unit for rapid transit applications, designed in the Soviet Union in the mid-1970s. The cars were made from 1976 to 2021 by Metrovagonmash and the I. E. Yegorov Vagonmash factories of Mytishchi and Saint Petersburg, respectively, though production is still ongoing for specific modifications. The 81-series trains are the most widespread metro train ever, being produced in 24 different variations currently being used in 19 rapid transit systems across 11 countries, as well as being the metro train with the longest production span and largest total production number, with over 7000 cars having been manufactured in total so far.

The names 81-717 and 81-714, also known as Nomernoy in some countries, and as Vagonmash in other ones, come from the Soviet electric rail vehicle numbering system, where the 81-717 cars are the control cars and the 81-714 are the trailer cars. Unlike the previous metro trains made in the Soviet Union, they never received a lettered classification, thus, they have been known as the 81-series or the Numbered Trains (Номерной Поезд). The numbered trains, as they are known colloquially among railfans and some commuters, feature restyled front ends, stronger electric traction motors, complex and wider usage of various electronic devices, and are more advanced than their predecessor, the E-series.

They were first deployed in Moscow in 1978, and have since then seen widespread usage in the former USSR and its satellite states in Prague, Budapest, Warsaw, and Sofia.

== History ==
=== Background ===
By the 1970s, most metro lines in the Soviet Union were using the E-series trainsets, which started mass production in 1963 (although the prototype was built in 1959). They were a further development of the G and D-series rolling stock from the late 1940s and 1950s, but with upgraded electric equipment (contactor-based, built by the Dinamo Electric Machines Factory of Moscow). Although there was improvement in the construction of the carbodies (based on the Riga-built ER1 EMUs of the Soviet Railways), the traction motors were quite weak, and the contactor system had limits. This, in relation to the weight of the cars and the oversimplified electric system, which was built in order to emphasize on energy conservation, led to a poor acceleration performance, which reduced the headway on metro lines on various networks at the time. To counter this, engineers came up with three key different solutions:

- Increase the power of the traction motors;
- Apply pulse voltage regulation, with excitation of traction motors;
- Reduce the weight of the carbodies;

The pulse voltage regulation system was already attempted. The Ečs subseries of the E-series, which was delivered to Prague from 1972 to 1976, was very different from the Ev subseries delivered to Budapest from 1969 to 1979: it featured thyristor pulse converters to regulate the excitation of traction motors during acceleration and deceleration, increasing their performance, whilst retaining the same carbody. Another upgrade was the Ež3/Em508T subseries, delivered to multiple Soviet cities from 1973 to 1979. Using experiences learnt from the Ei subseries (delivered from 1968 to 1973), it applied pulse voltage regulation on traction motors too, and eliminated the ripple-effects within the ALS-ARS safety systems, greatly improving the general performance of these sets and at the same time, keeping electric consumption to the strictly necessary. In regards to weight reduction, it was still decided to reduce some weight, so the car bodies would be built from aluminium. A more powerful traction engine was developed, too.

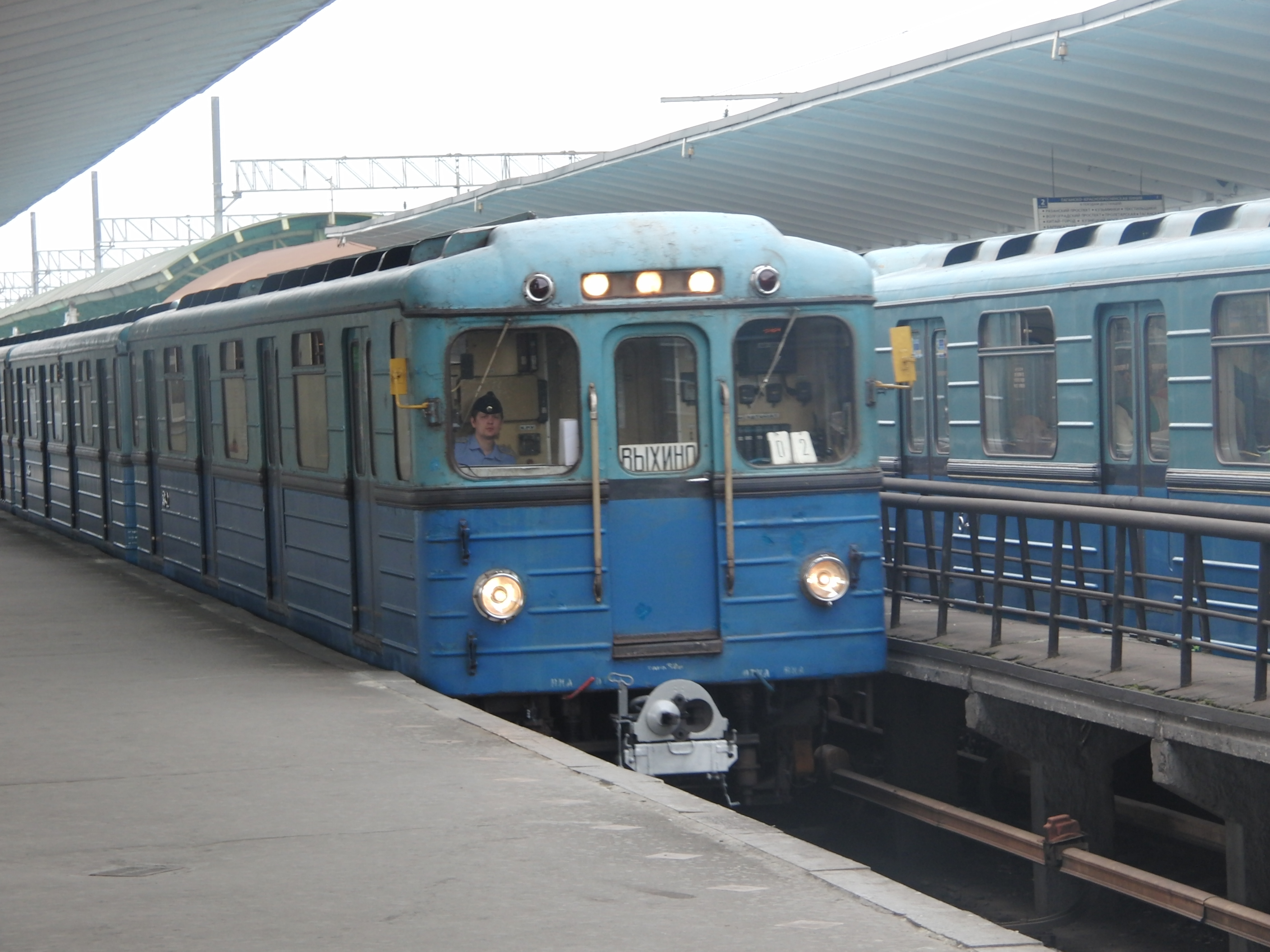
An Ež3/Em508T trainset at Vykhino Station in Moscow. Gaining knowledge from experimenting with the E-series led to the eventual development of the I-series, and later on, to the 81-series as well.

Thus, in 1973, at the Mytishchi Machine-Building Plant, a team of engineers under the leadership of the plant's chief designer A. G. Akimov, designed three different prototypes of the new trains, which later became known as the I-series (in the numbered classification, 81-715 was the control car, and 81-716 was the trailer car). The first prototype of the I-series was manufactured in 1974, and it was a drastic change from the other Moscow Metro sets that were using the network at the time despite being : compared to the original E-series, which produced 72 kWh, the new sets produced 90 (later 100) kWh. The aluminium alloy carbodies reduced the tare mass of the cars by 2 tonnes, and featured thyristorized voltage regulation and excitation, which greatly increased the speed and acceleration of the trains, allowing them to reach a top speed of 100 km/h (62 mph). In addition to this, the new train implemented forced ventilation (removing the humps of the roof that were for ventilation of the passenger area), new lighting in the passenger area, and removal of cabs on the trailer cars, leaving only 1 cab at the each end of the train.

This greatly increased the passenger capacity and performance. But despite its advantages, it posed disadvantages to its manufacturers: it was too complex to be mass-produced, in such a short time. The factories that were to produce the cars could not set up aluminium manufacturing facilities in such a short time, and additionally, the voltage regulation system and thyristors required refinement. The type 1 prototype of the I-series was eventually made, but the production of the Ež3/Em508T subseries continued, also due to lower costs of manufacture.

=== The base model ===
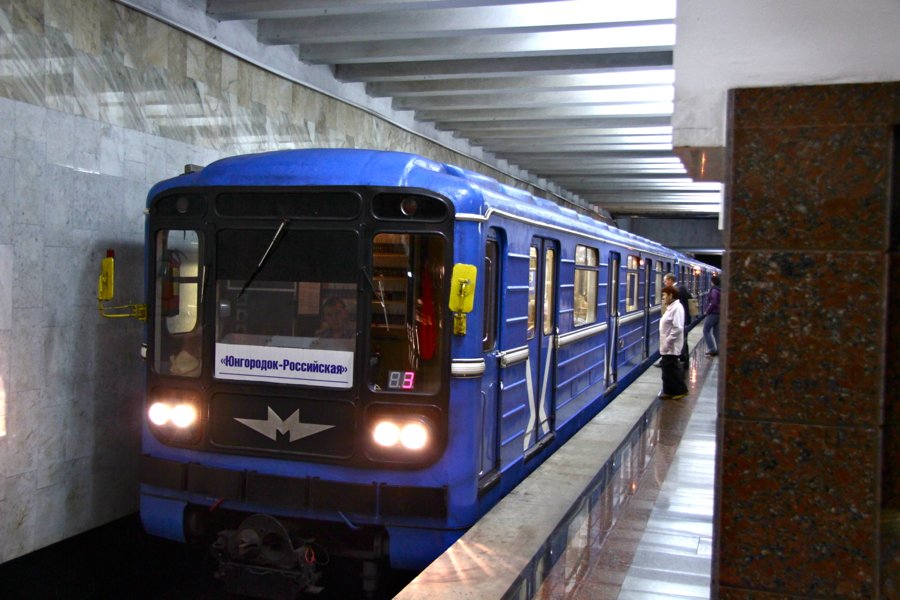
A 1987-built base model 81-717/714 trainset in Samara.

By the early 1970s, the Metrovagonmash factory already designed a trailer car type, based on the never-built Ež2 subseries. The control cars were also based on the Ež2, but the front end was modified, along with the drivers controls. These two types of cars later became 81-714 and 81-717, respectively. With more lessons learnt from the electrical propulsion system of the I-series, in the first half of 1976, the Mytishchi factory produced the first six cars of the 81-series. These carriages were 5846, 5854, 5855 (control cars) and 5837, 5867, 5868 (trailer cars).

The design of the new cars was both similar and different from the newest E-series cars. The carbodies were roughly similar to them, having same dimensions. Certain equipment (doors, motor-compressors, batteries and other pneumatic equipment) were also carried over from the Ež3 subseries. However the most noticeable external change was in the front ends of the train: the driver car was placed in the middle of the front end of the head car as opposed to its right front end side as before. Additionally, the emergency exit doors were removed, because of this. Traction motors from the I-series, the DK-117B, now producing 110 kWh, were installed. Compared to the older trains, an Auxiliary Power Supply Unit (Блок Питания Собственных Нужд) was installed to power the batteries. Lighting in the passenger area was now made with fluorescent lamps. This led to an increase in the tare weight of the cars, so it was decided to use a springs-based suspension.

The 81-series cars never got a lettered classification, because these were an experimental alternative to the complex I-series cars. But the complexity of the I-series cars, which meant endless adjustments regarding aluminium production, pulse regulation, at the time when newly opened Soviet metro networks (such as in Tashkent, Kharkiv, etc.) were in dire need of new cars, led to the selection of the 81-series to become the new standard metro trainset of the Soviet Union. The production of prototypes of the I-series continued in the 1980s, but they were the last to receive a lettered classification, which meant that metro sets produced from the 81-717/714 onwards never received a lettered classification. With the appearance of newer sets (such as the Yauza, Rusich, Oka, Neva, Moskva), the 81-series then became known as the "Numbered Train" (Номерной Поезд; Nomernoy Poezd). It should also be noted that "nomernoy" also stands for vehicle registration plates, so this can be a widely interpreted name in the English language.

The demand for the cars was very high at the beginning, so high, that production at the I. E. Yegorov factory in Leningrad (now known as Vagonmash Saint Petersburg) began in January 1980 and in the Tver (then known as Kalinin) Railcar Factory later on as well.

The base model of 81-717/714 rolling stock was produced between 1977 and 1988.

== Operation ==
Since its start of production, the 81-series has been delivered to all metro networks of the former Soviet Union, and also to most of the Warsaw Pact countries.

=== Within the USSR ===
In the former USSR, all trains use the 1,520 mm (4 ft 11 27/32 in) Russian gauge.

==== Moscow ====
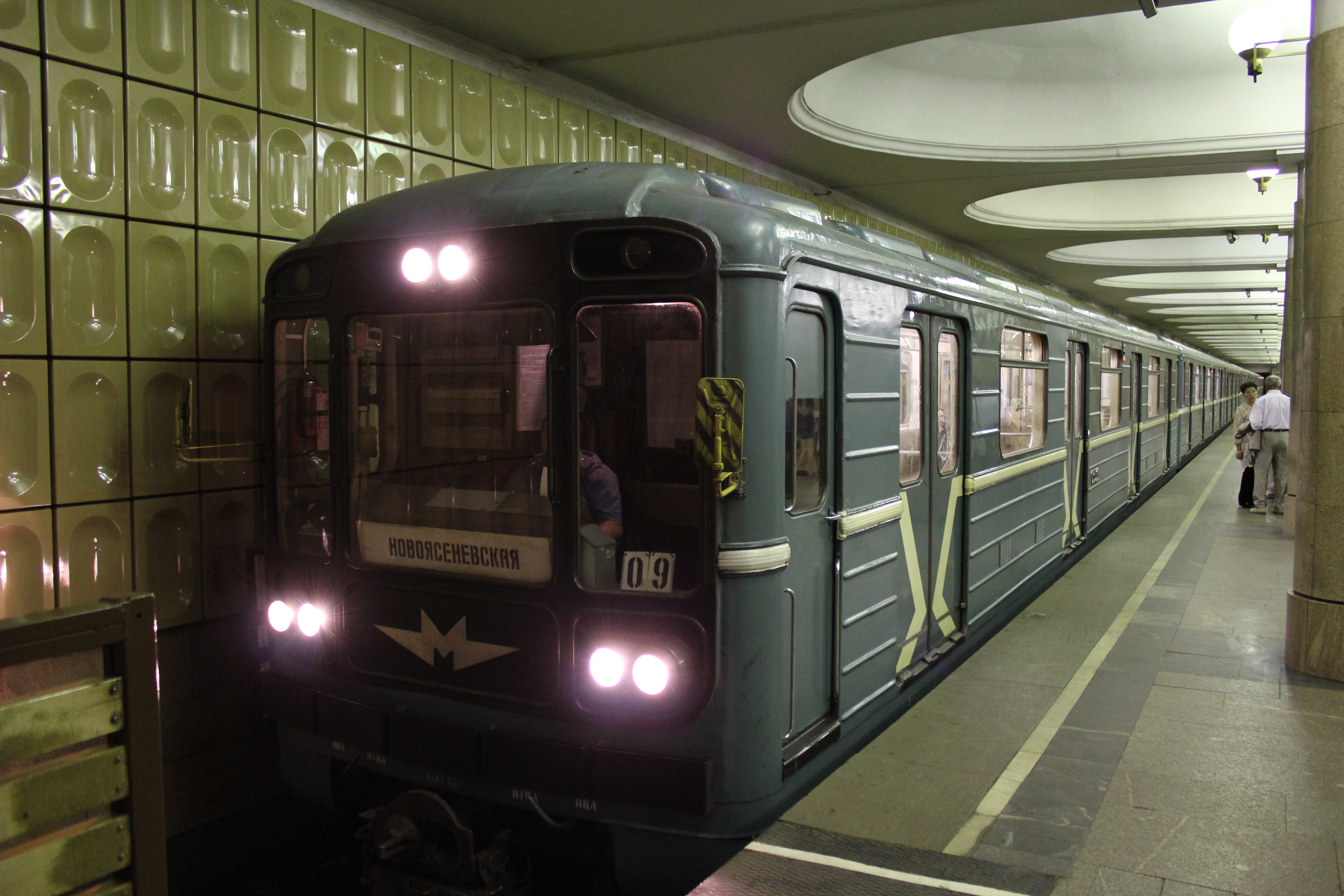
An 81-717.5/714.5 trainset in Moscow.

Moscow was the first customer of 81-717/714 trains in the Soviet Union, where it initially tested the prototypes in 1976-77. By late 1977, the capital city had placed its order for the new train model, and the first trains arrived in 1978 on the Koltsevaya line, replacing the G-series rolling stock that had been operating on the line ever since its opening in 1950. This was followed with the newly opened Kalininskaya Line and the Zamoskvoretskaya Line in 1979. Since then they have become representative of the network, being used on almost all lines (except the ones that kept using E-series rolling stock and those that were replaced with Rusich, Oka and Moskva trains).

Production of the base model 81-717/714 trains for Moscow ended in 1988, when the manufacturing of the 81-717.5/714.5 trainsets for the city's metro system began (this modification was a big step forward as the new cars had fireproof electrical equipment, a fire alarm, and fire extinguishing system, as well as a microphone in the driver's cabin; the 81-series trains for Warsaw and Sofia were based on the 81-717.5/714.5 type). Production of the 81-717.5/714.5 trains for Moscow ended in 1993, as the capital began purchasing 81-717.5M/714.5M trainsets the same year. The last delivery of 81-717.5M/714.5M trains for Moscow was carried out in 2010.

Over the years, the 81-717/714 sets received improvements, especially from the late 1990s onwards, replacing the traditional leather bench-type seats with vandal-proof plastic ones. Externally, the difference between the base model and newer sets is the presence of four headlights in the centre instead of two headlights above the drivers' cab. More recently, refurbished sets feature the new Moscow Metro livery, with blue corrugated sides and grey window bands.

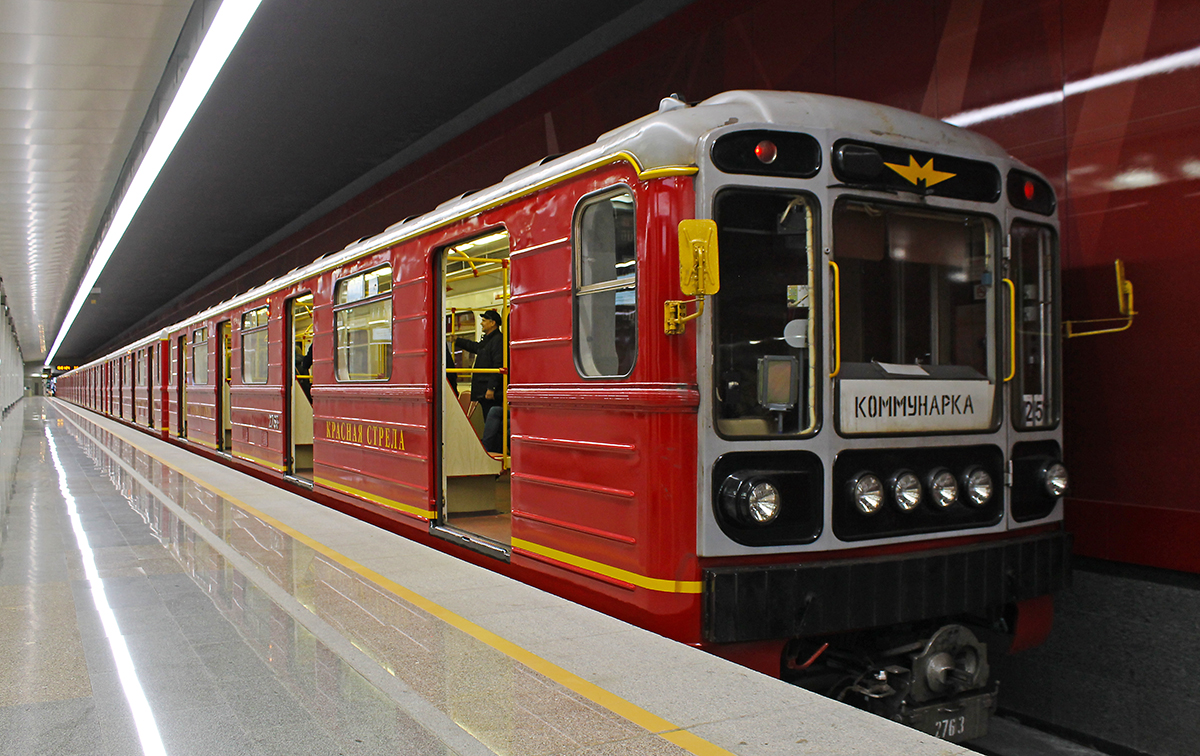
Red Arrow commemorative trainset at Kommunarka Station of the Moscow, 29 June 2019. The 81-717.5M/714.5M's main visual difference from the original sets is the different front headlight configuration. This particular trainset was involved in the 2010 Moscow Metro bombings.

Some of the 81-717/714 sets have special liveries, most notably the Red Arrow trainset, which is painted in a red/gold livery instead of the traditional blue/white scheme. Another example is the 81-717.5A/714.5A Sokolniki retro train, used exclusively on the Sokolnicheskaya Line since 2010. It was based on the A-series rolling stock of the Moscow Metro, following a particular theme: the exterior is similar to the A-series trains in a cream/chocolate livery, whilst the interior is based on the one of 1950s Soviet metro cars.

Their current allocation is:

- TMD-1 Severnoye (Sokolnicheskaya line)
- TMD-2 Sokol (Zamoskvoretskaya line)
- TMD-15 Pechatniki (Lyublinsko-Dimitrovskaya line)
- TMD-17 Brateyevo (Zamoskvoretskaya line)
- TMD-19 Likhobory (Lyublinsko-Dimitrovskaya line)

It is expected that at some point, all 81-717/714 rolling stock will be withdrawn due to the incoming Moskva trains, which have been introduced gradually since 2017 on multiple lines where the 81-717/714s are operating. It is scheduled that all 81-717/714 cars in Moscow will cease operation by 2040.

==== Kyiv ====
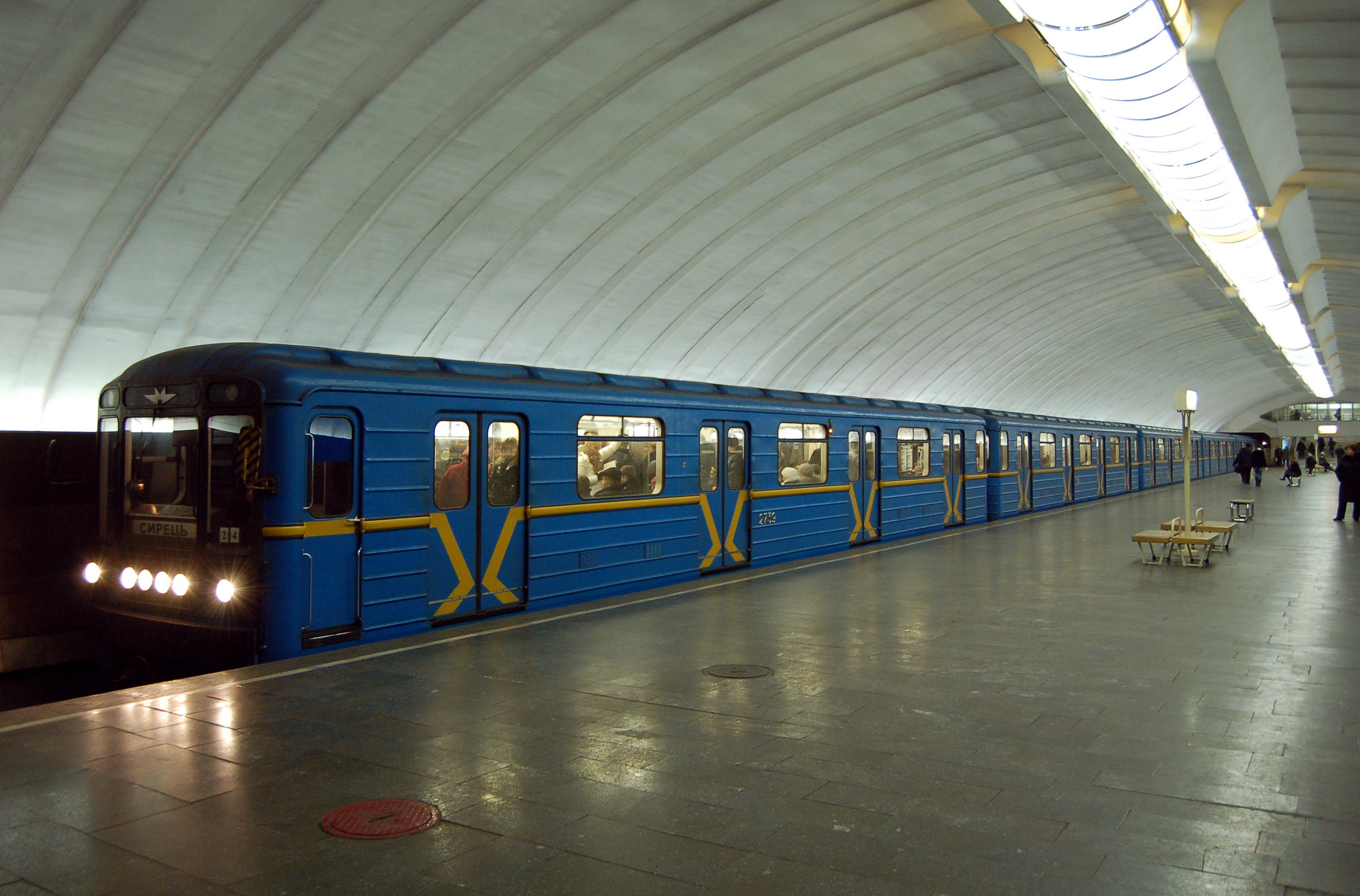
An 81-717.5M/714.5M trainset in Kyiv.

81-717/714 trains were delivered to Kyiv in 1980 in order to modernize the metropolitan's rolling stock, followed by 81-717.5/714.5 trainsets in 1989, 81-717.5M/714.5M trains in 1995, and 81-717.5K/714.5K trains in 2013, while in 2023, 60 81-717.3/714.3 carriages were donated to Kyiv from Warsaw. All the 81-717/714 trainsets from the 1980s underwent a major overhaul in 2019-20.

==== Saint Petersburg (formerly Leningrad) ====
81-717/714 trains and many of their modified variants are in service on Line 2 (Moskovsko-Petrogradskaya Line), Line 4 (Pravoberezhnaya Line) and Line 5 (Frunzensko-Primorskaya Line) of the Saint Petersburg Metro since the 1980s, though the oldest 81-717/714 trains for the metro system were manufactured in 1977.

==== Tashkent ====
Trains of types 81-717/714 and 81-717.5/714.5 were delivered to Tashkent from 1980 to 1993 in order to replace the Ezh3/Em-508T cars on the Chilonzor Line and enter service on the Uzbekistan Line. Currently, there are 168 81-series cars in operation in the metro system, most of which have been modernized.

==== Yerevan ====
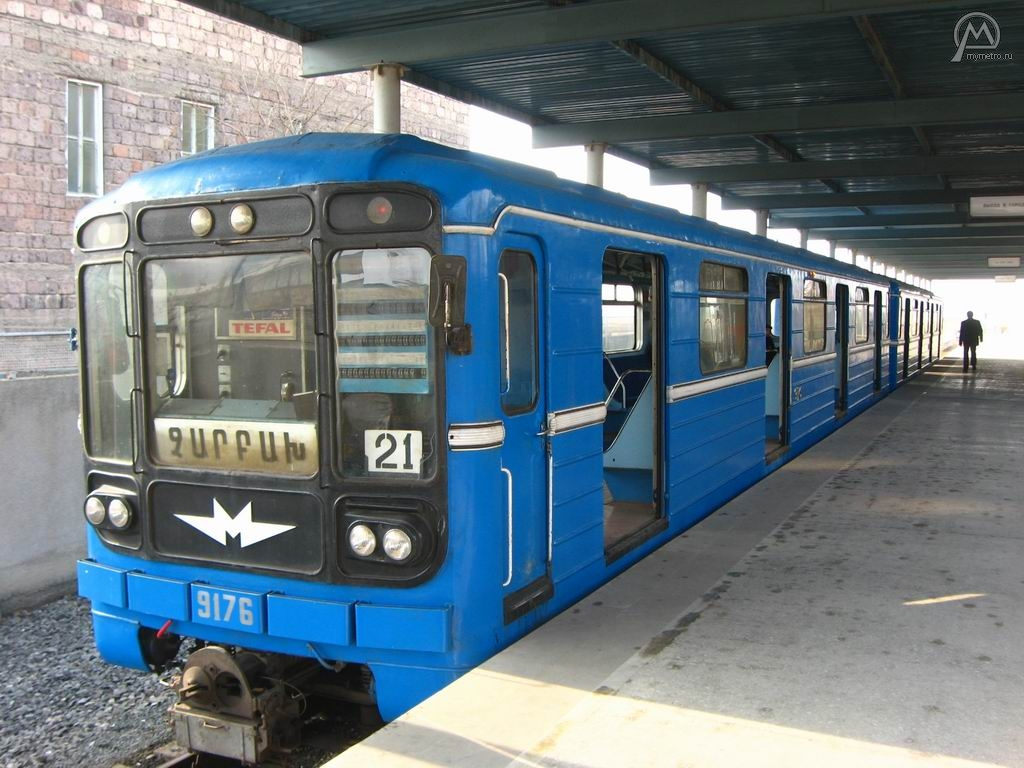
An 81-717.5/714.5 trainset in Yerevan.

Trains of type 81-717/714 have been in service in Yerevan ever since the opening of the metro system in 1981. Two four-car 81-717.5/714.5 trainsets were delivered in 1993. In the early 1990s many 81-717/714 trains were sold to the Moscow Metro. Since 2001, all 81-717/714 trainsets in Yerevan consist of two cars. In the early 2000s some of the older 81-717/714 trainsets underwent a minor refit, while complete modernization of all the 81-717/714 trains and the 81-717.5/714.5 trains is being carried out since 2016. The refurbished trains are running as 81-717M/714M trainsets and 81-717.5M/714.5M trainsets.

==== Kharkiv ====
81-717/714 and 81-717.5/714.5 trains are used in Kharkiv. 112 81-717/714 cars were delivered to the city's metro system in 1983 in order to increase the number of the rolling stock of the metropolitan, followed by twenty-eight 81-717.5/714.5 cars in the 1990s. Plastic seats are being installed on the rolling stock of the metro for the past ten years.

==== Minsk ====
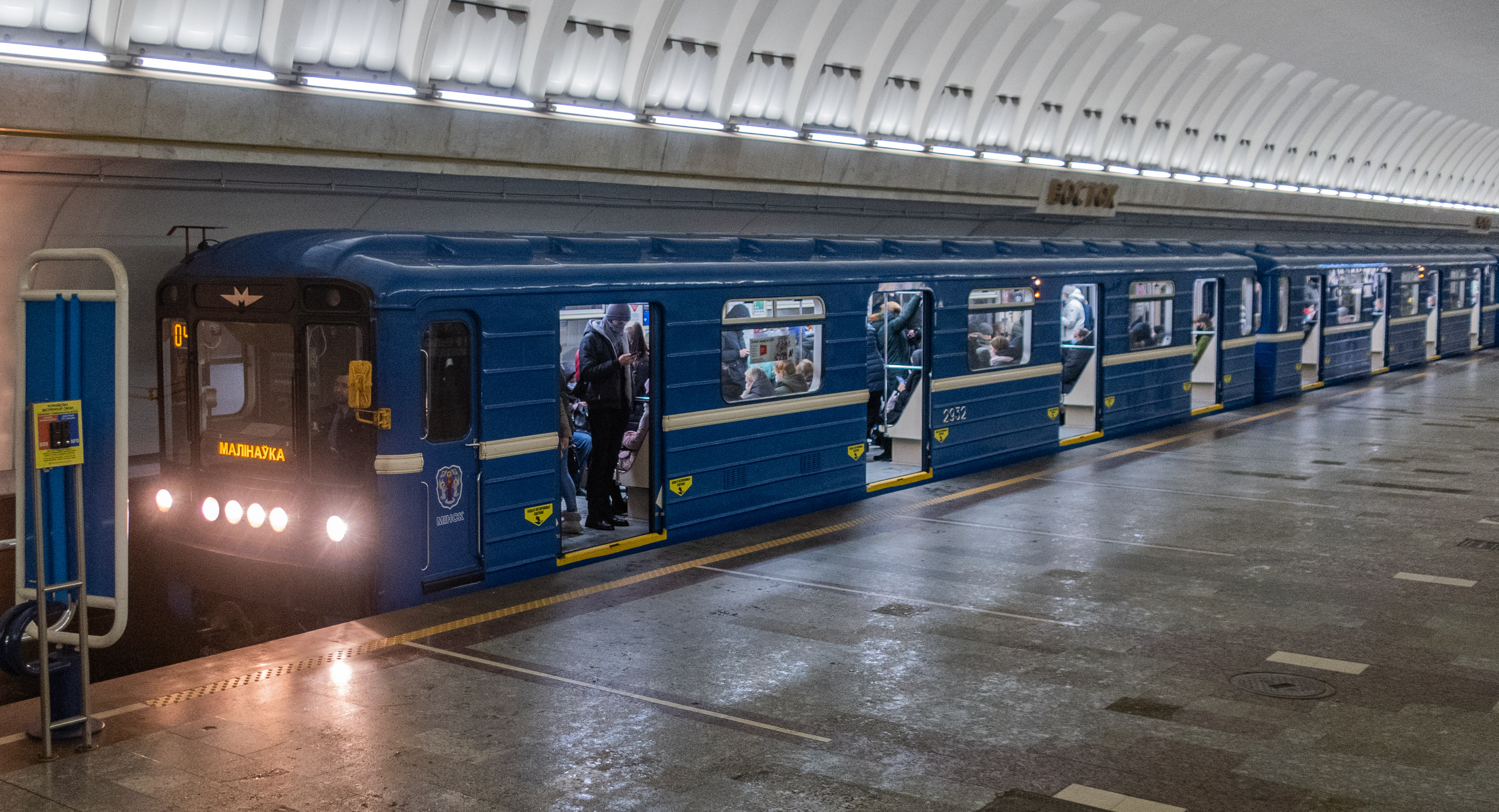
An 81-717.5M/714.5M trainset in Minsk.

81-717/717 trainsets are in service in the Minsk Metro ever since the opening of the metro system's first line in 1984. All of them have been modernized. In the late 1980s 81-717.5/714.5 trains were delivered to the city, followed by 81-717.5M/714.5M trainsets between 1993 and 2014.

==== Nizhny Novgorod ====
58 81-717/714 carriages were given to Nizhny Novgorod from Leningrad in 1985 (these trains ran alongside D-type trainsets until 1993). These cars were enough to form 12 four-car trainsets, with some cars being in reserve. They were followed by 4 more such carriages in 1987, eighteen 81-717.5/714.5 cars in total in 1991 and 1993, and 50 81-717.6/71.6 cars between 2012 and 2017. In 2024, the modernization of all the trainsets produced prior to 2000 was completed. Currently, the 81-717/714 trains
and their modified versions serve on both lines 1 and 2 of the Nizhniy Novgorod Metro.

==== Novosibirsk ====
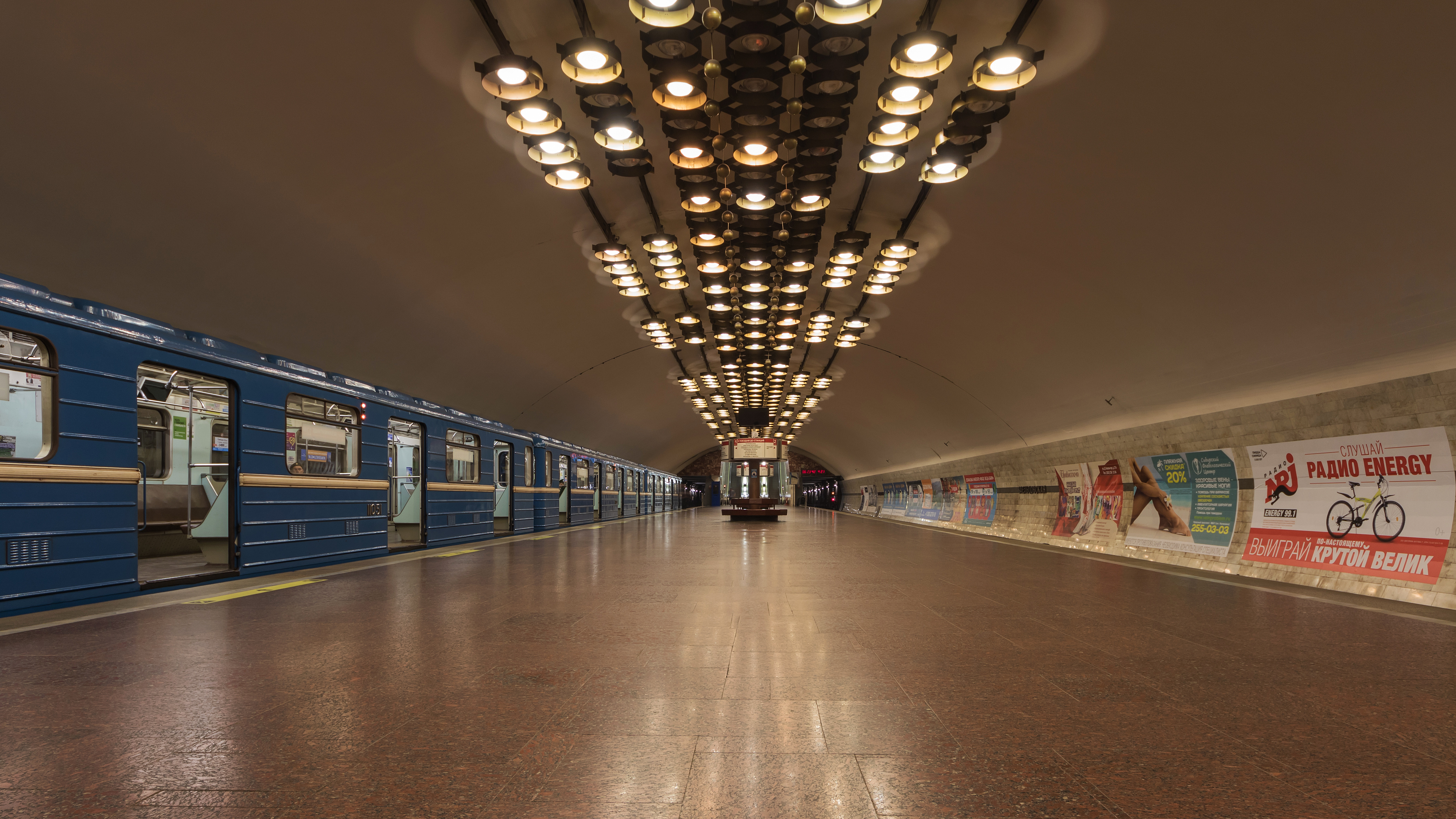
An 81-717.5/714.5 trainset in Novosibirsk.

13 four-car 81-717/714 trainsets were produced for the Novosibirsk Metro in 1985, and are in service since 1986 when the metro was opened. They were followed by 2 four-car 81-717/714 train in 1987, five four-car 81-717.5/714.5 trains in 1989-1992, two four-car 81-717.5M/714.5M trains in 2006 and 2007, and 1 four-car 81-717.5N/714.5N trains in 2010. 3 other 81-series trains are in service as well, 2 of which have 81-717.5N head cars, though their intermediate cars are of type 81-541.2N, while the third one consists of two 81-540.2H head cars and two 81-541.2H intermediate cars.

==== Baku ====
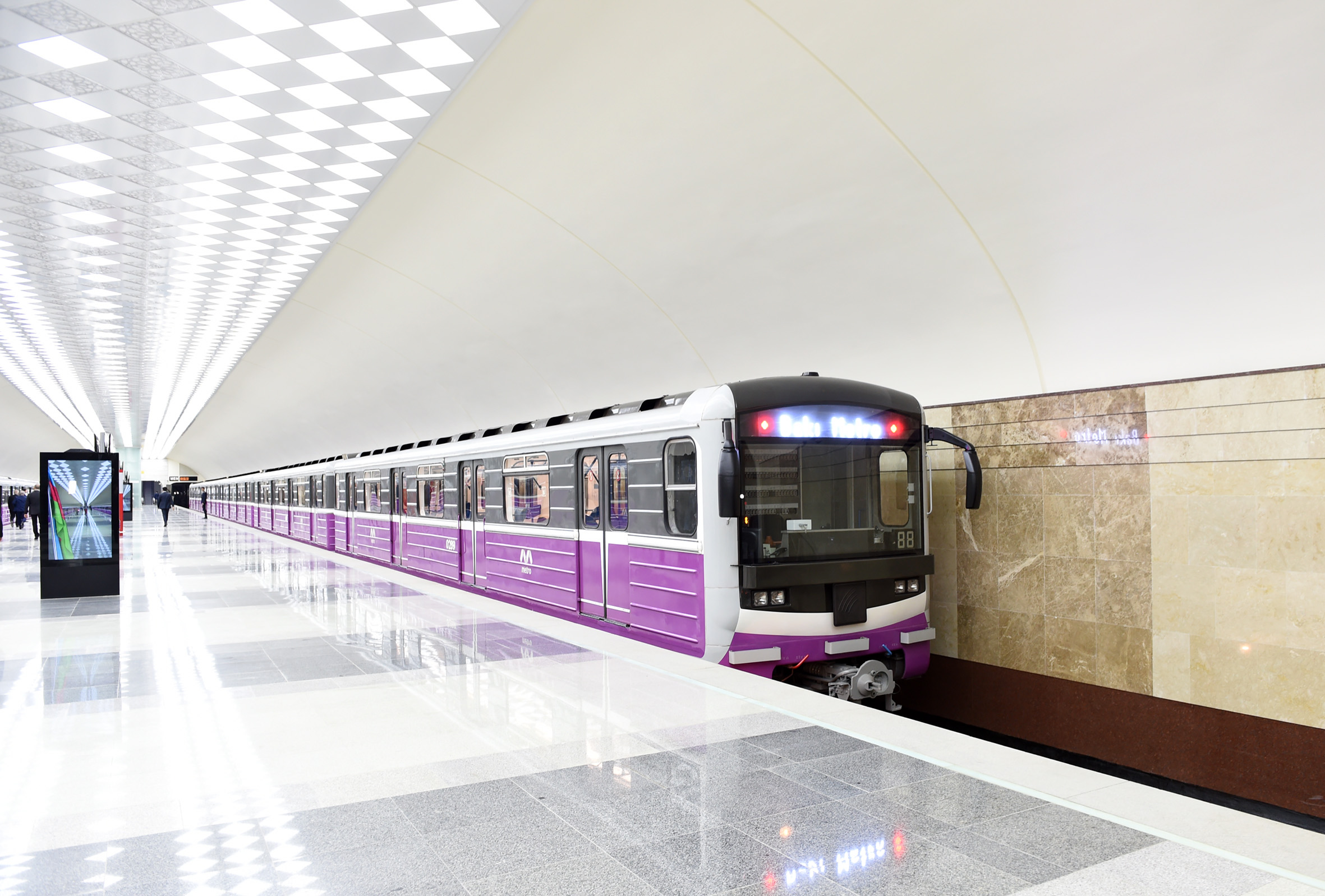
An 81-717M/714M trainset in Baku.

81-717/714 trainsets were delivered to the Baku Metro in 1987 in order to fully replace all the modifications of the E-series in the following years. The current rolling stock of 81-717/714 trains in the metro system is: 81-717M/714M trainsets (all of which were 81-717/714 trains prior to their modernization in 2016-2022), 81-717.5/714.5 trainsets (all of which are refurbished), 81-717.5M/714.5M trains (most of which are refurbished), and 81-717.5B/714.5B trains.

==== Samara ====
81-717/714 trains for the Samara Metro were manufactured in 1987 prior to the opening of the metropolitan the same year, followed by 81-717.5/714.5 and 81-717.6/714.6 trainsets in the 1990s and in the 2020s respectively. All trains consists of four cars (two head ones and two intermediate ones) and run on all three lines of the metro system. The 1987-built units are being systematically modernized since 2020.

==== Tbilisi ====
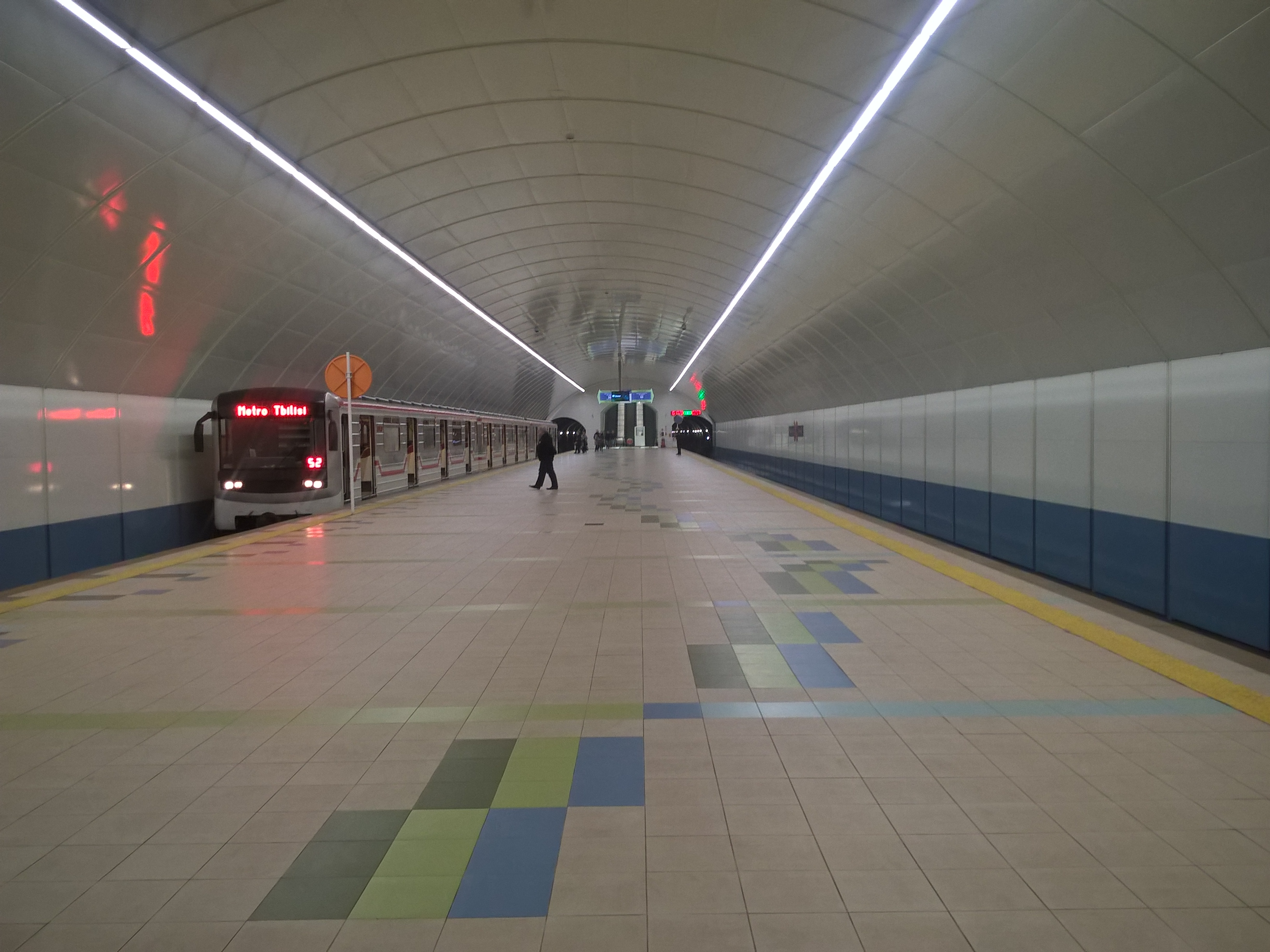
An 81-717M/714M trainset in Tbilisi.

81-717/714 trains are in service on both the Akhmeteli-Varketili Line (on this line there are some Ež3 and Em-508T modernized cars as well), and the Saburtalo Line of the Tbilisi Metro since 1987. All trains have been refurbished and are now running as 81-717M/714M rolling stock. The 81-717/714 trains were modified into 81-717M/714Ms using Czech blueprints, hence the similar cab and livery designs, and thus should not be confused with their Czech counterparts.

==== Yekaterinburg ====
46 trains of type 81-717.5/714.5 were delivered to Yekaterinburg when the first and still only line of the city's metro system was opened in 1991. They were followed by eight 81-717.5M/71.5M trainsets in 2011, and by eight 81-717.6/714.6 cars in 2019. Currently, there are 62 four-car trains in the Yekaterinburg Metro, all from the 81-series. Some of the 81-717.5/714.5 trains were modernized in 2019.

==== Dnipro ====
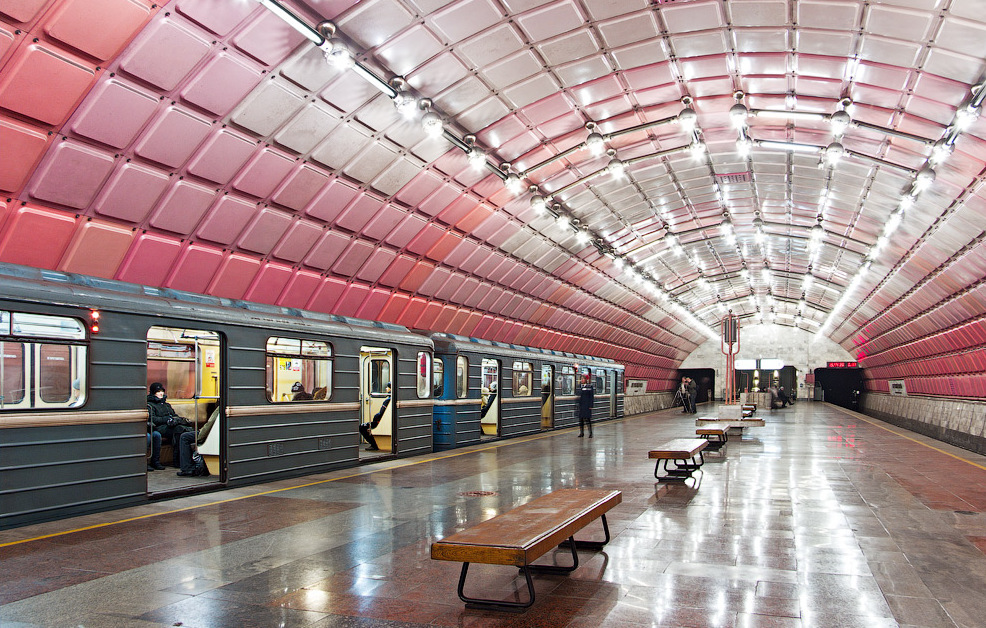
An 81-717.5/714.5 trainset in Dnipro.

45 cars (18 head ones and 27 intermediate ones) of types 81-717.5/714.5 and 81-717.5M/714.5M, are operated in the Dnipro Metro, serving on the metropolitan's only line since 1995.

=== Outside the USSR ===
Outside the USSR, 81-717/714 modified trainsets were delivered initially to Prague and Budapest, and later on to Warsaw and Sofia. Like mainline trains in their respective countries, they are all 1,435 mm (4 ft 8 1/2 in) standard gauge.

==== Prague ====
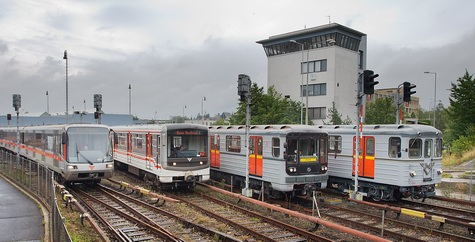
Rolling stock of the Prague Metro, right-to-left: An original Ečs (81-709) trainset, a non-refurbished 81-717.1/714.1 trainset, a modernized 81-71M trainset, and a Siemens M1 trainset.

507 carriages (204 head cars and 303 intermediate cars) of type 81-717.1/714.1 were delivered to Prague between 1978 and 1990, forming 101 five-car sets with two intermediate cars kept as spares, adding onto the Ečs trains that had been delivered earlier. Three cars were lost: one was scrapped after a derailment at Leninova (now Dejvická) station in 1986, while two were lost in a fire at Kosmonautů (now Háje) station in 1987. Full overhauls had been scheduled for the oldest cars in the early 1990s, but it was eventually decided that a more complete rebuild was required, and between 1994 and 2010 most but not all of the 81-717.1/714.1 cars were rebuilt as 81-71M stock by Škoda and ČKD. Since 2005 series 81 trains on line C were replaced by new trains produced jointly by ČKD, Adtrans and Siemens, 41 modernized 81-71M remain in service on Line A and 52 on Line B.

==== Budapest ====
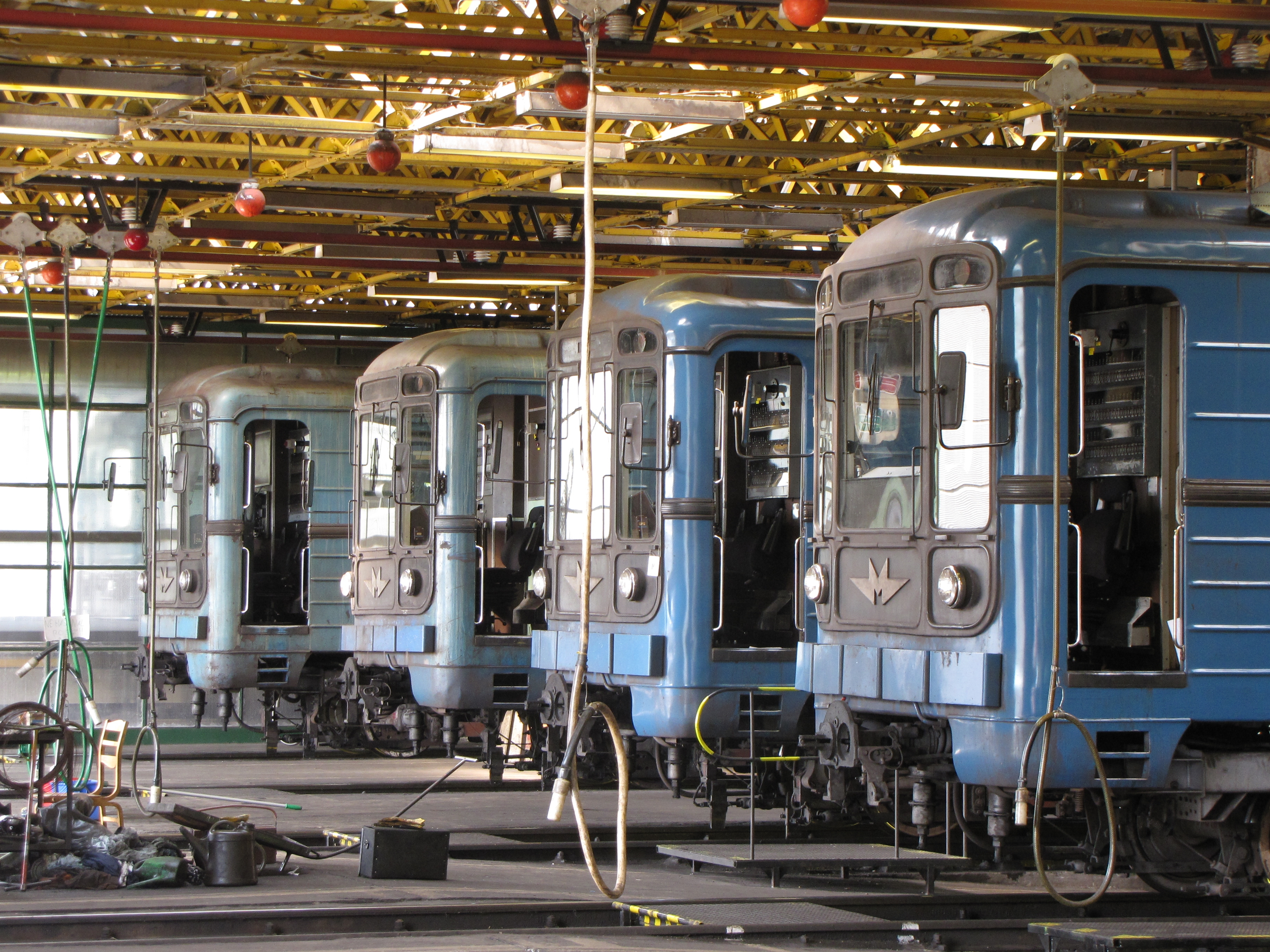
81-717.2/714.2 trainsets in Budapest.

32 trains of type 81-717.2/714.2 were delivered to Hungary between 1979 and 1991, followed by two 81-717.2M/714.2M trainsets; all in service on lines M2 and M3, being used alongside the older type E-series trains built several years earlier. In 2015, a contract was signed on the modernization of the existing older subway cars on the metro. In 2016, the first subway train left Budapest and was delivered back to Metrovagonmash in Russia to be overhauled into type 81-717.2K/714.2K. The first train reentered service in March 2017, with the original DC motors replaced by Japanese Hitachi VVVF traction systems and motors. The remaining trains were delivered by August 2018. The 81-717.2K/714.2K trains look very similar to type 81-717.6/714.6 of the Moscow Metro on the outside. The units on line 2 were replaced by modern Alstom Metropolis vehicles.

==== Warsaw ====
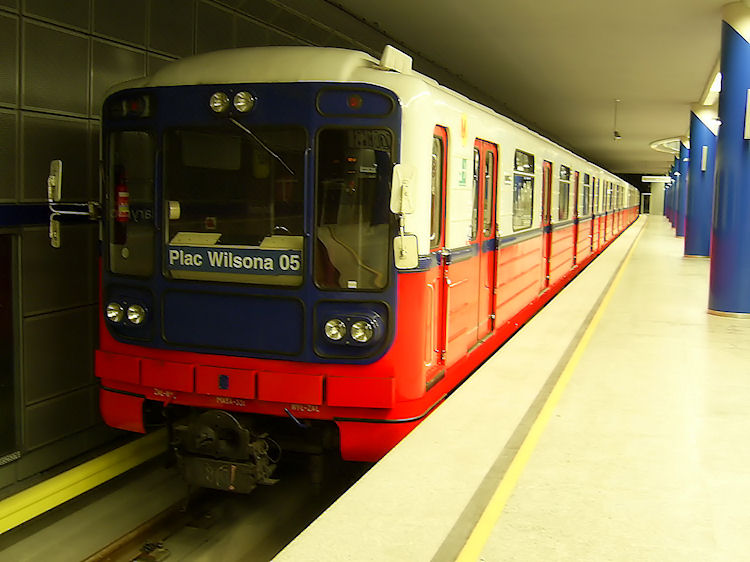
An 81-717.3/714.3 trainset in Warsaw.

In 1982, during Leonid Brezhniev's visit to the Polish People's Republic (a satellite state of the USSR), a contract was signed for the delivery of 90 rail-cars for the planned Warsaw Metro, portrayed as a gift to the Polish nation. Only ten 81-717.3/714.3 cars produced by Metrovagonmash in Mytishchi in 1989 were actually delivered to Poland. Before the first segment of the metro was opened in 1994 an additional 32 cars of the same type were purchased from Vagonmash in Sankt Petersburg, there designated as 81-572/81-573. The rail-cars were used to form 14 three-car train-sets operating with 5-minute intervals during peak-hours. In 1995 an additional 18 cars were ordered to extend the train-sets to four cars and add a fifteenth train-set by 1998. Since 2000 the metro began purchasing modern Alstom Metropolis rolling stock, however in 2005 an additional 30 cars of type 81-714.3 were purchased to extend the existing trains to six cars each and the cars in operation underwent modernization by PESA Bydgoszcz. In a controversial decision in 2007, a final seven new six-car 81-572.2/573.2 train-sets were ordered from Vagonmash.

Since 2012 the metropolitan has been again purchasing modern Siemens Inspiro rolling stock to expand its capacity due to the ongoing extension of its network. In 2020 a contract was signed with Škoda Transportation for 37 new Škoda Varsovia trainsets intended among others to replace the 22 aging Nomernoy trains. In 2023, all but two of the 81-series trains that were still in good technical condition were donated to Kyiv and Kharkiv in Ukraine, while the two trainsets that were kept remain in limited service to this day.

==== Sofia ====
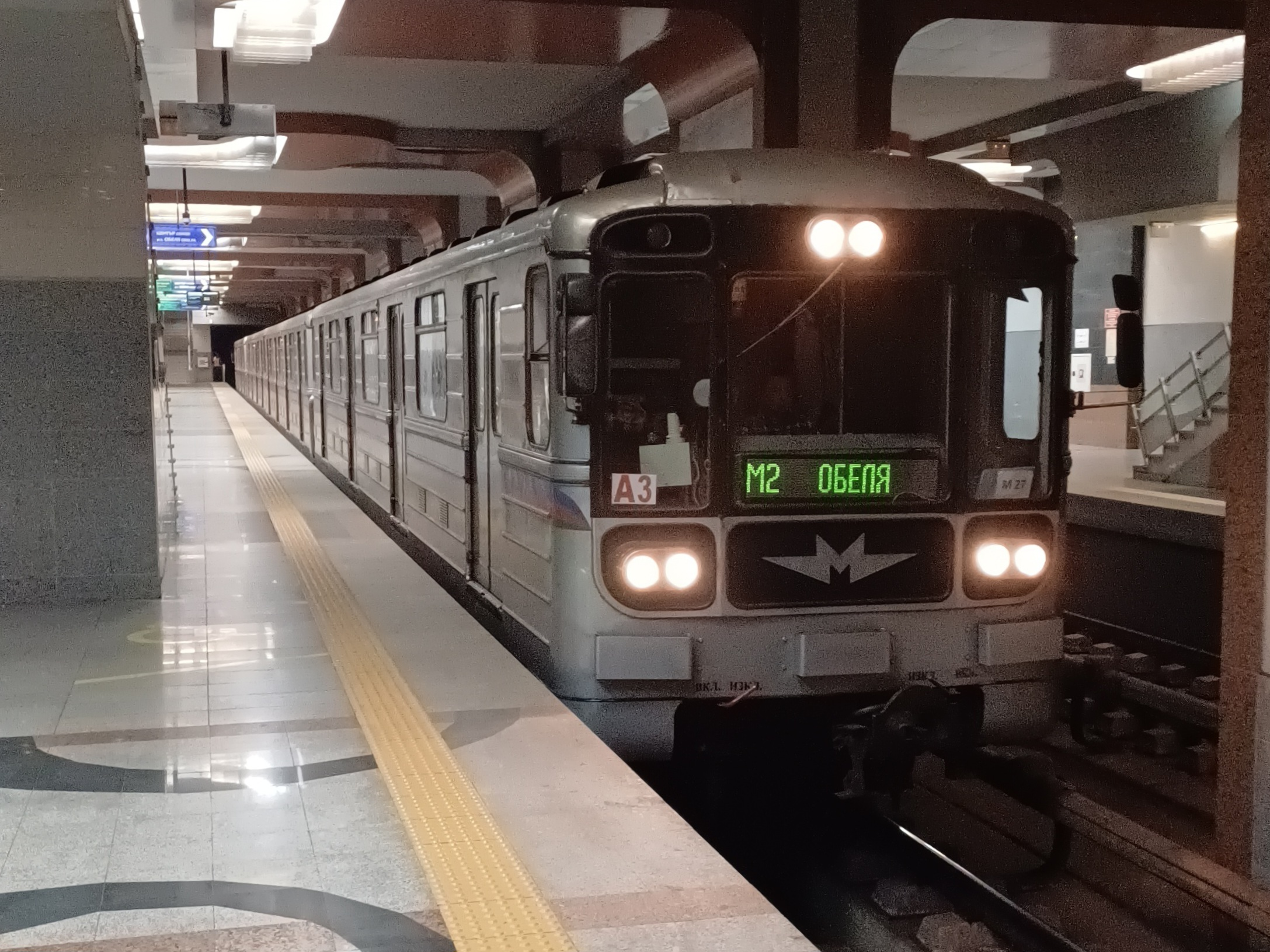
An 81-717.4/714.4 trainset in Sofia. Note the LED display board.

Forty-eight carriages (twenty-four 81-717.4 head ones numbered 1001 – 1024, and twenty-four 81-714.4 intermediate ones numbered 5001 – 5024) of type 81-717.4/714.4 were manufactured by MMZ in 1989 – 90 and delivered to Bulgaria in 1990. They entered service as early as 1995, although it was not until the metro's official opening on 28 January 1998 that they started carrying passengers. Initially, the trains consisted of three carriages – two head ones and an intermediate one due to small passenger numbers, while today they are all formed up of four carriages (two head ones and two intermediate ones), allowing for twelve four-car trains in total.

In late 2018, the Municipality of Sofia signed a contract for the modernization of all 81-717.4/714.4 trainsets with Metrovagonmash. The first two refurbished trains were delivered in early 2020 as 81-717.4K/81-714.4K rolling stock, followed by an additional six modernized trains delivered in 2022. However, the last four 81-717.4/714.4 trainsets couldn't be modernized due to sanctions imposed on Metrovagonmash by the European Union following the Russian invasion of Ukraine.

The lifespan of the refurbished 81-717.4/714.4 trains has been prolonged by at least fifteen years.

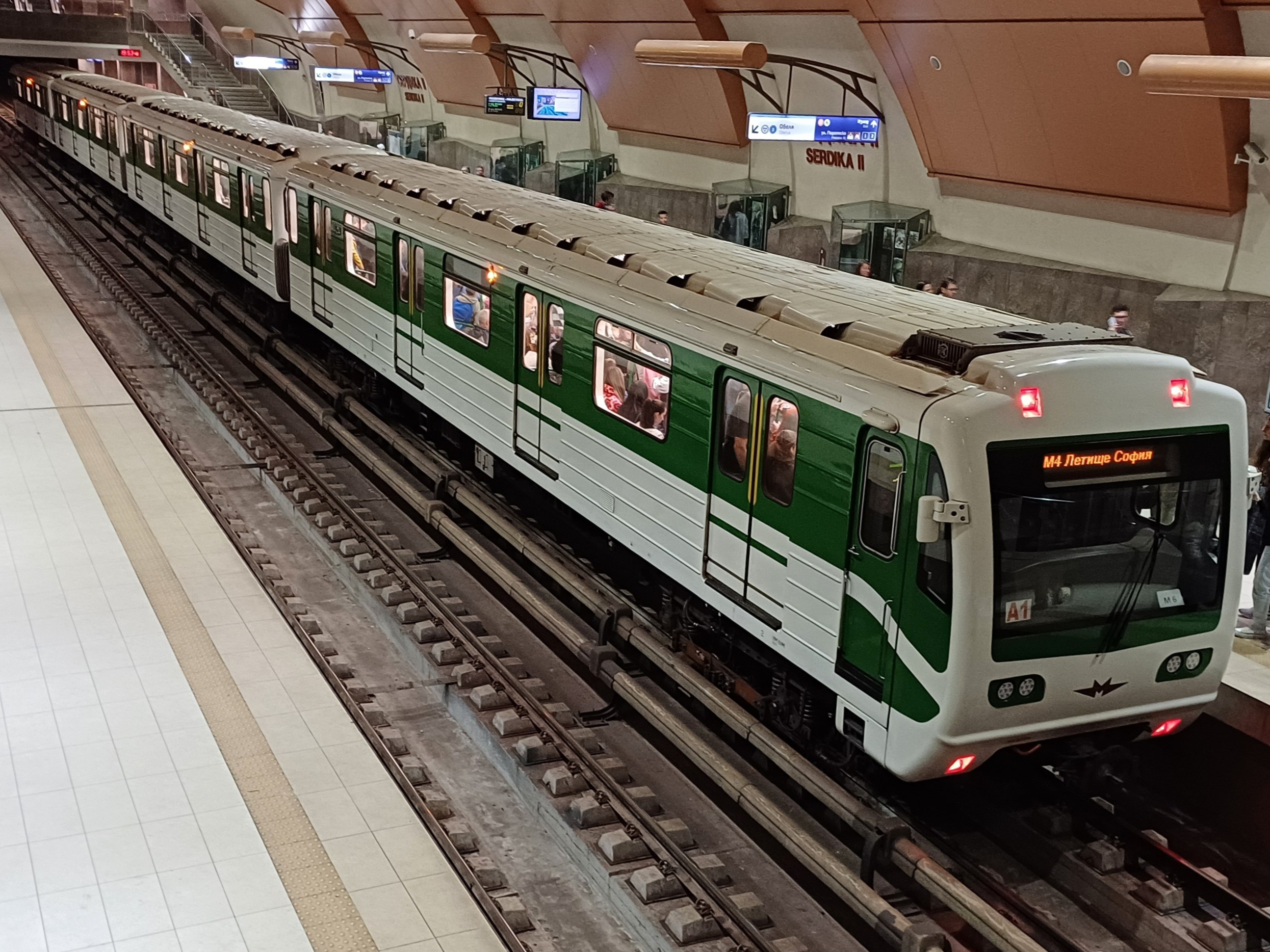
A 81-717.4K/714.4K trainset in Sofia.

The 81-717.4K/714.K trainsets look very similar to the 81-717.2K/714.2K rolling stock in Budapest, though there are a few notable differences between the two models. For instance, in Budapest, the driver's cabin has two front windows and the primary display board on the outside is positioned on the upper left side of the train's head mask, while in Sofia the driver's cabin has only one front window and the main display board on the outside is positioned at the upper middle of the head mask. Additionally, the interior display announcements in Budapest are made on TVs, while in Sofia there are two display boards on each end of every carriage serving the same purpose.

Since November 2023 Bulgaria is the only non-Soviet, post-socialist European country where original 81-717/714 rolling stock is running on a daily basis.

In 2023 – 24, the Municipality of Sofia ordered a total of sixteen trains from Škoda Transportation so as to ease the passenger flow when new stations are opened and potentially allow for the retirement of the last four non-refurbished 81-717.4/714.4 trainsets. The first eight trainsets entered service in the summer of 2026. Despite this, the four remaining 81-717.4/714.4 trains are to be kept in service for an indefinite amount of time albeit running less often.

Both the original and the refurbished 81-717.4/714.4 trains are being operated by the Obelya train depot and serve the M1, M2, and M4 metro lines, running alongside Rusich and Škoda Sofia rolling stock.

== Technical ==
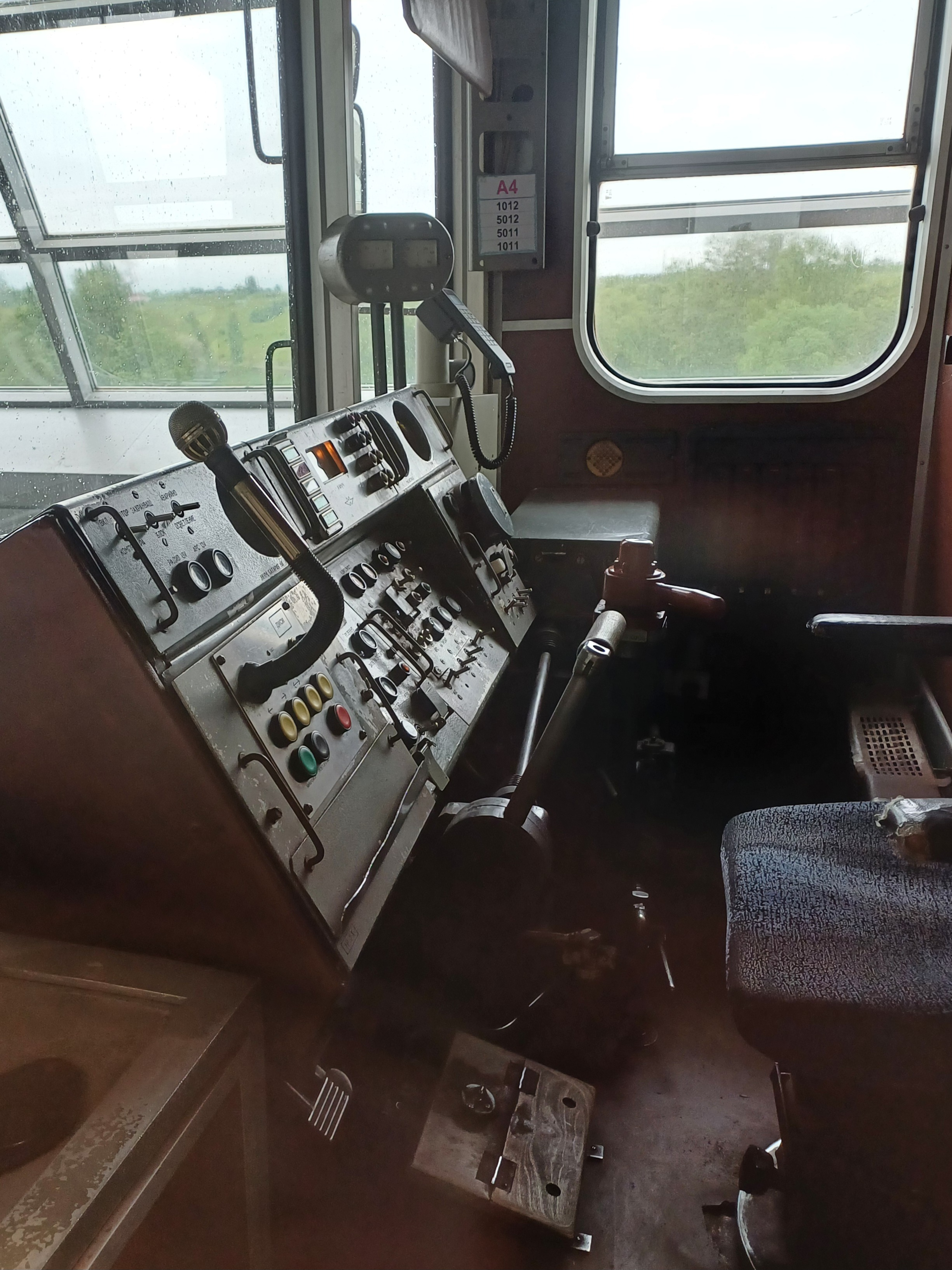
The driver's cabin of an 81-717.4 head car in Sofia.

The 81-717/714 cars in the former Soviet Union operate on metro networks with 1,524 mm (5 ft) and 1,520 mm (4 ft 11 27/32 in) Russian gauges. The Sofia, Budapest, Warsaw and Prague metro networks use 1,435 mm (4 ft 8 1/2 in) standard gauge. Trains receive power from the third rail via a bottom-contact shoe at either 750 or 825 volts, except in Budapest, which uses top-contact shoes.

=== Composition of the trains ===
The trains usually have a flexible formation, of 2 control cars at each end, and a variable number of trailer cars in the middle. Thus, a train can have only 1 car in the middle, or up to 6, making 3 to 8 car formations. However, a notable exception is Yerevan, where trains there can operate even with no trailer cars.

=== Interior fittings ===
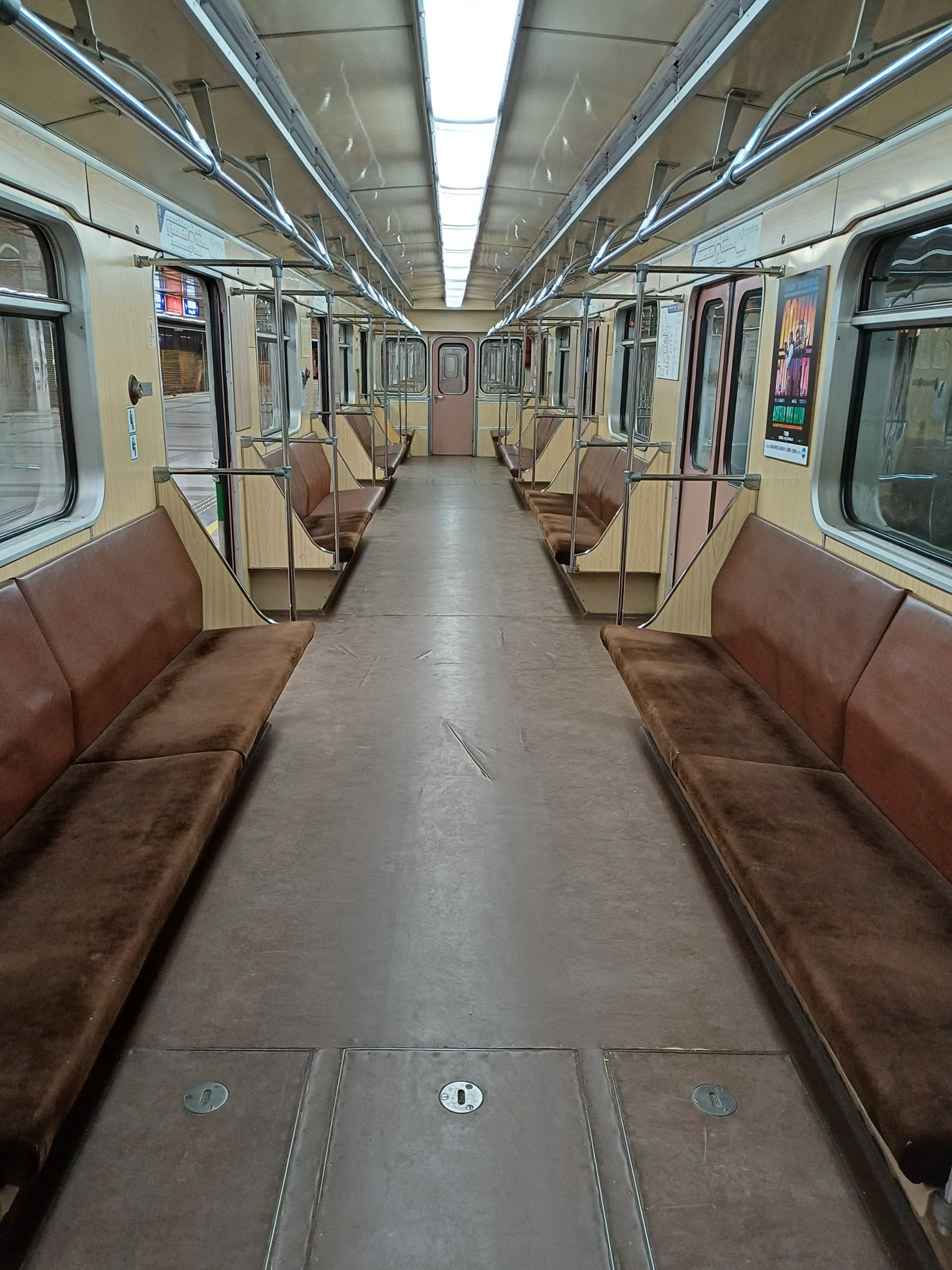
The interior of an 81-714.4/714.4 trainset in Sofia.

Like all metro trains of the now former Soviet Union, the 81-717/714 trains feature longitudinal bench seating, which is placed to the walls of the cars between the doors and an empty central aisle. The passenger area is ventilated with the help of air vents on the roof of the car, along with small sliding windows.

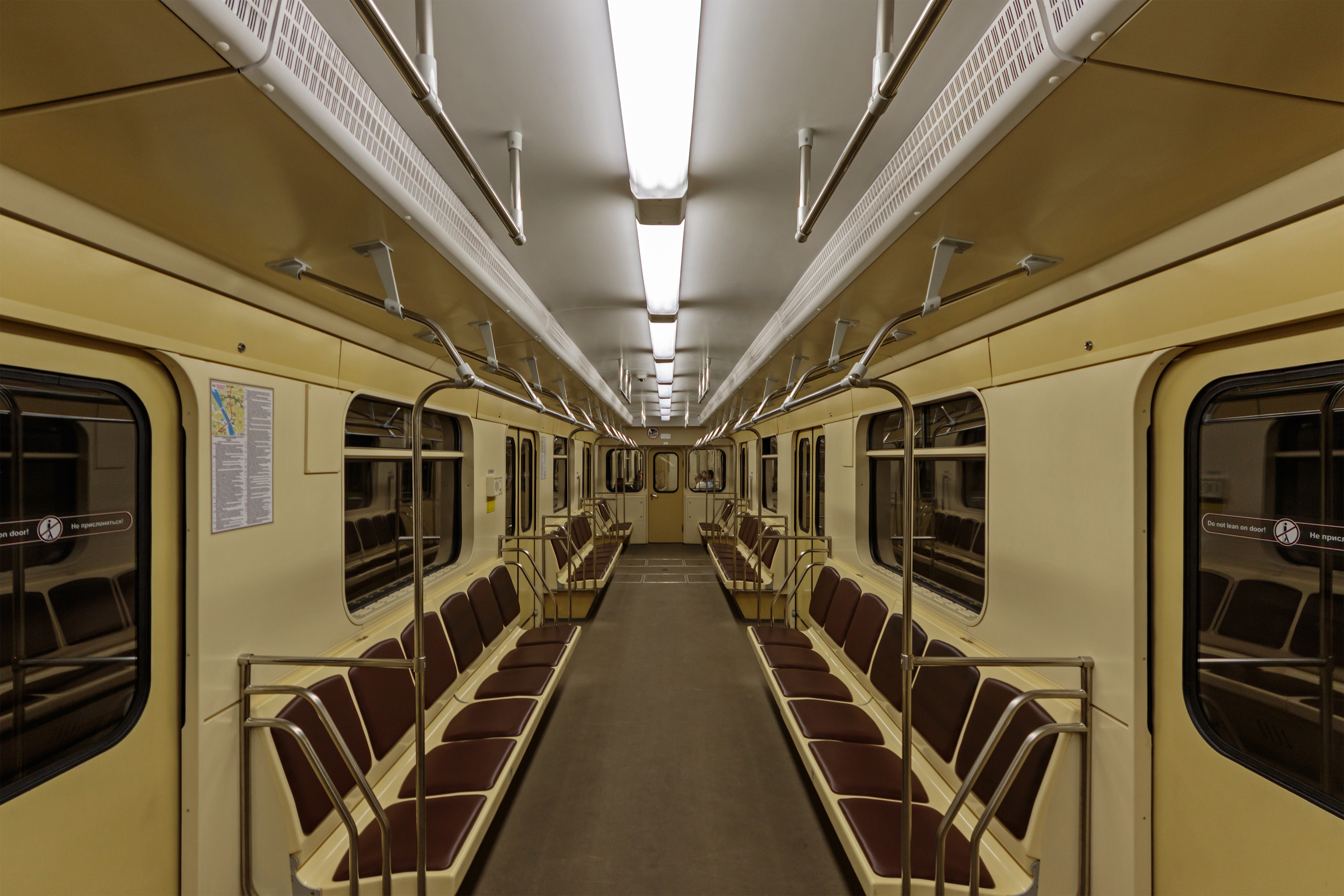
The interior of a refurbished 81-714.5M intermediate car in Novosibirsk, with vandal-proof seating instead of leather benches.

Originally, bench seats with hard leather trim were fitted on these cars, but they were subject to vandalism in the 1990s and 2000s, and thus, the new and the refurbished trains, as well as the later modifications of the model feature vandal-proof seating with a plastic base and leatherette linings, separate for each passenger. Sometimes, metal partitions can be added too. Overall, the bench seats can accommodate as many as 6 people (or 3 at the end sections), which means that the seating space in each car is 40, 44, or 48 (depending on the modification of the carriage), while seated.

While there are access doors between each car, passing from one car to the other while the train is moving is very dangerous, and due to this only staff permits such tasks usually. The doors can be used in an emergency, but they are sometimes used by zatsepers (Russian trainsurfers) to climb on the roof of the train on over-ground sections.

== Replacement ==
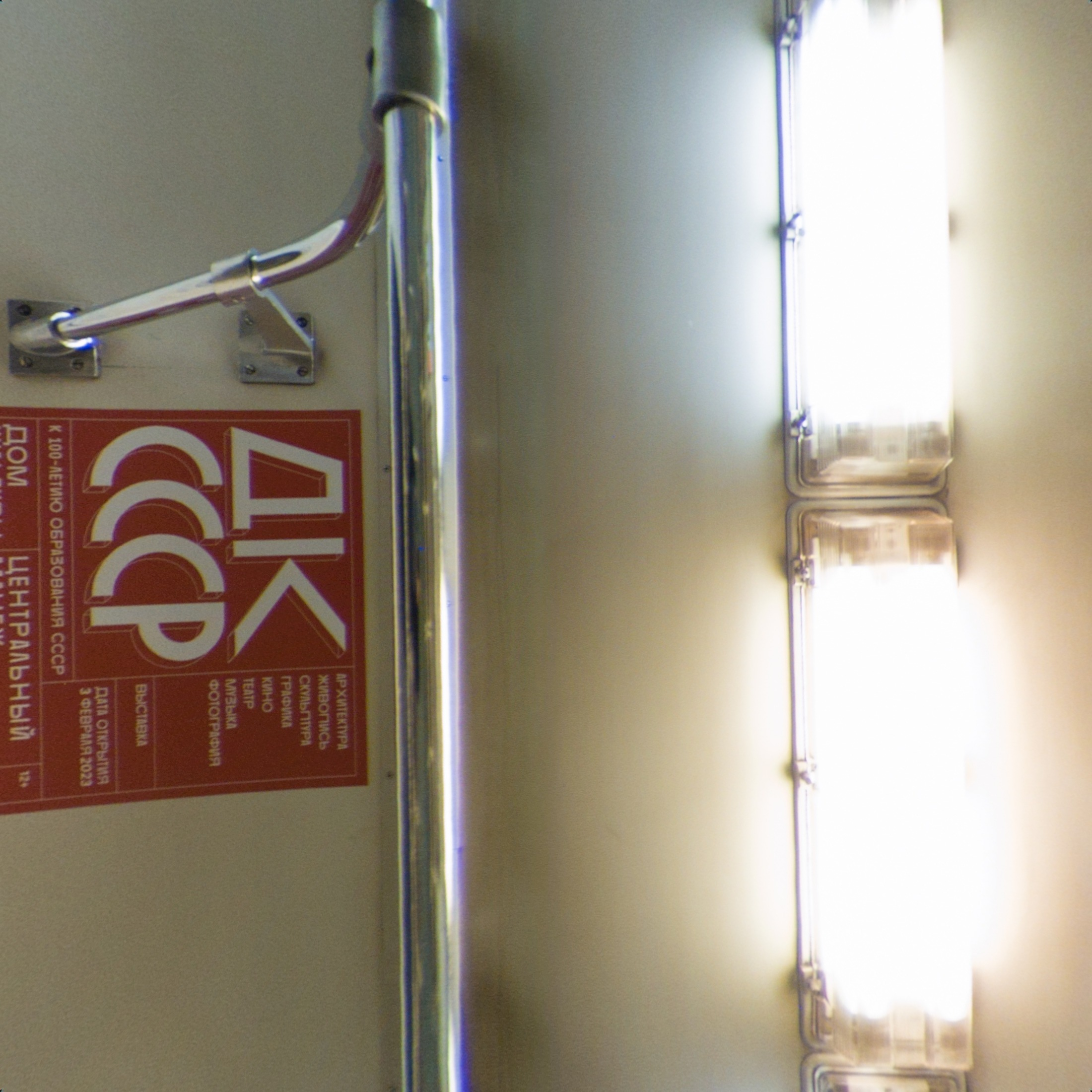
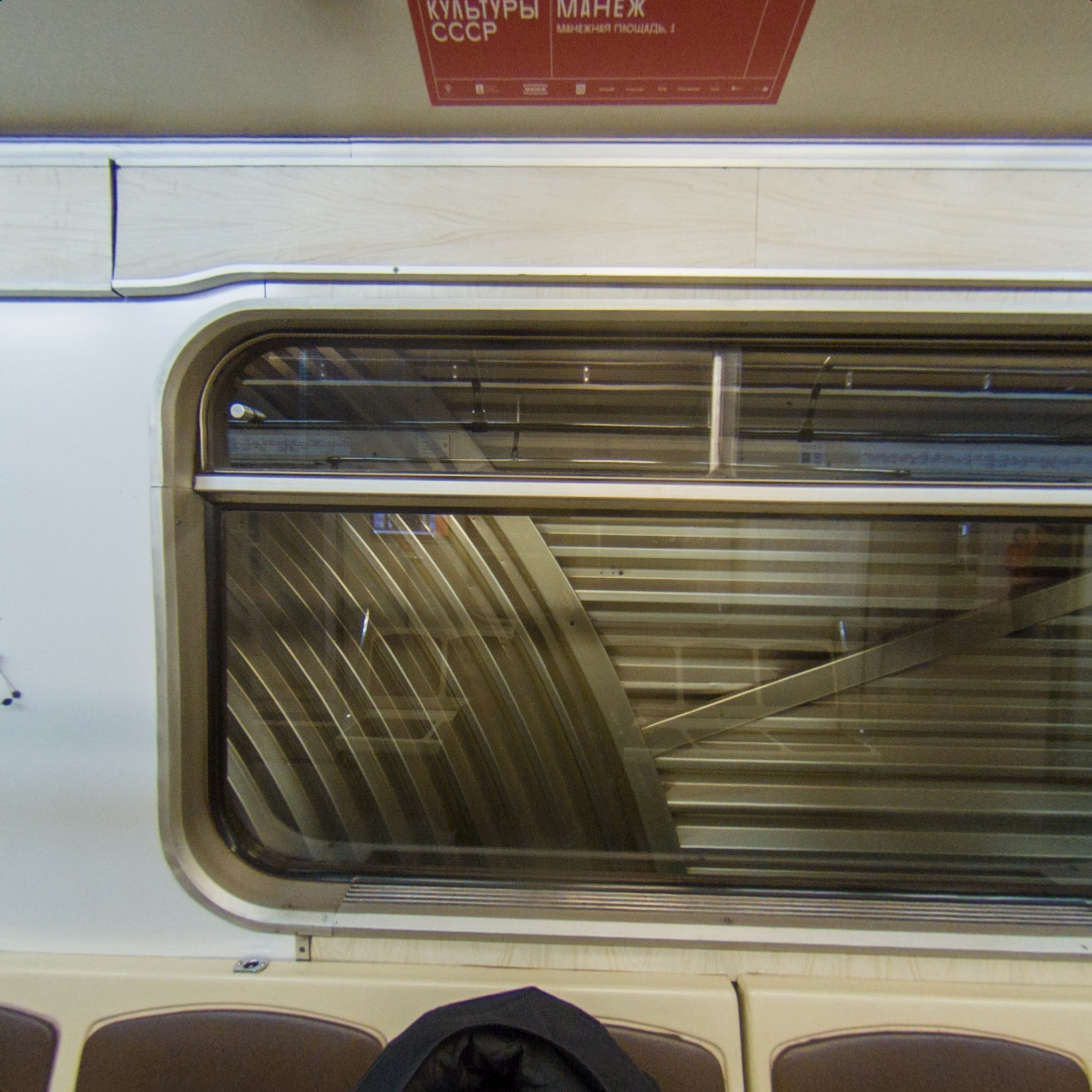
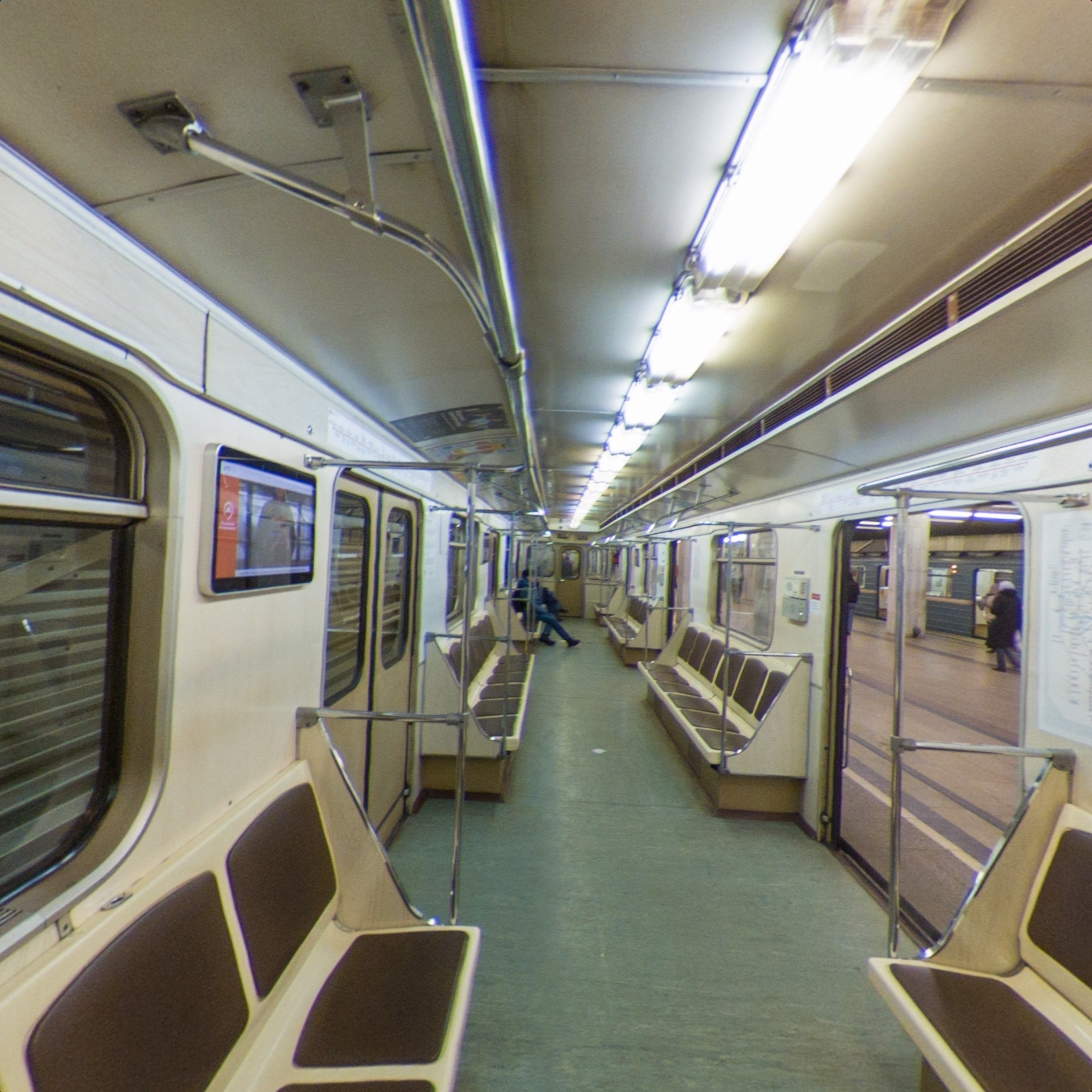
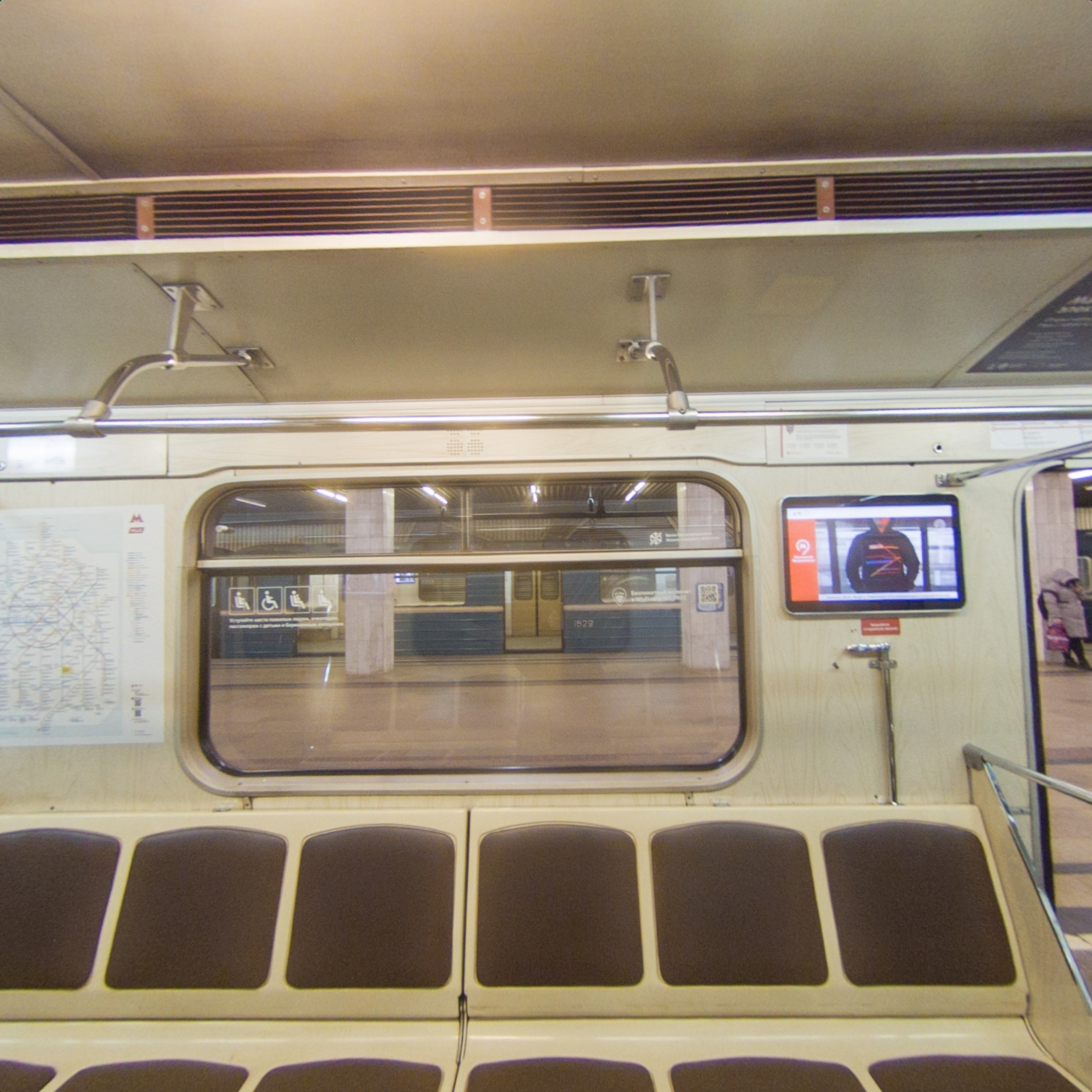
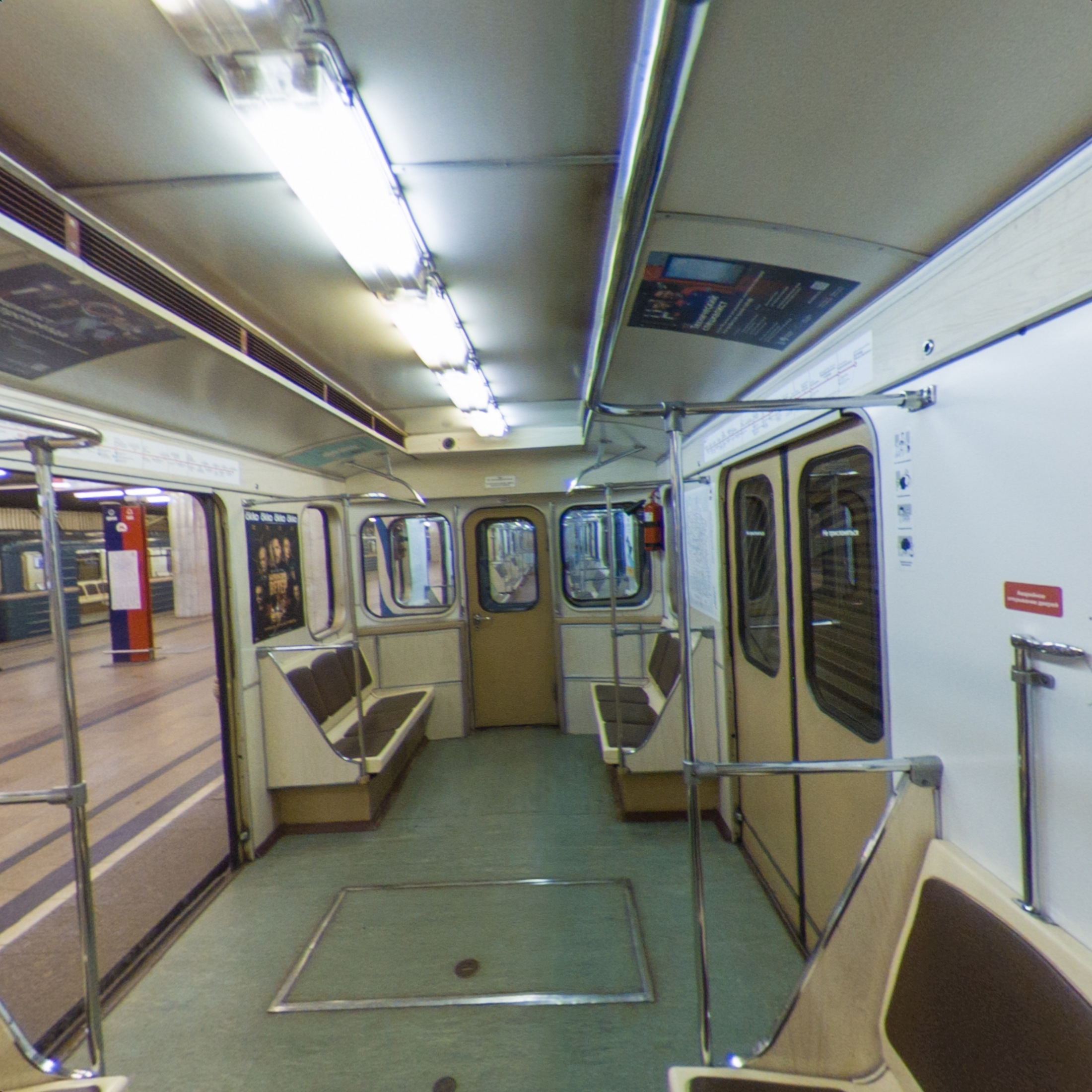
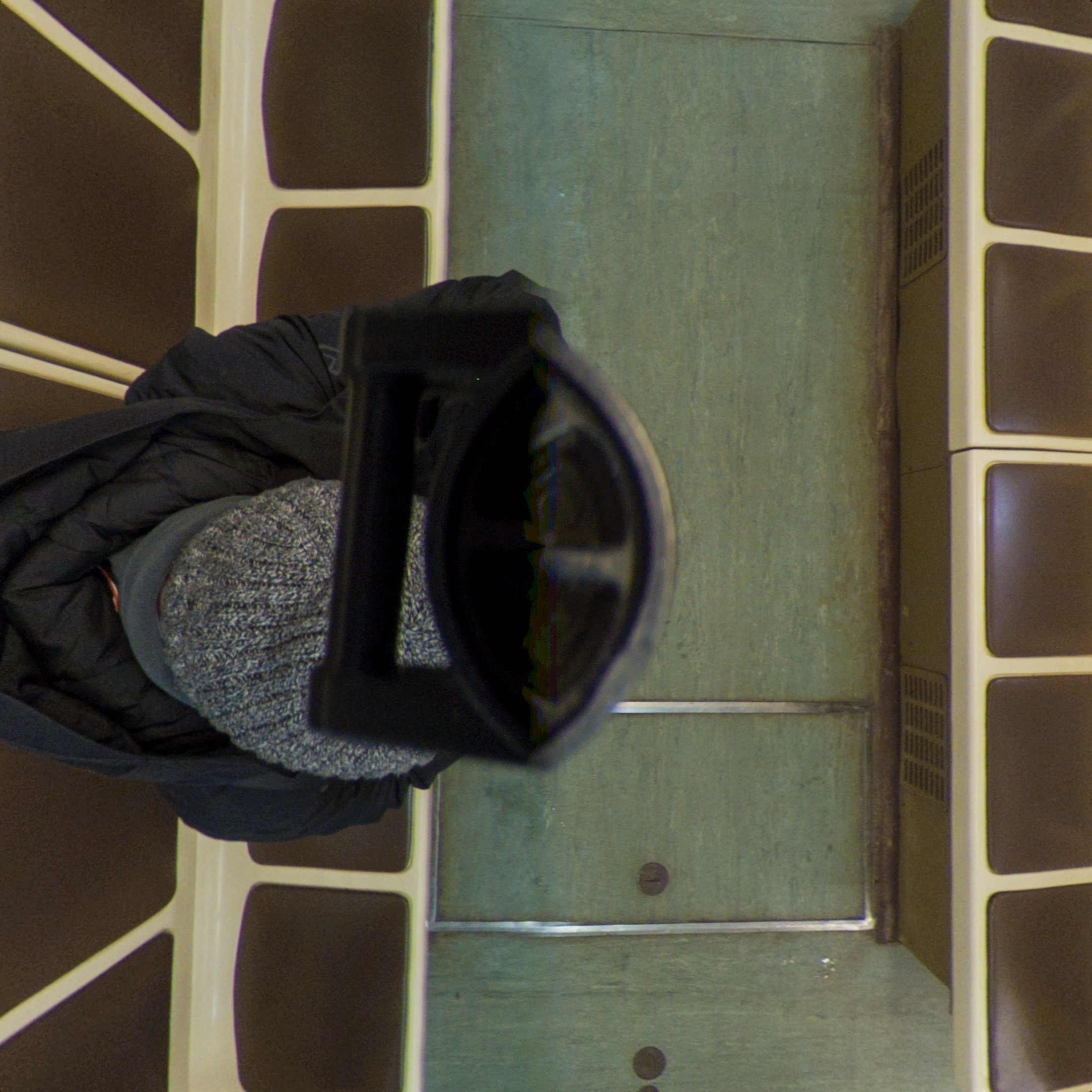
The interior of a refurbished 81-714 intermediate car in the Moscow Metro made by Metrovagonmash in the 2000s.

As the wear and aging of these trains began to be replaced with newer ones, but in different subways this happened differently, in the Moscow Metro as a replacement first were the trains Rusich, later Oka and Moscow. In Saint Petersburg, 81-556 Nevatrains are used as replacements. In Minsk, the 81-717 train started to run on new Stadler cars manufactured in the Fanipol suburb of Minsk. In Novosibirsk, some 81-717/714 trains were replaced by 81-540/541 units. In Baku, as well as in Moscow, 81-765 trains are used to replace the 81-717/714 trainsets, though 81-765 trains made for the Baku Metro are called Baku.

== In popular culture ==
=== Presence in filmography ===
- Original 81-717/714 trains were featured in the 1988 Soviet film Mobius Strip.
- In 2009, trainset A6 (type 81-717.4/714.4) of the Sofia Metro was used for the filming of the films Thick as Thieves and Ninja. Because the plot of the former was in the New York City Subway, the train was painted grey so that it looked like a NYC subway train. Slivnitsa Station, the oldest metro station of the Sofia Metro, was also decorated as a typical New York subway station for the duration of filming. It was later decided to paint all the 81-717.4/714.4 trains of the Sofia Metro grey on the outside; to this day, the exterior of the last four remaining 81-717.4/714.4 trainsets is such.
- An 81-717.5/714.5 train of the Moscow Metro was used for the filming of the film Metro in 2013.
- A 81-717.2/714.2 set from the Budapest Metro was used in the 2017 movie Atomic Blonde.

=== Elsewhere ===
Many mobile and video games have depicted the 81-717/714 through the years, some making recreations of the model and its various modifications. There are also many real-life models of such trains around the world.
