= Škoda Varsovia =

Series of metro cars built by Škoda Transportation

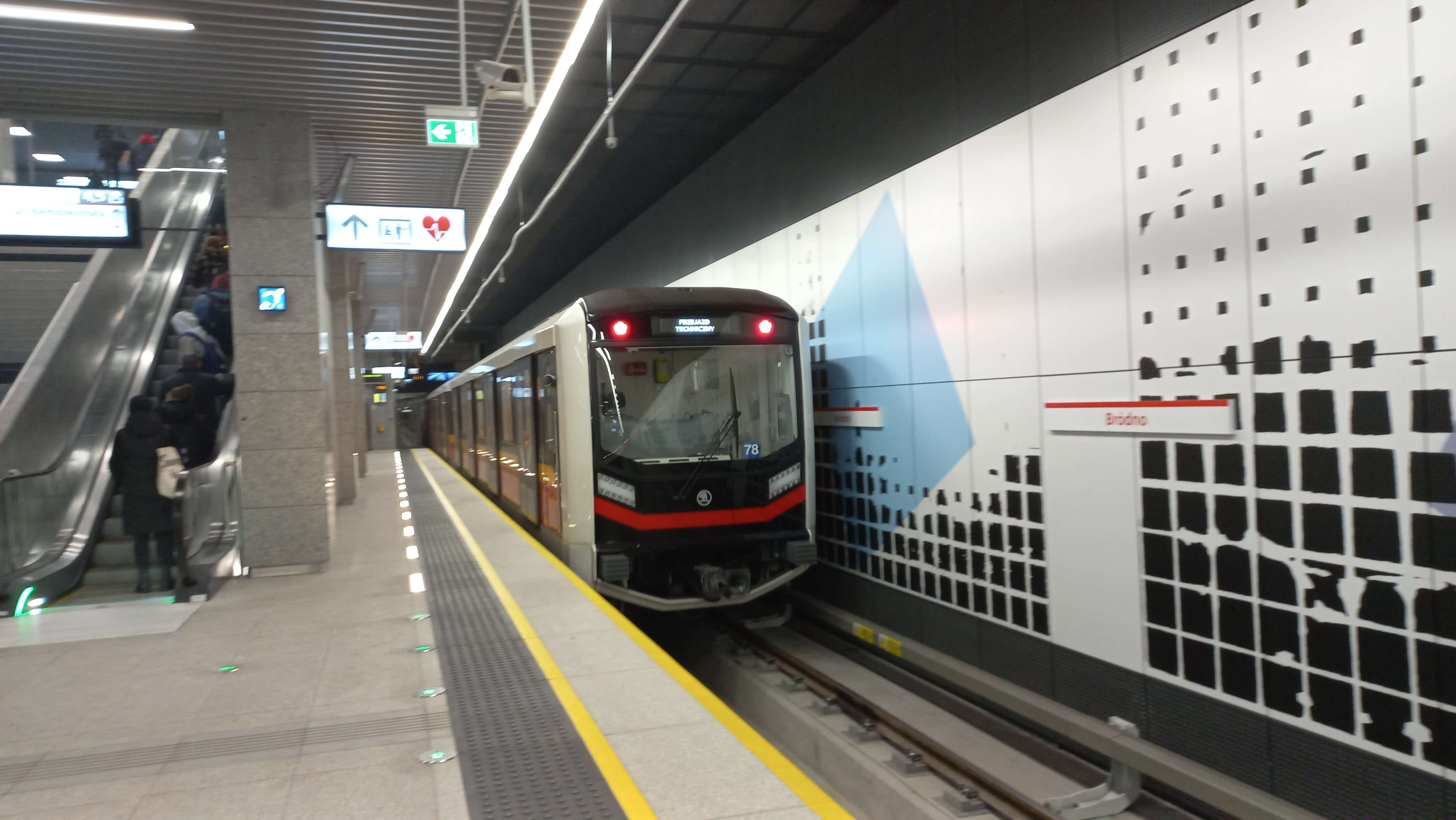
- Škoda Varsovia at the Bródno station in Warsaw, Poland, 2022.

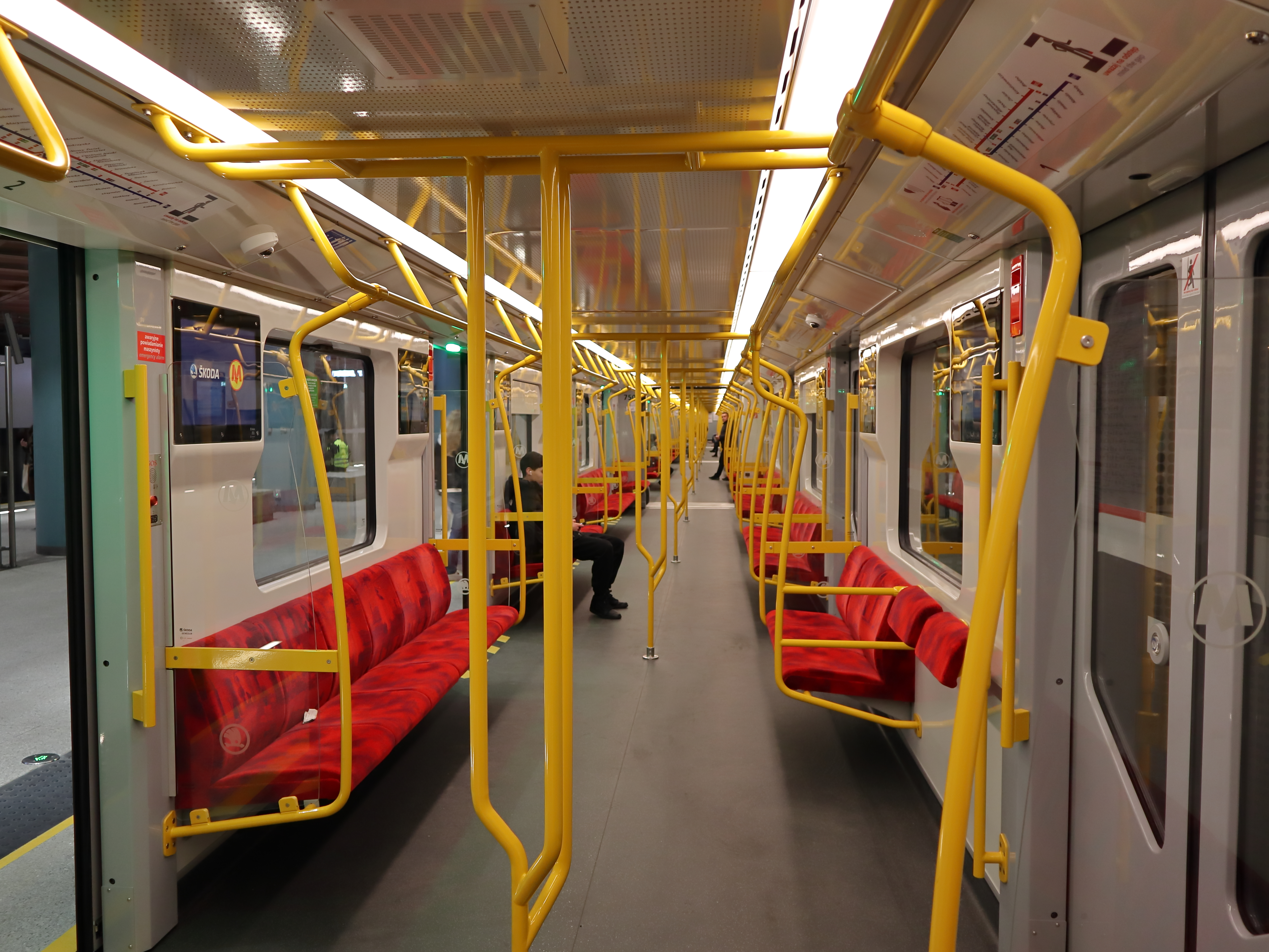
- In service: 2022–present
- Manufacturer: Škoda Transportation
- Replaced: Metrovagonmash 81-717/81-714
- Constructed: 2020–present
- Entered service: 28 October 2022 (Warsaw Metro); 26 May 2026 (Sofia Metro)
- Number under construction: 16
- Number built: 45
- Number in service: 45
- Capacity: 1500 passengers (across six cars)
- Operators: Warsaw Metro; Sofia Metro
- Depot: Kabaty (Warsaw Metro)
- Lines served: M1; M2

Specifications
- Car body construction: Aluminium
- Train length: 119.01 m (390 ft 5 3/8 in)
- Car length: 20 m (65 ft 7 3/8 in)
- Width: 2.71 m (8 ft 10 3/4 in)
- Height: 3,665 mm (12 ft 1/4 in)
- Floor height: 1.14 m (3 ft 8 7/8 in)
- Doors: 4 per side per car
- Maximum speed: 90 km/h (56 mph)
- Axle load: 125 kN (28,000 lb_{f})
- Acceleration: 1.2 m/s^{2} (3.9 ft/s^{2})
- Deceleration: 1.3 m/s^{2} (4.3 ft/s^{2}); 1.4 m/s^{2} (4.6 ft/s^{2})
- Electric systems: 750 V DC third rail
- Current collection: Contact shoe
- Minimum turning radius: 70 m (229 ft 8 in)
- Track gauge: 1,435 mm (4 ft 8 1/2 in) standard gauge

The Škoda Varsovia (Note: Varsovia in Latin translates to Warsaw.) is an electric multiple unit train type developed by Škoda Transportation and operated by the Warsaw Metro in Poland, as their sixth and latest generation of rolling stock, with 37 six-car trainsets. The production of the trains was launched in 2019, and the first unit entered regular passenger service in 2022. A modified version is operated by the Sofia Metro in Bulgaria.

== History ==
In 2019, Škoda Transportation, a company based in Plzeň, Czech Republic, was awarded a contract worth 1,308 billion Polish złoty for 37 six-car trainsets. The 222 cars—including 74 driver and 148 passenger cars—were to be delivered to the Warsaw Metro, where they would be used on the extended M2 route and also ultimately replace the old Metrovagonmash cars on the M1 line.

Many suppliers from Poland participated in the type's development and production. The aluminum cabins were welded and varnished in the Škoda Vagonka factory in Ostrava, Czech Republic, and the final assembly and testing took place in Plzeň. The contract also included the preparation of a simulator training programme, as well as an extended warranty and spare parts. The first set was presented in December 2021, on the company test track in Plzeň.

In February 2022, the sets began testing at the Velim railway test circuit in Cerhenice, Czech Republic. The first train, designated number 77, was delivered to Warsaw on 25 April 2022. This marked the beginning of the three-month period of homologation testing. The tests were conducted at the Kabaty technical and parking station. Another train, designated number 76, was delivered to Warsaw at the end of May 2022. On the night from 24 to 25 May 2022, the first test run without passengers took place on the M1, from the Kabaty technical and parking station to the Stokłosy metro station and back. In the following nights, more driving tests were conducted, and the length of the route was extended to the city centre. These tests checked the track compatibility, as well as communication and security systems.

On 19 August 2022, Škoda Transportation applied for a certificate of the acceptance of the trains into service and, after completing the documentation, received it from the Railway Transportation Office on 28 September 2022 for a fixed period.

The first day of public service was on 28 October 2022. On that day, unit number 78 left the Kabaty depot at 10:30 and arrived at the Kabaty metro station at 10:38 from where it proceeded to carry passengers across the M1 line. The next day, on 29 October 2022, the trains also began service on the M2 line. The Warsaw Metro also declared the possibility of donating the old Soviet-era Metrovagonmash 81-717/81-714 cars to the Kyiv Metro.

In 2023, the Sofia Metro in Bulgaria ordered eight four-car Varsovia trainsets for 65 million euros. The cars will be modified with more powerful air conditioning units, designed for the local climate. The first tests of the trains in the city were conducted in October 2025. They are scheduled to enter service in 2026, on lines M1, M2, and M4. The first four trainsets entered service on 26 May 2026.

On 12 November 2026, Škoda Transportation announced it will supply an additional 16 trainsets to Sofia. They are all scheduled to be delivered within the next two years.

== Characteristics ==
The cars are made from aluminium. A six-car-long set has 230 seats, including 2 disability seats, and can carry 1,500 passengers. Each car has 41 seats, except for the car with a driver's cabin, which has 33 seats.

The trains are adapted to standard-gauge rails with a track gauge of 1,435 mm (4 ft 8 1/2 in). The train cars' length is 20 m (65 ft 7 in), their width 2.71 m (8 ft 11 in), and their height 3.665 m (12 ft 0.3 in). The height of the floor above the top of the rail is 1.14 m (3 ft 9 in). The length of a six-car set is 119.01 m (390 ft 5 in). The train voltage is 750 volts of direct current via the third rail. The maximum speed is 90 km/h (56 mph). Its acceleration is 1.2 m/s^{2}, and deceleration is 1.3 m/s^{2}, or 1.4 m/s^{2} during emergency braking. The minimal arc radius is 70 m (229 ft 8 in). The maximal axle load is 125 kN.
