= Janówek, Warsaw =

Neighbourhood in Warsaw, Poland

Janówek
- Neighbourhood
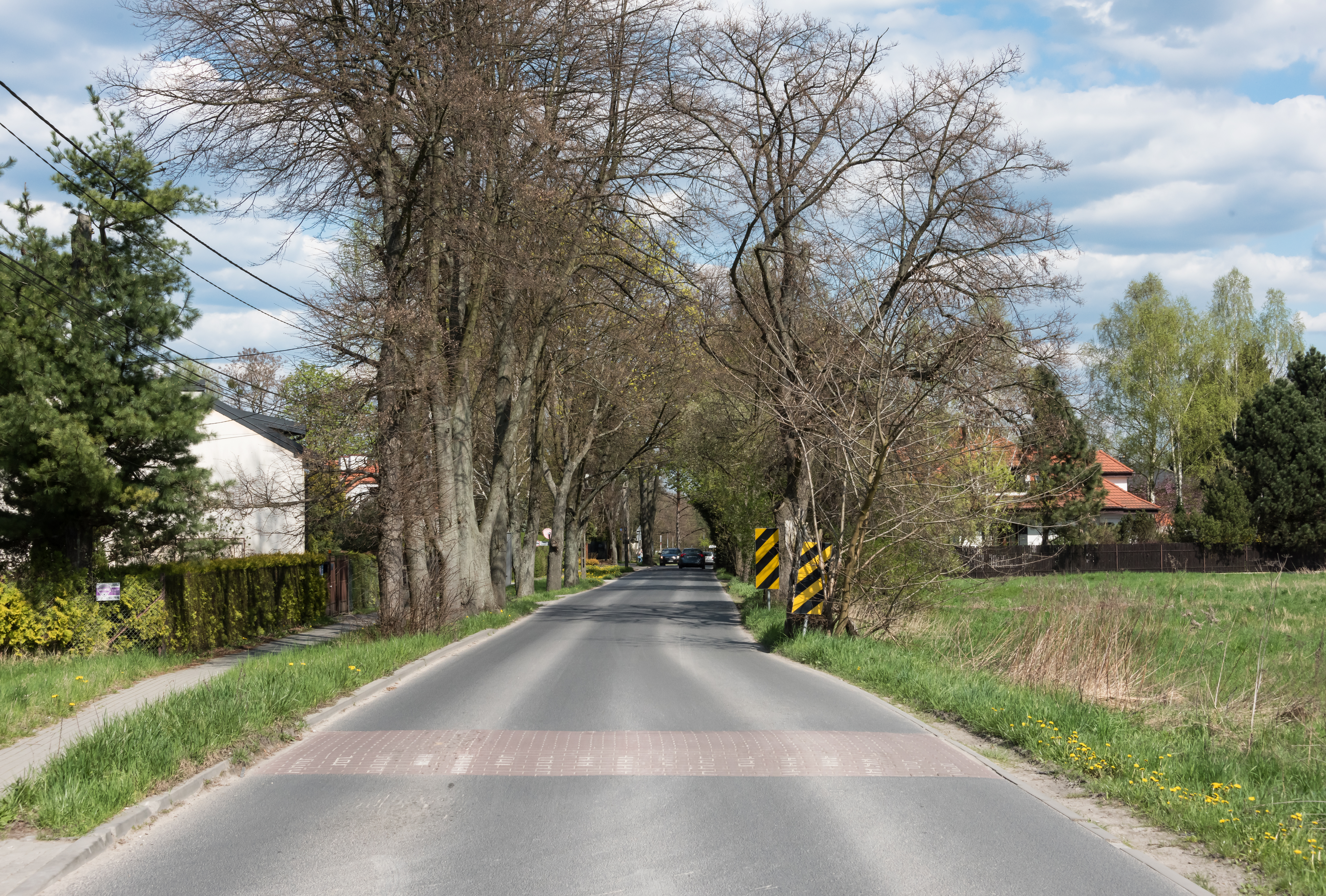
- Prawdziwka Street in 2023.
- Interactive map of Janówek
- Coordinates: 52°06′23″N 21°06′00″E
- Country: Poland
- Voivodeship: Masovian
- City and county: Warsaw
- District: Ursynów
- City Information System area: Skarpa Powsińska
- Time zone: UTC+1 (CET)
  - Summer (DST): UTC+2 (CEST)
- Area code: +48 22

Janówek (Polish: [jaˈnuv.ɛk]) is a neighbourhood in Warsaw, Poland, located within the district of Ursynów, within the City Information System area of Skarpa Powsińska. It is a small single-family housing neighbourhood, centred of Prawdziwka Street.

== History ==
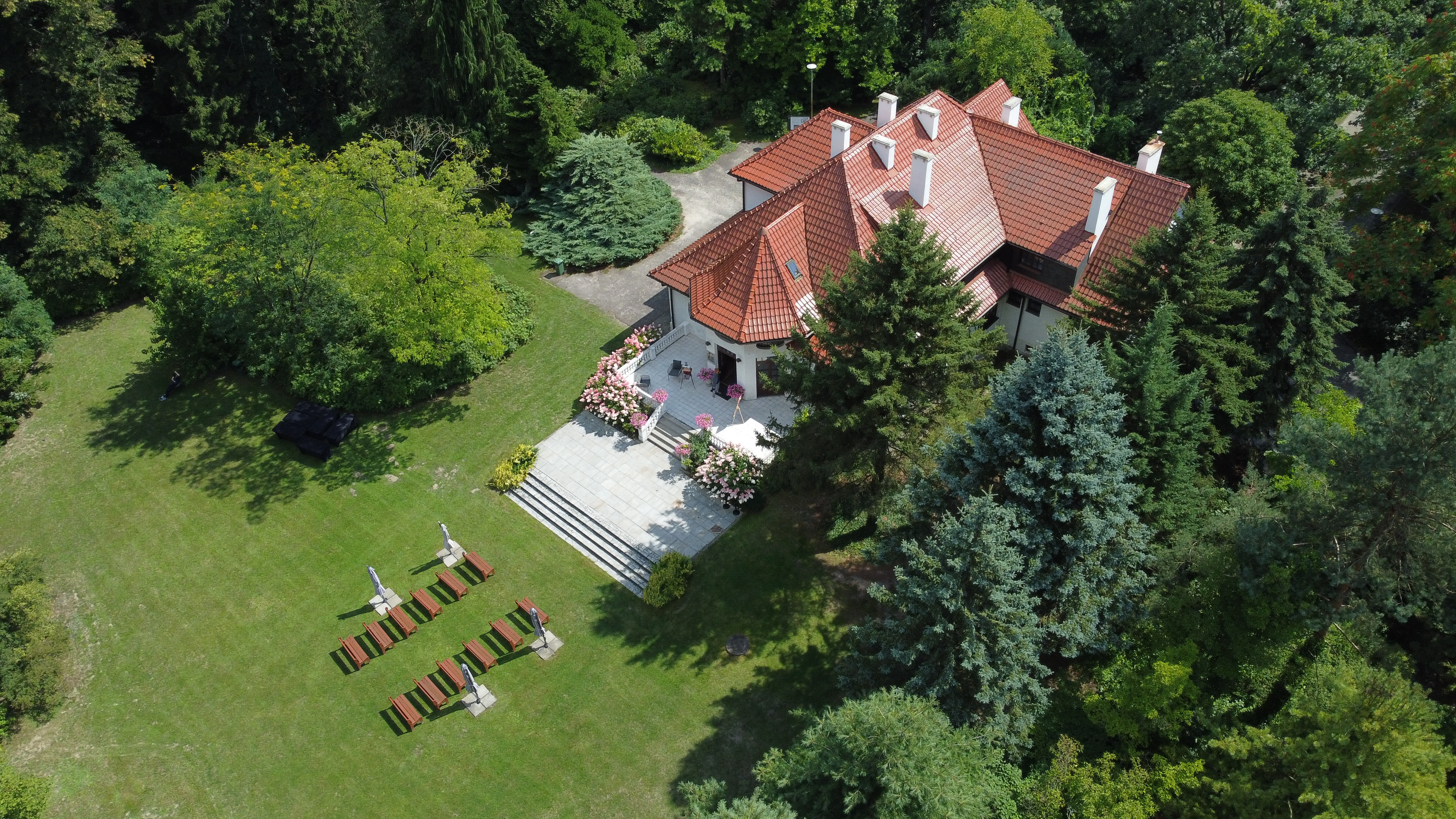
The Janówek Villa, a historical residence in Skarpa Powsińska, built in 1913.

In 1913, the Janówek Villa was constructed within thebcurrent Skarpa Powsińska, then part of the village of Klarysew. From 1928, it was the residence of the Fangor family. In 1943 artist Wojciech Fangor, created there a ceiling painting titled Pleiades, with mythological and astronomical motives.

By 1933, the village of Janówek was present in the area, being part of the municipality of Jeziorna.

In 1938, the Polski Country Club bought a 50-hectare-area from count Adam Branicki to build a golf course. In the 1940s, while under the German occupation during the Second World War, it was turned into farmland. In 1947, the land was donated to the city of Warsaw, to establish a recreational area, which became the Powsin Culture Park. On 15 May 1951, the area was incorporated into Warsaw.

In 1974, the Polish Academy of Sciences Botanical Garden and Powsin Centre for Biological Diversity Conservation was established within Skarpa Powsińska, with an area of 40 ha. It was developed between 1978 and 1990, and also incorporated the Janówek Villa, and its gardens.

== Characteristics ==
Janówek is a small neighbourhood with low-rise single-family housing, placed near Prawdziwka Street.

The Polish Academy of Sciences Botanical Garden and Powsin Centre for Biological Diversity Conservation at Polish Academy of Sciences Botanical Garden and Powsin Centre for Biological Diversity Conservation, is located to its west, at 2 Prawdziwka Street. It has an area of 40 ha, and includes over 10,000 species of plants in its collection, including numerous exotic and rare specimens. It is also a research facility of the Polish Academy of Sciences. Within its boundaries is also located the Janówek Villa, a historical 20th-century residence, which currently hosts plethora of cultural events, such as the Floralia Muzyczne classical music festival, organized by the Frédéric Chopin Society. The building also includes a 1943 ceiling painting with mythological and astronomical motives, titled Pleiades, by artist Wojciech Fangor, which has the protected status of cultural property. To its north, at 1 Maślaków Street, is also present the Powsin Culture Park, a recreational and sports area. Among its amenities are basketball and volleyball courts, swimming pool, and acoustical shell. It has an area of 50 ha.
