= Monika Weiss =

Polish-American contemporary artist

- Weiss in 2021
- Born: 1964 (age 61–62); Warsaw, Poland
- Known for: Installation, Video, Performance
- Website: www.monika-weiss.com

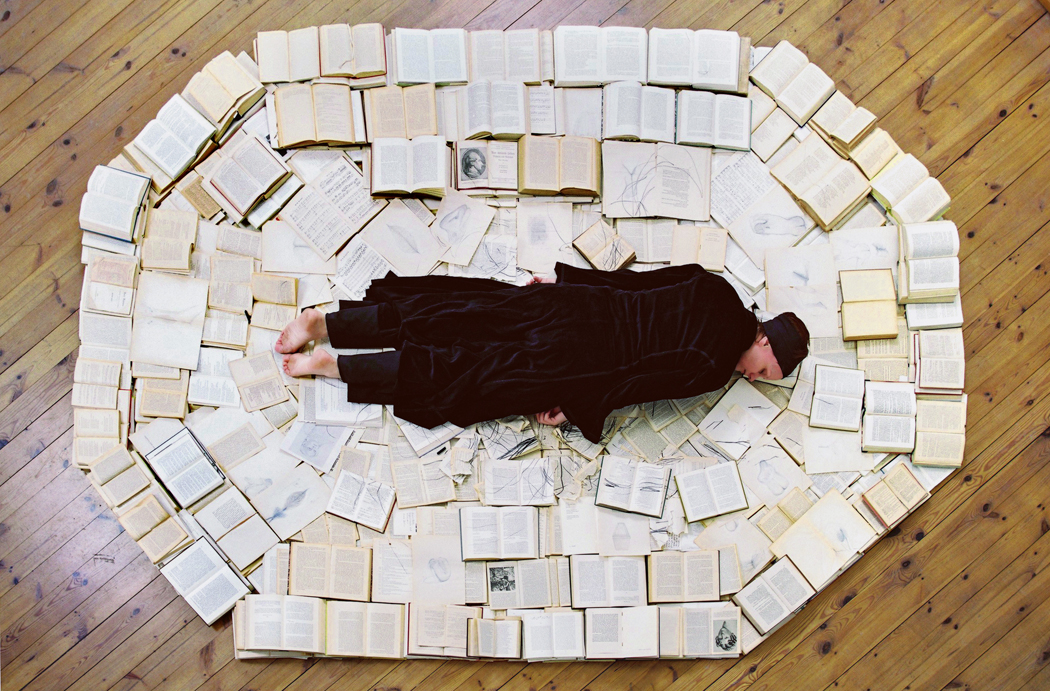
Phlegethon-Milczenie (2005). Self-shot photography, performance, books, projected video, sound. Collection: Cisneros Fontanals Art Foundation, Miami.

Monika Weiss (born 1964, in Warsaw) is a Polish-American contemporary artist based in New York City. She works primarily with Installation, video projection, performance, sound and drawing. Her transdisciplinary approach investigates relationships between body and history, and evokes ancient rituals of lamentation.

== Education ==
Weiss, the daughter of a concert pianist, studied piano and classical music from 1970-1984. She attended The Academy of Fine Arts in Warsaw from 1984-1989, where she studied painting and drawing under Ryszard Winiarski, Stefan Gierowski and Marian Czapla. She was an Artist in Residence at The Academy of Fine Arts In Łódź (1994-1995), Spelman College in Atlanta (1996), the Georgia State University School of Art and Design (1997-1998), The University of Maryland (1999) and at The School of The Art Institute of Chicago (2002).

== Career ==
Weiss's early works from the 1980s and early 90s consisted mostly of drawings and paintings of human figures. The drawings were made with ink mixed with paint and she often built collages on large sheets of paper from them. Later the artist's work expanded to include installations, video and sound projects.

Her work has been exhibited in over twenty solo exhibitions and numerous group exhibitions internationally. In 2005, Lehman College Art Gallery organized and published a retrospective of the artist's work since 1999, Monika Weiss: Five Rivers. In 2006, Weiss was commissioned to create Drawing Lethe at the World Financial Center, a large scale public project curated by the Drawing Center in New York. Her work has been featured at Cisneros Fontanals Art Foundation CIFO, Miami (Forms of Classification: Alternative Knowledge and Contemporary Art, 2007; The Prisoner’s Dilemma: Selections from the Ella Fontanals-Cisneros Collection, 2009), and she was part of Prague's Muzeum Montanelli (MuMo)’s inaugural show in 2010.

Some other notable exhibitions include Moment by Moment: Meditations of the Hand at North Dakota Museum of Art, Grand Forks (2006); On the Absence of Camps at Kunsthaus Dresden (2006); POZA: On the Polishness of Polish Contemporary Art at Real Art Ways, Hartford (2008); and Frauen bei Olympia at Frauenmuseum, Bonn (2009). Weiss has exhibited alongside and collaborated with artists such as Carolee Schneemann, Mona Hatoum, Francis Alys, and Stephen Vitiello among others.

Weiss has given lectures on her work at institutions around the world and her writings have appeared in numerous publications, including New Realities: Being Syncretic (Springer, Wien/New York) and Technoetic Arts (Intellect, London).

In 2009 she received the New York Foundation for the Arts award in the interdisciplinary art category. She splits her time between New York and St. Louis, where she is an associate professor at the Sam Fox School of Design & Visual Arts at Washington University in St. Louis and faculty affiliate in the Performing Arts Department.

In 2022, Weiss participated in the historical survey of Polish feminist art, Sleepless in Warsaw, at A.I.R. Gallery in New York City. A review in ARTnews highlighted the role of sound in her composition, METAMORPHOSIS/DAFNE (NIRBHAYA).

Weiss's work was the subject of a 2025 solo exhibition at the Silas Von Morisse Gallery in New York. The exhibition focused on her drawings, which she compared to "aquatic worlds and volcanic matter".

Wiess had a series of painting from 2021-2025 of paintings she has created called "My First Series"

== Characteristics ==
=== Lamentation ===
A recurring motif in the artist’s work is the exploration of the ancient ritual of lament. Group mourning, she states, is more than a response to a specific grief; it can act as a political force. Historically a feminine expression, lamentation stands "in opposition to heroic, masculine fantasies of conquest and power." Through lamentation she draws attention to the complexities of history, incorporating "those who have been perennially absent: the victims and the defeated." According to art critic Adriana Valdes, lamentation is both an expression and a silence; it lacks articulation. Weiss's work focuses on this lack of articulation, "the moment when language collapses in face of the loss of the ability to signify."

=== Body ===
Weiss uses her body as an artistic tool, as a vehicle and a palette. Often she employs her body in repetitive and monotonous movements within specific limitations, such as submerging herself at long lengths in a concrete receptacle filled with water (Ennoia) or by rolling around, tracing her silhouette on materials such as sheets of canvas (Leukos) or a bed of books (Phlegethon-Milczenie).

=== Performance ===
Her performances lack dramaturgical plot. They are noted for their syncopated rhythms, which serve to “both disrupt and, paradoxically, prolong time.” She “provides an alternative experience of space and time, which is not end-driven but steady and enduring.”

=== Drawing ===
Drawing has been described as the touchstone of her art. It often ties together the various aspects of her art, the technological with the corporeal, the communal with the solitary.

== Featured works ==
=== Ennoia ===
Enacted in 2002 at the Diapason Gallery in New York, the installation involved the artist immersing herself in a concrete basin full of water, emerging only periodically throughout the 6-hour duration of the performance. A camera suspended from the ceiling recorded the performance and the image of her submerged, curled up body was projected on a nearby wall, accompanied by sounds from below the surface of the water. As described by critic James D. Campbell, “The artist seemed to meld her own body to the contours of the water-filled sculpted basin in which it was submersed as though it were a secondary skin; a shell-like armature for her vulnerable body, providing protection. Like an embryo in vitro, the font was interpretable as exoskeleton containing a nourishing vat of amniotic fluid, replete with the waters of her life.”

=== Leukos ===
“Leukos” was an outdoor performance installation created on the grounds of Lehman College in the Bronx. It was part of a series of works titled “Intervals,” in which drawings were made by the artist and other participants by tracing their bodies. Over the course of two days the artist and other contributors rolled around on large sheets of cotton, for several hours at a time, tracing their silhouettes with crayons, graphite, and pigments, while wind and rain darkened and blurred the drawings. The cotton canvas was then installed in the gallery with a video of the performance projected on the wall behind it, accompanied by a soundtrack of opera arias. The New York Times wrote of the piece: “Partly, the work helps make us look at and think differently about the body, as an inert object, and partly it is all about collapsing together artistic genres - sculpture, installation, performance and drawing - in a way so wayward as to almost obviate art altogether.”

=== Phlegethon – Milczenie ===
For this installation in Potsdam, books - philosophical and literary publications from pre-war Germany – served as objects on which the artist crawled and drew, outlining her body while her eyes remained shut. In an adjacent room a continuous video was projected, based on the performance. In a review for The Gazette (Montreal), Henry Lehmann wrote, “Something that happens in Weiss's work, in what seems an objective manner, is that at some point the books quit being just books and become primarily art forms. They no longer ask to be read, but ask rather that we bear witness to their existence and perhaps see their yellowing pages as measures of time.”

=== Sustenazo ===
First installed in the cellars of the Ujazdowski Castle in Warsaw, the multi-media installation was inspired by an event that took place at the castle shortly after the onset of the Warsaw Uprising. In August 1944, the occupying German army ordered an immediate evacuation of nearly two thousand hospital patients. Many of the seriously ill patients died shortly thereafter. Weiss used original documents related to the hospital's evacuation along with other images and sounds. In the video, voices in Polish are broken up, overlaid with voices in German. An eighty-year-old Polish woman, who was a young nurse at the hospital, tells the story of her experience in Polish while another woman's voice reads passages in German from Faust II. The title, Sustenazo, is a Greek word, meaning “to sigh, to lament inaudibly together.” In her own words, “The act of ‘throwing out’ a hospital contradicts everything a hospital ought to be: a place where human lives are saved. Sustenazo evokes that event as a metaphor for war in general.”

The artist does not perform in Sustenazo and has not performed in other recent works as to avoid autobiographical interpretations. She also stresses that it is not solely about Polish or European history either. She explains, “It is more broadly about the loss of lives inflicted by war and by other political and organized acts of violence and oppression. For me, war is not only devastating: it is unacceptable.” Beginning in December 2012 one of the three videos from the exhibition, Sustenazo (Lament II), is being exhibited at the Museum of Memory and Human Rights in Santiago, Chile in a solo exhibition that includes an installation from antique books, medical instruments and artist's drawings. An accompanying catalogue of essays and interviews, Monika Weiss: Sustenazo (Lament II), was published in conjunction with the show.
