= Skarpa Powsińska =

Neighbourhood in Warsaw, Poland

- City Information System area (neighbourhood)
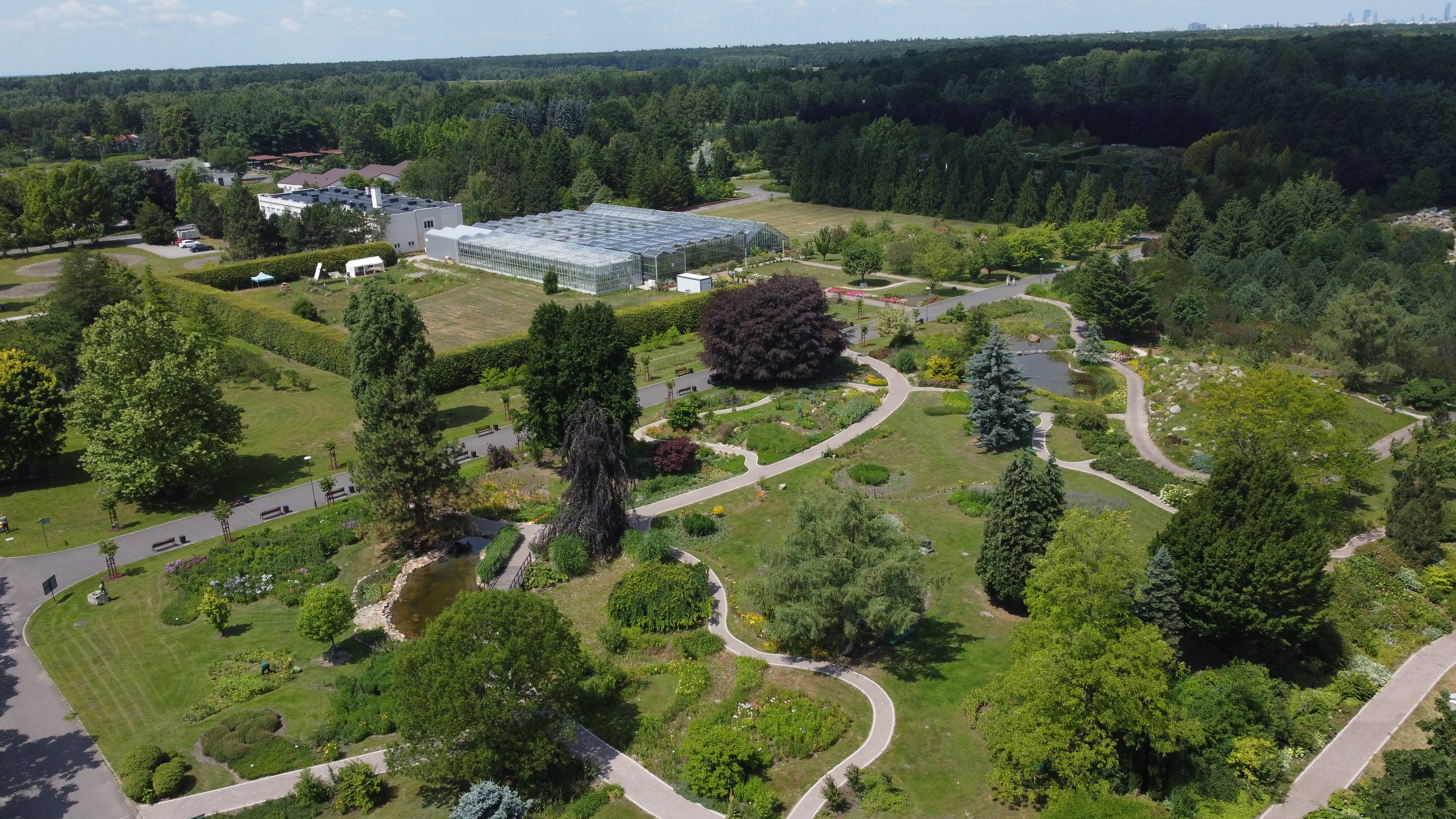
- The Polish Academy of Sciences Botanical Garden and Powsin Centre for Biological Diversity Conservation.

- Skarpa Powsińska within the Ursynów district.
- Coordinates: 52°06′23″N 21°05′38″E
- Country: Poland
- Voivodeship: Masovian
- City and county: Warsaw
- District: Ursynów
- Administrative neighbourhood: Prawdziwka
- Time zone: UTC+1 (CET)
  - Summer (DST): UTC+2 (CEST)
- Area code: +48 22

Skarpa Powsińska (Polish: [ˈskar.pa pɔf.ɕiɲ.ska]; lit. 'Powsin Escarpment') is a neighbourhood, and a City Information System area, in Warsaw, Poland, within the Ursynów district. The area includes two single-family neighbourhoods, Janówek and Łęczyca, as well as the Polish Academy of Sciences Botanical Garden and Powsin Centre for Biological Diversity Conservation, and the Powsin Culture Park. It also features the Janówek Villa, a historical residence dating to 1913.

== History ==
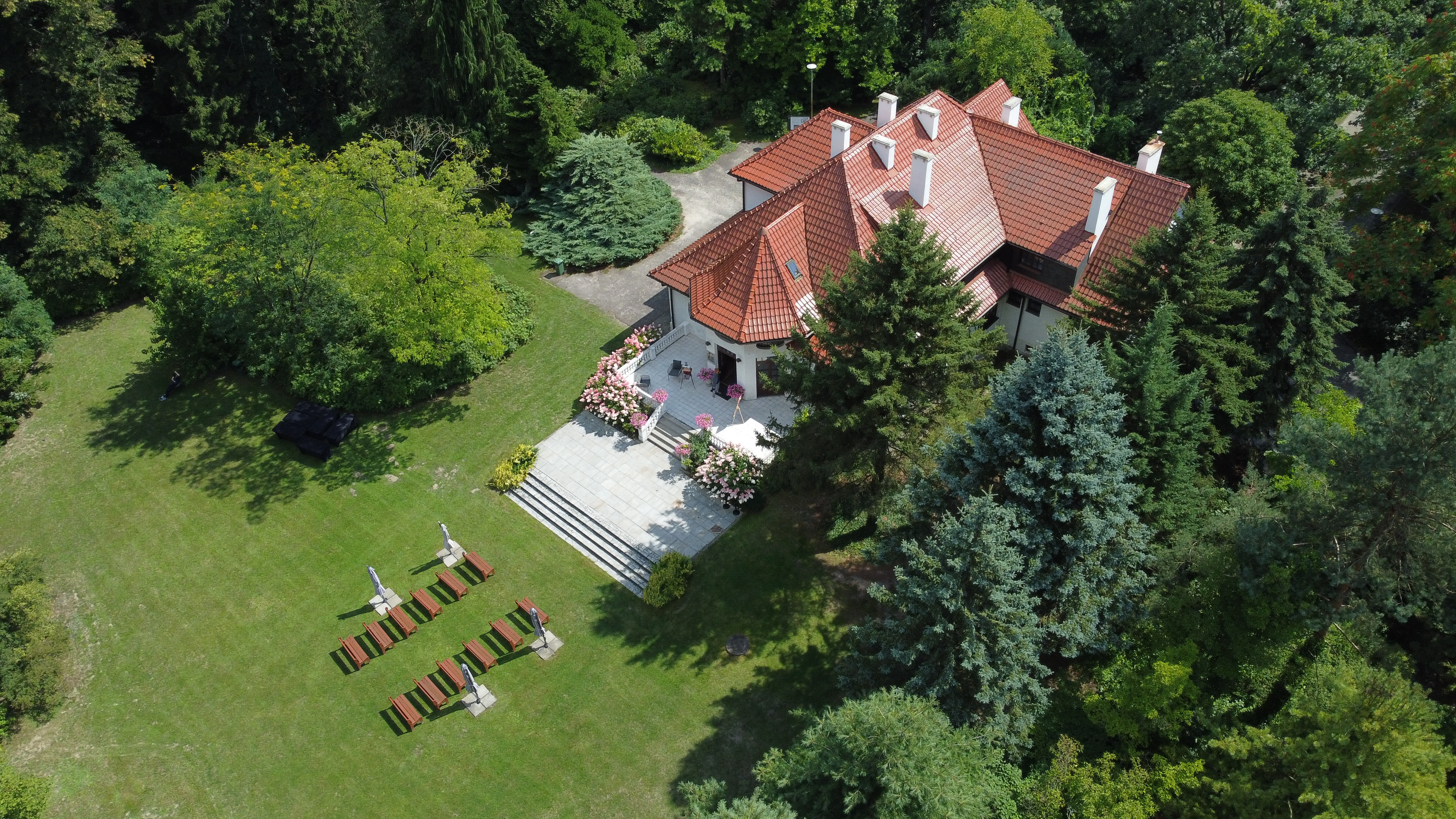
The Janówek Villa, a historical residence in Skarpa Powsińska, built in 1913.

In 1913, the Janówek Villa was constructed within thebcurrent Skarpa Powsińska, then part of the village of Klarysew. From 1928, it was the residence of the Fangor family. In 1943 artist Wojciech Fangor, created there a ceiling painting titled Pleiades, with mythological and astronomical motives.

By 1933, two villages were located within the area, Janówek and Łęczyca, which were part of the municipality of Jeziorna.

In 1938, the Polski Country Club bought a 50-hectare area in Skarpa Powsińska from count Adam Branicki to build a golf course. In the 1940s, while under the German occupation during the Second World War, it was turned into farmland. In 1947, the land was donated to the city of Warsaw, to establish a recreational area, which became the Powsin Culture Park. On 15 May 1951, the area was incorporated into Warsaw.

In 1974, the Polish Academy of Sciences Botanical Garden and Powsin Centre for Biological Diversity Conservation was established within Skarpa Powsińska, with an area of 40 ha. It was developed between 1978 and 1990, and also incorporated the Janówek Villa, and its gardens.

In 1996, the neighbourhood of Prawdziwka, was established in an area encompassing Łęczyca, between Prawdziwka Street, Muchomora Street, Kabaty Woods, and a field near them. It became a subdivision of the municipality of Warsaw-Ursynów, which was replaced by the city district of Ursynów in 2002. The neighbourhood status was reconfirmed in 2013. It is governed by an elected neighbourhood council. In 1998, Ursynów was subdivided into the areas of the City Information System, with Skarpa Powsińska becoming one of them.

== Characteristics ==
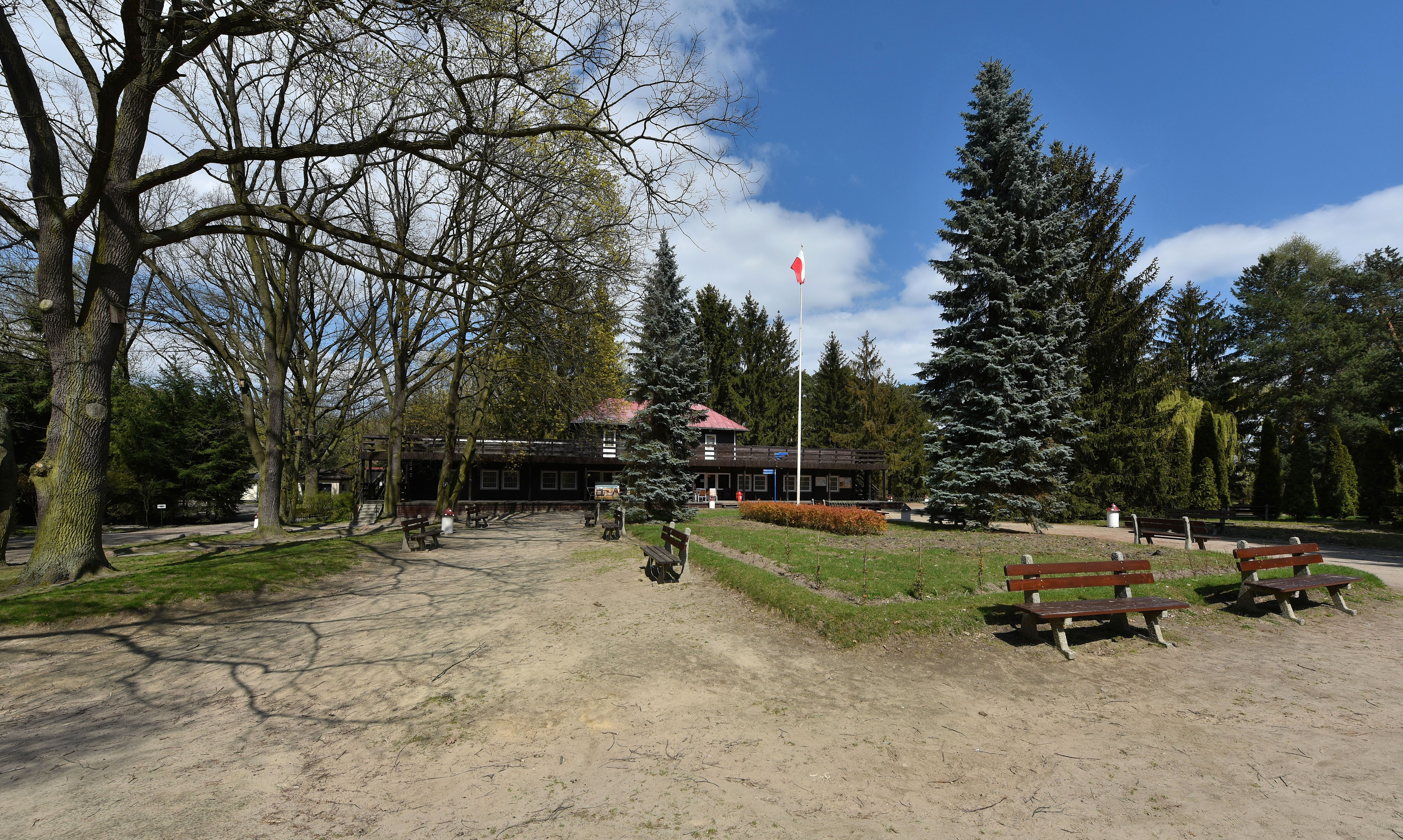
The Powsin Culture Park.

Skarpa Powsińska includes two small low-rose single-family neighbourhoods, Janówek and Łęczyca, located the southeast, at Prawdziwka Street. Łęczyca is encompassed within the municipal neighbourhood of Prawdziwka, administered by an elected neighbourhood council. It has the total area of 54 ha, and is located between Prawdziwka Street, Muchomora Street, Kabaty Woods, and field near them.

The area also features the Polish Academy of Sciences Botanical Garden and Powsin Centre for Biological Diversity Conservation at Polish Academy of Sciences Botanical Garden and Powsin Centre for Biological Diversity Conservation, which has an area of 40 ha, and includes over 10,000 species of plants in its collection, including numerous exotic and rare specimens. It is also a research facility of the Polish Academy of Sciences. Within its boundaries is also located the Janówek Villa, a historical 20th-century residence, which currently hosts plethora of cultural events, such as the Floralia Muzyczne classical music festival, organized by the Frédéric Chopin Society. The building also includes a 1943 ceiling painting with mythological and astronomical motives, titled Pleiades, by artist Wojciech Fangor, which has the protected status of cultural property.

Additionally, the Powsin Culture Park, a recreational and sports area, is also located at 1 Maślaków Street. Among its amenities are basketball and volleyball courts, swimming pool, and acoustical shell. It has an area of 35 ha.

== Location and boundaries ==
Skarpa Powsińska is a City Information System area of Warsaw, within the south-eastern portion of the Ursynów district. Its boundaries are determined by Kabaty Woods, Prawdziwka Street, and the border of the district of Ursynów. It borders Kabaty Woods Nature Reserve to the northwest, Powsin to the east, and the municipality of Konstancin-Jeziorna to the south. Its eastern boundary forms the border between districts of Ursynów and Wilanów, while its southern boundary forms the city border with the Piaseczno County.
