= Matka Koreanka (Wojciech Fangor) =

1951 Socialist Realist painting by Wojciech Fangor

- Artist: Wojciech Fangor
- Year: 1951
- Medium: Oil on canvas
- Dimensions: 150 cm × 200 cm (59 in × 79 in)
- Location: National Museum, Warsaw
- Accession: MPW 1777 MNW
- Website: https://cyfrowe.mnw.art.pl/pl/zbiory/449051

Matka Koreanka (English: Korean Mother) is a 1951 figurative oil painting on canvas by the Polish artist Wojciech Fangor. First exhibited in 1951, it is in the collection of the National Museum in Warsaw. The work is considered one of the most prominent examples of Socialist Realism in Poland.

== Analysis ==
=== Description ===
The work depicts a small Korean child crying over its mother's dead body, set against a desolate landscape of the Korean War. In the foreground, painted in earth tones and grays, the mother lies face-down in a pool of blood, her child of two or three climbing onto her back; mountains and the smoke of a burning village are visible behind. The composition is arranged as a triangle, with the near-life-size scale of the figures heightening the confrontation with the mother's lifeless body.

=== Interpretation and iconography ===
Completed in Stalinist Poland, and during the height of the Korean War, Fangor's painting has been read as a propagandistic indictment of American imperialism. The art historian Andrzej Szczerski situates the painting within the Polish nineteenth-century tradition of the Matka Polka (Polish Mother), a figure of the independence struggle who sheltered insurgents and sacrificed herself for her children. Szczerski argues that Fangor mapped the Korean War onto this national iconography, such that the image recalls Polish drawing of the 1860s and the tragedy of the January Uprising, particularly Artur Grottger's cycle Wojna (1866–67). Fangor himself later described the work as painted in a nineteenth-century style.

Fangor's Matka Koreanka was awarded second prize in painting at the II Nationwide Exhibition of Polish Visual Art (II Ogólnopolska Wystawa Plastyki) at Zachęta – National Gallery of Art in 1951, the annual display of Polish Socialist Realist art. In his review of the show, and writing under Stalinist censorship, Juliusz Starzyński judged Fangor almost the only Polish painter to give the "struggle for peace" theme full dramatic expression, while questioning his decision to forgo color in favor of a grey, oppressive monochrome. Discussing the work in 1994, Fangor characterized his turn to Socialist Realism and propaganda as a singular aberration in his career, resting on a naïve assumption of innate human goodness he traced to Rousseau, and said the experience left him permanently wary of social experiments aimed at redeeming humanity.
