= Stanisław Zamecznik =

Polish graphic artist, poster artist, scenographer and architect

- Born: 10 March 1909; Warsaw, Vistula Land,
- Died: 2 May 1971 (aged 62); Warsaw, Polish People's Republic
- Known for: Graphic art Exhibition design Architecture

Stanisław Zamecznik (10 March 1909 – 2 May 1971) was a Polish graphic artist, poster artist, scenographer and architect. Zamecznik was a professor of State Higher School of Fine Arts, Poznań (now Academy of Fine Arts). He was a cousin of Wojciech Zamecznik, a graphic artist, interior decorator and photographer.

== Biography ==
Zamecznik was born in Warsaw. He was co-author of the innovative composition Węgiel at the exhibition in Wrocław (with Wojciech Zamecznik; 1948). He designed numerous of international exhibitions, Wojciech Fangor painting exhibition in an environmental style in the Jewish Theatre in Warsaw (1958), Henry Moore sculpture exhibitions in Warsaw (1959), exhibitions in the National Museum in Warsaw and permanent exhibitions in the Historical Museum in Warsaw. Zamecznik co-designed enlargement of the Zachęta edifice.

He was awarded 1st prize of the Ministry of Culture and Art. Zamecznik's first and only individual exhibition was held posthumously in 1972 in Warsaw, where he died.

== General references ==
- "Zamecznik Stanisław". Internetowa encyklopedia PWN (in Polish). Wydawnictwo Naukowe PWN.
- "Zamecznik Stanisław". Interia.pl Encyclopedia (in Polish).
