= Wojciech Zamecznik =

Polish graphic artist, architect, photographer and interior designer

- Born: 13 January 1923; Warsaw, Second Polish Republic
- Died: 12 May 1967 (aged 44); Warsaw, Polish People’s Republic
- Known for: Graphic art Architecture; Photography; Interior design

Wojciech Zamecznik (13 January 1923 in Warsaw – 12 May 1967 in Warsaw) was a Polish graphic artist, architect, photographer and interior designer.

Zamecznik's most notable works are movie and socio-political posters. He created his own, ascetic poster style which was derived from traditional forms of constructivism and Bauhaus. He was also an author of book graphics and magazine designs. He designed also some remarkable record covers for the label Polskie Nagrania Muza

He was the cousin of Stanisław Zamecznik, graphic artist, poster artist, scenographer and architect.

== Bibliography ==
- Wojciech Zamecznik. Photo-graphics, edited by Karolina Puchala-Rojek and Karolina Ziebinska-Lewandowska, Fundacja Archeologia Fotografii, Warsaw 2015
- Wojciech Zamecznik. Photography in all its forms, edited by Anne Lacoste, Collection Musée de l’Elysée n°3, Lausanne, Editions Noir sur Blanc, 2016
- Wojciech Zamecznik NOW!, edited by Karolina Lewandowska, text by Karol Sienkiewicz, Fundacja Archeologia Fotografii, Warsaw 2012
- Wojciech Zamecznik 1923-1967, edited by Janina Fijalkowska, National Museum in Warsaw, Warsaw 1968
