= Łęczyca, Warsaw =

Neighbourhood in Warsaw, Poland

Łęczyca
- Municipal neighbourhood
- Prawdziwka
- Interactive map of Łęczyca
- Coordinates: 52°06′13″N 21°05′15″E
- Country: Poland
- Voivodeship: Masovian
- City and county: Warsaw
- District: Ursynów
- City Information System area: Skarpa Powsińska

Area
  - Total: 0.54 km^{2} (0.21 sq mi)
- Time zone: UTC+1 (CET)
  - Summer (DST): UTC+2 (CEST)
- Area code: +48 22

Łęczyca (Polish: [wɛnˈt͡ʂɘ̟.t͡sa]) is a neighbourhood in Warsaw, Poland, located within the district of Ursynów, within the City Information System area of Skarpa Powsińska. It is a small single-family housing neighbourhood, centred of Prawdziwka Street. It forms the municipal neighbourhood of Prawdziwka (Polish: [pravˈd͡ʑiv.ka]).

== History ==
By 1933, Łęczyca was a village within the municipality of Jeziorna. On 15 May 1951, it was incorporated into the city of Warsaw.

In 1974, to its east was established the Polish Academy of Sciences Botanical Garden – Powsin Centre for Biological Diversity Conservation, with an area of 40 ha. It was developed between 1978 and 1990.

In 1996 was established the municipal neighbourhood of Prawdziwka, located between Prawdziwka Street, Muchomora Street, Kabaty Woods, and field near them, which included Łęczyca. It became a subdivision of the municipality of Warsaw-Ursynów, which was replaced by the city district of Ursynów in 2002. The neighbourhood status was reconfirmed in 2013. It is governed by an elected neighbourhood council.

== Characteristics ==
Łęczyca is a small single-family neighbourhood, located between Prawdziwka Street and Muchomora Street. It forms the municipal neighbourhood of Prawdziwka, with boundaries determined by Prawdziwka Street, Muchomora Street, Kabaty Woods, and field near them. It has the total area of 54 ha. It is governed by an elected neighbourhood council

To its east, at 2 Prawdziwka Street is located the Polish Academy of Sciences Botanical Garden – Powsin Centre for Biological Diversity Conservation, which has an area of 40 ha, and includes over 10,000 species of plants in its collection, including numerous exotic and rare examples. It is also a research facility of the Polish Academy of Sciences.
