= Magdalena Wiecek =

Polish sculptor (1924–2008)

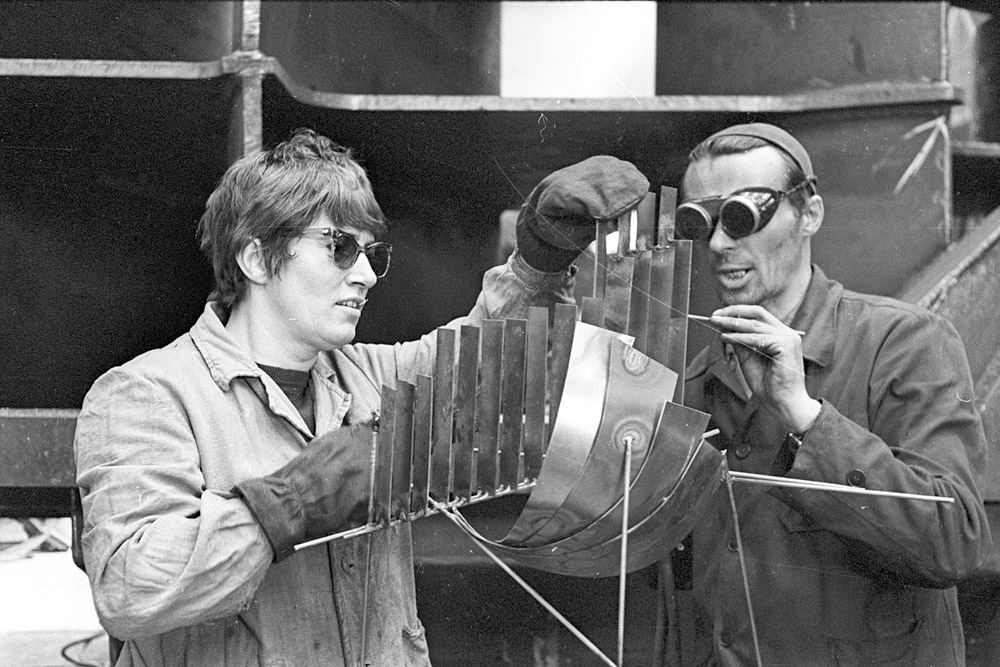
- Magdalena Więcek working on a sculpture, the 2nd Biennale of Spatial Forms in Elbląg, 1967
- Born: July 23, 1924
- Died: December 31, 2008 (aged 84)
- Education: The State School of Visual Arts
- Style: Abstract sculpture

Magdalena Więcek (July 23, 1924 in Katowice, Poland - December 31, 2008 in Dahab, Egypt) was a Polish sculptor and art teacher.

== Biography ==
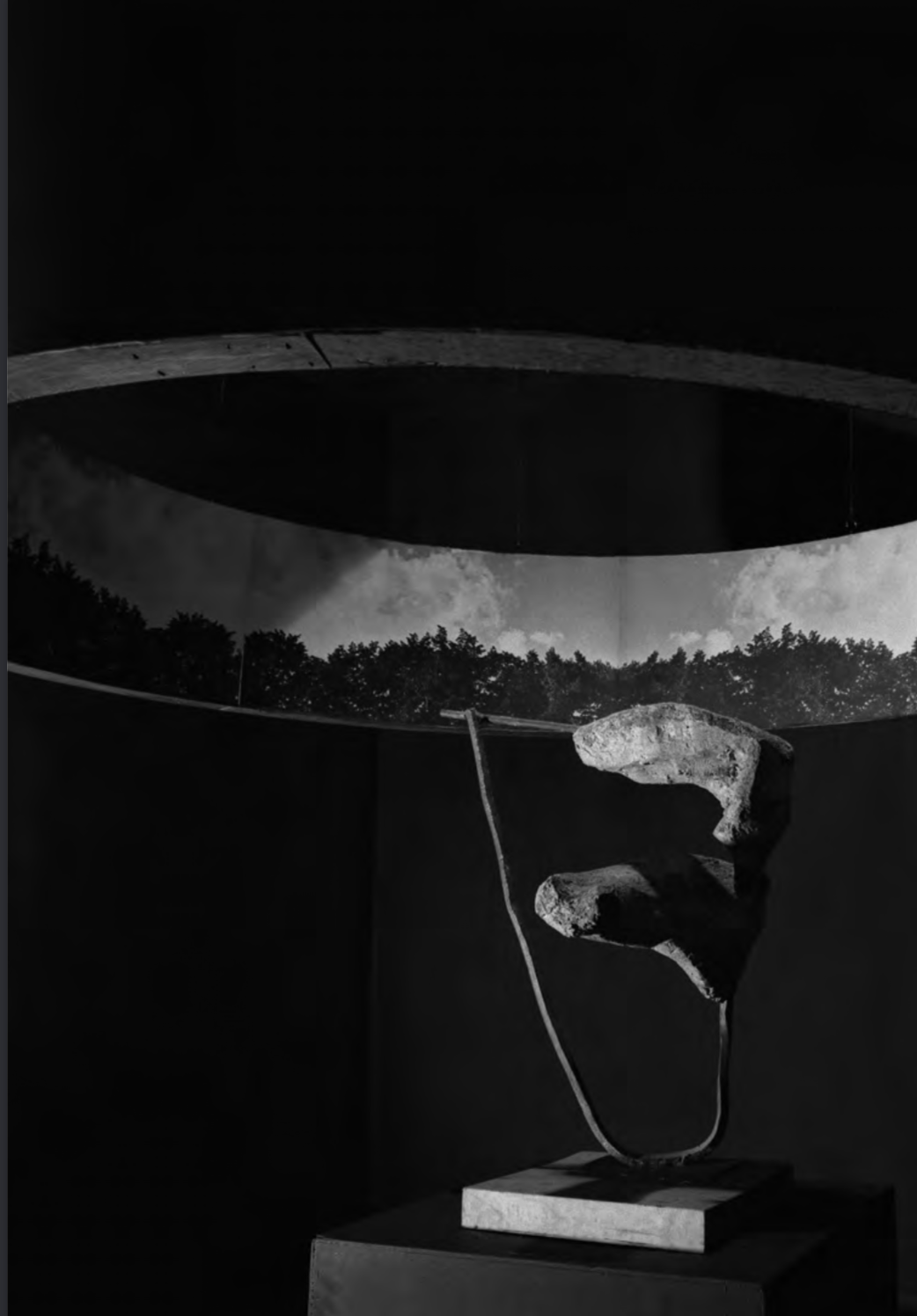
Magdalena Więcek, Florale, 1959, installation, cement, metal, photography, wood

Magdalena Wiecek was born in Katowice, a daughter of Karol, a steel worker and Gertruda, a seamstress. In 1945, she moved to a coastal town Sopot to study painting at The State School of Visual Arts, where she met her future husband, Marian Wnuk. In 1949, Więcek moved to Warsaw to study sculpture at The Academy of Fine Arts under professors Marian Wnuk and Franciszek Strynkiewicz. She graduated in 1952 and debuted the same year with a socialist-realist sculpture entitled Miners at the National Exhibit of Fine Arts in Zachęta. In 1955, Więcek married Marian Wnuk and gave birth to her only child, Daniel Wnuk. At the time Wiecek worked out of her studio in the post industrial and old Jewish neighborhood Wola, at Zelazna Street. In the early 1950s, Więcek began her life time engagement with artist residences at steel mills, stone quarries and studio visits; and, collaborations with various architects and designers. She exhibited internationally. She traveled and maintained professional relationships with artists from France, Germany, the Netherlands, England, Belgium, and Austria. She was a member of the Association of Polish Artists and Designers and Association Internationale des Arts Plastiques. In 1966 Więcek started a teaching position at the State School of Fine Arts in Poznań, where she continued teaching art for sixteen years. In 1983-1984 she was a visiting professor at the Koninklijke Academie van Beeldende Kunsten’s Gravenhage in the Netherlands. In the late 1980s, she traveled to New York and worked out of her Brooklyn studio. Between 1994 and 2000 she lived and worked in Berlin. She was artistically close to the Centre of Polish Sculpture in Orońsko, where she produced and exhibited many of her works. She won numerous awards, including the Grand Prix Internazionale de la Contemporanea d’ Art Principauté de Monaco. Her works can be seen at the National Museum in Warsaw, Museum of Art in Łódź, National Museum in Poznań and Kröller-Müller Museum in Otterlo. She died in 2008 during a family vacation in Egypt. She was married to Marian Wnuk, sculptor and President of The Academy of Fine Arts in Warsaw.

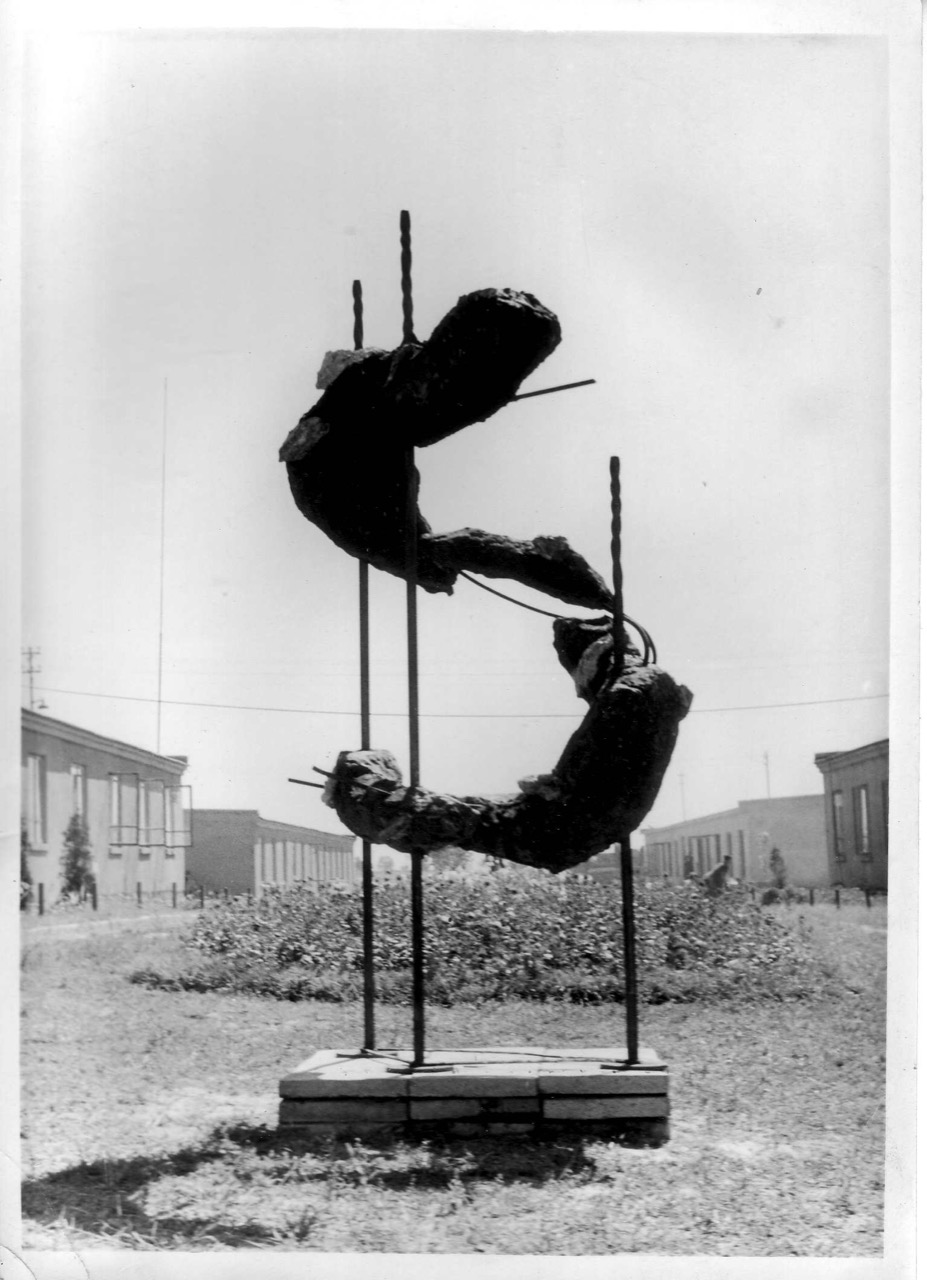
Magdalena Więcek, S Symbol of Sulfur, 1962, concrete, steel, 300 cm

== Artistic output ==
=== Figurative sculpture ===
Magdalena Więcek’s creative beginnings coincided with the socialist-realist period, which determined themes and forms created by artists. First known artworks of Więcek were figurative sculptures made of plaster and stone – Miners (1953) and the Polish-Soviet Friendship Memorial / Youth (1954). They were massive and heavy and their dynamic texture resembled the opus of Xawery Dunikowski. In 1955, Więcek took part in Against War, Against Fascism exhibition at Arsenal Gallery. The new, expressive style was presented in her award-winning work The Mother, showing a naked, kneeling woman with a child by her knees and her right arm raised in a gesture of protest.

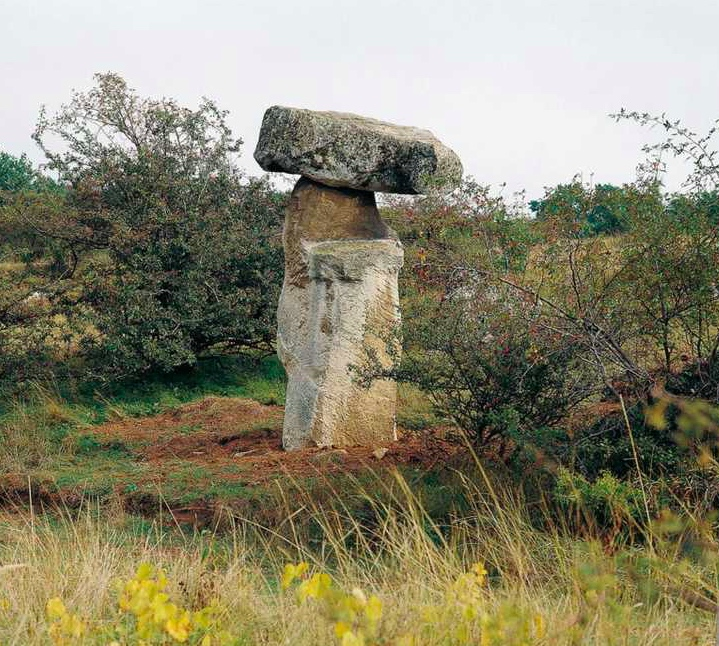
Magdalena Więcek, untitled, 1964

=== Krzywe koło ===
In the late 1950s Więcek became well acquainted with artists and intellectuals frequenting the Krzywe Koło Club in Warsaw. In 1958, an exhibition featuring works by Magdalena Więcek, Stefan Gierowski and Marian Bogusz (with whom the artist would later collaborate on multiple occasions) took place at the Krzywe Koło Gallery. Więcek’s deformed sculptures were on display there, which was a milestone in her creative development.

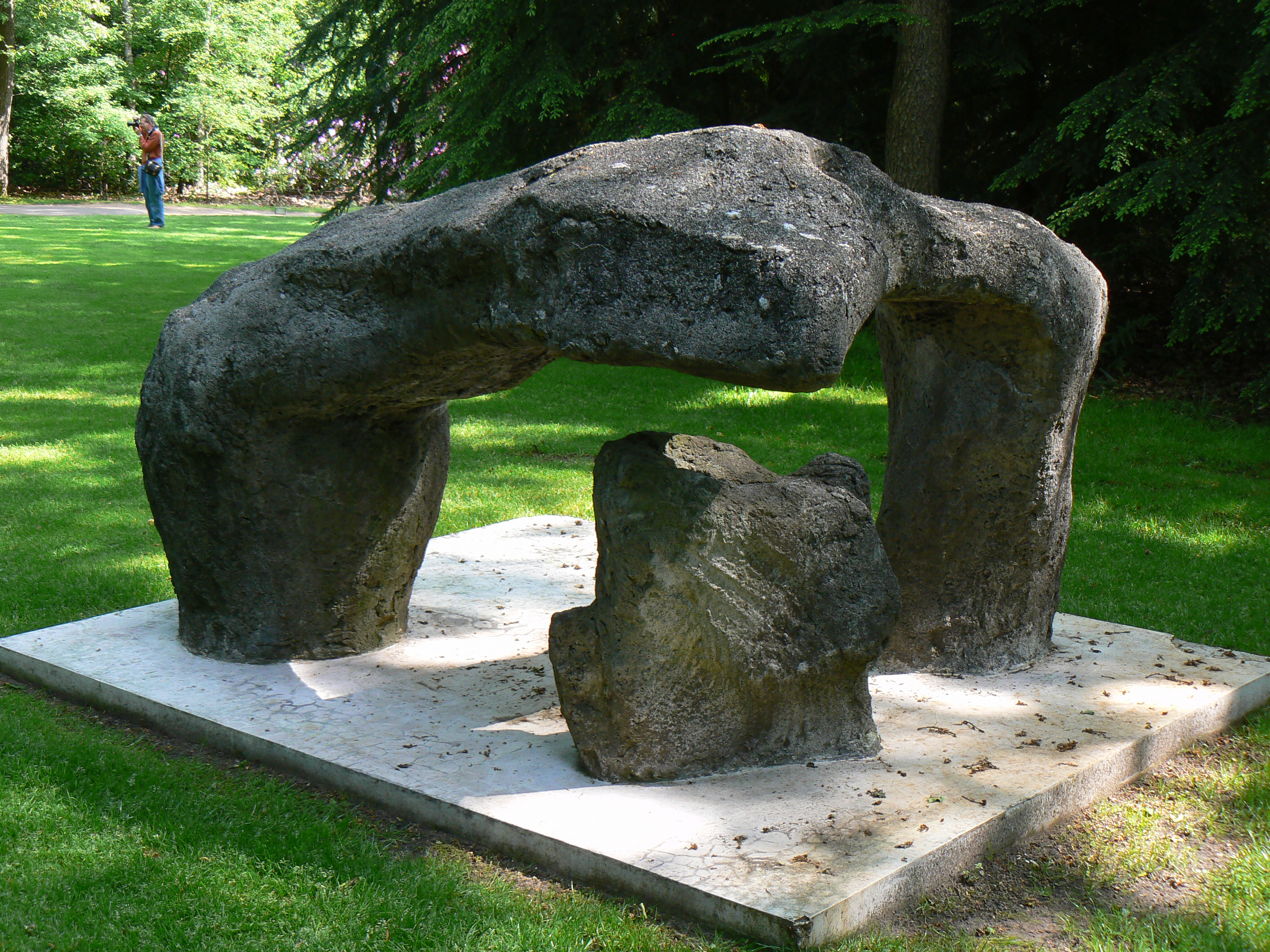
sculpture Close to the earth (1968) by Magdalena Wiecek in KMM Sculpturepark/The Netherlands

=== Organic sculpture ===
By the end of the 1950s, the artist experimented with concrete and created organic forms, which were abstract but also reminiscent of deformed body parts or prehistoric, primitive obelisks. They were coherent with the avant-garde of the time. At the break of the 1950s and 1960s, Florale and Close to the Earth were created. Their organic forms levitated above the ground on cast-iron rods, losing their massiveness and connection with the basis. In 1963, Więcek was invited by Karl Prant to a symposium in St. Margarethen, Austria, for which she created a large-scale sculpture made of almost completely rough blocks of stone.

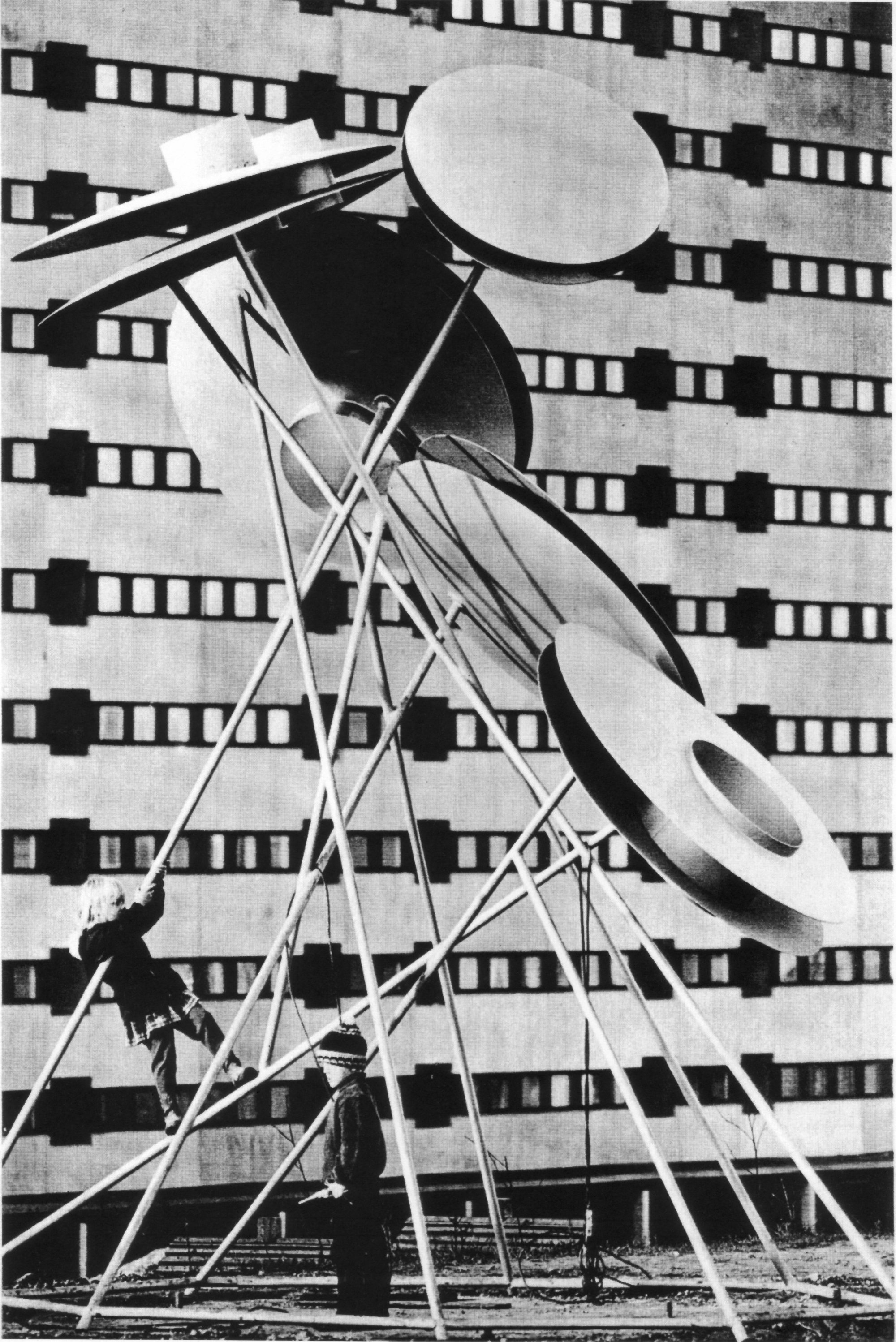
Magdalena Więcek, Volatile, 1967, steel, 410 cm, Aalborg

=== Biennale of Spatial Forms ===
In 1965 and 1967 Więcek engaged in work around Biennale of Spatial Forms in Elbląg with Gerard Kwiatkowski and Marian Bogusz. During the first Biennale, the artist created a large-scale abstract form titled Disconnection – Structure. The dynamic form of the sculpture created an impression as if disconnected elements were revolving in the air around the construction, attracted by its centrifugal force. For the next edition, Więcek prepared Upward Flight – Spatial Composition, in which the geometry of a flying ball was studied, with two spherical forms hanged on metal scaffolding.

=== Volatile series ===
That interest in movement and flight continued to express itself in the series of small brass sculptures called Volatile, which were created around 1970. They were built of spherical forms, circles, disks, and hemispheres, which evoked associations with cosmos and microchemistry[6].

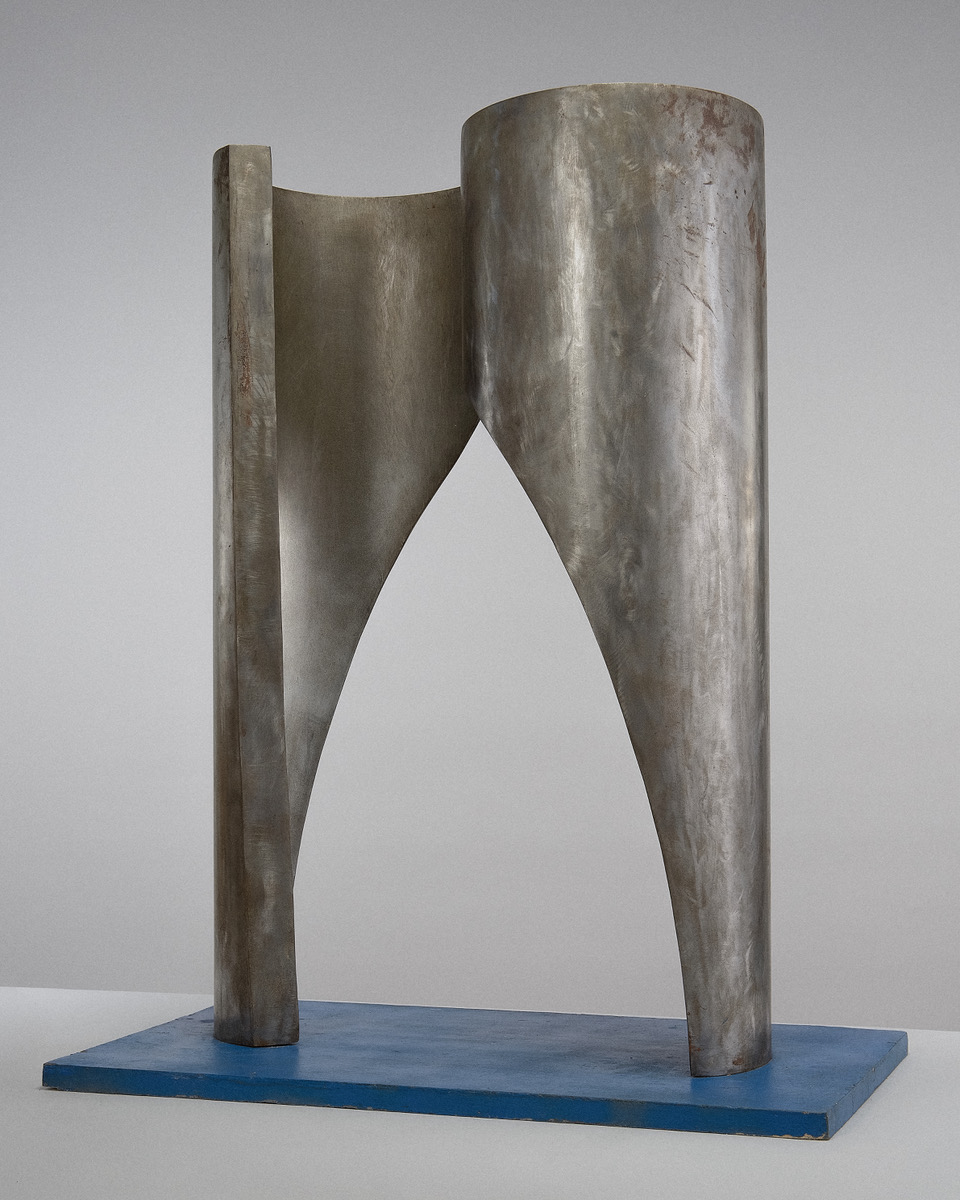
Magdalena Więcek, Sacrum IV, 1972, steel, 100 × 65 × 32 cm

=== Outdoor projects ===
After Biennale of Spatial Forms, in the 1970s, Więcek created many large, abstract outdoor sculptures, often corresponding with the surrounding architecture. For example, the unrealized project of sculpture within the Warsaw Eastern Wall (designed by Zbigniew Karpiński). The Volatile sculpture in Aalborg, Denmark, and Bloom, both from 1976, are outdoor sculptures made with metal elements welded into a light, dynamic structure. It refers to the work of American sculptor Richard Serra.

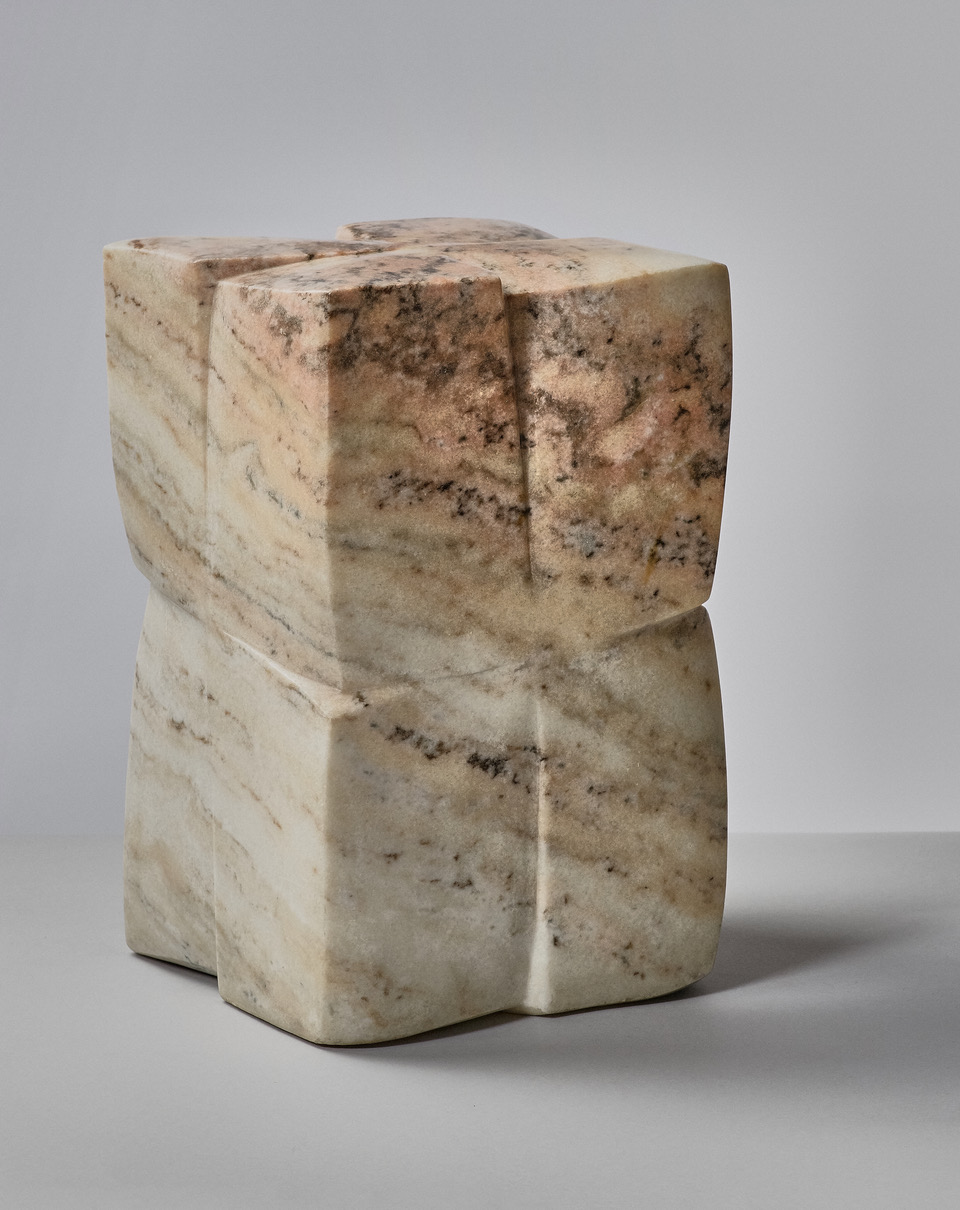
Magdalena Więcek, Dialogue with a Stone (XII), 1985, marble, 40 × 24 × 25 cm

=== Dialogues with a Stone ===
Another breakthrough in Więcek’s artistic work was marked by the cycle of Dialogues with a Stone, created between the late 1970s and mid-1990s. The sculptures included in this cycle were all close to organic, abstract forms, featuring mixes of colored marble and granite, ovoid shapes, smooth and haptic surfaces.

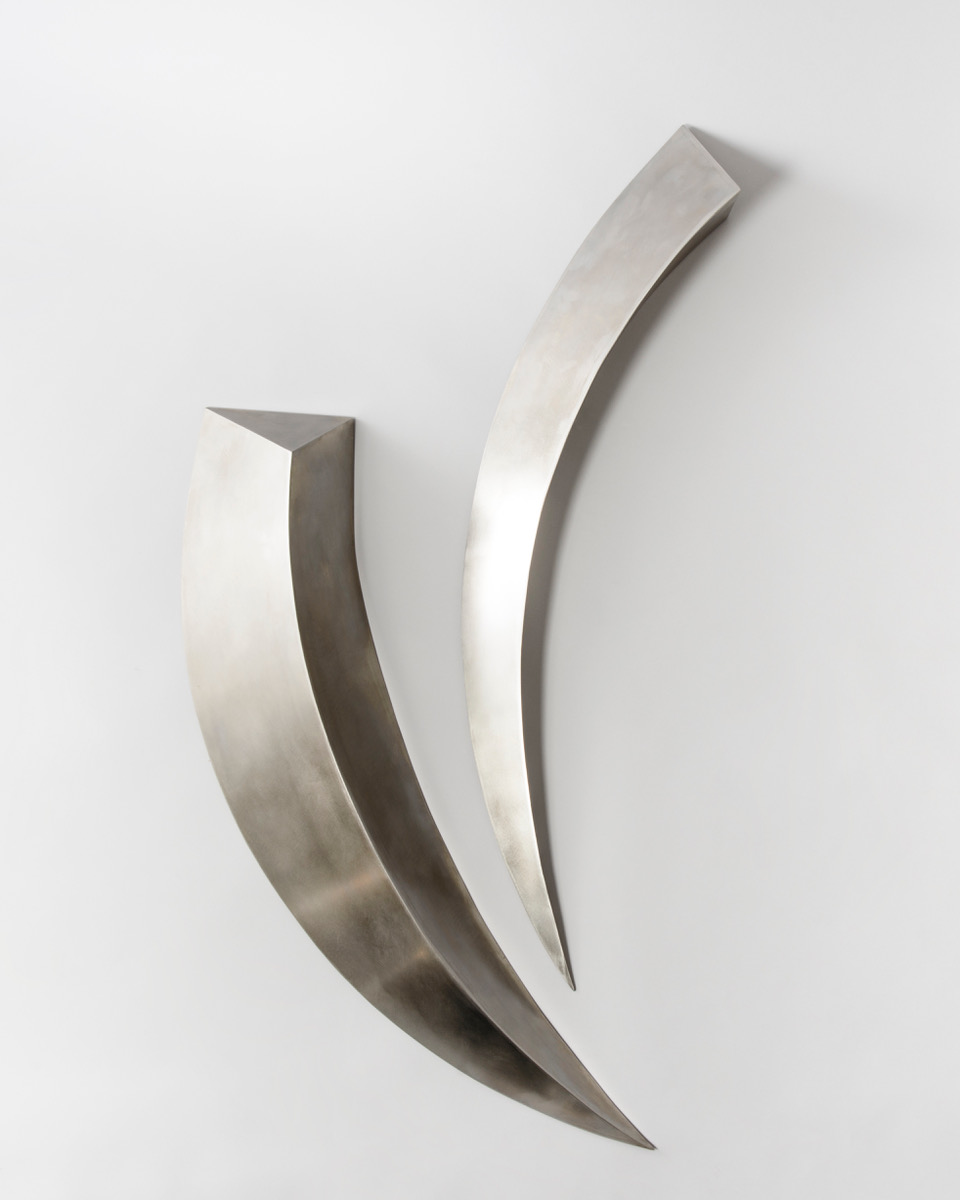
Magdalena Więcek, Bass Relief III, 2007, steel, 80 × 70 × 10 cm

=== Late work ===
Magdalena Więcek was active in sculpture and drawing until her death. In the 1990s and after 2000, she created numerous steel reliefs, such as „Relief-Bass”. The oeuvre of Magdalena Więcek consistently shows art as an important and autonomous form of human expression. Więcek is looking for universal value through research, creation, and transformation of reality.

== Selected exhibitions ==
- 1958/1959 – Magdalena Więcek, Marian Bogusz, Stefan Gierowski, Krzywe Koło Gallery, Warsaw
- 1959 – participation (along with Teresa Pągowska, Jan Lebestein and Alina Szapocznikow) in Premiere Biennale de Paris. Manifestation Biennale et Internationale de Jeunes Artistes
- 1960 – Magdalena Więcek, Krzywe Koło Gallery, Warsaw
- 1961 – Magdalena Więcek, Graphil Galerie, Amsterdam
- 1963 – Confrontatie 3, Pinkegalerij, Giessenburg
- 1968 – Magdalena Więcek, sculpture and drawing, Współczesna gallery, Warsaw
- 1970 – Magdalena Więcek, Sculpture. Stefan Gierowski. Painting. Sculpture. Light, Colour, Współczesna gallery, Warsaw
- 1974 – Magdalena Więcek, Sculptures and Drawings, National Museum, Poznań
- 1975 – Magdalena Więcek, Stadlische Theater, Dortmund
- 1977 – Magdalena Więcek, Galeria Zapiecek, Warszawa
- 1978 – Magdalena Więcek. Sculpture. Stefan Gierowski. Painting, Zapiecek gallery, Warszawa
- 1979 – Magdalena Więcek, Sculpture, Zapiecek gallery, Warsaw
- 1986 – Magdalena Więcek, Sculptures, Singer Museum, Laren
- 1987 – Magdalena Więcek, Compositions [Retrovisions of my stones], Zapiecek gallery, Warsaw
- 1990 – Kreuzdarstellungen. Der Weg Jesu in Bildern von Magdalena Więcek, Evangelische Kirchengemeinde, Offenbach- Bieber
- 1992 – Magdalena Więcek. Skulpturen, Zeichungen, Bilder, Galerie im Kreishaus, Hofheim am Taunus
- 1993 – Magdalena Więcek, Sculpture, The Centre of Polish Sculpture, Orońsko
- 1996 – Magdalena Więcek. Sculpture and Drawing, Kordegarda Gallery, Warsaw
- 2007 – Magdalena Więcek. Sculpture, Zapiecek Gallery
- 2013/2014 – Magdalena Więcek, Retrospective, The Centre of Polish Sculpture, Orońsko
- 2016 – Magdalena Więcek, Affecting the Eye, Zachęta – National Gallery of Art, Warsaw • 2018 – Magdalena Więcek and Natalia Załuska, PAS DE DEUX, Christine König 2018 Galerie, Vienna • 2019 – Magdalena Więcek, Glin, Olszewski Gallery, Warsaw

== Recent group shows ==
- The Other Transatlantic Theorizing - kinetic & op art in Central, Eastern Europe & South America, 2016 MSN, Warsaw - 2018 GARAGE, Moscow - 2018 SESC, São Paulo
- 2019 - Henry Moore – Power of Nature, The Center of Polish Sculpture, Oronsko, Poland
- 2019 - OBJECT – SPACE, The National Museum in Poznań
- 2020 - Dimensions of Reality Female Minimal, GALERIE THADDAEUS ROPAC, Paris Pantin
