= Marian Czapla =

Polish artist (1946–2016)

Marian Czapla (28 July 1946 – 12 January 2016) was a Polish painter and graphic artist.

Born on 28 July 1946 in Gacki near Szydłów, Czapla graduated from the School of Plastic Arts in Kielce. He then attended the Academy of Fine Arts in Warsaw and was a pupil of Stefan Gierowski (painting), Halina Chrostowska, and Joseph Pakulski (graphics).

Czapla co-founded the art group Simplex S4, of which he was a member from 1974 to 1979. Since 1972 he has been a professor of painting at his former university. His works have been displayed at many solo exhibitions and group exhibitions in Poland and abroad. The National Museum in Kielce held an exhibition from May 24 to July 28, 2002, which featured 155 pieces from three decades of Czapla's work.

He lived in Warsaw, and after 1979 was an Honorary Citizen of the municipality of Szydłów. He died on 12 January 2016, at the age of 69.

== Sources ==
- Marian Czapla. W 30-lecie pracy twórczej. – culture.pl
- Mirosław Karcz; Stefan Gierowski; Ewa Wolak; Biuro Wystaw Artystycznych (1991). Malarstwo: Marian Czapla (in Polish). Legnica: Galeria Sztuki Współczesnej BWA Legnica.
- Marian Czapla (c. 1996). Marian Czapla:Ecce Homo (in Polish). Gorzów Wielkopolski: Biuro Wystaw Artystychnych. p. 36. ISBN 978-83-905849-4-2.
- Okła, Grażyna (2002). Mała Ojczyzna Świętokrzyskie Dziedzictwo kulturowe (in Polish). p. 267. ISBN 83-88710-43-5.
- Refleksje z życia (in Polish). Krosno: Wola Sękowa. 2002. p. 216. ISBN 978-83-89123-22-0.
- Iwona Rajkowska (2002). Marian Czapla : w 30-lecie pracy twórczej : wystawa przygotowana przez Muzeum Narodowe w Kielcach (in Polish). Kielce and Warsaw: FPSN. p. 155. ISBN 978-83-916987-0-9.
- Marian Czapla: Malarstwo (in Polish). Warsaw: Academy of Fine Arts in Warsaw. 2009. p. 128. ISBN 978-83-61558-16-3.
