= Powsin Culture Park =

Urban park in Warsaw, Poland

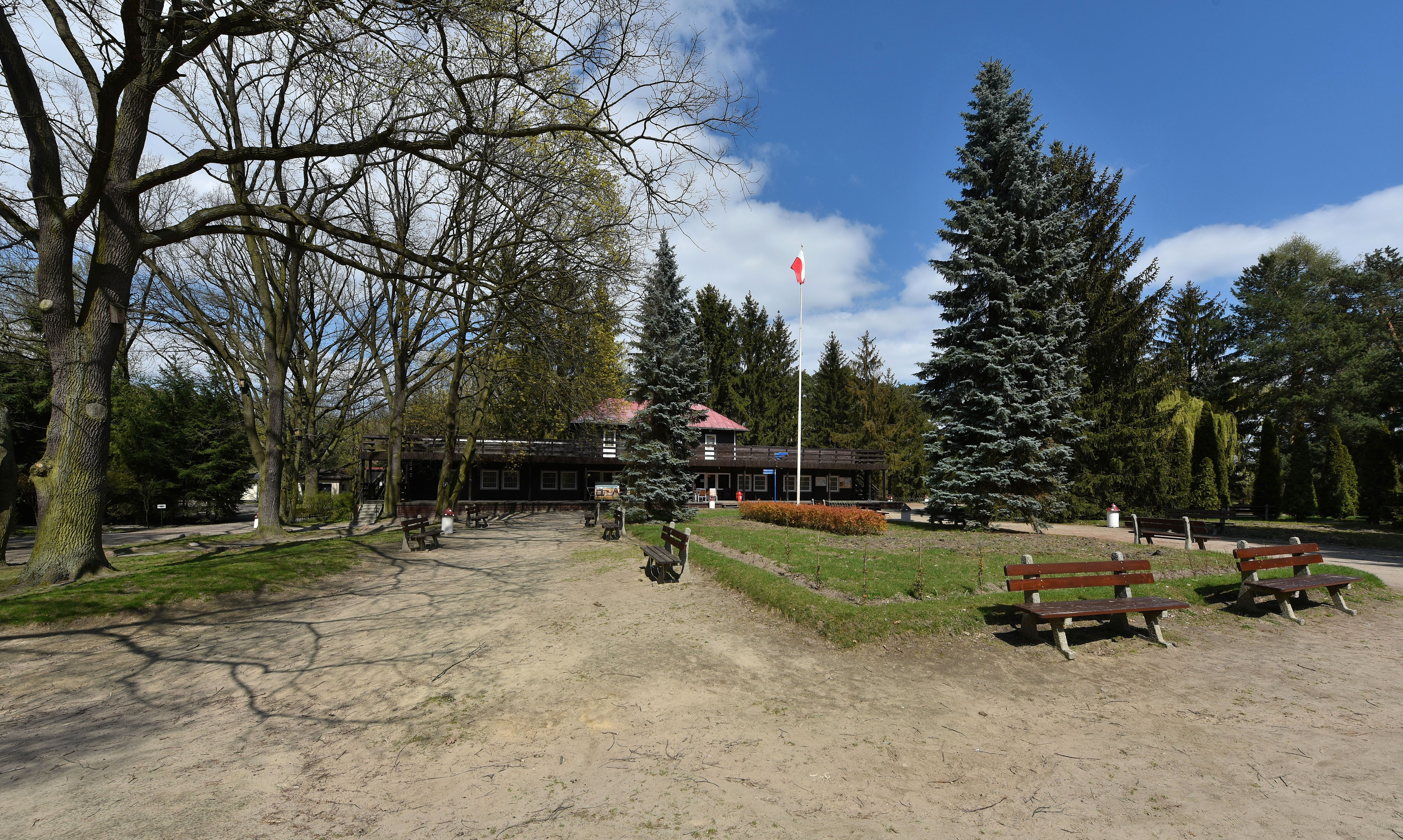
- The Powsin Culture Park in 2017.
- Interactive map of Powsin Culture Park
- Type: Urban park
- Location: Ursynów, Warsaw, Poland
- Coordinates: 52°06′58″N 21°05′29″E
- Area: 35 hectares (86 acres)
- Created: 1947

The Powsin Culture Park (Polish pronunciation: [ˈpɔf.ɕin]; Polish: Park Kultury w Powsinie) is an urban park in Warsaw, Poland, within the district of Ursynów, at 1 Maślaków Street. It is a recreational area, containing numerous sports and cultural amenities. The park was established in 1947.

== History ==
In 1938, the Polski Country Club bought a 50-hectare area in Skarpa Powsińska from count Adam Branicki to build golf course. In the 1940s, during the occupation of Poland in the Second World War, it was turned into a farmland. In 1947, the land was donated to the city of Warsaw, for it to establish there a recreational area, named the Powsin Holiday Resort (Polish: Ośrodek Wczasów Świątecznych w Powsinie). In 1956, it was renamed to the Powsin Culture Park.

== Characteristics ==
The Powsin Culture Park is located in the neighbourhood of Skarpa Powsińska, within the district of Ursynów, and near the border of Wilanów, at 1 Maślaków Street. It borders the Kabaty Woods and the Polish Academy of Sciences Botanical Garden – Powsin Centre for Biological Diversity Conservation. The park has the total area of 35 ha.

It is a recreational area with many sports and cultural amenities, including basketball and volleyball courts, swimmingpool, acoustical shell, and camping huts.

There grows a 24-metre-tall pedunculate oak tree, nicknamed Hetman, with the status of the natural monument.
