= Stefan Gierowski =

Polish artist (1925–2022)

Stefan Gierowski (21 May 1925 – 14 August 2022) was a Polish painter and an avant garde artist of post-war Poland.

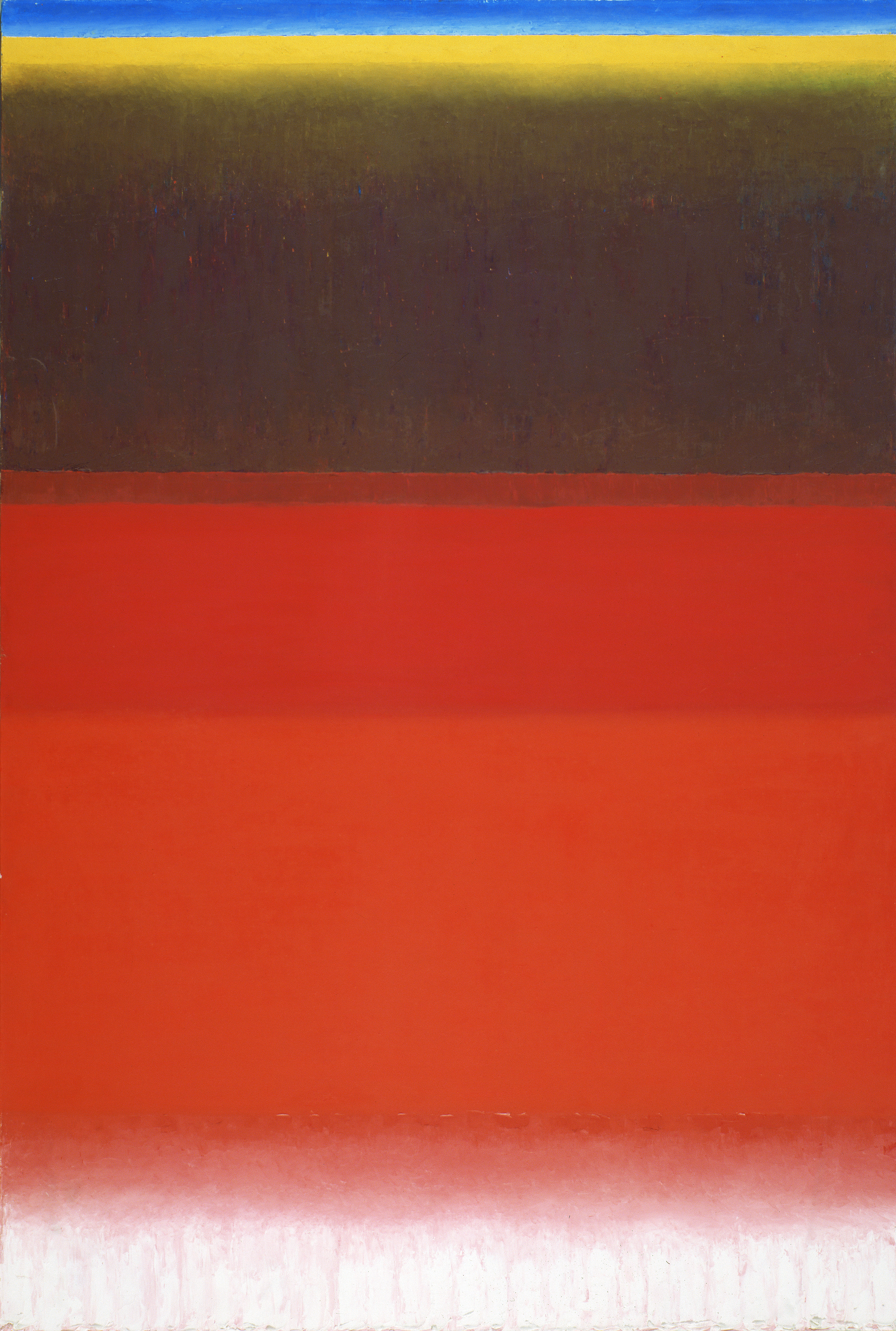
Stefan Gierowski, Painting DCIII, 1990

For many years he was a professor at the Academy of Fine Arts in Warsaw where he earned numerous distinctions. He abandoned representational and realist painting midway through the 1950s and devoted himself entirely to abstract and optical effects. Acknowledging the concreteness of materials and colors, the artist, by his own admission, is mostly intrigued by the dual nature of light, how light is enclosed within a painting and yet somehow escapes it. According to the artist, each painting has a structure and a framework based on physical laws until it leaves the studio and becomes an enigma, at the disposition of the viewer, who discerns its content through a combination of emotional response and introspection. His paintings hang in major galleries in Europe, the United States and many other countries throughout the world.

== Early years ==
Stefan Gierowski was born on 21 May 1925 in Częstochowa, but grew up in Kielce, where soon after his birth the Gierowski family moved. He came from a family of intellectuals, his father, Joseph Gierowski, was a doctor whose passion for painting played an important role in cultivating his son's artistic talent. Artistic traditions in the family were also strongly present thanks to the figure of Antoni Gierowski, Józef's uncle, who was a nineteenth-century painter and drawer. Patriotic traditions were equally important for the education of the young artist. From an early age, he showed interest in painting and a desire to perfect himself in it. After the outbreak of the Second World War, Stefan Gierowski together with his mother Stefania joined the Union of Armed Struggle (Polish: Związek Walki Zbrojnej, ZWZ), and later the Home Army (Polish: Armia Krajowa, AK) and actively participated in underground activities under the pseudonym "Hubert". In 1941, at the age of 16, he began underground artistic education under the supervision of Andrzej Oleś, a well-known Kielce watercolourist, which he was forced to interrupt in 1944 because of his relocation to the Częstochowa Inspectorate.

== Study period ==
After the dissolution of the Home Army, Gierowski moved to Cracow, where he began parallel studies at the Academy of Fine Arts and the Faculty of Art History at the Jagiellonian University. The experience of studying art history proved to be crucial for young Gierowski in broadening his thinking about painting and art, thereby opening him to modernity. Under the supervision of Wojsław Mole, he wrote a seminar paper entitled "Impressionism as part of French culture". Initially, the artist studied at the school of Prof. Władysław Jarocki, but after passing the clandestine classes conducted by Oleś, he was transferred to the third year. He studied in the atelier of Zbigniew Pronaszko, a former formist, as well as Karol Frycz, where he studied painting in architecture and created stage designs. Classes and conversations with Frycz familiarised Gierowski with the art of Young Poland. He also met Jerzy Panek, Zbigniew Grzybowski, Stanisław Wójcik and Andrzej Wróblewski in his studio and at university. During his studies, he established cooperation with the social and literary weekly magazine "Wieś", publishing an article on modern art, as well as illustrating subsequent issues.

=== Activity in the artistic community ===
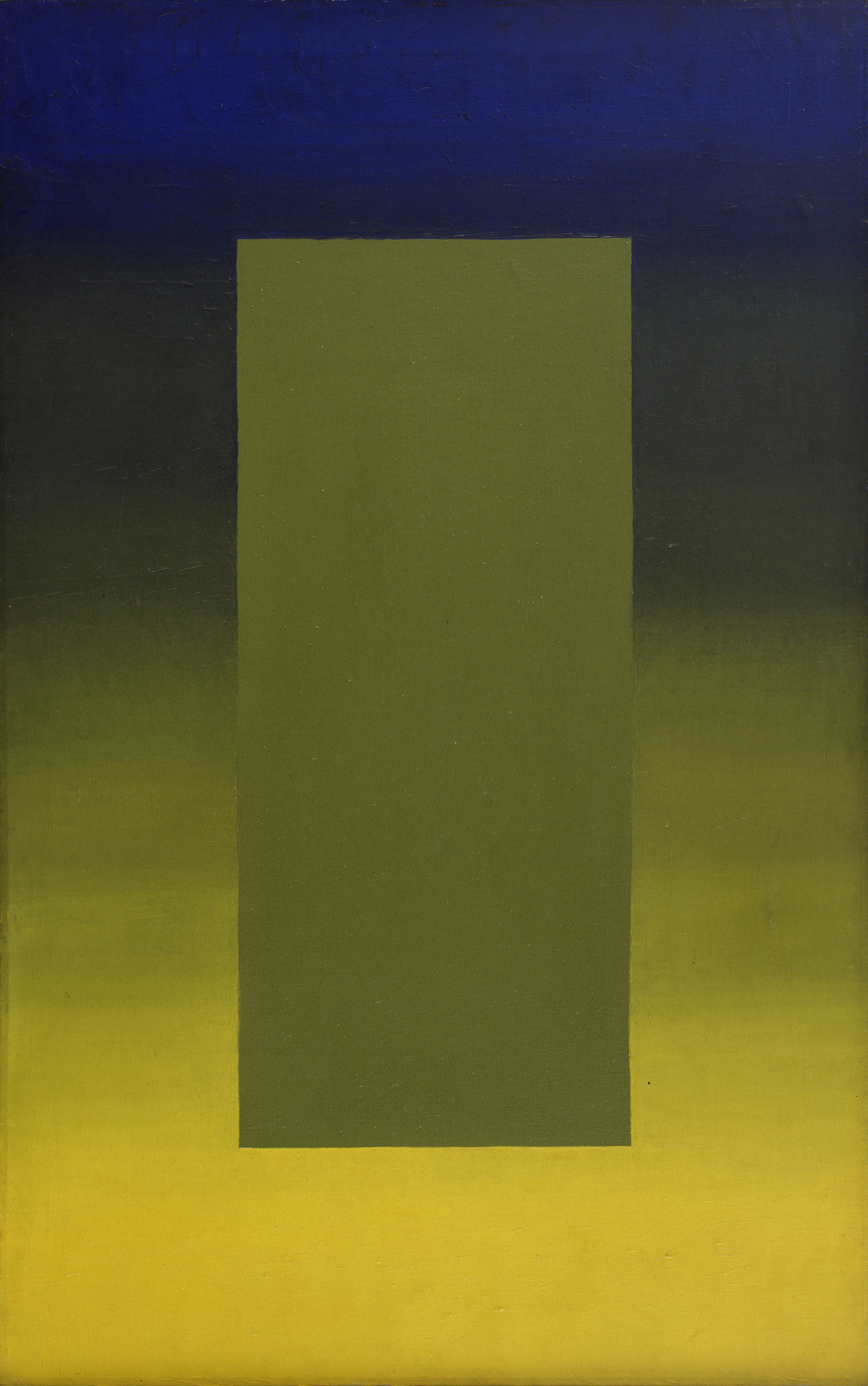
Stefan Gierowski, Painting CCCLXXI, 1976

After completing his studies, in 1948, Gierowski returned to his hometown of Kielce, where he began working as an advisor for art in the Culture Department of the Provincial Council. He also ran an art campfire at the Association of Polish Artists and Designers (Polish: Związek Polskich Artystów Plastyków, ZPAP). In 1949 the artist was offered a job as a technical editor of the "Wieś" magazine, which resulted in his move to Warsaw. In June of that year, an accidental meeting between the artist and Władysław Strzemiński took place at the National Museum in Poznań – fragments of Strzemiński's texts on "Theory of Seeing" and unism were published in the "Wieś" magazine.

The next years are the heyday of family life: a marriage with Anna Golka and the birth of their two children – daughter Magdalena and son Józef. At that time, the artist also illustrated novels by his friend, also a Kielceer, Edmund Niziurski – for example 'Księga Urwisów'. In 1951, Gierowski began working for an Artistic and Graphic Publishing House in the portfolios and albums department. In 1955 he took part in the International Exhibition of Young Artists at the Zachęta National Gallery of Art where his composition 'I Love Life' won second prize. This distinction inaugurated Gierowski's popularity and recognition as a new generation painter.

This position was strengthened by the work 'Gołębnik' / 'The Dovecote' (1955), exhibited at the 6th Exhibition of the Warsaw District in November of the same year, gaining great popularity among critics. Also in 1955, in July the artist took part in the National Exhibition of Young Art entitled "Against War – Against Fascism", also known as "Arsenal", which turned out to be a generational exhibition of artists opposing the style of socialist realism. The artists he met there, including Andrzej Wróblewski, Tadeusz Dominik, Magdalena Więcek, Marian Bogusz, Rajmund Ziemski, Jerzy Tchórzewski, Jacek Sempoliński and Alina Szapocznikow, have become long-time friends of Gierowski. Soon these artists were to become the leading art figures of their generation. In January 1957, the artist exhibited his works for the first time at the Krzywe Koło Gallery, thus beginning a long and fruitful cooperation with Marian Bogusz and the Gallery's artistic circle. Whereas in February of the same year at the General Meeting of Delegates of ZPAP districts Stefan Gierowski was elected as a secretary. Together with the newly elected board, which included Jan Cybis, the President of the Association, and privately his friend, he started working on the new statute of ZPAP. The statute was completely reorganised and political or socialist elements were removed from it. His task was to reorganize the exhibition and popularization structures and animate artistic life in the country. Thanks to Gierowski's efforts, several dozen exhibition spaces subordinate to the association were opened throughout Poland.

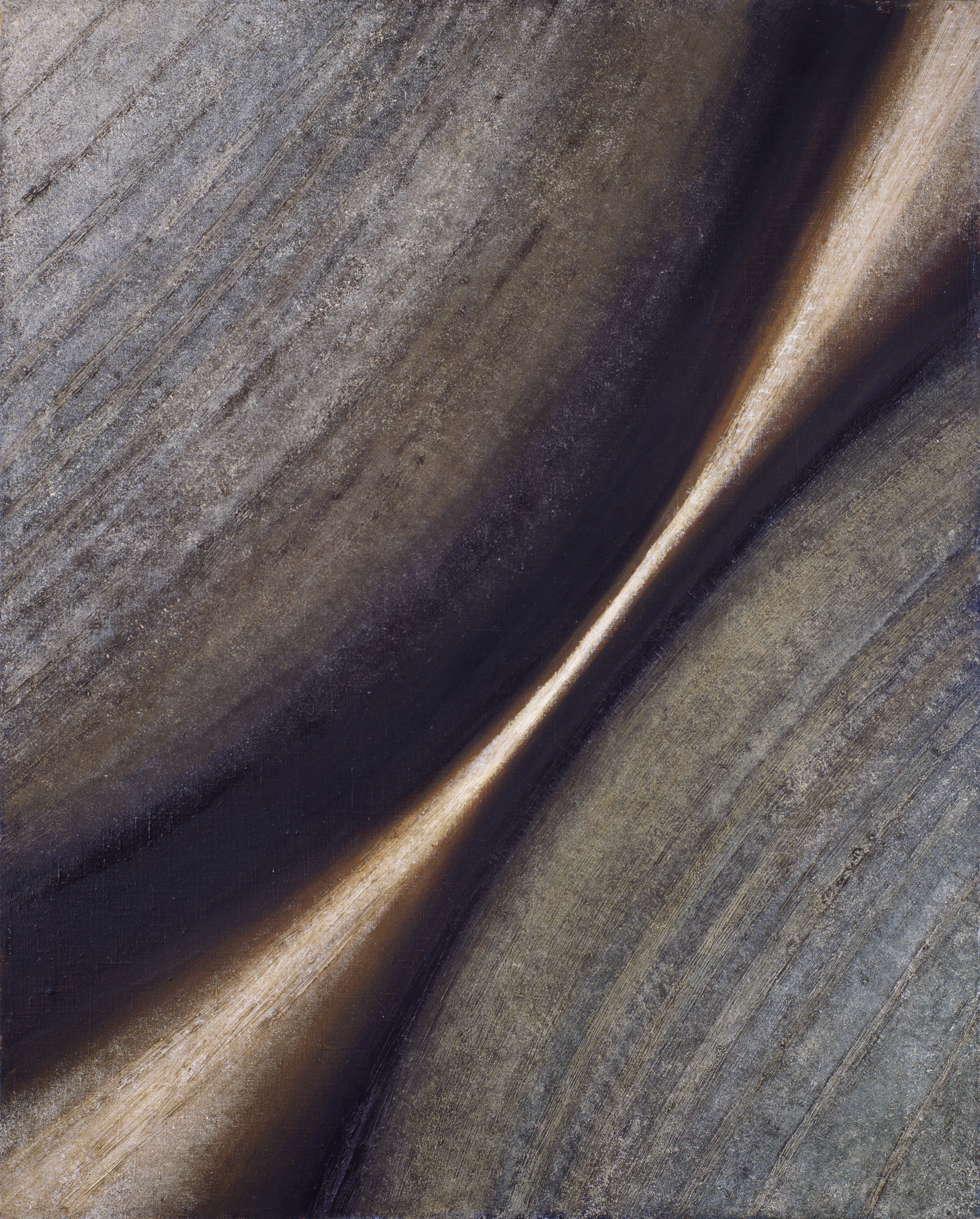
Stefan Gierowski, Painting CXCIII, 1965

In the same year 1957, which proved to be a turning point for the artist's work, Gierowski began a series of Paintings numbered with Roman numerals. These works, shown at the Second Modern Art Exhibition at the Zachęta National Gallery of Art, brought the artist wide recognition among critics, including Julian Przyboś and Zbigniew Herbert. In the following years, Stefan Gierowski, together with Aleksander Wojciechowski and Marian Bogusz, joined the organizing committee of the Confrontation 1960, an event organized by the Krzywe Koło Gallery, which was summed up on 8 September 1960 during the 7th Congress of the International Association of Art Critics (AICA). Together with Bogusz and Wojciechowski, he was responsible for the programme of the Confrontation, and also exhibited his own works as part of one of the exhibitions.

During the late 1950s and early 1960s, Stefan Gierowski repeatedly exhibited his works abroad – he participated in such artistic events as the first Biennale de Paris (1959), the 5th International Biennale of Contemporary Art in São Paulo (1959) and 15 Polish Painters at the Museum of Modern Art in New York (1961). As a result of the success of Polish artists at the Biennale de Paris in 1959, Gierowski, as the second Polish artist, was invited to create an individual exhibition at the Lacloche Gallery in Paris, which opened in April 1961. In the same year, persuaded by Marian Wnuk and Jan Cybis, Gierowski began working at the Academy of Fine Arts in Warsaw, taking up the course of Painting in Architecture at the Aleksander Kobzdej department. Shortly afterwards, in 1965, he opened his own atelier and began educating his students.

His teaching style was characterised by a friendly approach, openness and a programme based on general painting issues such as colour or genre. Over the years, Gierowski's studio has produced over a hundred graduates, including Marian Czapla, Krzysztof Wachowiak, Jarosław Modzelewski, Marek Sobczyk, Ryszard Woźniak, Włodzimierz Pawlak, Tomasz Milanowski, Antoni Starowieyski and Jerzy Kalina. From 1975–1981 he was Dean of the Faculty of Painting, and in 1983 he was elected rector of the academy, but due to opposition from the martial law authorities, he did not take up his post.

In 1980 he became an activist of the Academy of Fine Arts Solidarity, and in 1981 he was a member of the Organizing Committee of the Congress of Polish Culture. Later, in 1982–1988, he was a member of the General and Higher Education Council and the Council for Higher Artistic Education. In 1986 he obtained the title of full professor. Ten years later, in 1996, he retired from education. Until 1995, he maintained constant contact with ZPAP, having held the position of chairman of the painting section several times.

== Personal life and death ==
From 1996, Gierowski lived and worked in Konstancin-Jeziorna, near Warsaw. He died on 14 August 2022, at the age of 97.
