= History of Poland during the Piast dynasty =

Period of Polish history from 960 to 1370

Duchy/Kingdom of Poland (Piast)
- 966–1385
Civitas Schinesghe	Kingdom of Poland (1385–1569)
- Monarchs: Bolesław I the Brave (first); Jadwiga of Poland (last)

The period of rule by the Piast dynasty between the 10th and 14th centuries is the first major stage of the history of the Polish state. The dynasty was founded by a series of dukes listed by the chronicler Gall Anonymous in the early 12th century: Siemowit, Lestek and Siemomysł. It was Mieszko I, the son of Siemomysł, who is considered the founder of the Polish state. Mieszko converted to Christianity of the Western Latin Church in an event known as the Baptism of Poland in 966. His acceptance of Christianity marked the formal beginning of Polish statehood, which was recognized by the Papacy and other Christian states of Europe. The Papal incipit titled Dagome iudex, first defined Poland's geographical boundaries and affirmed that Mieszko was under the protection of the Apostolic See. Mieszko also completed a unification of the Lechitic tribal lands that was fundamental to the existence of the new country of Poland. The ruling house then remained in power in the Polish lands until 1370.

Following the emergence of the Polish state, a series of rulers converted the population to Christianity, created a kingdom of Poland in 1025 and integrated Poland into the prevailing culture of Europe. Mieszko's son Bolesław I the Brave established a Roman Catholic Archdiocese in Gniezno, pursued territorial conquests and was officially crowned in 1025 as the first king of Poland. The first Piast monarchy collapsed with the death of Mieszko II Lambert in 1034, followed by its restoration under Casimir I the Restorer in 1042. In the process, the royal dignity of Polish rulers was forfeited, and the state reverted to the status of a duchy. Duke Casimir's son Bolesław II the Bold revived the military assertiveness of Bolesław I the Brave, but became fatally involved in a conflict with Bishop Stanislaus of Szczepanów and was expelled from the country.

Bolesław III Wrymouth, the last duke of the early period, succeeded in defending his country and recovering territories previously lost. Upon his death in 1138, Poland was divided among his sons. The resulting internal fragmentation eroded the initial Piast monarchical structure in the 12th and 13th centuries and caused fundamental and lasting changes.

Konrad I of Masovia invited the Teutonic Knights to help him fight the Baltic Prussian pagans, which led to centuries of Poland's warfare with the Knights and the German Prussian state.

In 1320, the kingdom was restored under Władysław I the Elbow-high, then strengthened and expanded by his son Casimir III the Great. The western provinces of Silesia and Pomerania were lost after the fragmentation, and Poland began expanding to the east. The period ended with the reigns of two members of the Capetian House of Anjou between 1370 and 1384. The consolidation in the 14th century laid the base for the new powerful kingdom of Poland that was to follow.

== 10th–12th century ==
=== Mieszko I and the adoption of Christianity in Poland (c. 960–992) ===
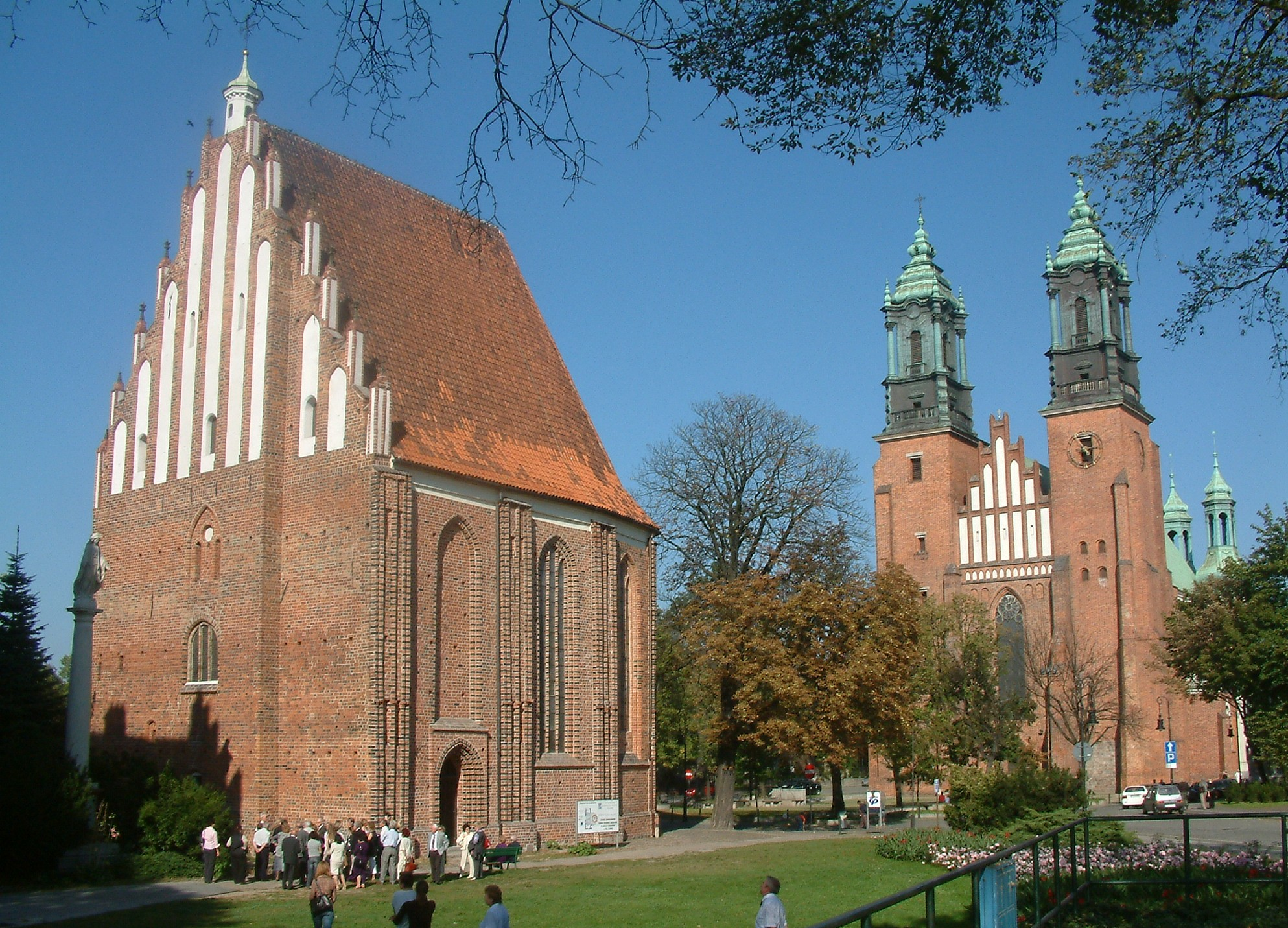
Important early stages in the history of the Polish state and church took place on the island of Ostrów Tumski. Remnants of the original palatium – chapel complex of Poland's first Christian ruling couple have been found beneath the church in the foreground. The Poznań Cathedral is located on the right.

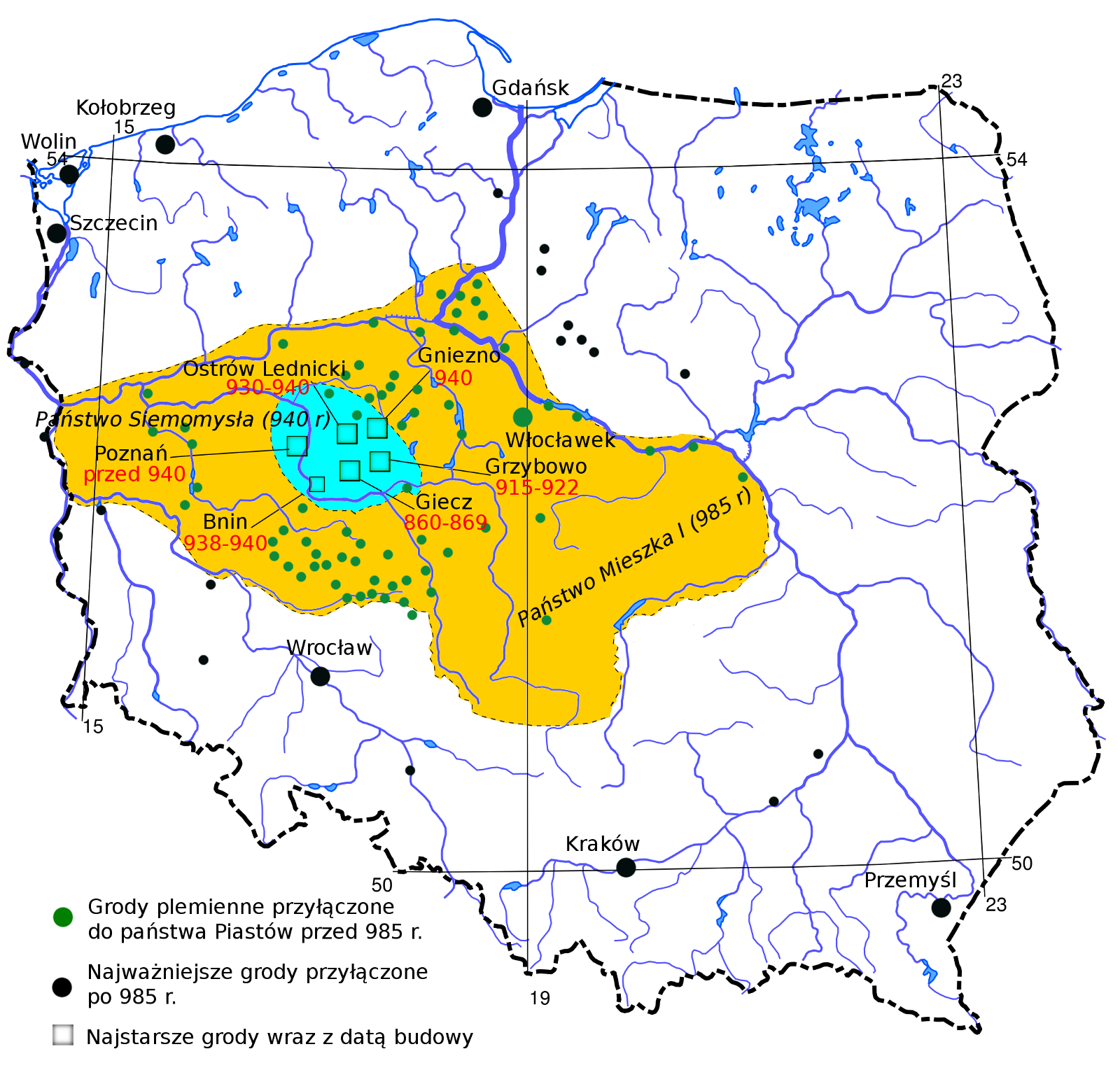
Expansion of the Polans territory under the Piast dynasty in the 10th century

The tribe of the Polans (Polish: Polanie; lit. 'people of the fields') in what is now Greater Poland gave rise to a tribal predecessor of the Polish state in the early part of the 10th century, with the Polans settling in the flatlands around the emerging strongholds of Giecz, Poznań, Gniezno and Ostrów Lednicki. Accelerated rebuilding of old tribal fortified settlements, construction of massive new ones and territorial expansion took place during the period c. 920–950. The Polish state developed from these tribal roots in the second half of the century. According to the 12th century chronicler Gallus Anonymus, the Polans were ruled at this time by the Piast dynasty. In existing sources from the 10th century, Piast ruler Mieszko I was first mentioned by Widukind of Corvey in his Res gestae saxonicae, a chronicle of events in Germany. Widukind reported that Mieszko's forces were twice defeated in 963 by the Veleti tribes acting in cooperation with the Saxon exile Wichmann the Younger. Under Mieszko's rule (c. 960 to 992), his tribal state accepted Christianity and became the Polish state.

The viability of the Mieszko's emerging state was assured by the persistent territorial expansion of the early Piast rulers. Beginning with a very small area around Gniezno (before the town itself existed), the Piast expansion lasted throughout most of the 10th century and resulted in a territory approximating that of present-day Poland. The Polanie tribe conquered and merged with other Slavic tribes and first formed a tribal federation, then later a centralized state. After the addition of Lesser Poland, the country of the Vistulans, and of Silesia (both taken by Mieszko from the Czech state during the later part of the 10th century), Mieszko's state reached its mature form, including the main regions regarded as ethnically Polish. The Piast lands totaled about 250,000 km^{2} (96,526 sq mi) in area, with an approximate population of under one million.

Initially a pagan, Mieszko I was the first ruler of the Polans tribal union known from contemporary written sources. A detailed account of aspects of Mieszko's early reign was given by Ibrahim ibn Yaqub, a Jewish traveler, according to whom Mieszko was one of four Slavic "kings" established in central and southern Europe in the 960s. In 965, Mieszko, who was allied with Boleslaus I, Duke of Bohemia at the time, married the duke's daughter Doubravka of Bohemia, a Christian princess. Mieszko's conversion to Latin Christianity followed on 14 April 966, an event known as the Baptism of Poland that is considered to be the founding event of the Polish state. In the aftermath of Mieszko's victory over a force of the Velunzani in 967, which was led by Wichmann, the first missionary bishop was appointed: Jordan, bishop of Poland. The action counteracted the intended eastern expansion of the Magdeburg Archdiocese, which was established at about the same time.

Mieszko's state had a complex political relationship with the German Holy Roman Empire, as Mieszko was a "friend", ally and vassal of Holy Roman Emperor Otto I and paid him tribute from the western part of his lands. Mieszko fought wars with the Polabian Slavs, the Czechs, Margrave Gero of the Saxon Eastern March in 963–964 and Margrave Odo I of the Saxon Eastern March in 972 in the Battle of Cedynia. The victories over Wichmann and Odo allowed Mieszko to extend his Pomeranian possessions west to the vicinity of the Oder River and its mouth. After the death of Otto I, and then again after the death of Holy Roman Emperor Otto II, Mieszko supported Henry the Quarrelsome, a pretender to the imperial crown. After the death of Doubravka in 977, Mieszko married Oda of Haldensleben, daughter of Dietrich, Margrave of the Northern March, c. 980. When fighting the Czechs in 990, Mieszko was helped by the Holy Roman Empire. By about the year 990, when Mieszko I officially submitted his country to the authority of the Holy See (Dagome iudex), he had transformed Poland into one of the strongest powers in central-eastern Europe.

=== The reign of Bolesław I and establishment of a Kingdom of Poland (992–1025) ===
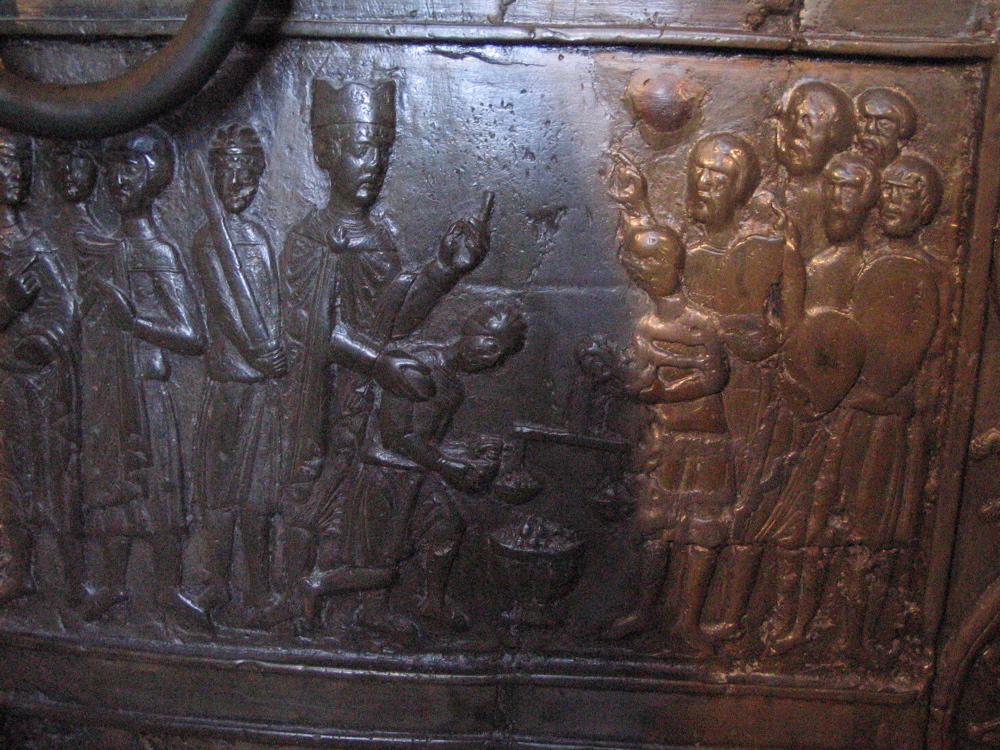
An image on the Gniezno Doors at the entrance to Gniezno Cathedral depicts Bolesław buying Adalbert's body back from the Prussians

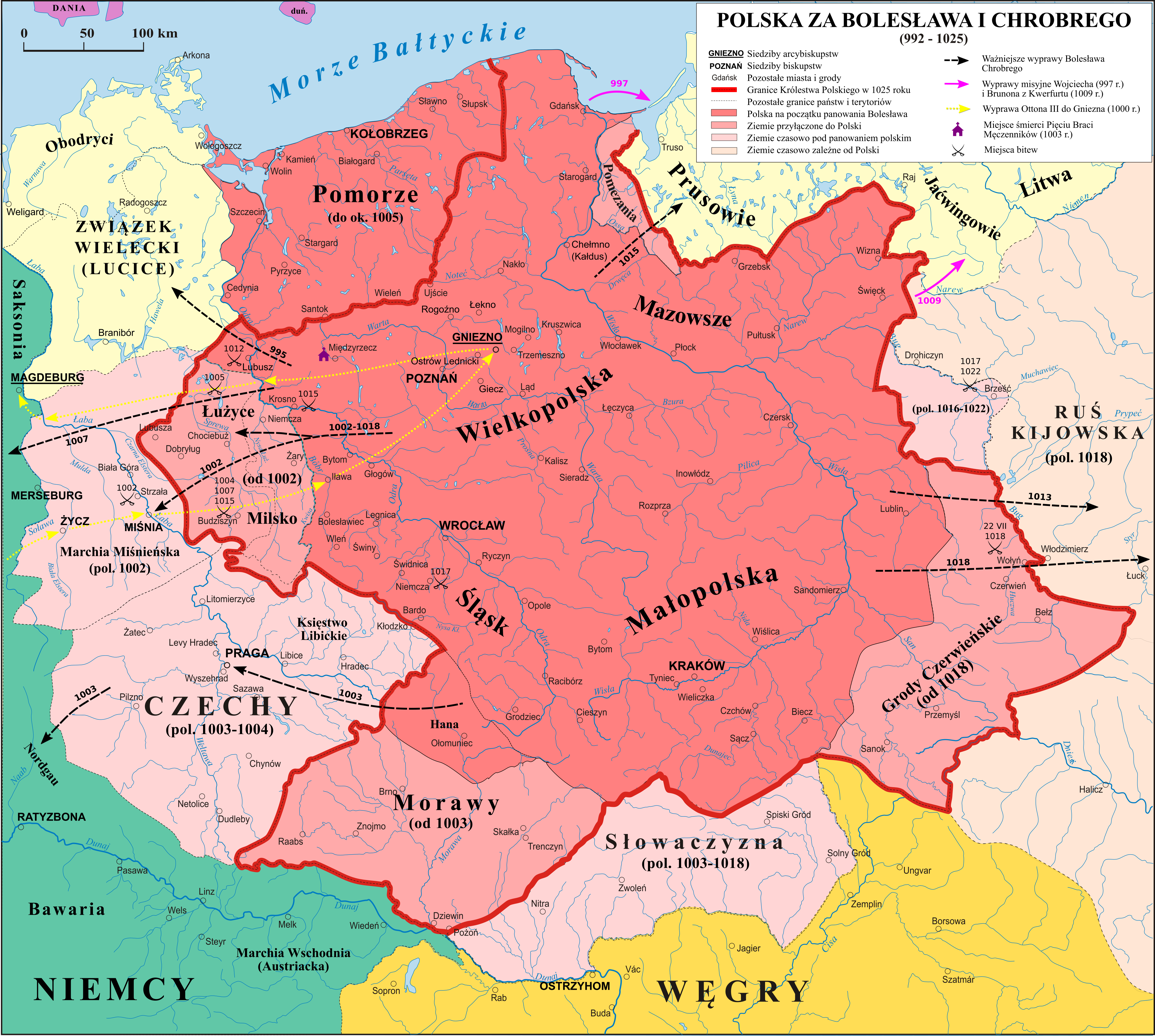
Poland (992–1025); area within dark pink color represents the borders at the end of the rule of Mieszko I (992); dark red border comprises the area at the end of the reign of Bolesław I (1025)

One of the most important concerns of Bolesław's early reign was building up the Polish church. Bolesław cultivated Adalbert of Prague of the Slavník family, a well-connected Czech bishop in exile and missionary who was killed in 997 while on a mission in Prussia. Bolesław skillfully took advantage of his death: his martyrdom led to his elevation as patron saint of Poland and resulted in the creation of an independent Polish province of the Church with Radim Gaudentius as Archbishop of Gniezno. In the year 1000, the young Emperor Otto III came as a pilgrim to visit St. Adalbert's grave and lent his support to Bolesław during the Congress of Gniezno; the Archdiocese of Gniezno and several subordinate dioceses were established on this occasion. The Polish ecclesiastical province effectively served as an essential anchor and an institution to fall back on for the Piast state, helping it to survive in the troubled centuries ahead.

Bolesław at first chose to continue his father's policy of cooperation with the Holy Roman Empire but when Emperor Otto III died in 1002, Bolesław's relationship with his successor Henry II turned out to be much more difficult, and it resulted in a series of wars (1002–1005, 1007–1013, 1015–1018). From 1003 to 1004, Bolesław intervened militarily in Czech dynastic conflicts. After his forces were removed from Bohemia in 1018, Bolesław retained Moravia. In 1013, the marriage between Bolesław's son Mieszko II Lambert and Richeza of Lotharingia, the niece of Emperor Otto III and future mother of Casimir I the Restorer, took place. The conflicts with Germany ended in 1018 with the Peace of Bautzen on favorable terms for Bolesław. In the context of the 1018 Kiev expedition, Bolesław took over the western part of Red Ruthenia. In 1025, shortly before his death, Bolesław I finally succeeded in obtaining the papal permission to crown himself, and he became the first king of Poland.

Bolesław's expansionist policies were costly to the Polish state and were not always successful. He lost, for example, the economically crucial Farther Pomerania in 1005 together with its new bishopric in Kołobrzeg; the region had previously been conquered with great effort by Mieszko.

=== Mieszko II and the collapse of the Piast kingdom (1025–1039) ===
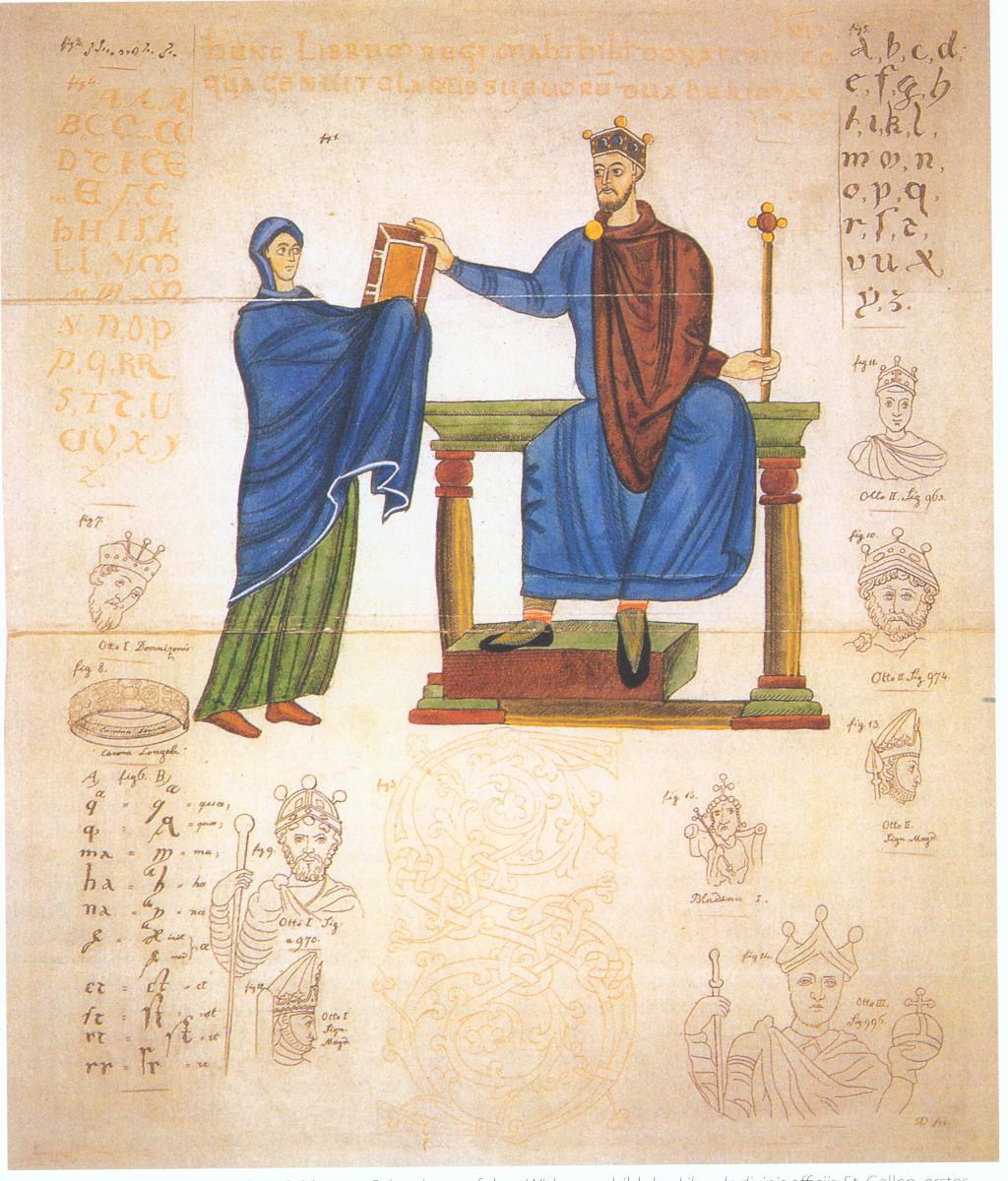
Mieszko II Lambert shown allegorically with Duchess Matilda of Swabia

King Mieszko II Lambert (r. 1025–1034) tried to continue the expansionist politics of his father. His actions reinforced old resentment and hostility on the part of Poland's neighbors, and his two dispossessed brothers took advantage of it by arranging for invasions from Germany and Kievan Rus' in 1031. Mieszko was defeated and forced to leave Poland. Mieszko's brother Bezprym was murdered in 1032, whereas his brother Otto died in unclear circumstances in 1033, events that permitted Mieszko to recover his authority partially. The first Piast monarchy then collapsed with Mieszko's death in 1034. Deprived of a government, Poland was ravaged by an anti-feudal and pagan rebellion, and in 1039, there was an invasion by the forces of Bretislaus I of Bohemia. The country suffered territorial losses, and the functioning of the Gniezno archdiocese was disrupted.

=== Reunification of Poland under Casimir I (1039–1058) ===
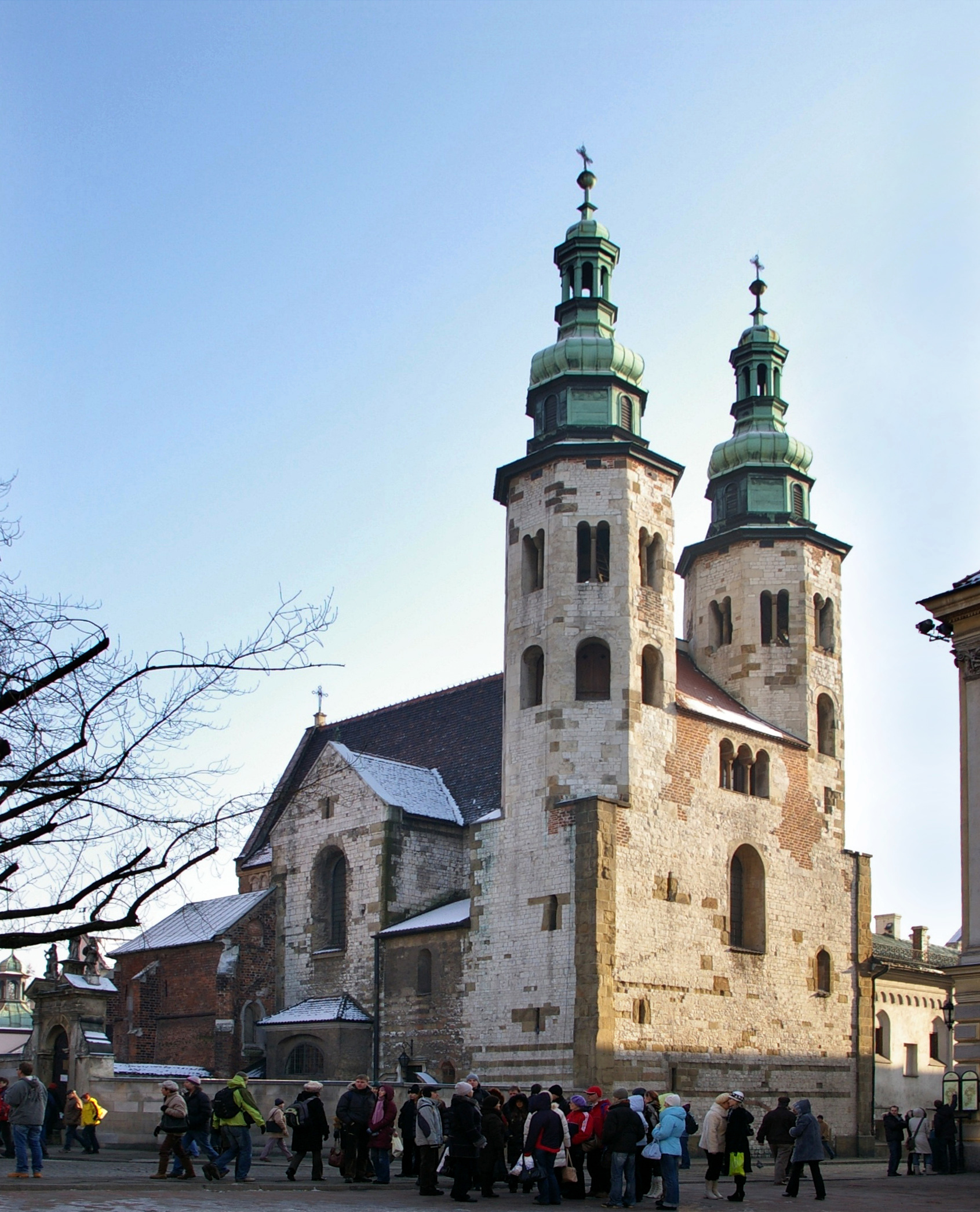
St. Andrew's Church in Kraków (built in the 11th century)

Poland made a recovery under Mieszko's son, Duke Casimir I (r. 1039–1058), known to history as the Restorer. After returning from exile in 1039, Casimir rebuilt the Polish monarchy and the country's territorial integrity through several military campaigns: in 1047, Masovia was taken back from Miecław, a Polish noble who tried to detach the region from the rule of the Polish monarch, and in 1054 Silesia was recovered from the Czechs. Casimir was aided by recent adversaries of Poland, the Holy Roman Empire and Kievan Rus', both of whom disliked the chaos in Poland left after the dismemberment of the country beginning in the reign of Mieszko II. Casimir introduced a more mature form of feudalism and relieved the burden of financing large army units from the duke's treasury by settling his warriors on feudal estates. Faced with the widespread destruction of Greater Poland after the Czech incursion, Casimir moved his court to Kraków and replaced the old Piast capitals of Poznań and Gniezno; Kraków would function as the capital of the realm for several centuries.

=== Bolesław II and the conflict with Bishop Stanisław (1058–1079) ===
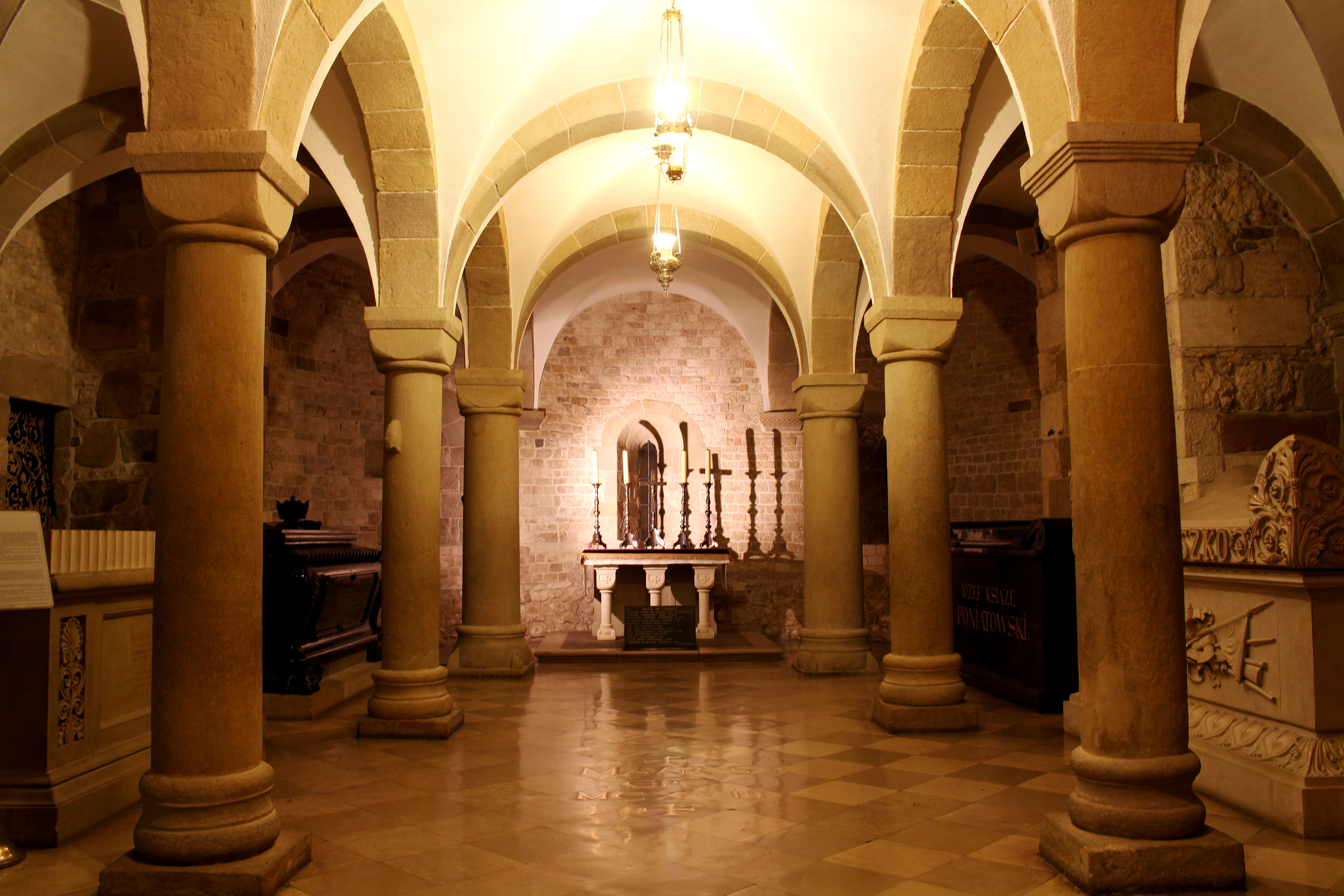
St. Leonard's Crypt is all that remains of the second Romanesque Wawel Cathedral of Władysław I Herman.

Casimir's son Bolesław II the Bold, also known as the Generous (r. 1058–1079), developed Polish military strength and waged several foreign campaigns between 1058 and 1077. As an active supporter of the papacy in its Investiture Controversy with the German emperor, Bolesław crowned himself king in 1076 with the blessing of Pope Gregory VII. In 1079, there was an anti-Bolesław conspiracy or conflict that involved the Bishop of Kraków. Bolesław had Bishop Stanislaus of Szczepanów executed; subsequently, Bolesław was forced to abdicate the Polish throne due to pressure from the Catholic Church and the pro-imperial faction of the nobility. Stanisłaus would become the second martyr and patron saint of Poland (known in English as St. Stanislav), canonised in 1253.

=== Reign of Władysław I Herman (1079–1102) ===
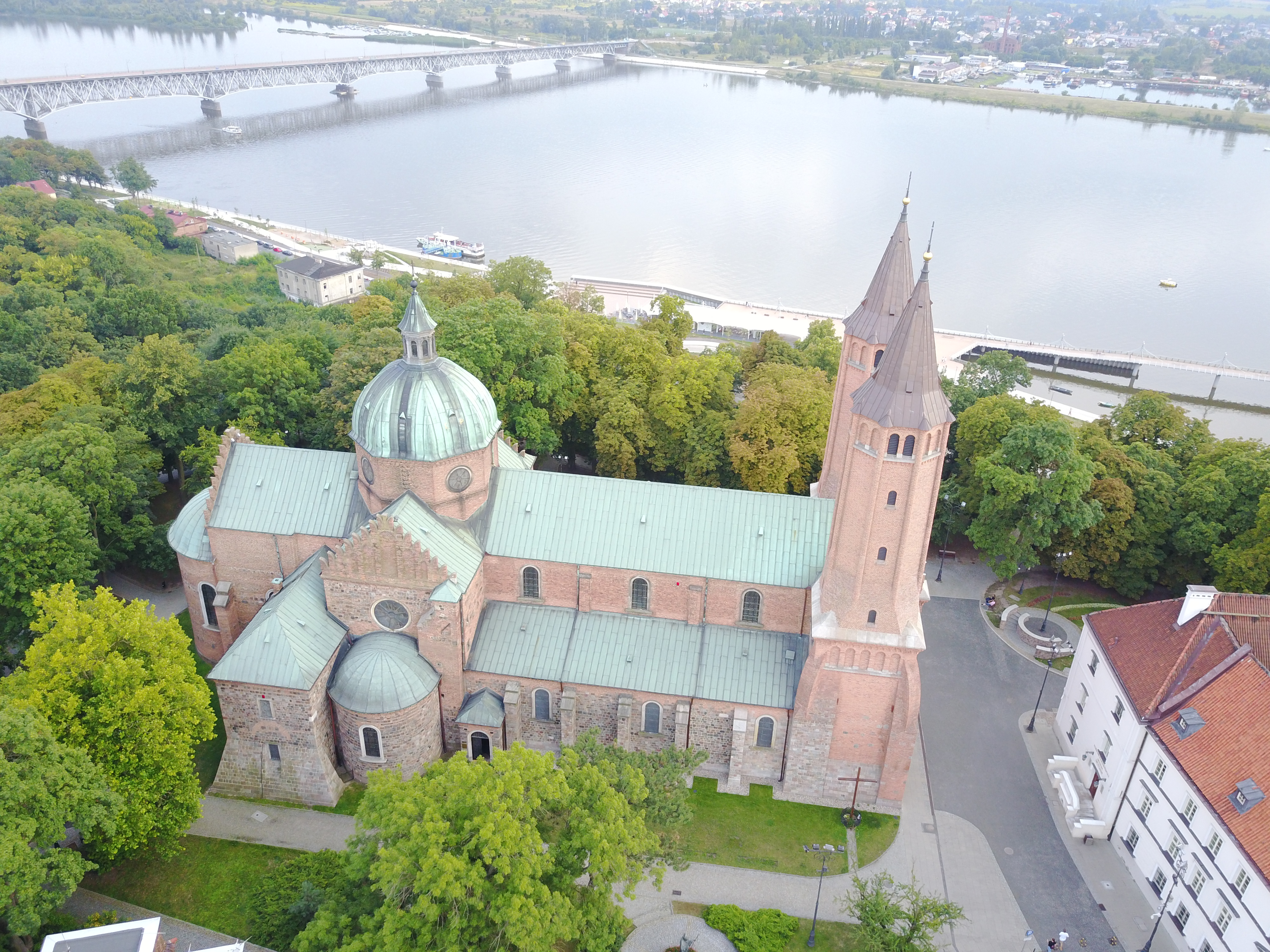
Płock Cathedral is the burial place of Władysław I Herman and Bolesław III Wrymouth.

After Bolesław's exile, the country found itself under the unstable rule of his younger brother Władysław I Herman (r. 1079–1102). Władysław was strongly dependent on Count Palatine Sieciech, an advisor from the ranks of the Polish nobility who acted much as the power behind the throne. When Władysław's two sons, Zbigniew and Bolesław, finally forced Władysław to remove his hated protégé, Poland was divided among the three of them from 1098, and after the father's death, from 1102 to 1106, it was divided between the two brothers.

=== Reign of Bolesław III (1102–1138) ===
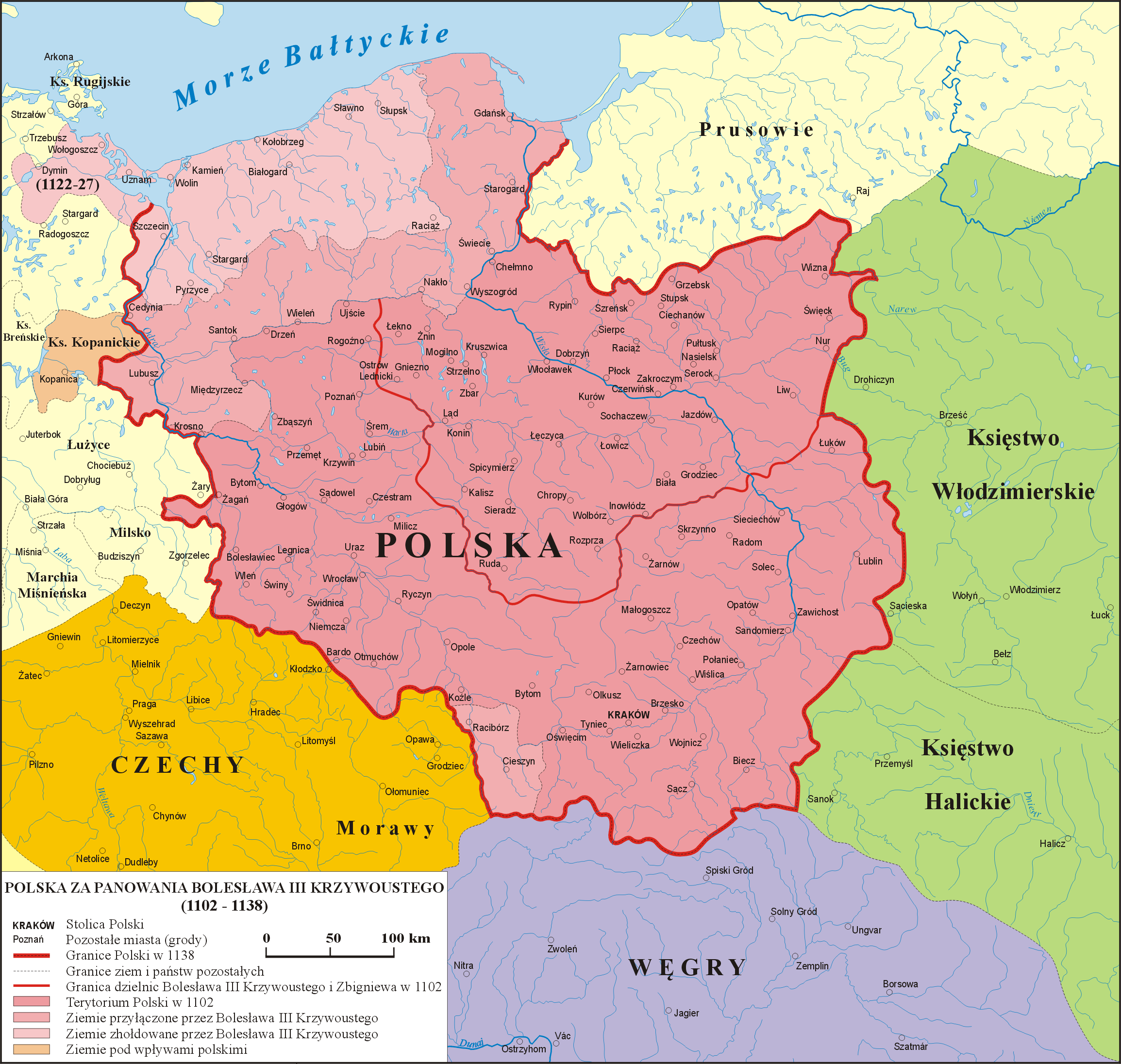
Poland during the rule of Bolesław III Wrymouth

After a power struggle, Bolesław III Wrymouth (r. 1102–1138) became the duke of Poland by defeating his half-brother Zbigniew in 1106–1107. Zbigniew had to leave the country, but received support from the Holy Roman Emperor Henry V, who attacked Bolesław's Poland in 1109. Bolesław was able to defend his realm due to his military abilities, determination and alliances, and also because of a societal mobilisation across the social spectrum (see Battle of Głogów). Zbigniew, who later returned, died in mysterious circumstances, perhaps in the summer of 1113. Bolesław's other major achievement was the conquest of all of Mieszko I's Pomerania (of which the remaining eastern part had been lost by Poland from after the death of Mieszko II), a task begun by his father Władysław I Herman and completed by Bolesław around 1123. Szczecin was subdued in a bloody takeover and Western Pomerania up to Rügen, except for the directly incorporated southern part, became Bolesław's fief, to be ruled locally by Wartislaw I, the first duke of the Griffin dynasty.

At this time, Christianisation of the region was initiated in earnest, an effort crowned by the establishment of the Pomeranian Wolin Diocese after Bolesław's death in 1140.

=== Fragmentation of the realm (1138–1320) ===
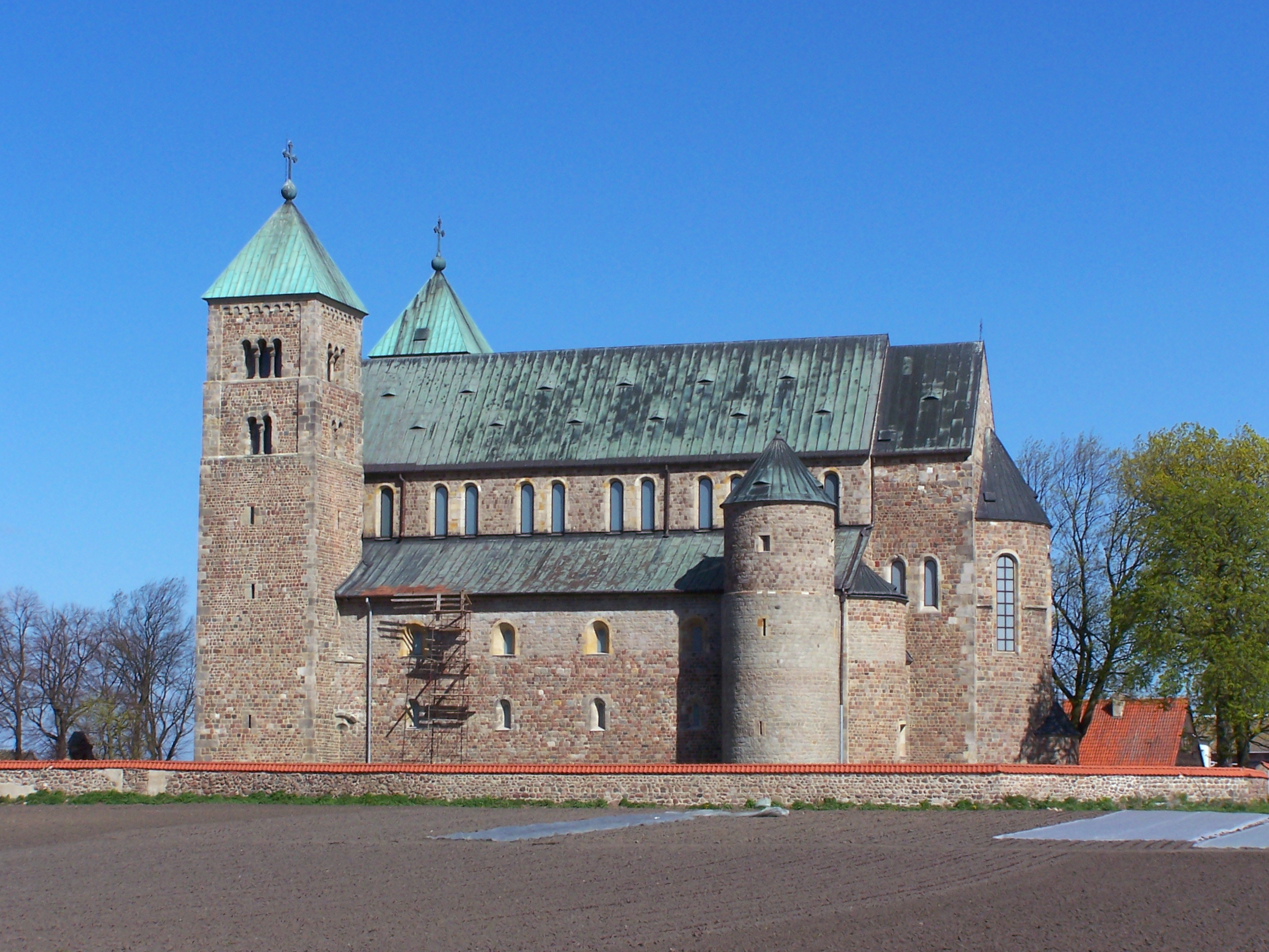
Collegiate church in Tum

Before he died, Bolesław III Wrymouth divided the country, in a limited sense, among four of his sons. He made complex arrangements intended to prevent fratricidal warfare and preserve the Polish state's formal unity, but after Bolesław's death, the implementation of the plan failed and a long period of fragmentation was ushered in. For nearly two centuries, the Piasts would spar with each other, the clergy, and the nobility for control over the divided kingdom. The stability of the system was supposedly assured by the institution of the senior or high duke of Poland, based in Kraków and assigned to the special Seniorate Province that was not to be subdivided. Following his concept of seniorate, Bolesław divided the country into five principalities: Silesia, Greater Poland, Masovia, Sandomierz and Kraków. The first four provinces were given to his four sons, who became independent rulers. The fifth province, the Seniorate Province of Kraków, was to be added to the senior among the princes who, as the Grand Duke of Kraków, was the representative of the whole of Poland. This principle broke down already within the generation of Bolesław III's sons, when Władysław II the Exile, Bolesław IV the Curly, Mieszko III the Old and Casimir II the Just fought for power and territory in Poland, and in particular over the throne of Kraków.

The external borders left by Bolesław III at his death closely resembled the borders left by Mieszko I; this original early Piast monarchy configuration had not survived the fragmentation period.

=== Culture ===
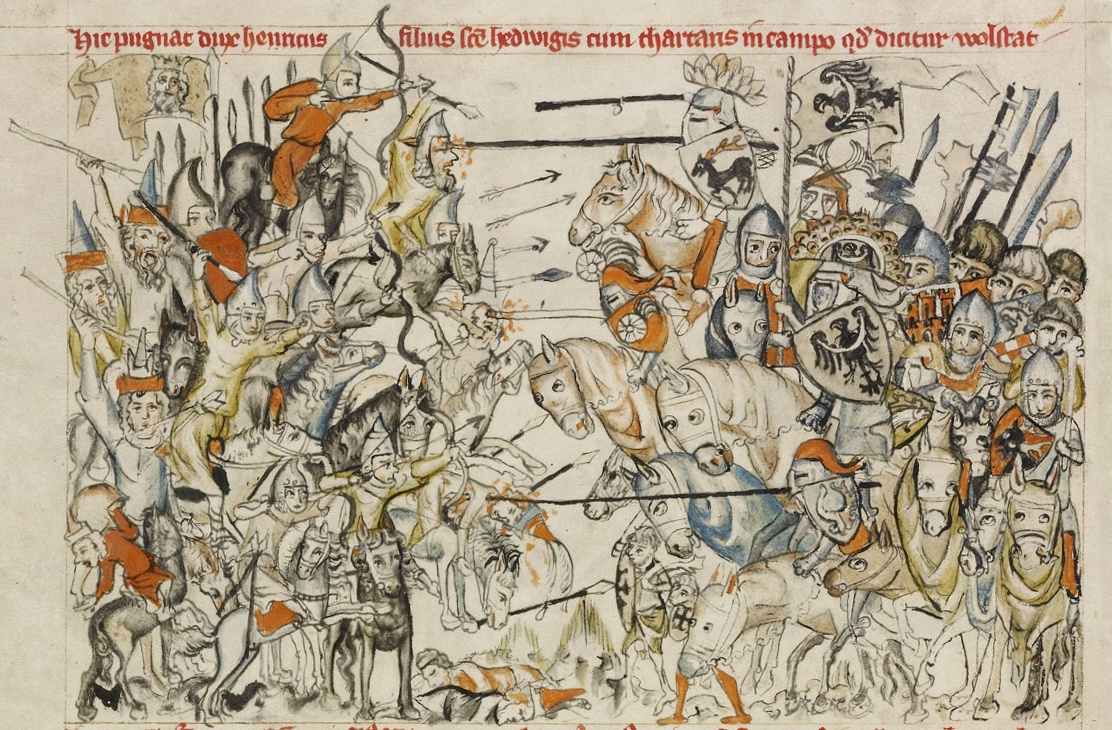
Mongol invasion of Poland (late 1240–1241) culminated in the Battle of Legnica

From the time of the conversion of Poland's ruling elite to Christianity in the 10th century, foreign churchmen had been arriving and the culture of early Medieval Poland was developing as a part of European Christendom. However, it would be a few generations from the time of Mieszko's conversion until significant numbers of native clergymen appeared. After the establishment of numerous monasteries in the 12th and 13th centuries, Christianisation of the populace was accomplished on a larger scale.

Intellectual and artistic activity was concentrated around the institutions of the Church, the courts of the kings and dukes, and emerged around the households of the rising hereditary elite. Written annals began to be generated in the late 10th century; leaders such as Mieszko II and Casimir the Restorer were considered literate and educated. Along with the Dagome iudex act, the most important written document and source of the period is the Gesta principum Polonorum, a chronicle by Gallus Anonymus, a foreign cleric from the court of Bolesław Wrymouth. Bruno of Querfurt was one of the pioneering Western clergymen spreading Church literacy; some of his prominent writings had been produced in eremitic monasteries in Poland. Among the preeminent early monastic religious orders were the Benedictines (the abbey in Tyniec founded in 1044) and the Cistercians.

== 13th century ==
=== State and society; German settlement ===
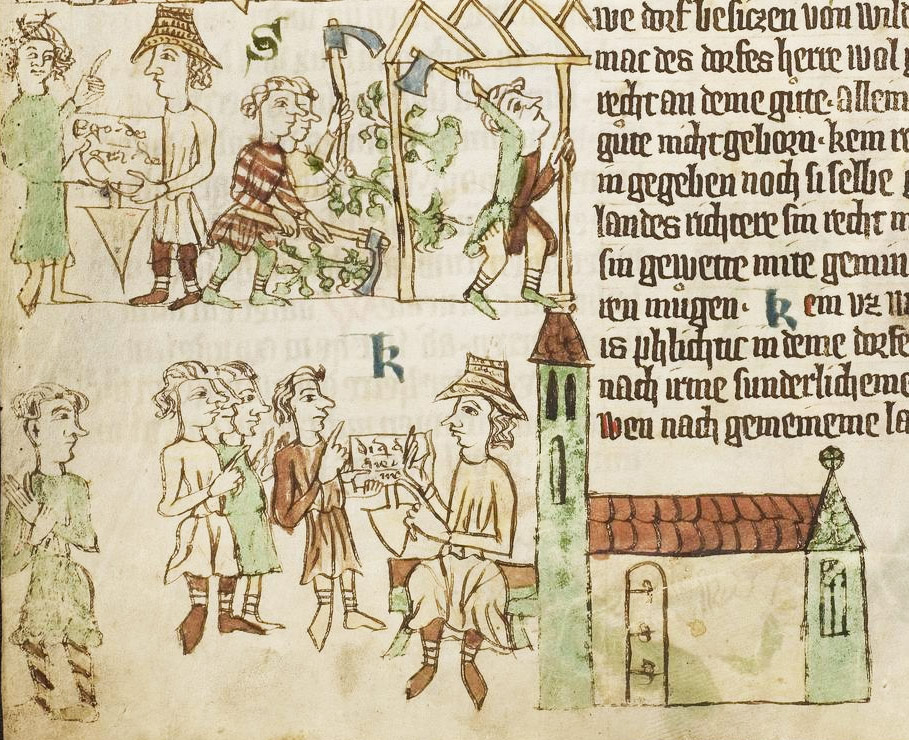
Ostsiedlung or German settlement in the east, miniature from Sachsenspiegel

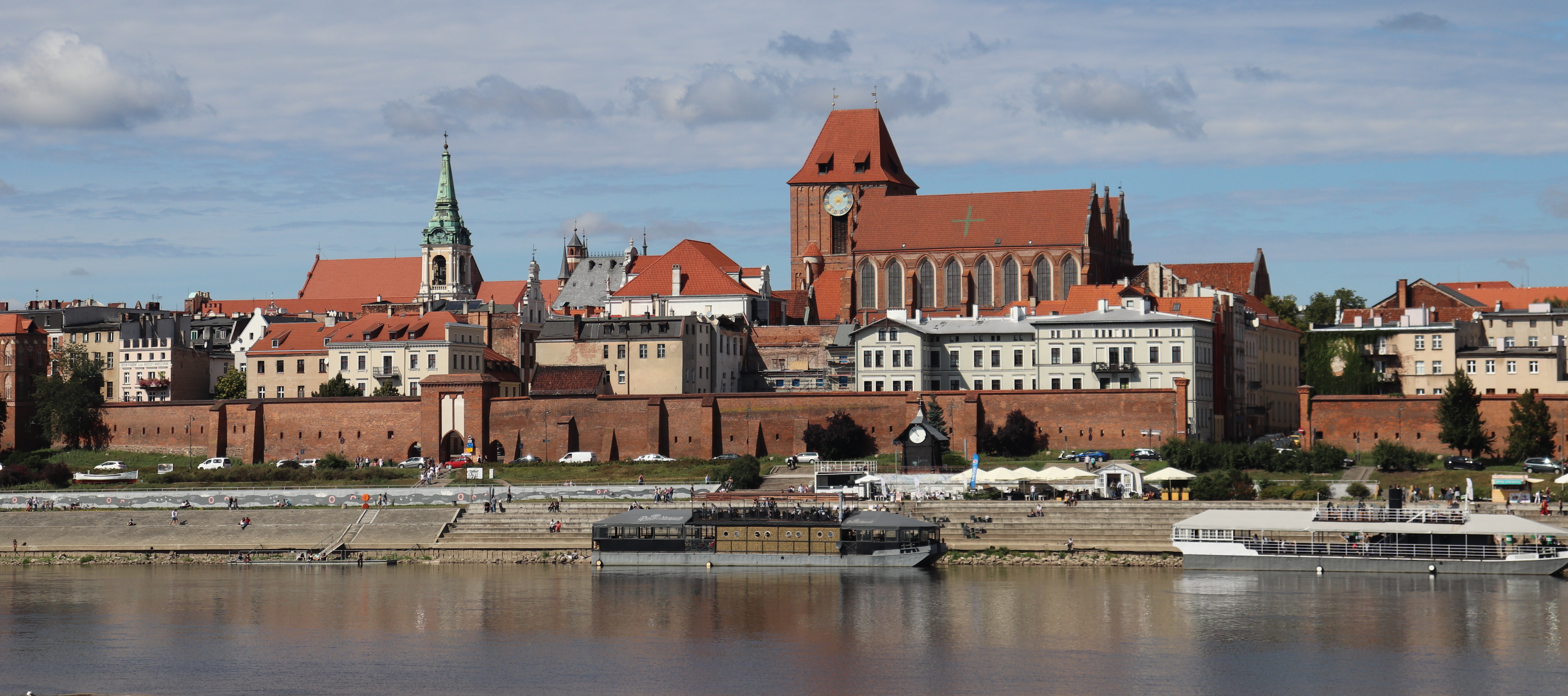
Thorn (Toruń), established by the Teutonic Knights became a member of the Hanseatic League

The 13th century brought fundamental changes to the structure of Polish society and its political system. Because of constant internal conflicts, the Piast dukes were unable to stabilize Poland's external borders. Western Farther Pomerania broke its political ties with Poland in the second half of the 12th century and from 1231 became a fief of the Margraviate of Brandenburg, which in 1307 extended its Pomeranian possessions even further east, taking over the Sławno and Słupsk areas. Pomerelia or Gdańsk Pomerania became independent of the Polish dukes from 1227. In the mid-13th century, Bolesław II the Bald granted Lubusz Land to the Margraviate, which made possible the creation of the Neumark and had far reaching negative consequences for the integrity of the western border. In the south-east, Leszek the White was unable to preserve Poland's supremacy over the Halych area of Rus', a territory that had changed hands on a number of occasions.

The social status was becoming increasingly based on the size of feudal land possessions. Those included the lands controlled by the Piast princes, their rivals, the great lay land owners and church entities, and the knightly class. The work force ranged from hired "free" people to serfs attached to the land, to slaves (either purchased, forced into slavery after capture in war or forced into slavery as prisoners). The upper layer of the feudal lords, first the Church and then others, was able to acquire economic and legal immunity, which exempted it to a significant degree from court jurisdiction and economic obligations such as taxation that had previously been imposed by the ruling dukes.

Civil strife and foreign invasions, such as the Mongol invasions in 1240/1241, 1259/1260 and 1287/1288, weakened and depopulated many of the small Polish principalities, as the country was becoming progressively more subdivided. Depopulation and increasing demand for labor caused a massive immigration of West European peasants into Poland, mostly German settlers; the early waves from Germany and Flanders occurred in the 1220s. The German, Polish and other new rural settlements represented a form of feudal tenancy with legal immunity and German town laws were often utilised as its legal bases. German immigrants were also important in the rise of the cities and the establishment of the Polish burgher (city dwelling merchants) class; they brought with them West European laws (Magdeburg rights) and customs that the Poles adopted. From that time, the Germans, who created early strong establishments (led by patriciates) especially in the urban centers of Silesia and other regions of western Poland, were an increasingly influential minority in Poland.

In 1228, the Acts of Cienia were passed and signed into law by Władysław III Spindleshanks. The titular Duke of Poland promised to provide a "just and noble law according to the council of bishops and barons". Such legal guarantees and privileges included the lower level land owners and knights, who were evolving into the lower and middle nobility class known later as szlachta. The period of fragmentation weakened the rulers and established a permanent trend in Polish history, whereby the rights and role of the nobility were expanded at the monarch's expense.

=== Relations with the Teutonic Knights ===
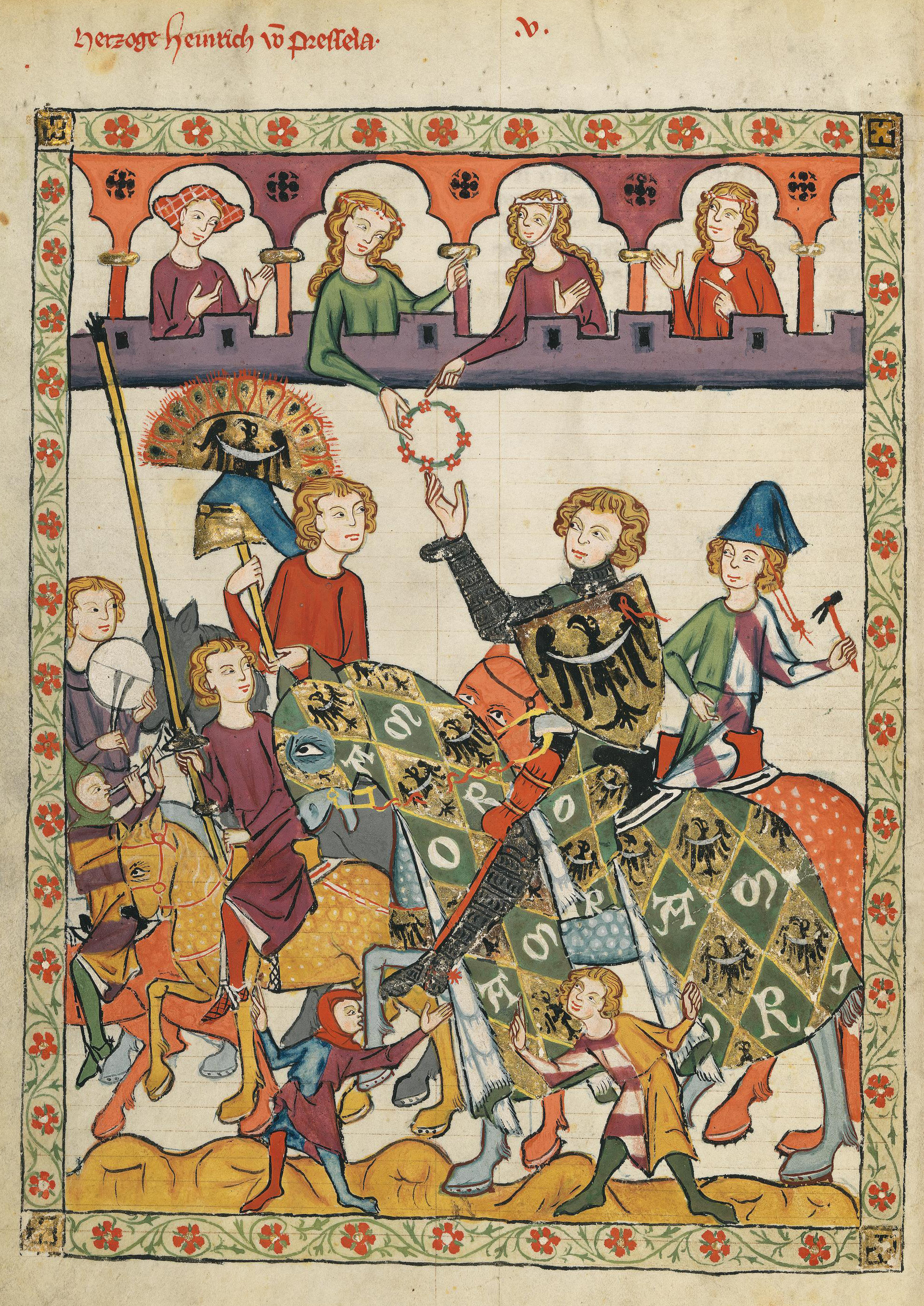
Henry IV of Wrocław in the Codex Manesse, about 1300

In 1226, Duke Konrad I of Masovia invited the Teutonic Knights to help him fight the pagan, Baltic Old Prussians, who lived in a territory adjacent to his lands; substantial border warfare was taking place and Konrad's province was suffering from Prussian invasions. On the other hand, the Old Prussians themselves were at that time being subjected to increasingly forced, but largely ineffective Christianisation efforts, including Northern Crusades sponsored by the papacy. The Teutonic Order soon overstepped their authority and moved beyond the area granted them by Konrad (Chełmno Land or Kulmerland). In the following decades, they conquered large areas along the Baltic Sea coast and established their own monastic state. As virtually all of the Western Baltic pagans became converted or exterminated (the Prussian conquests were completed by 1283), the Knights confronted Poland and Lithuania, then the last pagan state in Europe. Teutonic wars with Poland and Lithuania continued for most of the 14th and 15th centuries. The Teutonic state in Prussia, increasingly populated by German settlers beginning in the 13th century, but still retaining a majority Baltic population, had been claimed as a fief and protected by the popes and Holy Roman Emperors.

=== Reunification attempts and the reigns of Przemysł II and Václav II (1232–1305) ===
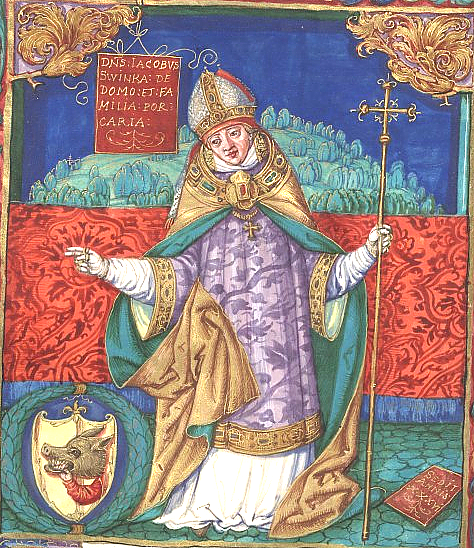
Archbishop Jakub Świnka

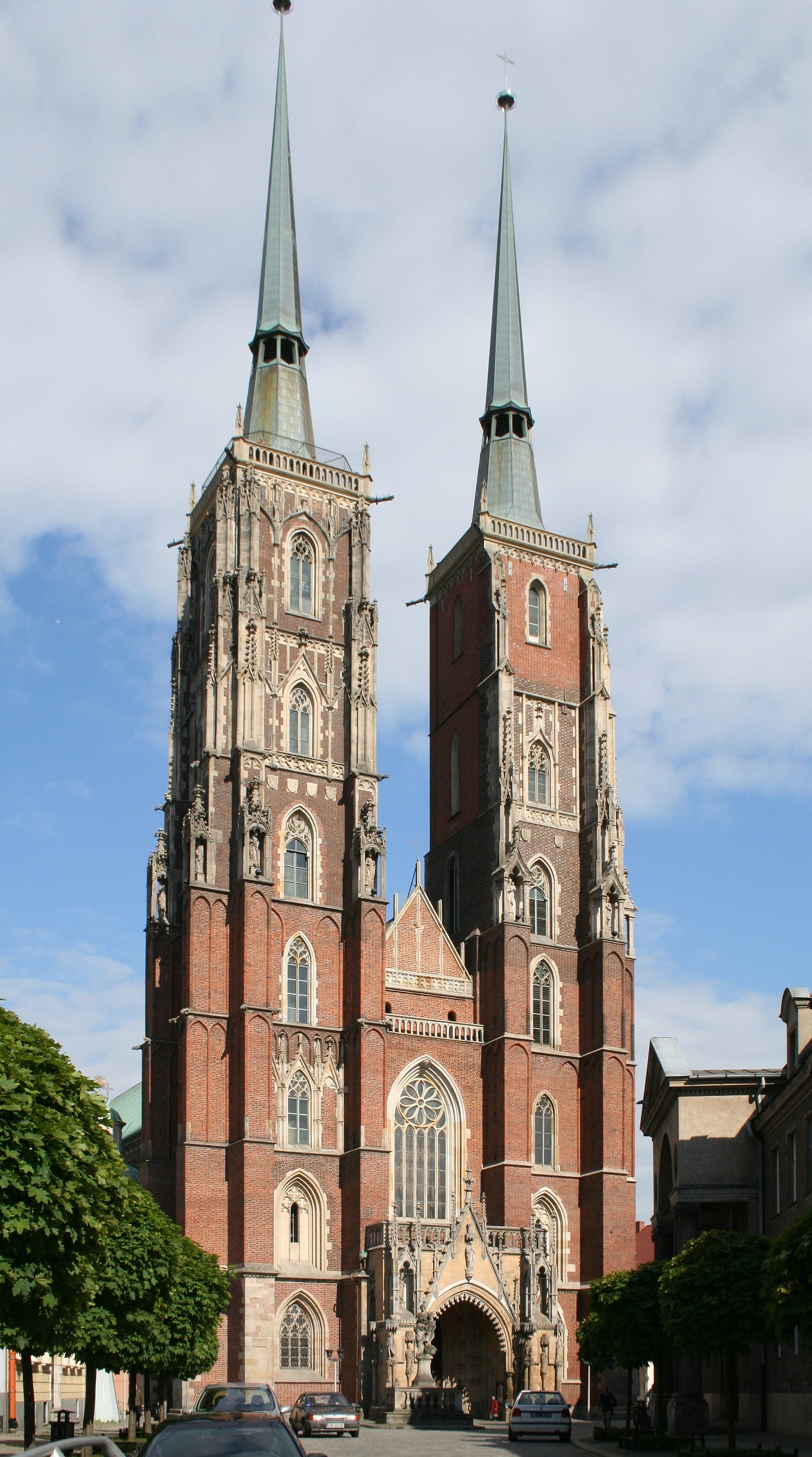
Gothic Cathedral of St. John the Baptist in Wrocław

As the disadvantages of political division were becoming increasingly apparent in various segments of society, some of the Piast dukes began to make serious efforts aimed at the reunification of the Polish state. Important among the earlier attempts were the activities of the Silesian dukes Henry I the Bearded, his son Henry II the Pious, who was killed in 1241 while fighting the Mongols at the Battle of Legnica, and Henry IV Probus. In 1295, Przemysł II of Greater Poland became the first Piast duke crowned as King of Poland since Bolesław II, but he ruled over only a part of the territory of Poland (including Gdańsk Pomerania from 1294) and was assassinated soon after his coronation. A more extensive unification of Polish lands was accomplished by a foreign ruler, Wenceslaus II of Bohemia of the Přemyslid dynasty, who married Przemysł's daughter Richeza and became King of Poland in 1300. Wenceslaus's heavy-handed policies soon caused him to lose whatever support he had earlier in his reign; he died in 1305.

An important factor in the unification process was the Polish Church, which remained a single ecclesiastical province throughout the fragmentation period. Archbishop Jakub Świnka of Gniezno was an ardent proponent of Poland's reunification; he performed the crowning ceremonies for both Przemysł II and Wenceslaus II. Świnka supported Władysław I Łokietek at various stages of the duke's career.

=== Culture ===
Culturally, the social impact of the Church was considerably broader in the 13th century, as networks of parishes were established and cathedral-type schools became more common. The Dominicans and the Franciscans were the leading monastic orders at this time, and they interacted closely with the general population. A proliferation of narrative annals characterised the period, as well as other written records, laws and documents. More of the clergy were of local origin; others were expected to know the Polish language. Wincenty Kadłubek, the author of an influential chronicle, was the most recognised representative in the intellectual sphere. Perspectiva, a treatise on optics by Witelo, a Silesian monk, was one of the finest achievements of medieval science. The construction of churches and castles in the Gothic architecture style predominated in the 13th century; native elements in art forms were increasingly important, with significant advances taking place in agriculture, manufacturing and crafts.

== 14th century ==
=== The reunited kingdom of the last Piast rulers; Jewish settlement ===
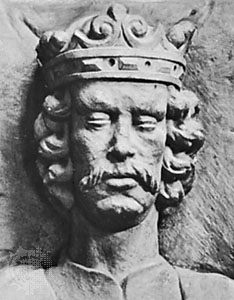
A fragment of a sandstone sarcophagus depicting Władysław I Łokietek in Wawel Cathedral, Kraków

Władysław I Łokietek and his son Casimir III, "the Great" were the last two rulers of the Piast dynasty, who ruled over a reunified kingdom of Poland in the 14th century. Their rule was not a return to the Polish state as it existed before the period of fragmentation, because of the loss of internal cohesion and territorial integrity. The regional Piast princes remained strong, and for economic and cultural reasons, some of them gravitated toward Poland's neighbors. The kingdom lost Pomerania and Silesia, the most highly developed and economically important regions of the original ethnically Polish lands, which left half of the Polish population outside the kingdom's borders. The western losses had to do with the failure of the unification efforts undertaken by the Silesian Piast dukes and the German expansion processes. These included the Piast principalities developing (or falling into) dependencies in respect to the German political structures, settler colonisation and gradual Germanisation of the Polish ruling circles. The lower Vistula was controlled by the Teutonic Order. Masovia was not to be fully incorporated into the Polish state in the near future. Casimir stabilised the western and northern borders, tried to regain some of the lost territories, and partially compensated the losses by new eastern expansion that placed within his kingdom regions that were East Slavic, thus ethnically non-Polish.

Despite the territorial truncation, 14th century Poland experienced a period of accelerated economic development and increasing prosperity. This included further expansion and modernisation of agricultural settlements, the development of towns and their greater role in briskly growing trade, mining and metallurgy. A great monetary reform was implemented during the reign of Casimir III.

Jewish settlement has been taking place in Poland since very early times. In 1264, Duke Bolesław the Pious of Greater Poland granted the privileges of the Statute of Kalisz, which specified a broad range of freedoms of religious practices, movement, and trading for the Jews. It also created a legal precedent for the official protection of Jews from local harassment and exclusion. The act exempted the Jews from enslavement or serfdom and was the foundation of future Jewish prosperity in the Polish kingdom; it was later followed by many other comparable legal pronouncements. Following a series of expulsions of Jews from Western Europe, Jewish communities were established in Kraków, Kalisz and elsewhere in western and southern Poland in the 13th century. Another series of communities was established at Lviv, Brest-Litovsk and Grodno further east in the 14th century. King Casimir received Jewish refugees from Germany in 1349.

=== The reign of Władysław I Łokietek (1305–1333) ===
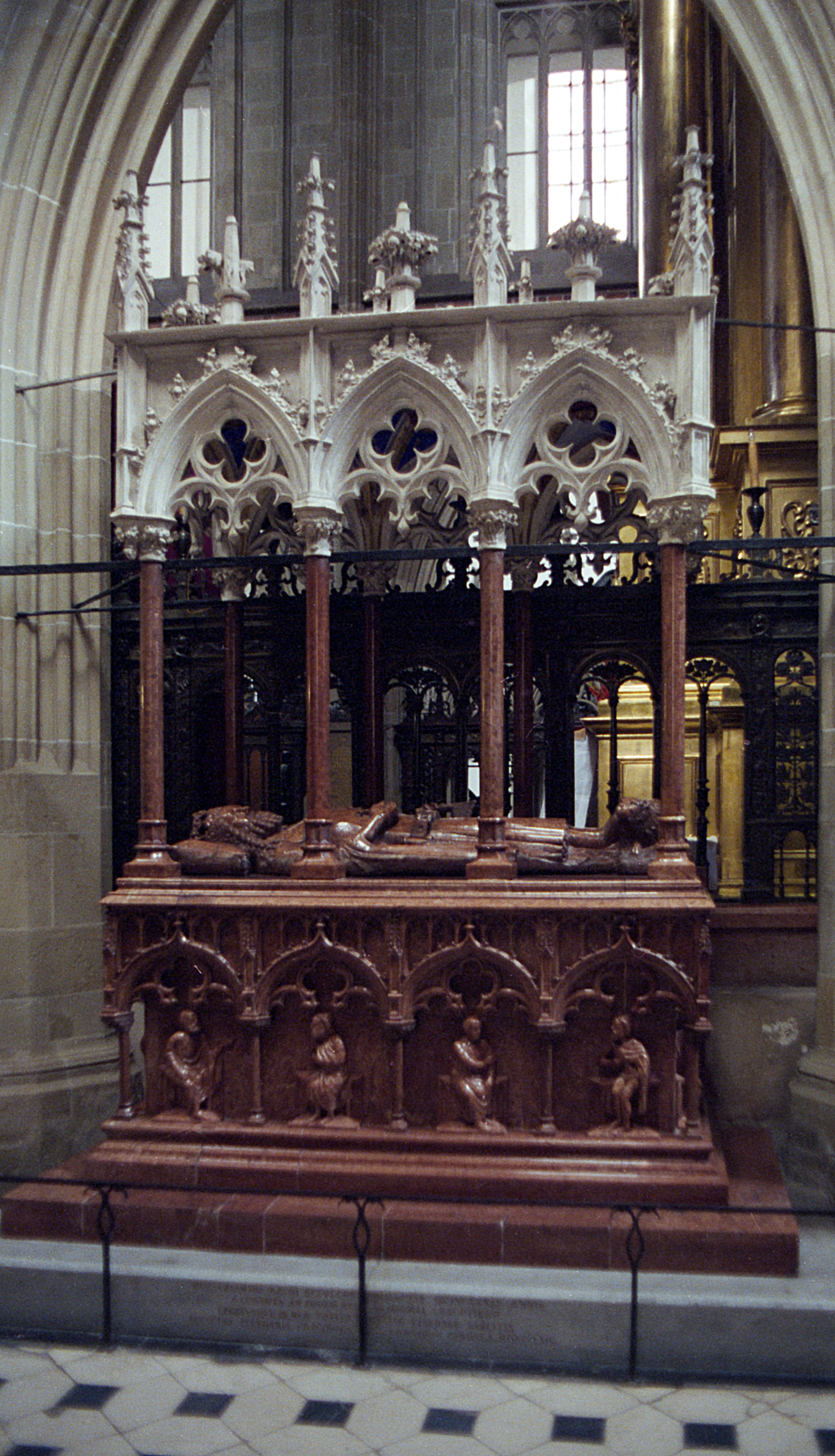
Sarcophagus of Casimir the Great at Wawel Cathedral

Władysław I Łokietek (r. 1305–1333), who began as an obscure Piast duke from Kuyavia, pursued a lifelong, persistently challenging struggle with powerful adversaries with persistence and determination. When he died as the king of a partially reunited Poland, he left the kingdom in a precarious situation. Although the area under King Władysław's control was limited and many unresolved issues remained, he may have saved Poland's existence as a state.

Supported by his ally Charles I of Hungary, Władysław returned from exile and challenged Wenceslaus II of Bohemia and his successor Wenceslaus III of Bohemia in the period 1304–1306. Wenceslaus III's murder in 1306 terminated the Bohemian Přemyslid dynasty and its involvement in Poland. Afterwards, Władysław completed the takeover of Lesser Poland, entering Kraków, and took the lands north of there, through Kuyavia all the way to Gdańsk Pomerania. In 1308, Pomerania was conquered by the Brandenburg state. In a recovery effort, Władysław agreed to ask for help from the Teutonic Knights; the Knights brutally took over Gdańsk Pomerania and kept it for themselves.

In 1311–1312, a rebellion in Kraków instigated by the city's patrician leadership seeking rule by the House of Luxembourg was put down. This event may have had a limiting impact on the emerging political power of towns.

In 1313–1314, Władysław conquered Greater Poland. In 1320, he became the first king of Poland to be crowned in Kraków's Wawel Cathedral instead of Gniezno. The coronation was hesitantly agreed to by Pope John XXII in spite of the opposition of King John of Bohemia, who had also claimed the Polish crown. John undertook an expedition aimed at Kraków in 1327, which he was compelled to abort; in 1328, he waged a crusade against Lithuania, during which he formalised an alliance with the Teutonic Order. The Order was in a state of war with Poland from 1327 to 1332 (see Battle of Płowce). As a result, the Knights captured Dobrzyń Land and Kujawy. Władysław was helped by his alliances with Hungary (his daughter Elisabeth of Poland was married to King Charles I of Hungary in 1320) and Lithuania (in a pact of 1325 against the Teutonic State and the marriage of Władysław's son Casimir III the Great to Aldona of Lithuania, daughter of the Lithuanian ruler Gediminas). After 1329, a peace agreement with Brandenburg also assisted his efforts. A lasting achievement of John of Bohemia (and a great loss to Poland) was his success in forcing most of the Piast Silesian principalities, often ambivalent about their loyalties, into allegiance between 1327 and 1329.

=== The reign of Casimir III the Great (1333–1370) ===
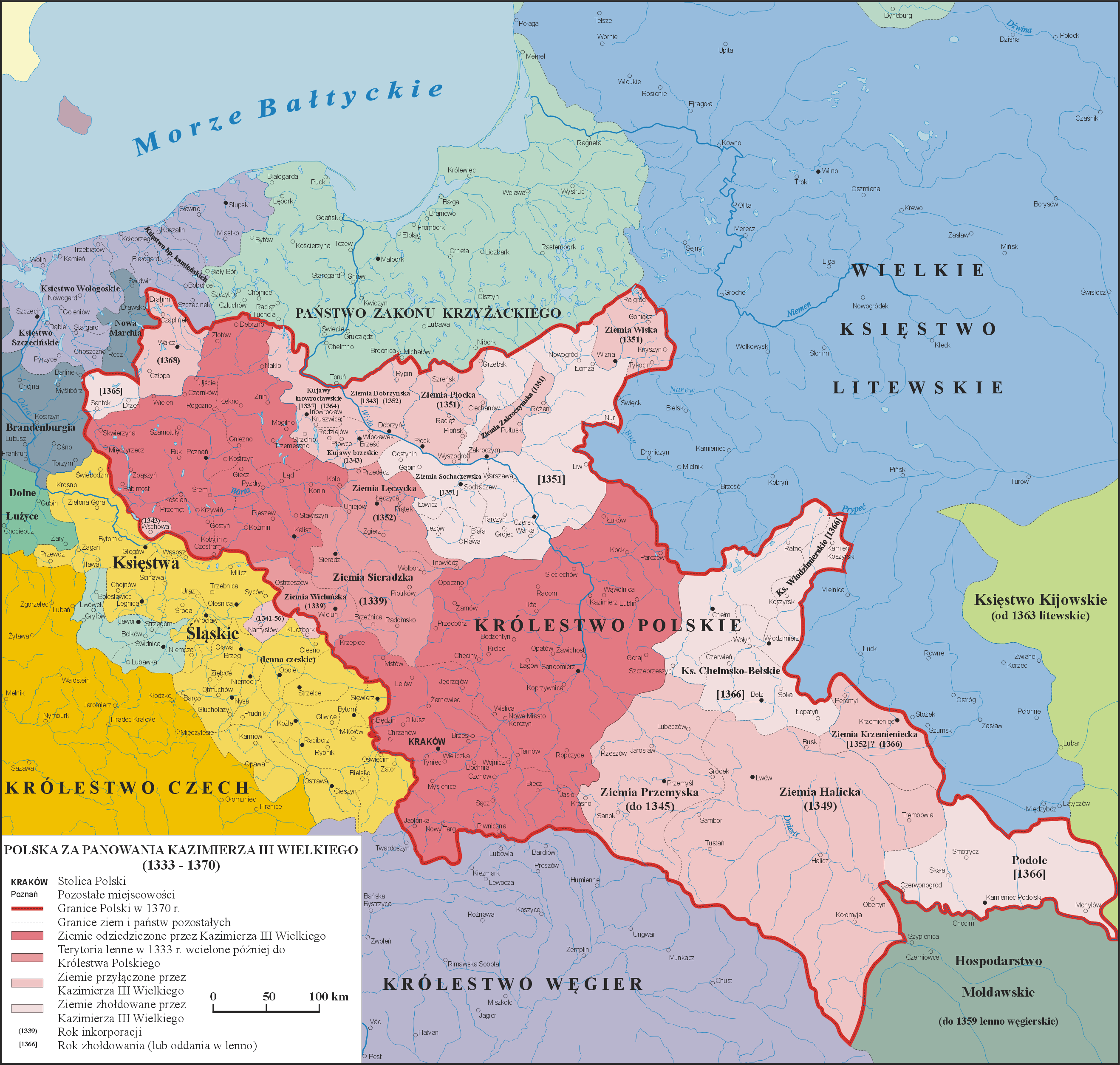
Poland during the rule of Casimir III (1333–1370) is shown within the red line; Silesia (yellow) and Pomerania (purple) were lost, while the kingdom had expanded to the southeast.

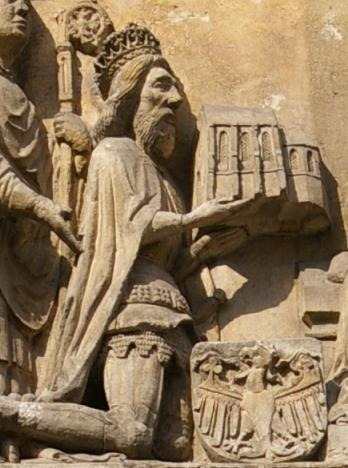
Foundation of the Collegiate church in Wiślica by Casimir III the Great

After the death of Władysław I, the old monarch's 23-year-old son became King Casimir III, later known as Casimir the Great (r. 1333–1370). Unlike his father, the new king demonstrated no attraction for the hardships of military life. Casimir's contemporaries did not give him much of a chance of overcoming the country's mounting difficulties or succeeding as a ruler. But from the beginning, Casimir acted prudently, and in 1335, he purchased the claims of King John of Bohemia to the Polish throne. In 1343, Casimir settled several high-level arbitration disputes with the Teutonic Order by a territorial compromise that culminated in the Treaty of Kalisz of 1343. Dobrzyń Land and Kuyavia were recovered by Casimir. At that time, Poland started to expand to the east and, through a series of military campaigns between 1340 and 1366, Casimir annexed the Halych–Volodymyr area of Rus'. The town of Lwów, which attracted newcomers of several nationalities, was granted municipal rights in 1356, and had thus begun its career as Lwów, the main Polish centre in the midst of a Rus' Orthodox population. Supported by Hungary, the Polish king in 1338 promised the Hungarian ruling house the Polish throne in the event he dies without male heirs.

Casimir, who formally gave up his rights to several Silesian principalities in 1339, unsuccessfully tried to recover the region by conducting military activities against the House of Luxembourg (the rulers of Bohemia) between 1343 and 1348, but then blocked the attempted separation of Silesia from the Archdiocese of Gniezno by Holy Roman Emperor Charles IV. Later, until his death, he pursued the Polish claim to Silesia legally by petitioning the pope; his successors did not continue his efforts.

Allied with Denmark and Western Pomerania (Gdańsk Pomerania was granted to the Order as an "eternal charity"), Casimir was able to impose some corrections on the western border. In 1365, Drezdenko and Santok became Poland's fiefs, while the Wałcz district was taken outright in 1368. The latter action severed the land connection between Brandenburg and the Teutonic state and connected Poland with Farther Pomerania.

Casimir the Great considerably solidified the country's position in both foreign and domestic affairs. Domestically, he integrated and centralized the reunited Polish state and helped develop what was considered the "Crown of the Polish Kingdom": the state within its actual boundaries, as well as past or potential boundaries. Casimir established or strengthened kingdom-wide institutions (such as the powerful state treasury) independent of the regional, class, or royal court-related interests. Internationally, the Polish king was very active diplomatically; he cultivated close contacts with other European rulers and was a staunch defender of the interests of the Polish state. In 1364, he sponsored the Congress of Kraków, in which a number of monarchs participated, which was concerned with the promotion of peaceful cooperation and political balance in Central Europe.

=== The reign of Louis I and Jadwiga (1370–1399) ===
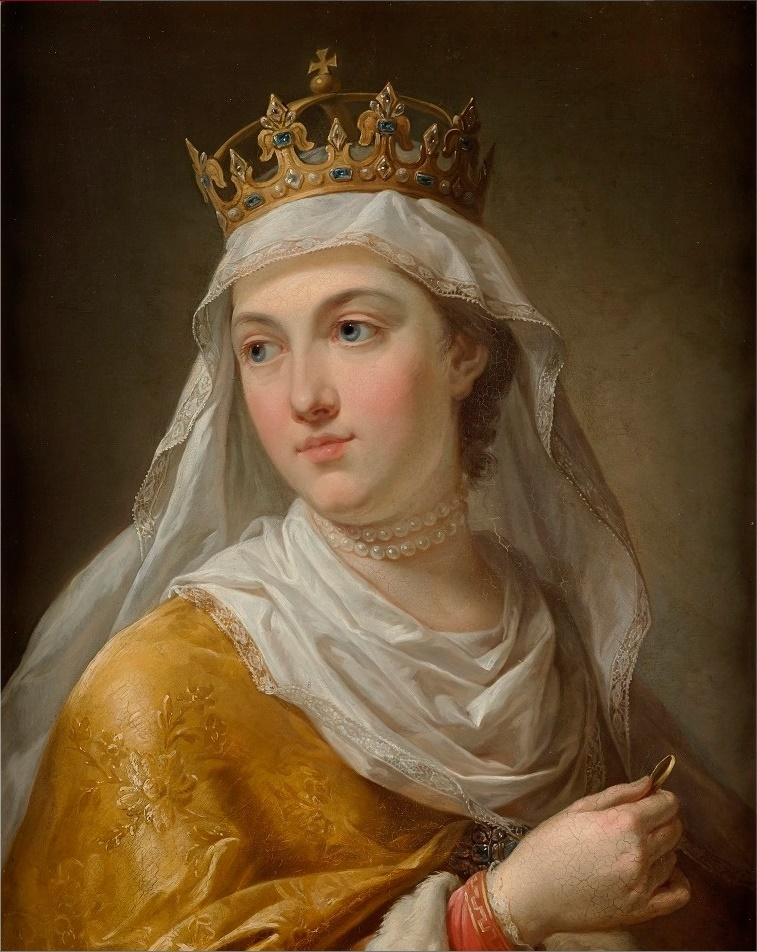
Queen Jadwiga was the great-granddaughter of Władysław I Łokietek.

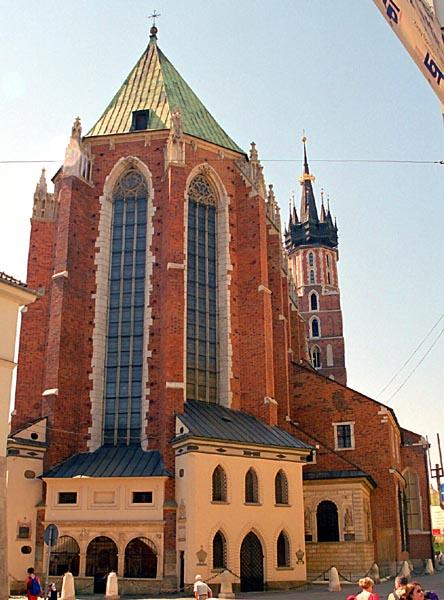
St. Mary's Church in Kraków

Immediately after Casimir's death in 1370, the heirless king's nephew Louis of Hungary of the Capetian House of Anjou assumed the Polish throne. As Casimir's actual commitment to the Anjou succession seemed problematic from the beginning (in 1368, the Polish king adopted his grandson, Casimir IV, Duke of Pomerania), Louis engaged in succession negotiations with Polish knights and nobility starting in 1351. They supported him, exacting in return further guarantees and privileges for themselves; the formal act was negotiated in Buda in 1355. After his coronation, Louis returned to Hungary; he left his mother and Casimir's sister Elizabeth in Poland as regents.

With the death of Casimir the Great, the period of hereditary (Piast) monarchy in Poland came to an end. The land owners and nobles did not want a strong monarchy; a constitutional monarchy was established between 1370 and 1493 that included the beginning of the general sejm, the dominant bicameral parliament of the future.

During the reign of Louis I, Poland formed a Polish-Hungarian union. In the pact of 1374 (the Privilege of Koszyce), the Polish nobility was granted extensive concessions and agreed to extend the Anjou succession to Louis' daughters, as Louis had no sons. Louis' neglect of Polish affairs resulted in the loss of Casimir's territorial gains, including Halych Rus', which was recovered by Queen Jadwiga in 1387. In 1396, Jadwiga and her husband Jagiełło (Jogaila) forcefully annexed the central Polish lands, separating Lesser Poland from Greater Poland, previously granted by King Louis to his Silesian Piast ally Duke Vladislaus II of Opole.

The Hungarian-Polish union lasted for twelve years and ended in war. After Louis' death in 1382 and a power struggle that resulted in the Greater Poland Civil War, the Polish nobility decided that Jadwiga, Louis' youngest daughter, should become the next "King of Poland"; Jadwiga arrived in 1384 and was crowned at the age of eleven. The failure of the union of Poland and Hungary paved the way for the union of Lithuania and Poland.

=== Culture ===
In the 14th century, many large scale brick building projects were undertaken during Casimir's reign, including the construction of Gothic churches, castles, urban fortifications and homes of wealthy city residents. The most notable examples of architecture from the medieval period in Poland are the many churches representing the Polish Gothic style; medieval sculpture, painting and ornamental smithery are best revealed in the furnishings of churches and liturgical items. Polish law was first codified in the Statutes of Casimir the Great (the Piotrków–Wiślica Statutes) from 1346 to 1362. Accordingly, conflict resolution relied on legal proceedings domestically, while bilateral or multilateral negotiations and treaties were increasingly important in international relations. By this time, the network of cathedral and parish schools had become well developed. In 1364, Casimir the Great established the University of Kraków, the second oldest university in Central Europe. While many still traveled to Southern and Western Europe for university studies, the Polish language, along with the predominant Latin, became increasingly more common in written documents. The Holy Cross Sermons (c. early 14th century) constitute possibly the oldest extant Polish prose manuscript.

== See also ==
- Piast Concept
- Poland in the Early Middle Ages
- History of Poland during the Jagiellonian dynasty
- Slavery in Poland
