= Slavery in Poland =

Slavery in Poland existed on the territory of the Kingdom of Poland during the rule of the Piast dynasty in the Middle Ages. It continued to exist in various forms until late in the 14th century when it was supplanted by the institution of serfdom, which has often been considered a form of modified slavery.

== Terminology ==
Polish literature refers to this group of people as "unfree people" (Polish: ludzie niewolni, Latin: servi, ancillae, familia) rather than as slaves (niewolnicy).

== History ==
The institution of slavery as practiced in the Polish territories during the Early Middle Ages played a lesser economic or cultural role than in other states such as Roman Empire where slavery played a crucial role in keeping its economy alive. It existed on the territory of Kingdom of Poland during the times of the Piast dynasty; with the number of slaves rising significantly when Polish state was established, as most of the slaves were owned by the king.

According to Samuel Augustus Mitchell, non-free people were emancipated in Poland in 1347 under the Statutes of Casimir the Great issued in Wiślica. Although there are indications that some form of slavery, in practice and law, continued at least till the end of the 14th century. Throughout the remaining history of feudal Poland, particularly in the Polish–Lithuanian Commonwealth, much of the peasantry was subject to serfdom, which was often likened to slavery. Serfdom was abolished in Poland in the 19th century during the times of the partitions of Poland.

== Role in the Saqaliba slave trade ==
Poland and the pre-unification Polish Slavs were involved in the medieval Prague slave trade both as a slave source area as well as an area of active slave trade by the Poles themselves.

In the Middle ages, Prague was known in all Europe as a major slave trade center. Captives sold as slaves via Prague were supplied by several routes. The vast majority of slaves came from the area of what was later to become Poland.

=== Dukes of Bohemia ===
The armies of the Dukes of Bohemia captured pagan Slavs from the east in expeditions to the lands later known as Poland to supply the slave market, which brought considerable profit to the Dukes.

Several sources from the 10th century mentioned how the Dukes were involved in supplying the Prague slave market and that the slaves normally came from lands corresponding to what later corresponded to southern Poland and western Ukraine.

The Dukes of Bohemia, particularly Boleslaus I (r. 935–972) and Boleslaus II (r. 972–999), regularly provided the Prague slave market with new pagan captives from expeditions to the northeast.

=== Vikings ===
The Vikings acted as suppliers for slaves for the Prague slave trade in the West, as well as for the Kievan Rus' slave trade in the East.

The Vikings were known to be suppliers of slaves to the Islamic market via other routes. People taken captive during the Vikings raids in Western Europe could be sold to Moorish Spain via the Dublin slave trade or transported via the Volga trade route to Russia, where slaves were sold to Muslim merchants in the Khazar Kaghanate, and Volga Bulgaria and from there by caravan to Khwarazm and finally to the Abbasid Caliphate via the Samanid slave market in Central Asia.

While the slaves sold by the Vikings via the eastern route could be Christian Western Europeans, the slaves provided by the Vikings to the slave route of Prague-Magdeburg-Verdun were Pagan Slavs, who in contrast to Christians were legitimate for other Christians to enslave and sell as slaves to Muslims; according to Liutprand of Cremona, these slaves were trafficked to slavery in al-Andalus via Verdun, were some of them were selected to undergo castration to become eunuchs for the Muslim slave market in al-Andalus.

=== Poles ===
Slaves were also provided by the Slavs themselves as war captives during the unification of Poland under Mieszko I. To sustain this military machine and meet other state expenses, large amounts of revenue were necessary. Greater Poland had some natural resources used for trade, such as fur, hide, honey and wax, but those surely did not provide enough income. According to Ibrahim ibn Yaqub, Prague in Bohemia, a city built of stone, was the main center for the exchange of trading commodities in this part of Europe.

From Kraków, the Slavic traders brought tin, salt, amber, and other products they had, most importantly slaves; Muslim, Jewish, Hungarian, and other traders were the buyers of the Prague slave market. The Life of St. Adalbert, written at the end of the 10th century by John Canaparius, records the fate of many Christian slaves sold in Prague as the main curse of the time. Dragging of shackled slaves is shown as a scene in the 12th-century bronze Gniezno Doors. It may well be that the territorial expansion financed itself by being the source of loot, of which the captured local people were the most valuable part. The scale of the human trade practice is arguable, however, because much of the population from the defeated tribes was resettled for agricultural work or in the near-gord settlements, where they could serve the victors in various capacities and thus contribute to the economic and demographic potential of the state. Considerable increase of population density was characteristic of the newly established states in Eastern and Central Europe. The slave trade being insufficient to meet all revenue needs, the Piast state had to look for other options.

Mieszko thus strove to subdue Pomerania at the Baltic coast. The area was the site of wealthy trade emporia, frequently visited by traders, especially from the east, west and north. Mieszko had every reason to believe that great profits would have resulted from his ability to control the rich seaports situated on long distance trade routes such as Wolin, Szczecin, and Kołobrzeg.

=== The end ===
The saqaliba slave trade from Prague to al-Andalus via France ended when lost its religious legitimacy when the pagan Slavs of the north started to gradually adopt Christianity from the late 10th century, which made them out of bounds for Christian Bohemia to enslave and sell to Muslim al-Andalus. The Prague slave trade was not able to legitimately supply their slave pool after the Slavs gradually adopted Christianity from the late 10th century onward.

== Crimean slave trade ==
Political map of Black Sea region around 1600.

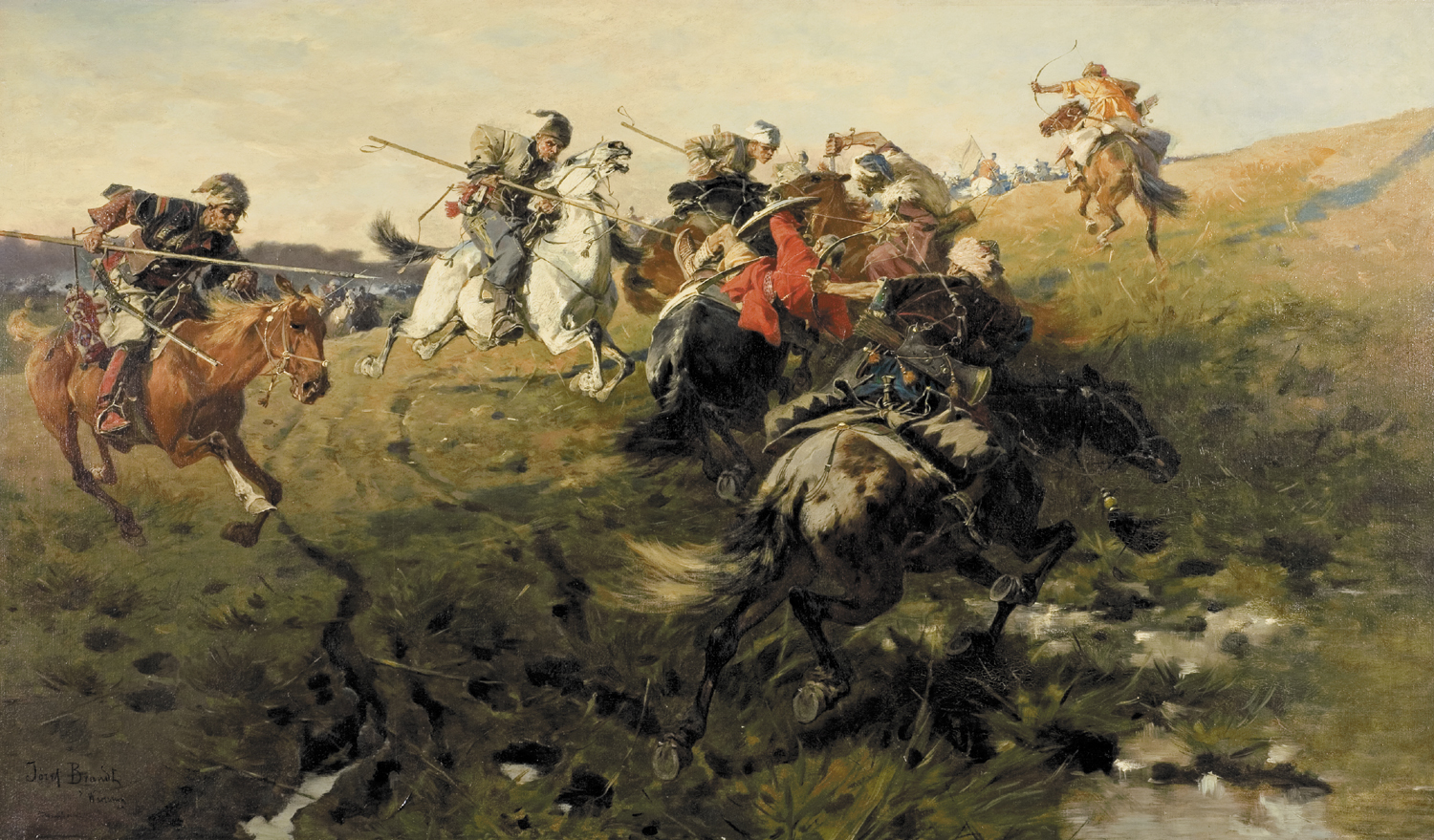
Skirmish Between Cossacks and Tatars.

Poland and Lithuania came to play an important role during late middle ages and the early modern period as a slave source for the infamous Crimean slave trade.

During the Early Modern age the Crimean Khanate (1441–1783) was a major center of the international slave trade. The Crimean slave trade was the main source of income of the Khanate, and one of the biggest supply sources to slavery in the Ottoman Empire. The Crimean slave trade in Eastern Europe, and the Barbary slave trade in West and South Europe, were the two main sources of European slaves to the Ottoman Empire.

During this period the Crimea was the base of the Crimean–Nogai slave raids in Eastern Europe, and European slaves were trafficked to the Middle East via the Crimea. The Nogai Horde were vassals of the Crimean Khanate and economically dependent upon the slave trade, and performed the slave raids independently, or in collaboration with the Crimean Tatars, who were dependent on slave trade and slave labor on their estates.

In this time period, Poland and Lithuania were united, and Ukraine was a part of Poland–Lithuania. The slaves were captured in southern Russia, Poland–Lithuania, Moldavia, Wallachia, and Circassia by Tatar horsemen in a trade known as the "harvesting of the steppe". Slave raids were regularly conducted by the Nogai Horde and or the Crimean Tatars toward Russia, Poland–Lithuania, and the Caucasus twice every year; during the harvest and during the winter for centuries. The first major Crimean–Nogai raid were conducted toward South Eastern Poland in 1468, and the last slave raid was conducted in 1769, during the Russo-Turkish War (1768–1774), when 20,000 people were taken captive.

A Ukrainian folk song remembered the despair and devastation of the slave raids:

"The fires are burning behind the river.
The Tatars are dividing their captives.
Our village is burnt and our property plundered.
Old mother is sabred and my dear is taken into captivity."

The majority of the slaves captured were forced into slave caravans by land and then by sea to the city of Caffa, which was an Ottoman province in the Crimean Khanate and a major center of the Crimean slave trade. Polish-Lithuanian captives were marched down to the port of Ochakiv, where they were loaded on to slave ships and trafficked to Caffa in the Crimea. There were reportedly always around 30,000 slaves in Caffa. The Lithuanian Mikhalon Litvin referred to Caffa in the 16th century as: "not a town, but an abyss into which our blood is pouring". From Caffa, the captives were distributed between the Ottomans and the Crimean Tatars, and some were distributed to the smaller slave markets in the Crimean Khanate, while the rest were sold in Caffa and trafficked to the rest of the Ottoman Empire and the Islamic Middle East.

It is not documented exactly how many raids were conducted, where and how, and exactly the number of people abducted between the late 15th century and the late 18th century. Between 1474 and 1569, 75 major slave raids are estimated to have been conducted toward Polish–Lithuanian territory. During the year of 1676 alone, circa 40,000 people are estimated to have been abducted from the territory of Volhynia-Podolia-Galicia, and at least 20,000 people are estimated to have been abducted from the territory of Poland–Lithuania every year between 1500 and 1644, or at least one million people. Among the most known victims of the Crimean slave raids from Poland were Roxelana. Polish was such a common ethnicity for a slave in the Crimea Khanate, that the Polish language was the second language in the Crimea. A Polish proverb described death as a better fate than being captured by a slave raid:

"O how much better to lie on one's bier, than to be captive on the way to Tatary".

The Crimean slave trade is estimated to have been as large in numbers as the Transatlantic slave trade until the 18th century, when the Atlantic slave trade exploded and surpassed the Crimean slave trade in numbers. In 1783, the Crimean Khanate was dissolved after the Russian annexation of Crimea, which finally eliminated the Crimean slave trade.

== Features and slavery laws ==
The slaves came primarily from the ranks of prisoners of war, and were treated as a commodity destined mostly for the largest slave market of its age—the Prague slave trade.

Later, between the 11th and 12th century, ransom was popularised due to acceptance of Christianity, but it covered prisoners of prominence mostly. Some people could also become enslaved due to their inability to pay off their debts, and occasionally enslavement was used as substitute to a death sentence.

Children of niewolni was in default categorized as part of the slavery class, since they belonged to the king or knights.

Niewolni owned by the king were organized in units of tens and hundreds. Those who were not owned by the monarch were among the few in the Kingdom of Poland that could not rely on royal justice.

Niewolni had a limited right to relocate themselves, and could own possessions. Over time, their numbers decreased due to various reasons. Some of them were able to escape and some were favored as their owners saw them to be more profitable when they are used as peasants (Polish: czeladź, Latin: servi casati) rather than servants. Czeladź would have their own house, and would be little different from regular peasants or serfs.

== Present day ==
Slavery is illegal in Poland. Poland is part of the European G6 Initiative Against Human Trafficking. Contemporary slavery however still persists in Poland, just as it does in the rest of the world. According the Global Slavery Index, there were 128,000 people living in the condition of modern slavery in Poland as of 2019.

Types of slavery found in Poland include forced labor, forced begging, and forced criminality. Sectors of the Polish economy considered most vulnerable to slavery and other forms of exploitation include agriculture, construction, food processing, housekeeping and cleaning, although problems have also been found in the industrial production and catering sectors. Some of the people subject to forced labour in Poland were from temporary workers from North Korea. Common techniques for trafficking people into slavery from other countries include false job promises, high fees or alleged debts, rape, and withholding the person's documentation. False offers of employment are usually for sales or agricultural work. Many trafficking victims from Bulgaria and Ukraine are forced into sex slavery.

== See also ==
- Jasyr
- Saqaliba
- Slavery in medieval Europe
- Tatar slave raids in East Slavic lands
- Anti-Polish sentiment
- Second serfdom
- Serfdom in Poland
- Black Sea slave trade
