= Rolling stock of the Serbian Railways =

This is a list of rolling stock of the Serbian Railways. This company was responsible for passenger and freight railway services in Serbia till 2015. This article lists all rolling stock which belongs to its successors, Srbijavoz and Srbija Kargo.

== Electric locomotives ==
Designation	Producer	Total units	Units in service	Power output (kW)	AAR wheel arrangement	Top speed (km/h)	Years built	Image
ŽS 441	KONČAR; MIN Niš	44	29	3,800 kW	Bo'Bo'	120 km/h (140 km/h)	1969-1988	
ŽS 444	KONČAR; MIN Niš	30	23	3,800 kW	Bo'Bo'	120 km/h (140 km/h)	2004-2007	
ŽS 461	Electroputere	51	35	5,100 kW	Co'Co'	120 km/h	1972-1980	
ŽS 193	Siemens Mobility	16	16	6,400 kW	Bo'Bo'	160 km/h (200 km/h)	2018-2019	

== Diesel locomotives ==
Designation	Producer	Total units	Units in service	Power output (kW)	AAR wheel arrangement	Top speed (km/h)	Years built	Image
ŽS 621	ČMKS	17	N/A	392 kW (1,700 kW)	Bo	80 km/h	2001	
ŽS 641	Ganz-Mavag	37	11	441 kW	Bo'Bo'	80 km/h	1960-1985	
ŽS 644	MACOSA	6	2	1,230 kW	A1A-A1A	80 km/h	1974	
ŽS 661	GM-EMD; Đuro Đaković	42	23	1,454 kW	Co'Co'	114 km/h (124 km/h)	1960-1971	
ŽS 666	GM-EMD	4	2	1,845 kW	Co'Co'	122 km/h	1978	

== Electric multiple units ==
Designation	Producer	Total units	Units in service	Power output (kW)	AAR wheel arrangement	Top speed (km/h)	Years built	Image
ŽS 410	Stadler	3	3	4,000 kW	Bo'2'2'2'Bo'	200 km/h	2022	
ŽS 411 (series 0)	CRRC	5	5			200 km/h	2024-2026	
ŽS 411 (series 500)	CRRC	9 on order	0			120 km/h	2026-2027	
ŽS 412	Rīgas Vagonbūves Rūpnīca	20	14	1,360 kW	Bo'Bo'+2'2'+2'2'+Bo'Bo'	130 km/h	1980-1990s	
ŽS 413	Stadler	39	39	2,600 kW	Bo'2'2'2'Bo'	160 km/h	2014-2015, 2024	

== Diesel multiple units ==
Designation	Producer	Total units	Units in service	Power output (kW)	AAR wheel arrangement	Top speed (km/h)	Years built	Image
ŽS 710	FIAT, Kalmar Verkstad	10	N/A	420 kW	(1A)(A1)	130 km/h	1979–1981 (SJ Y1)	
ŽS 711	Metrovagonmash	39	39	2 x 350 kW	Bo'2'-2'Bo'	120 km/h	2011–2014	
