= Srbija Kargo =

Serbian railway company

Coordinates: 44°48′22.6″N 20°27′32″E

Serbia Kargo
- Native name: Србија Карго
- Type: State-owned enterprise
- Industry: Cargo rail transport
- Predecessor: Serbian Railways
- Founded: 10 August 2015; 10 years ago
- Founder: Government of Serbia
- Headquarters: Nemanjina 6, Belgrade, Serbia
- Area served: Serbia
- Key people: Miroljub Jevtić (General director)
- Services: Cargo transport
- Revenue: ▼€70.12 million (2025)
- Net income: ▼ (€12.94 million) (2025)
- Total assets: ▲€207.82 million (2025)
- Total equity: ▼€44.31 million (2025)
- Owner: Government of Serbia (100%)
- Number of employees: 1,943 (2025)
- Website: https://www.srbcargo.rs/en/
- Footnotes; Business ID: 21127116; Tax ID: 109108446

Srbija Kargo (Serbian Cyrillic: Србија Карго, Anglicized: Serbia Cargo) is the national state-owned cargo railway company of Serbia.

== History ==
In March 2015, the Government of Serbia announced its plan to establish three new railway companies, splitting the Serbian Railways state-owned company in separate businesses – passenger (Srbijavoz), cargo (Srbija Kargo) and infrastructure (Serbian Railways Infrastructure). Srbijavoz was founded on 10 August 2015, as the national passenger railway company of Serbia, after being split from the Serbian Railways, in the process of reconstruction and better optimization of business.

In May 2018, Srbija Kargo ordered eight Vectron locomotives manufactured by Siemens in Germany, worth 32 million euros. It also announced that it will overhaul its 1,100 wagons during 2018. In August 2019, Srbija Kargo announced the sale of 750 non-operational wagons worth over 2 million euros.

As of 2025, Srbija Kargo has 1,943 employees and revenue of 70.12 million euros. In June 2026, it was reported that it plans to lay off 420 employees.

== Rolling stock ==
- Electric locomotives
  - ŽS 441 with the total of: 14 units in service (21 total)
  - ŽS 444 with the total of: 23 units in service (30 total)
  - ŽS 461 with the total of: 29 units in service (45 total)
  - ŽS 193 with the total of: 16 units in service (16 total plus 16 units ordered)
- Diesel locomotives
  - ŽS 621 with the total of: 12 units in service (N/A total)
  - ŽS 641 with the total of: 11 units in service (37 total)
  - ŽS 642 with the total of: 1 unit in service (21 total)
  - ŽS 643 with the total of: 1 unit in service (11 total)
  - ŽS 644 with the total of: 2 units in service (6 total)
  - ŽS 661 with the total of: 20 units in service (41 total)
  - ŽS 666 with the total of: 2 units in service (2 total rented from Srbijavoz)
  - ŽS 734 with the total of: N/A units in service (N/A total)

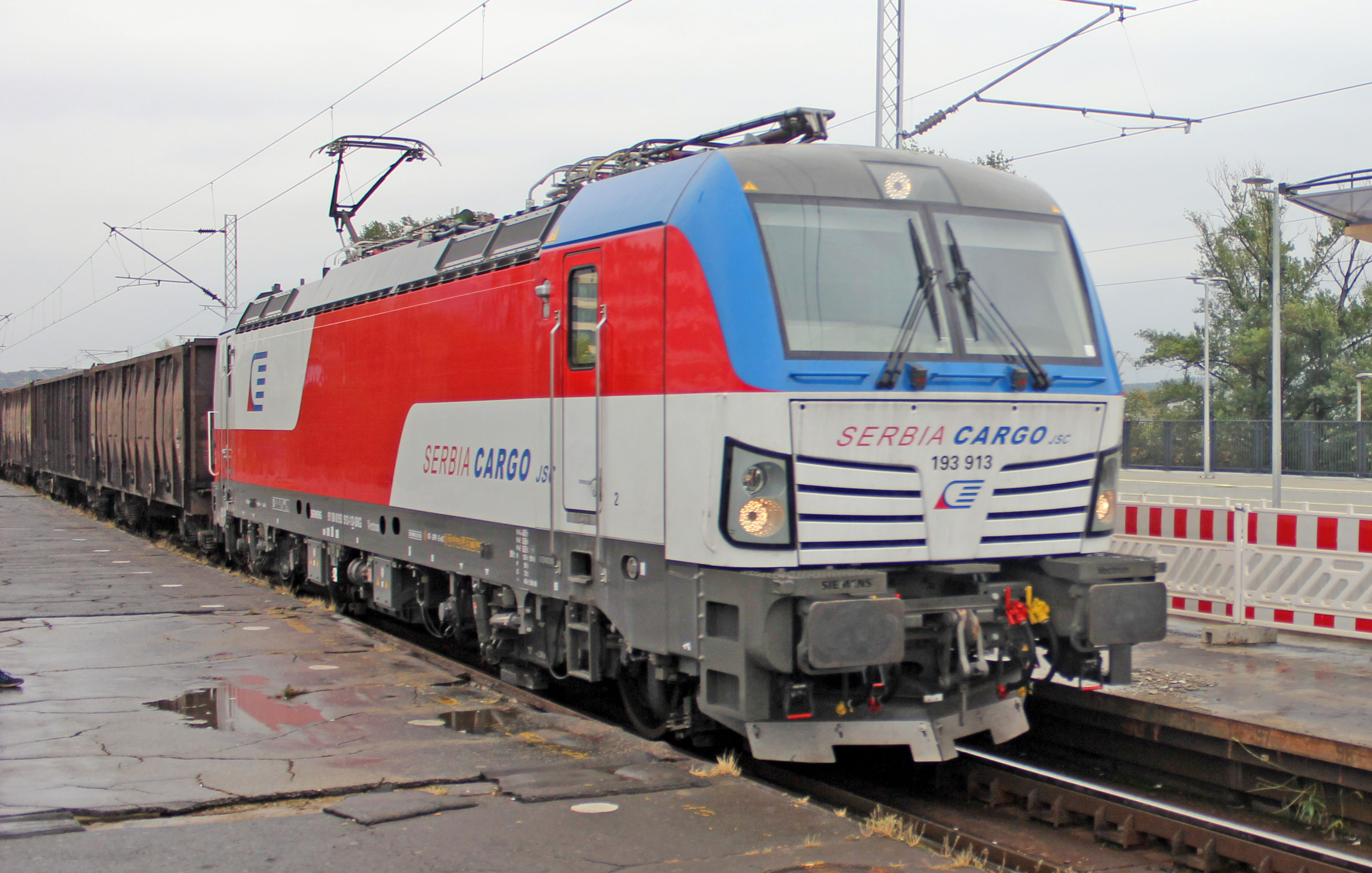
New Siemens Vectron ŽS 193 electric locomotive for Serbia Cargo

== See also ==
- Transport in Serbia
- Serbian Railways
- Serbian Railways Infrastructure
- Srbijavoz
