= Transport in Serbia and Montenegro =

The state of Serbia and Montenegro ceased to exist in 2006. The following articles cover transport in the successor states:

- Transport in Serbia
- Transport in Montenegro
