= Serbian Railways Infrastructure =

Serbian railway company

Coordinates: 44°48′22.6″N 20°27′32″E

- Native name: Инфраструктура Железнице Србије
- Romanized name: Infrastruktura Železnice Srbije
- Type: State-owned enterprise
- Industry: Railway infrastructure asset management
- Predecessor: Serbian Railways
- Founded: 10 August 2015; 11 years ago
- Headquarters: Nemanjina 6, Belgrade, Serbia
- Area served: Serbia
- Key people: mr Goran Maksić, diplomirani inženjer (General director)
- Revenue: ▲€113.89 million (2019)
- Net income: ▼ (€6.63 million) (2019)
- Total assets: ▲€2.892 billion (2019)
- Total equity: ▼€2.042 billion (2019)
- Owner: Government of Serbia (100%)
- Number of employees: 5,532 (2019)
- Website: infrazs.rs
- Footnotes; Business ID: 21127094; Tax ID: 109108420

Serbian Railways Infrastructure (Serbian: Инфраструктура Железнице Србије / Infrastruktura Železnice Srbije) is the national railway infrastructure manager of Serbia.

== History ==
In March 2015, the Government of Serbia announced its plan to establish three new railway companies, splitting the Serbian Railways state-owned company in separate businesses – passenger (Srbijavoz), cargo (Srbija Kargo) and infrastructure (Serbian Railways Infrastructure). Srbija Voz was founded on 10 August 2015, as the national passenger railway company of Serbia, after being split from the Serbian Railways, in the process of reconstruction and better optimization of business.

=== Current modernization projects ===
In February 2019, Srbijavoz temporarily suspended transportation on Belgrade–Novi Sad railway, one of the country’s most frequent passenger routes, in February 2022, due to the railway line’s reconstruction. This line is now completely reconstructed and modernized. The route is 75 km long and its reconstruction is currently extended from Novi Sad to Subotica, (border with Hungary) for the speed of 200 km/h as part of the modernization of the Belgrade-Budapest railway line.

The reconstruction and modernization of the railway lines is also planned between Belgrade and Niš for a speed of 200 km/h, Niš and Preševo for the speed of 160 km/h (border with North Macedonia) and Niš and Dimitrovgrad for the speed of 120 km/h(border with Bulgaria).

In 2017, as part of the contract with RZD, reconstruction began on the Belgrade-Novi Sad-Subotica line, on the section between Stara Pazova and Novi Sad, Belgrade-Bar line, on the section between Resnik on the outskirts of Belgrade, and Valjevo.

== See also ==
- Transport in Serbia
- Serbian Railways
- Srbija Kargo
- Srbija Voz
