= ŽS series 444 =

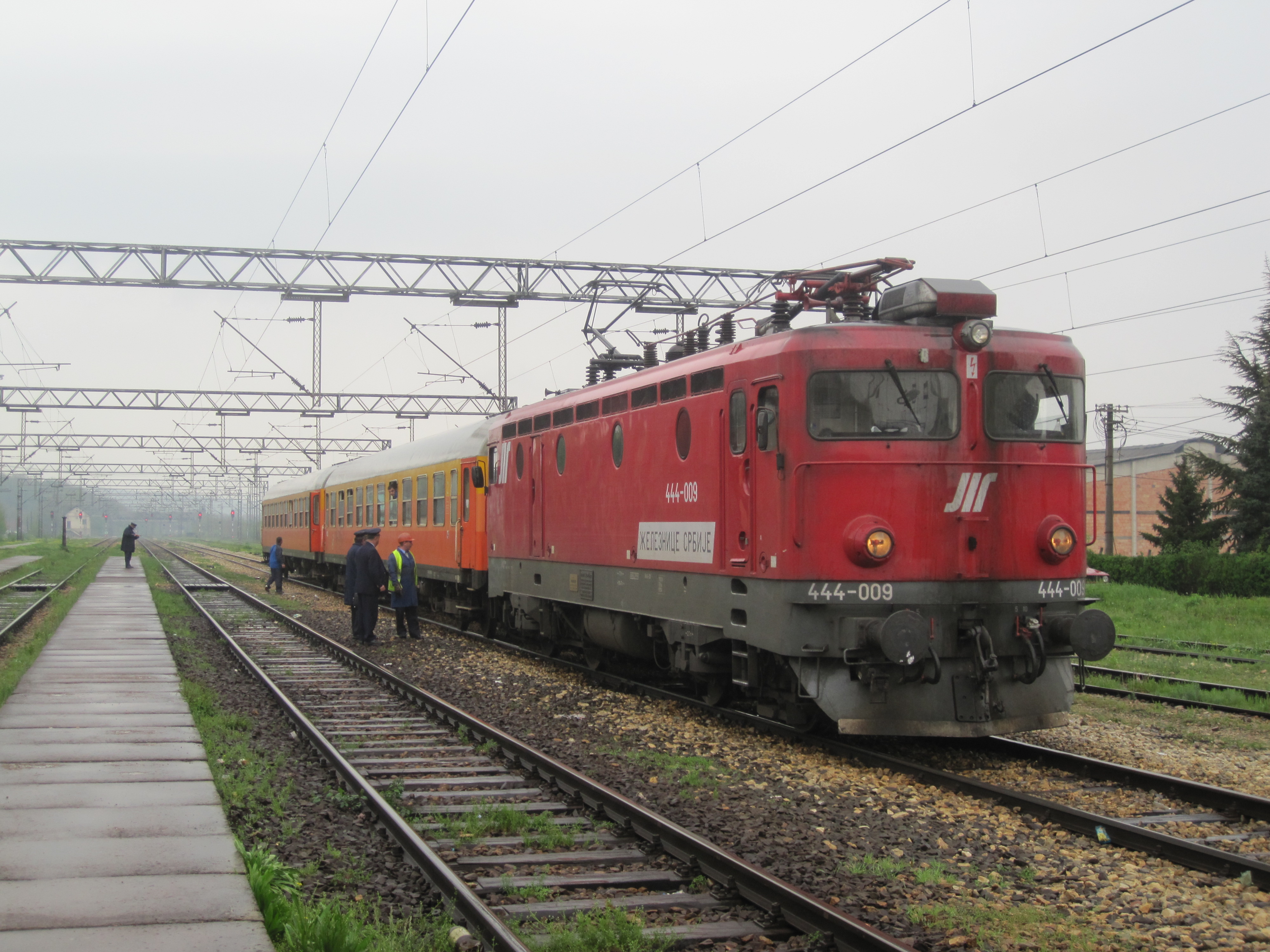
- ŽS 444 009 in Lapovo
Type and origin
- Power type: Electric
- Designer: ASEA
- Builder: Končar Group; Mašinska Industrija Niš
- Build date: 2004-2007
- Total produced: 30
Specifications
- Configuration
  - UIC: Bo′Bo′
- Gauge: 1,435 mm (4 ft 8 1/2 in) standard gauge
- Length: 15,500 mm (50 ft 10 in)
- Loco weight: 80 tonnes (79 long tons; 88 short tons)
- Electric system/s: 25 kV 50 Hz AC Catenary
- Current pickup: Pantograph
Performance figures
- Maximum speed: 120 km/h (75 mph)
Career
- Class: ŽS 444
- Nicknames: Severina
- Locale: Serbia

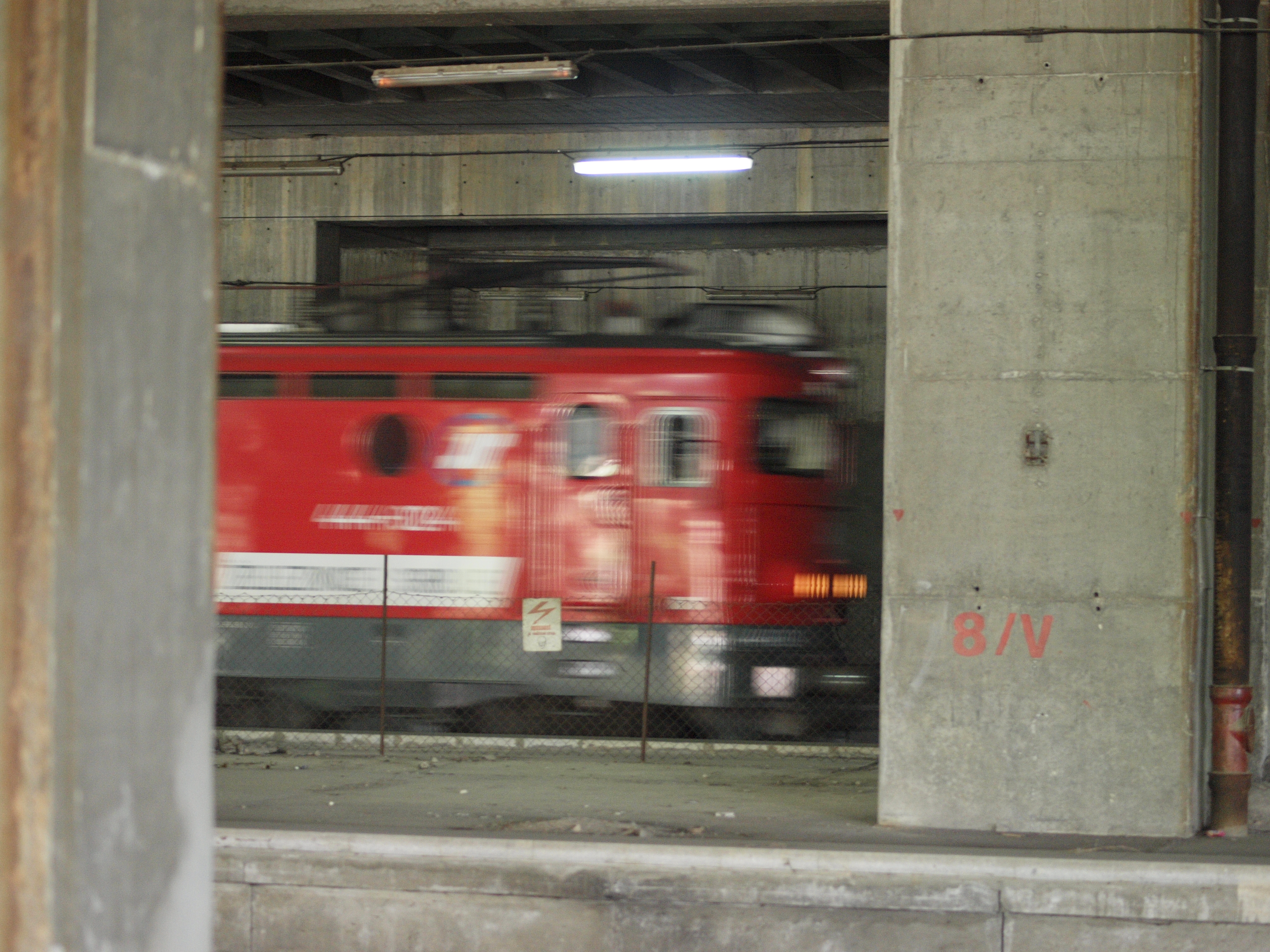
Series 444 locomotive rushing through Belgrade-Center station.

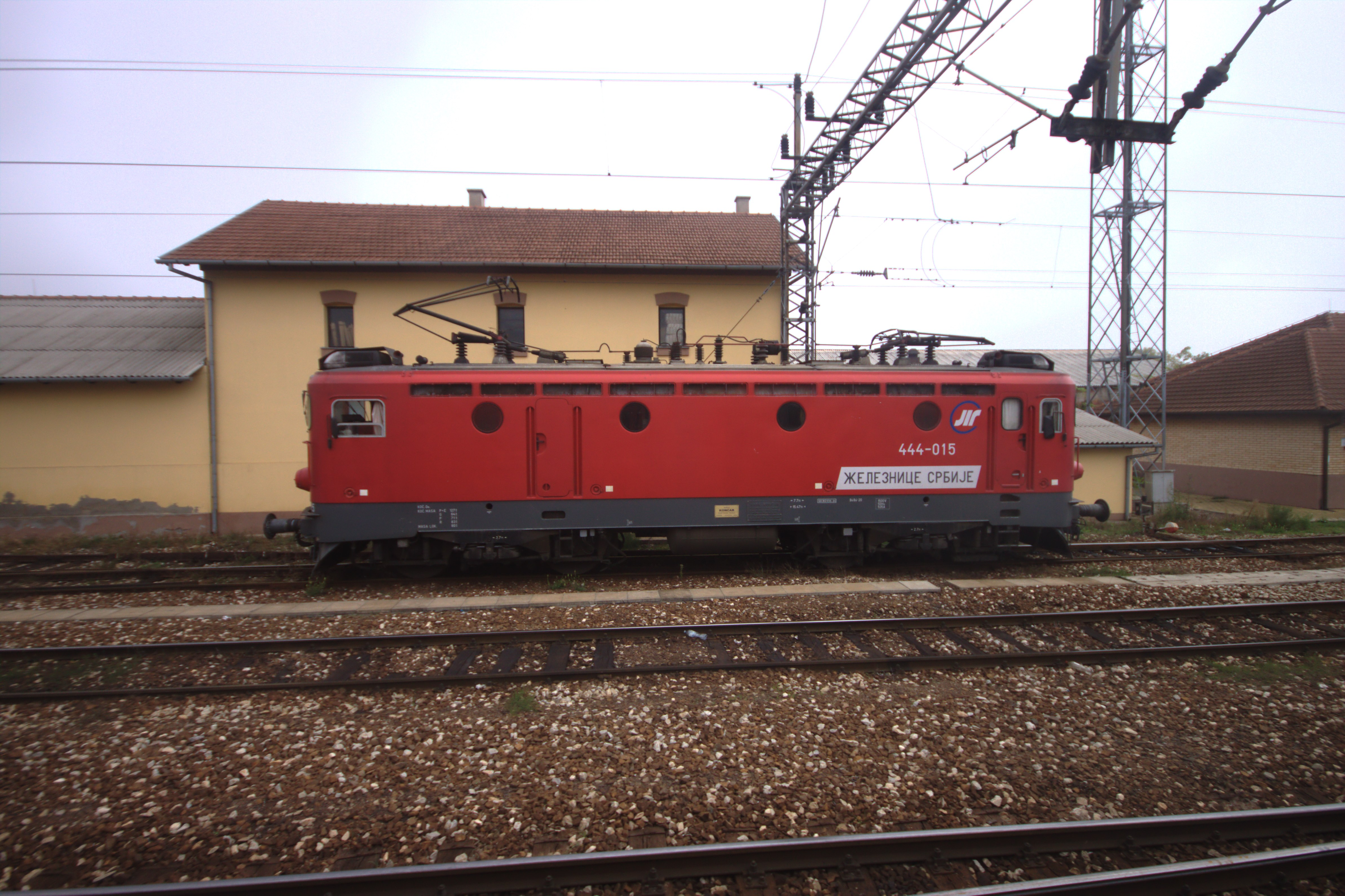
A 444 series engine near the Subotica train station

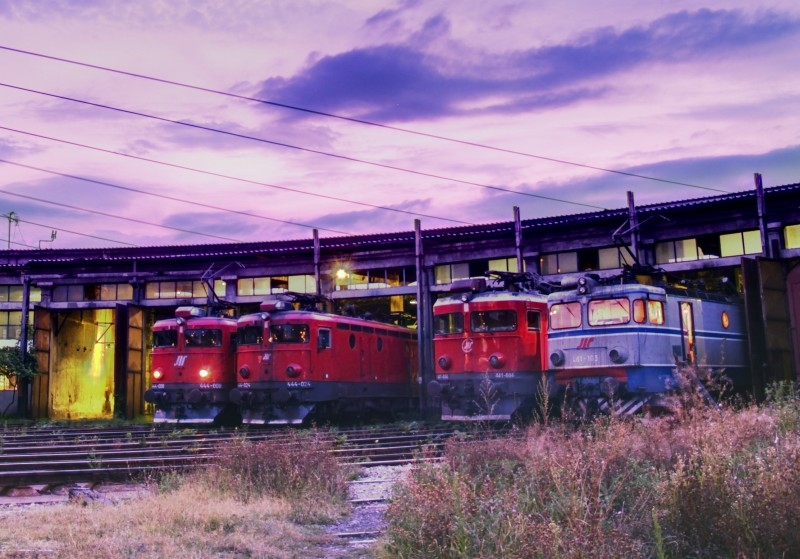
Two Serbian Railways series 444 (left), a series 441 and a series 461 electric locomotive in the old shed at Belgrade depot.

The ŽS series 444 is an electric locomotive built for Serbian Railways formed by the overhaul and modernization of 30 ŽS series 441 locomotives.

== History ==
This series is originally based on the license of the Swedish company ASEA and the SJ Rb locomotive from Sweden. The 30 electric locomotives originally from series 441 of Serbian Railways have been modified by Končar Group from Zagreb, Croatia and MIN (Mašinska Industrija Niš) from Niš, Serbia. First modified locomotive, that received new code number - ŽS series 444 (former 441-077), has become operational in summer 2004. Last modified locomotive was opened to traffic in January 2007. The modification is based on the restoration of 441 series.

== Voltage ==
This locomotive utilises 25 kV/50 Hz AC.

== Liveries ==
All class 444 locomotives of Serbian Railways have red and greyish-blue livery which is the same as for other electric locomotives operated - 441 and 461 series.

== Fleet ==
original 441 class number	No
441-077	444-001
441-322	444-002
441-068	444-003
441-525	444-004
441-424	444-005
441-088	444-006
441-326	444-007
441-064	444-008
441-078	444-009
441-313	444-010
441-317	444-011
441-087	444-012
441-413	444-013
441-062	444-014
441-311	444-015
441-060	444-016
441-314	444-017
441-319	444-018
441-421	444-019
441-530	444-020
441-043	444-021
441-419	444-022
441-310	444-023
441-412	444-024
441-523	444-025
441-415	444-026
441-010	444-027
441-532	444-028
441-324	444-029
441-011	444-030
