= Transport in Serbia =

Transport in Serbia includes transport by road, rail, air and water. Road transport incorporates a comprehensive network of major (i.e. state) and minor (i.e. municipal) roads. Rail transport is fairly developed, although dual track and electrification are not very common. Water transport revolves around river transport while air transport around country's three main international airports.

== Road transport ==
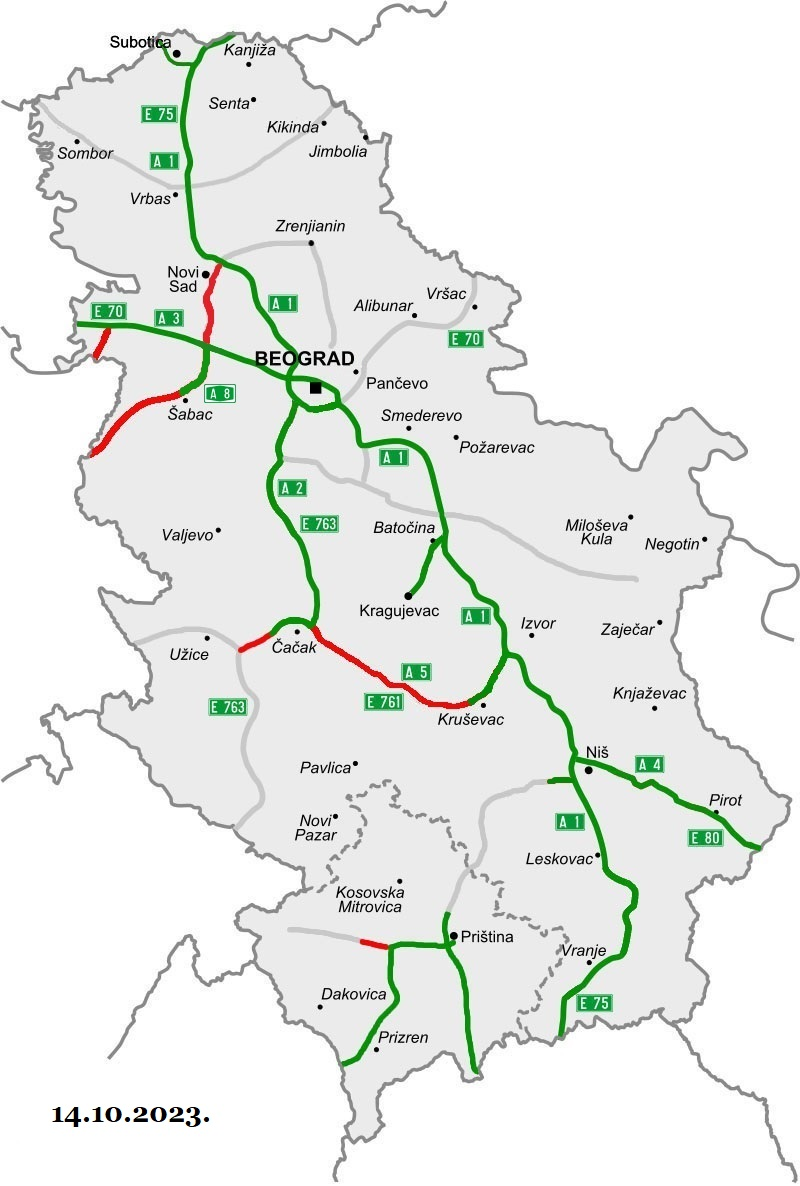
Serbian motorway network: In service Under construction Planned

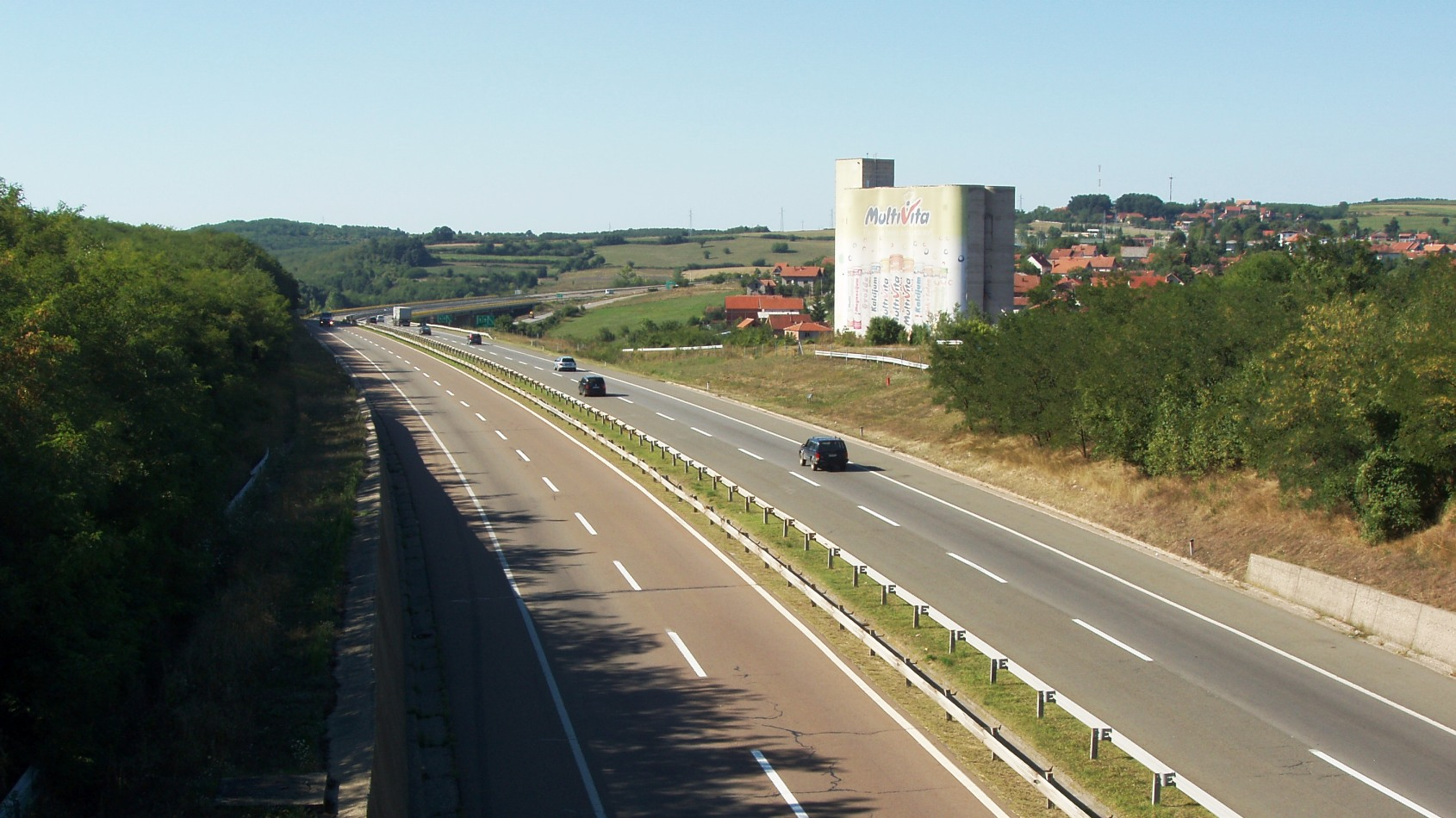
Belgrade-Niš motorway

Serbian road network carries the bulk of traffic in the country: some 55.8 million passengers (carried by buses) and 13 million tons (carried by trucks) in 2018. The road network are of comparatively lower quality to the Western European standards because of lack of financial resources for their maintenance in the last 20 years.

As of 2019, total length of roads is 45,419 km; major roads are categorized as "state roads" (with total length of 16,179 km) while minor roads are categorized as "municipal roads" (with total length of 23,780 km). By type of roads:

- motorways: 891 km
- expressways: 24 km
- other roads (paved): 29,300 km
- other roads (unpaved): 15,250 km

In 2018, statistics on registered vehicles were as follows:

- 1,999,771 passenger cars (1 per 3.5 inhabitants)
- 9,929 buses and coaches
- 223,629 lorries and vans
- 66,433 motorcycles and mopeds

Coach transport is very extensive: almost every place in the country is connected by bus, from largest cities to the villages. In addition, there are international routes to the neighboring countries (such as Bosnia and Herzegovina, Croatia, Montenegro, and North Macedonia) as well as to Western Europe (mainly to countries of Western Europe with large Serb diaspora such as Germany, Austria, France, Switzerland, etc.). Routes, both domestic and international, are served by more than hundred intercity coach services, biggest of which are Lasta and Niš-Ekspres.

=== Electric charging network ===
As of September 2019, 148 EVs were registered. Serbia has a network of over 30 charging stations (including 5 that are solar powered & 2 Tesla Super Chargers) with more planned for construction. In 2020, Serbia introduced new purchase & tax incentives for EVs & Hybrids offering up to 5000 euros to help accelerate electrification.

Serbia is also home to about 1% of global Lithium reserves, the mining & processing of which will be done in partnership with Rio Tinto who have committed $1.5 billion of investment in the country. The government is currently looking to utilize this resource to produce a major EV battery plant & Rio Tinto is helping locate a strategic partner for this venture.

=== Historical preview ===
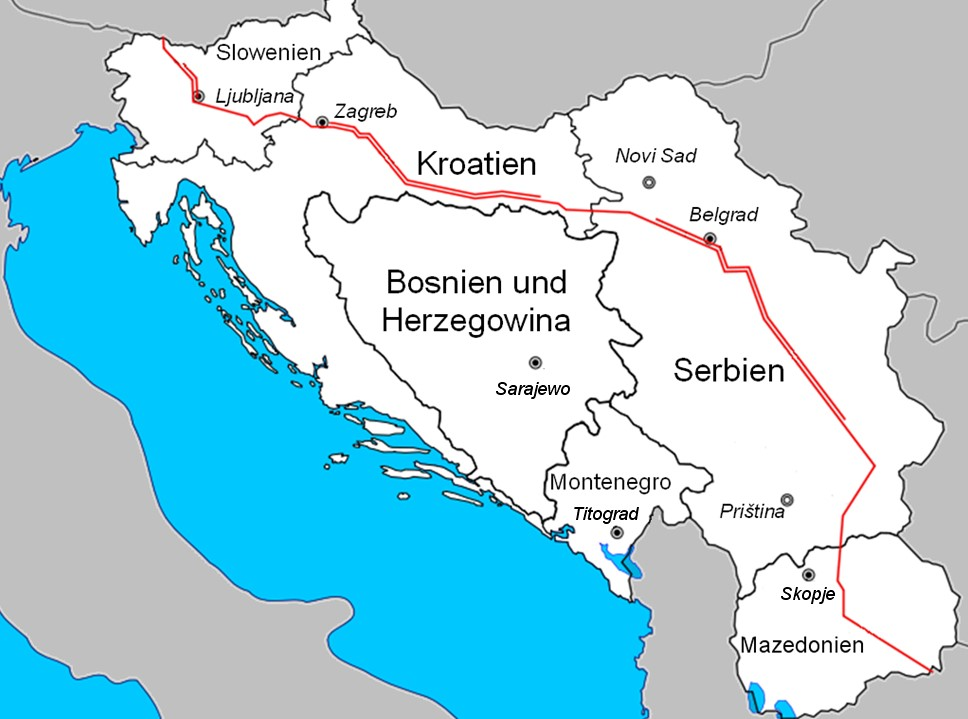
Brotherhood and Unity motorway in Yugoslavia

The Brotherhood and Unity Highway was one of the first motorways of Central-Eastern Europe. Opened as early as 1950, it became the backbone of Yugoslav road system, and linked Belgrade through Zagreb and Ljubljana with Austrian border, and through Niš and Skopje with Greek border. It became the main road link between Central Europe and South-Eastern Europe and Middle East. Nowadays, the section going from Belgrade to the Croatian border is known as the A3, and links Serbia directly by motorway to Slovenia, Italy, Austria and the rest of Western Europe. While the section linking Belgrade to Niš and further to the border with North Macedonia is the A1 motorway and stretches all the way until Athens, passing through Skopje and Thessaloniki. With the break-up of Yugoslavia and the geostrategical change, the A1 was linked with the motorway linking Belgrade further North towards Novi Sad, Subotica and the border with Hungary going all way until Budapest. In Niš, the motorway has an extension that runs through Pirot towards the border with Bulgaria, linking it further with Bulgarian capital Sofia and running all the way until Istanbul becoming the most accessible motorway linking the Balkans with Turkey, Middle East and rest of Asia.

== Rail transport ==
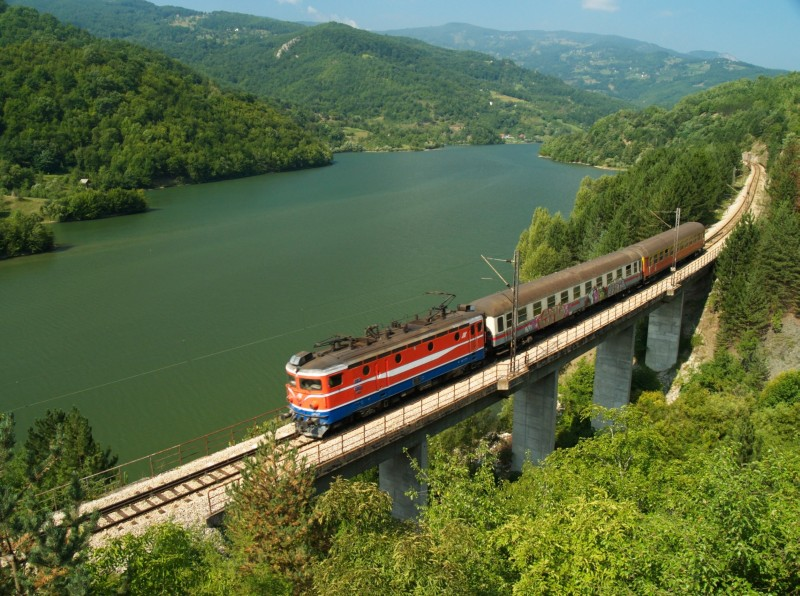
ZS (Železnice Srbije, Serbian Railways) class 441 locomotive with the morning stopping train from Belgrade to Prijepolje.

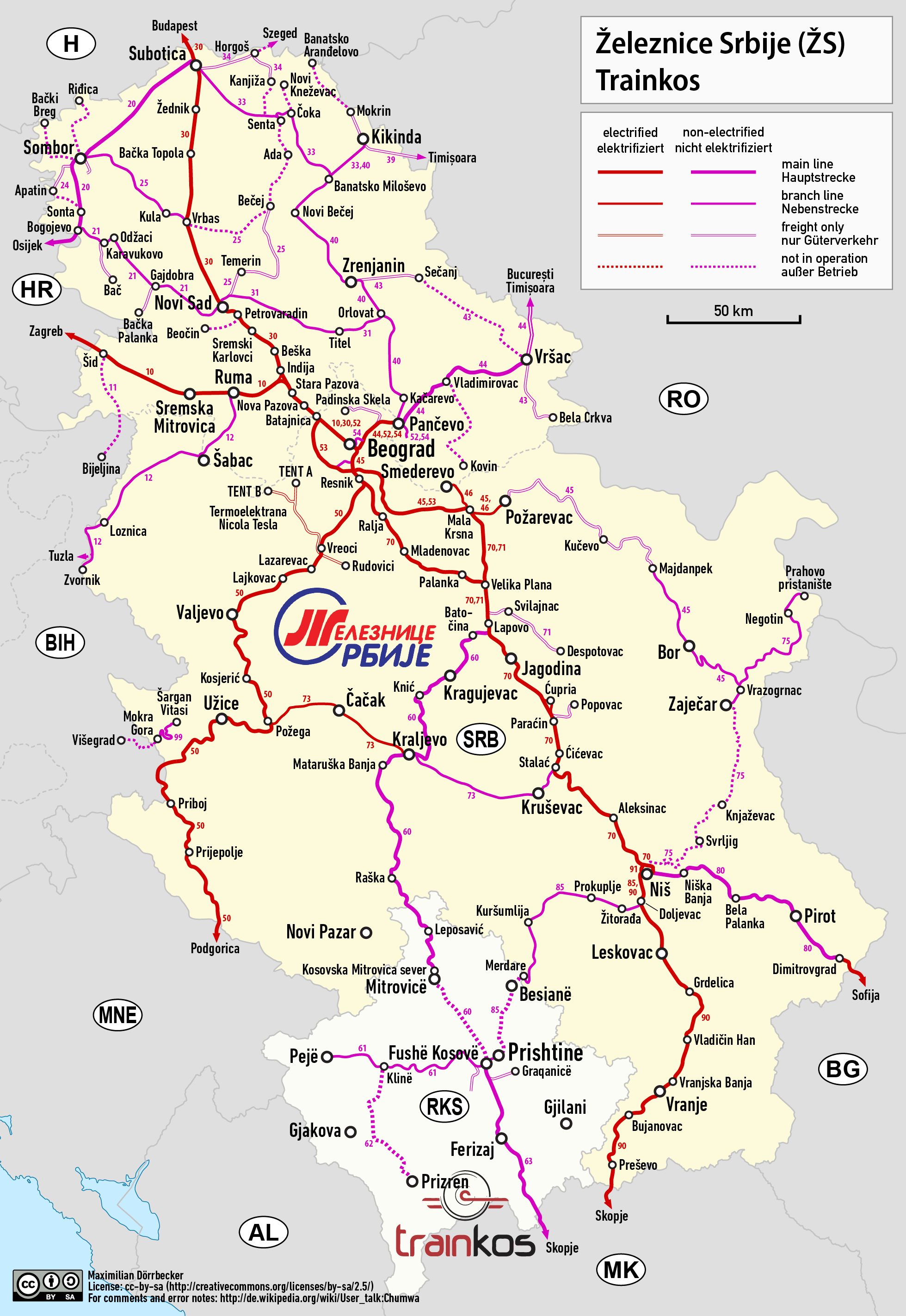
Railway network in Serbia

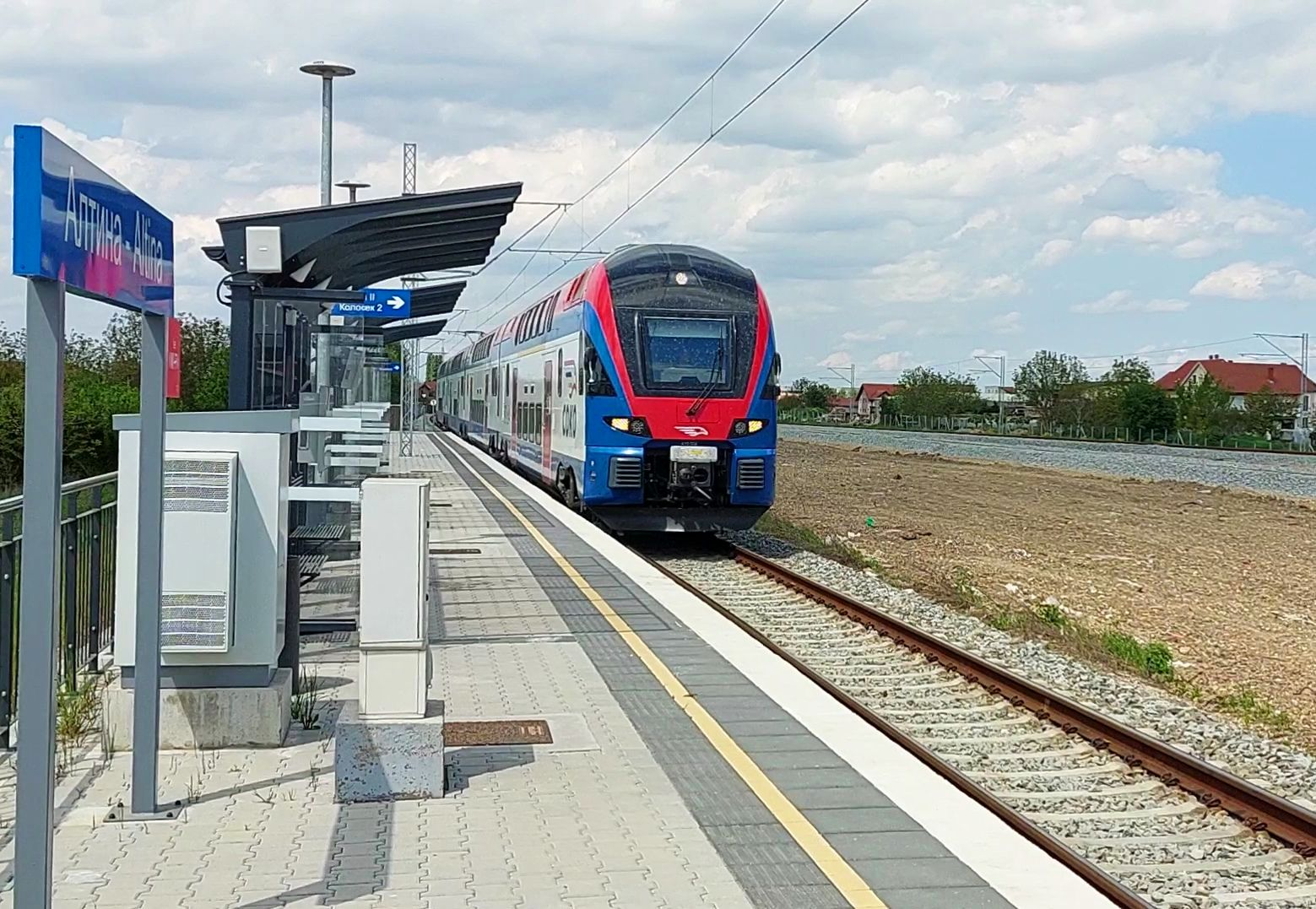
High-speed train Soko ŽS 410

In March 2015, the Government of Serbia announced its plan to establish three additional new railway companies, splitting the Serbian Railways in separate businesses. Those companies are: Srbija Voz operating passenger transport, Srbija Kargo operating cargo transport and Serbian Railways Infrastructure operating as infrastructure management company.

Rail remains a popular mode for freight transportation with 12.3 million tons carried in 2018. Passenger services are less utilized, carrying just over 16 million passengers in 2018 plus the 5 million riderships in the Belgrade urban rail system.

The railway system in Serbia consists of 3,739 km of rails, of which 295 km is double track (7.9% of the network). 33.6% of the network (1,279 km) is electrified. Railroads are categorized as either main lines, regional lines, local lines or sidings. Serbia has rail links with all of its neighbouring countries.

== Air transport ==
There are in total 39 airports and 2 heliports in Serbia. In addition, three airports are with regular passenger traffic service: Belgrade Nikola Tesla Airport, Niš Constantine the Great Airport and Kraljevo Morava Airport.The total air traffic in 2022 reached 6,014,625 passengers and 20 thousand tons in annual cargo tonnage. This figure includes all three airports with schedule international and domestic flights.

No.	Airport names	City
1	Belgrade Nikola Tesla Airport	Belgrade
2	Niš Constantine the Great Airport	Niš
3	Morava Airport	Kraljevo

Airports of Serbia is Public Enterprise company owned by the Government of Serbia for the purpose of better and more efficient management of the airports in the whole country. The company currently manages 5 airports in Serbia and 1 in Bosnia and Hercegovina. VINCI Airports took over Belgrade Nikola Tesla Airport under concession at the end of 2018. from the state for a period of 25 years.

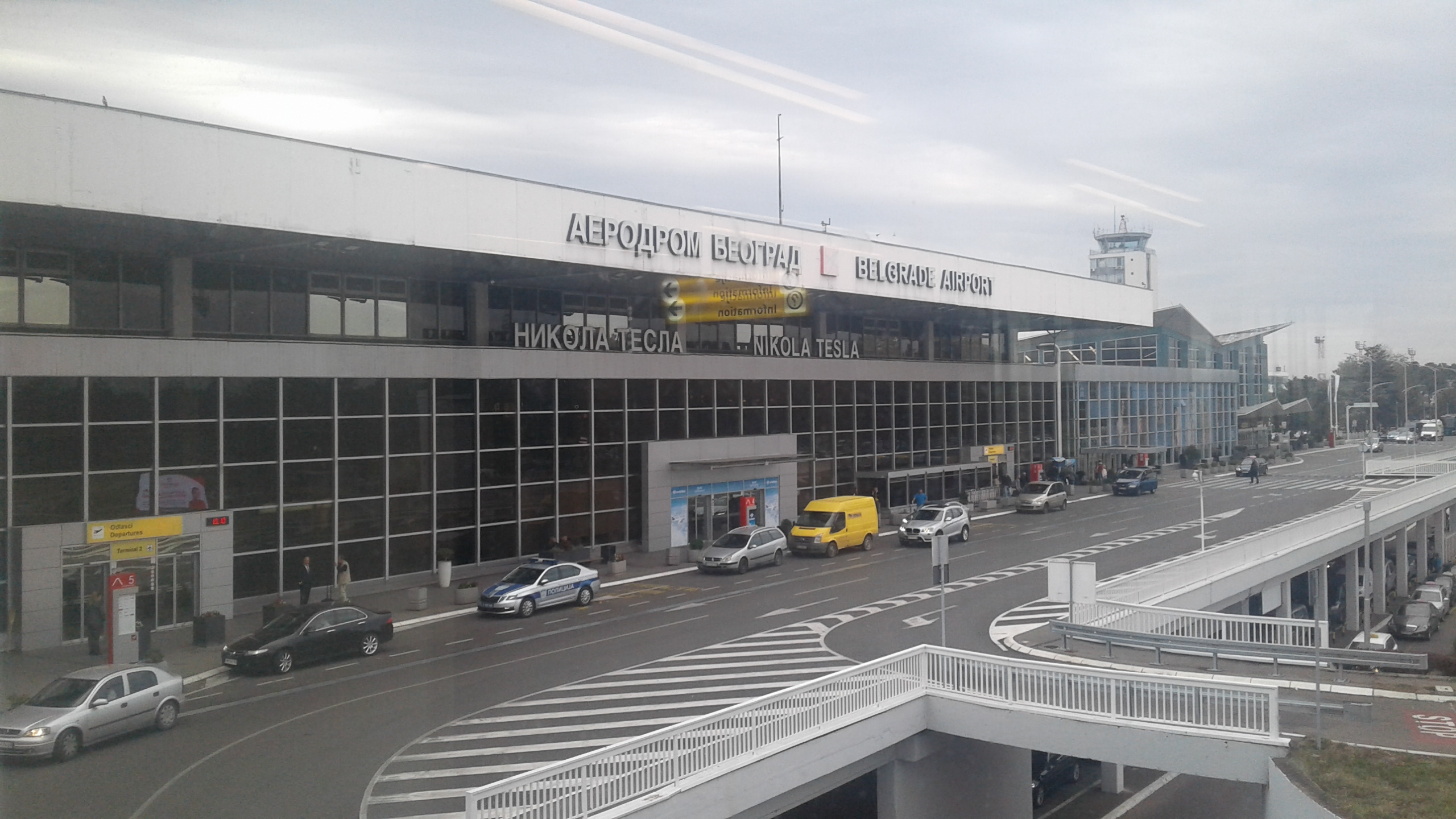
Belgrade Nikola Tesla Airport

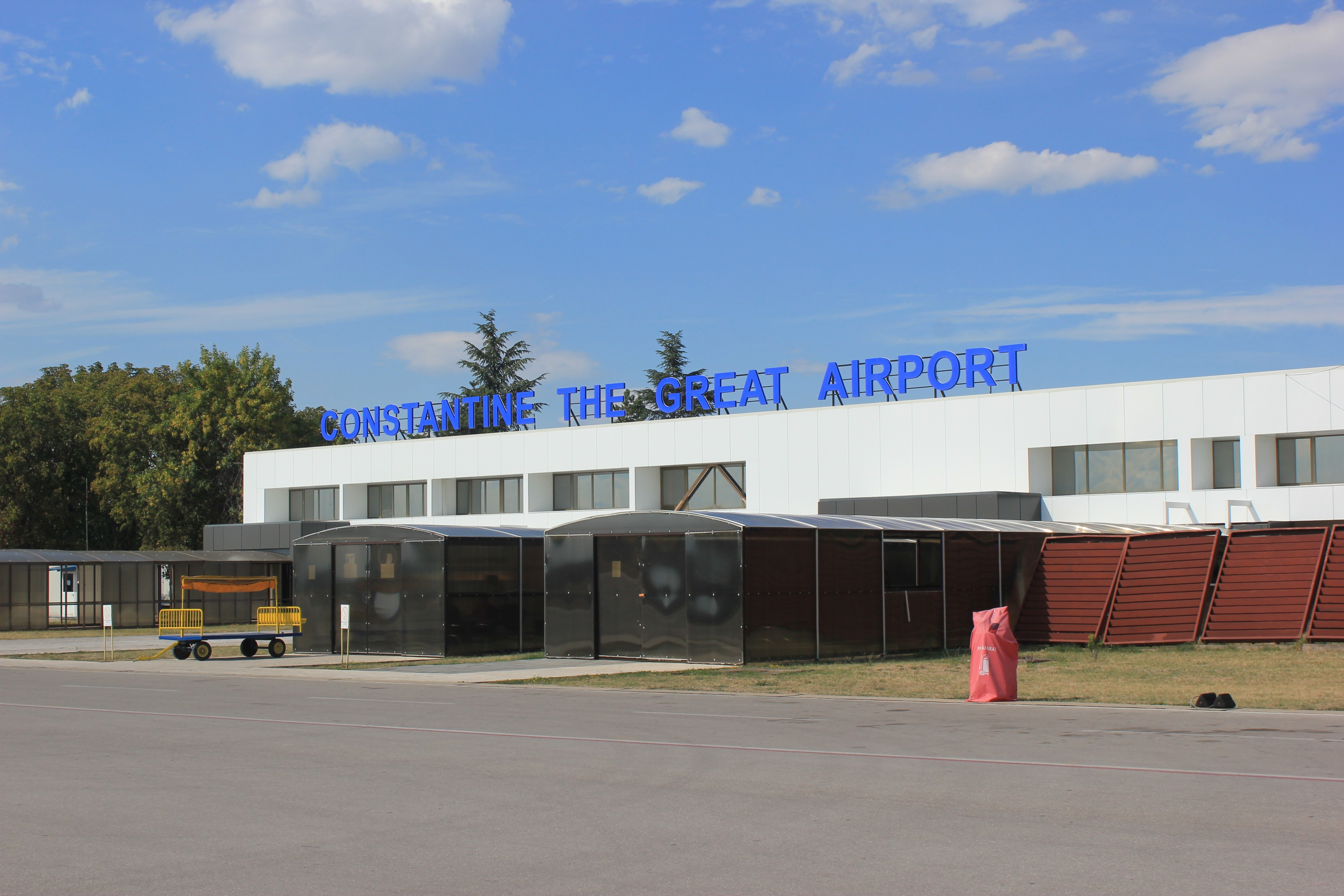
Niš Constantine the Great Airport

The national carrier of the Republic of Serbia is Air Serbia, a legacy carrier which carried some 2.75 million passengers in 2022 flying to the total of 80 domestic and international destinations in more than 30 countries. This includes intercontinental flights to New York City, Chicago and Tianjin. Beside Air Serbia, other established airline companies that fly to Serbia include Lufthansa, Air France, Turkish Airlines, Aeroflot, Qatar Airways, Etihad Airways, Alitalia, Austrian Airlines, Swiss International Air Lines, and LOT Polish Airlines. Currently, the following low-cost airlines are flying to Serbia: Ryanair, EasyJet, Wizz Air, Transavia and Norwegian Air Shuttle.

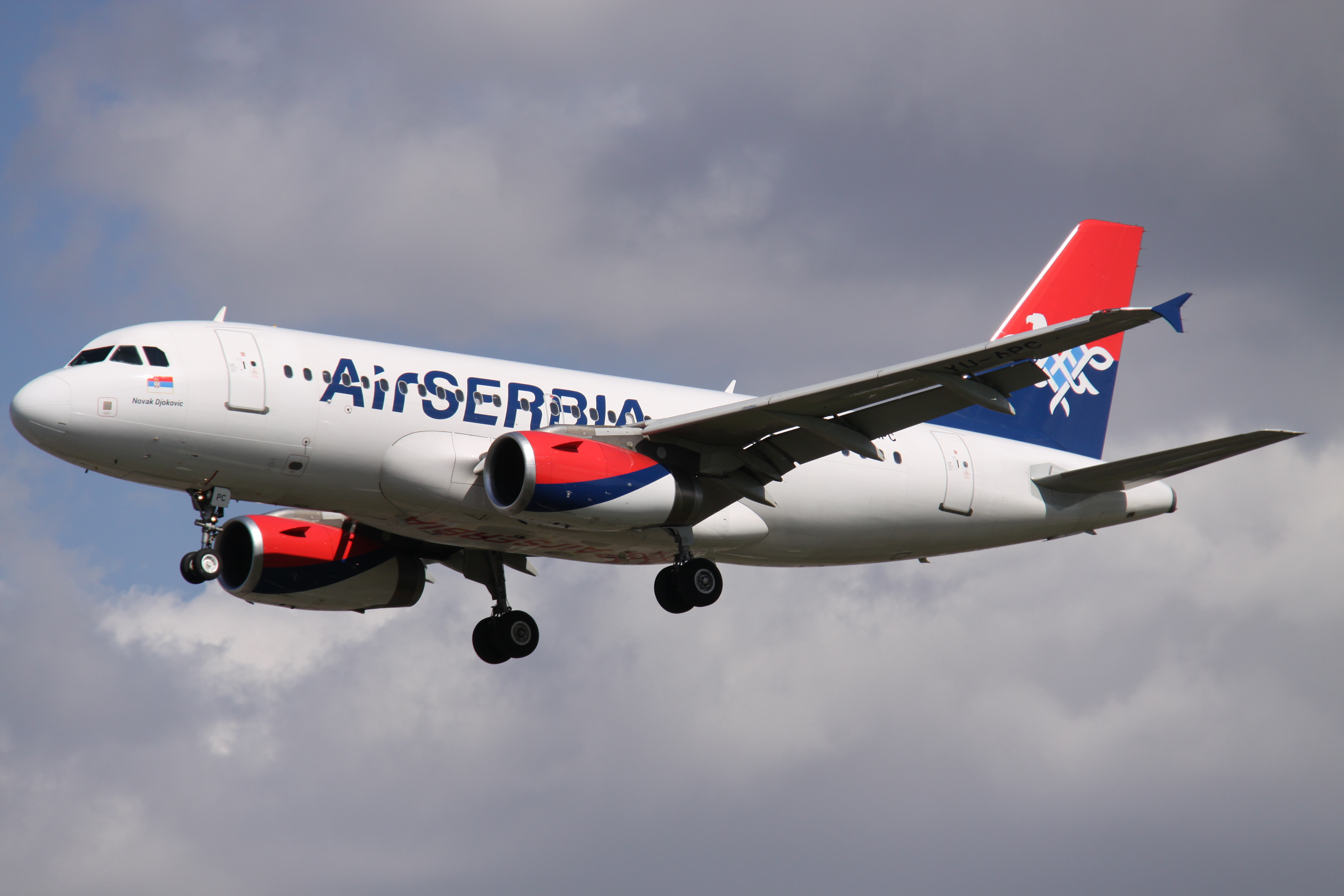
Air Serbia Airbus A319-100

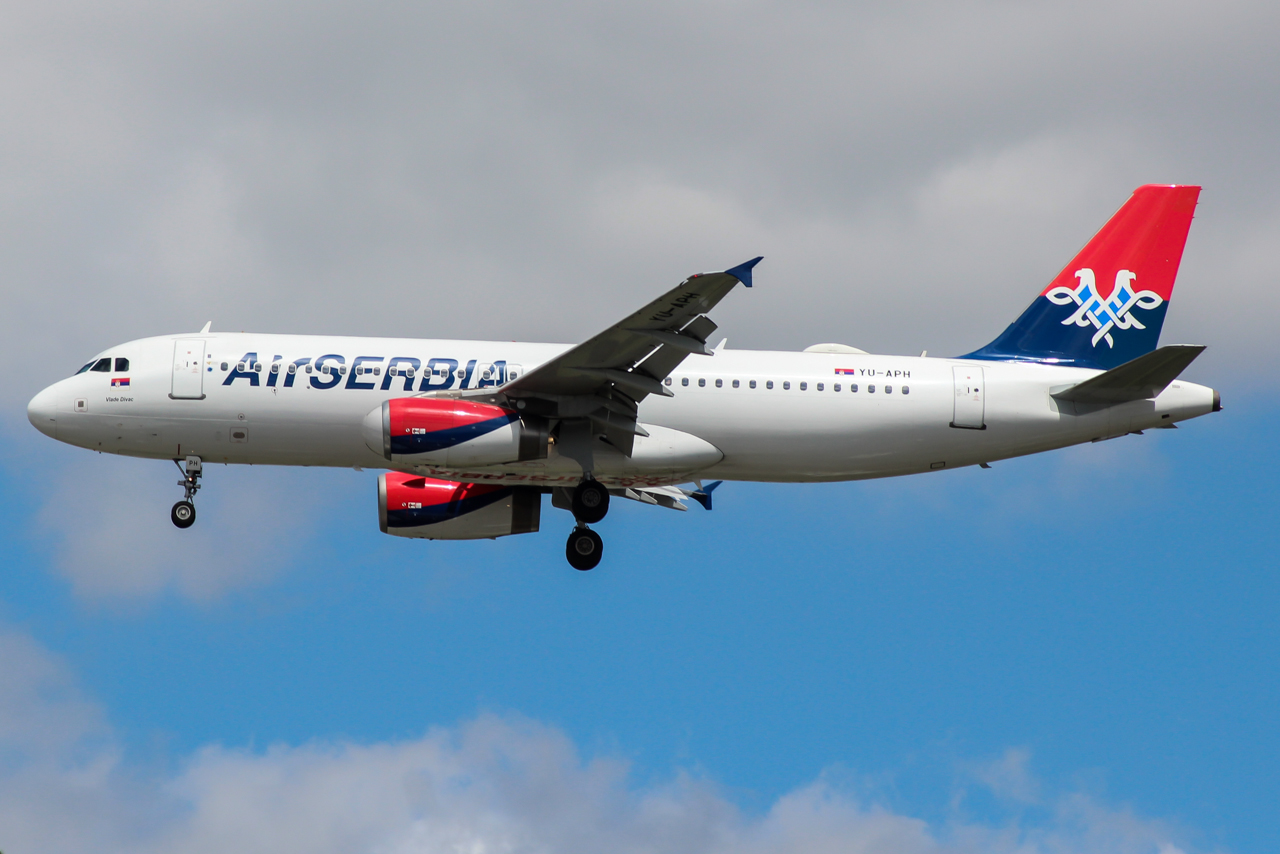
Air Serbia Airbus A320-200

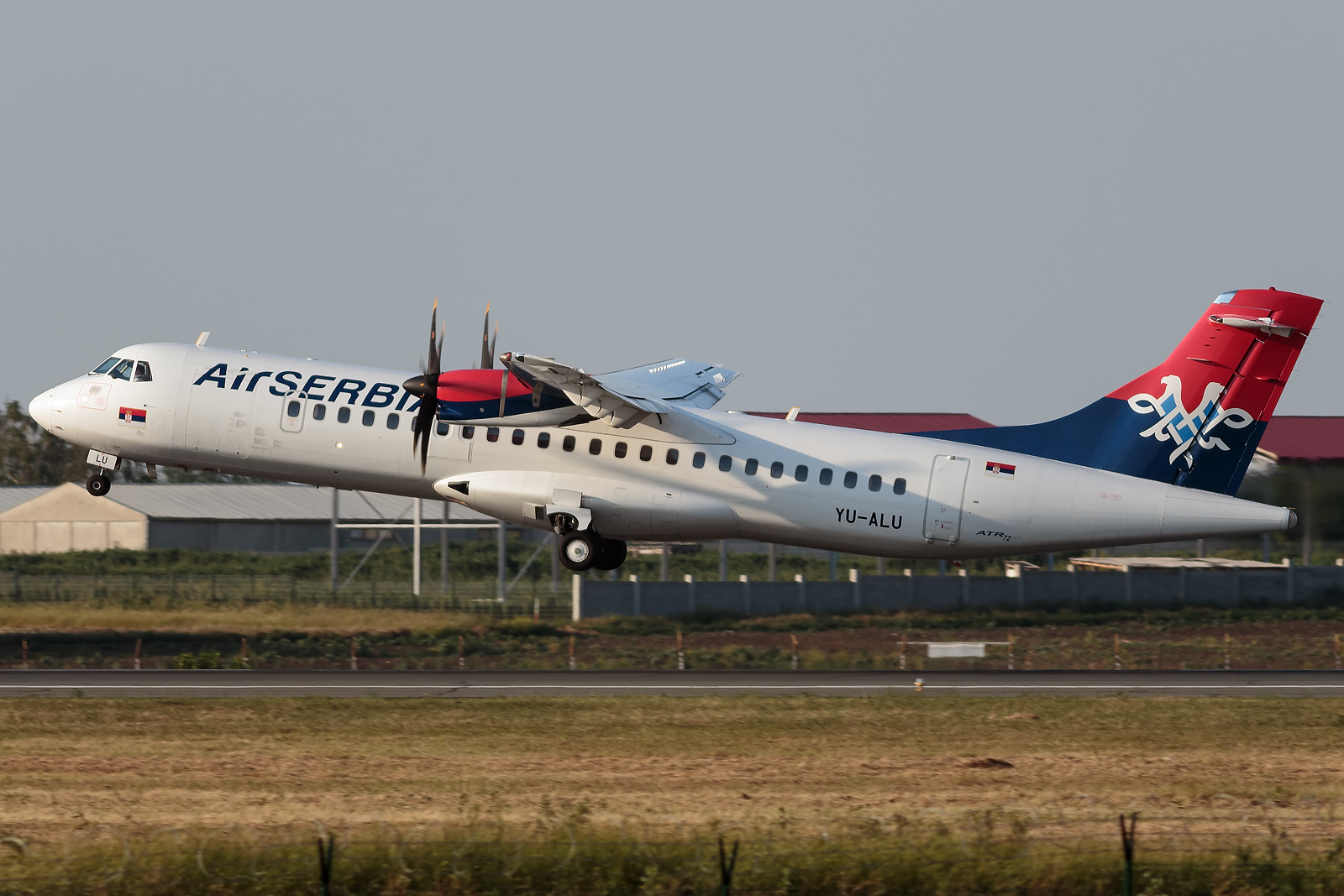
Air Serbia ATR 72-500

=== Historical preview ===
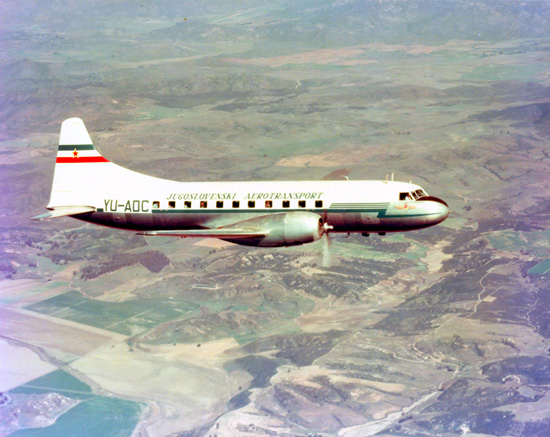
JAT Convair CV-340

Serbia was among the pioneers in mail, freight and passenger air transport. The first airfields were inaugurated in 1910. In 1914, the Banjica airfield was the base for the Serbian Air Force squadron and the Balloon Company. After the end of the First World War, the Banjica airfield was used for airmail traffic and included the routes Novi Sad–Belgrade–Niš–Skoplje and Belgrade–Sarajevo–Mostar. Regular passenger transport greatly expanded with the creation of Aeroput in 1927 which became the Yugoslav flag-carrier and with over 30 planes and having its hub in Belgrade, it became the 21st airline in the world. It linked Belgrade and other Serbian cities such as Niš and Podujevo with destinations all around Yugoslavia and also with the main airports in Austria, Albania, Czechoslovakia, Bulgaria, Hungary, Italy, Romania and Greece. As early as 1923 foreign companies started regular routes that included Belgrade. Besides Aeroput, Air France, Deutsche Luft Hansa, KLM, Imperial Airways and airlines from Italy, Austria, Hungary, Romania and Poland also used the airport until the outbreak of the Second World War. It was one of them, the CFRNA, that on its route linking Belgrade with Paris and Bucharest, in 1923, that made the first world night flight ever in history. The constantly increasing number of passengers made inevitable the building of a modern airport in 1931, which included a modern terminal building and top landing equipment for poor visibility conditions, that were installed in 1936.

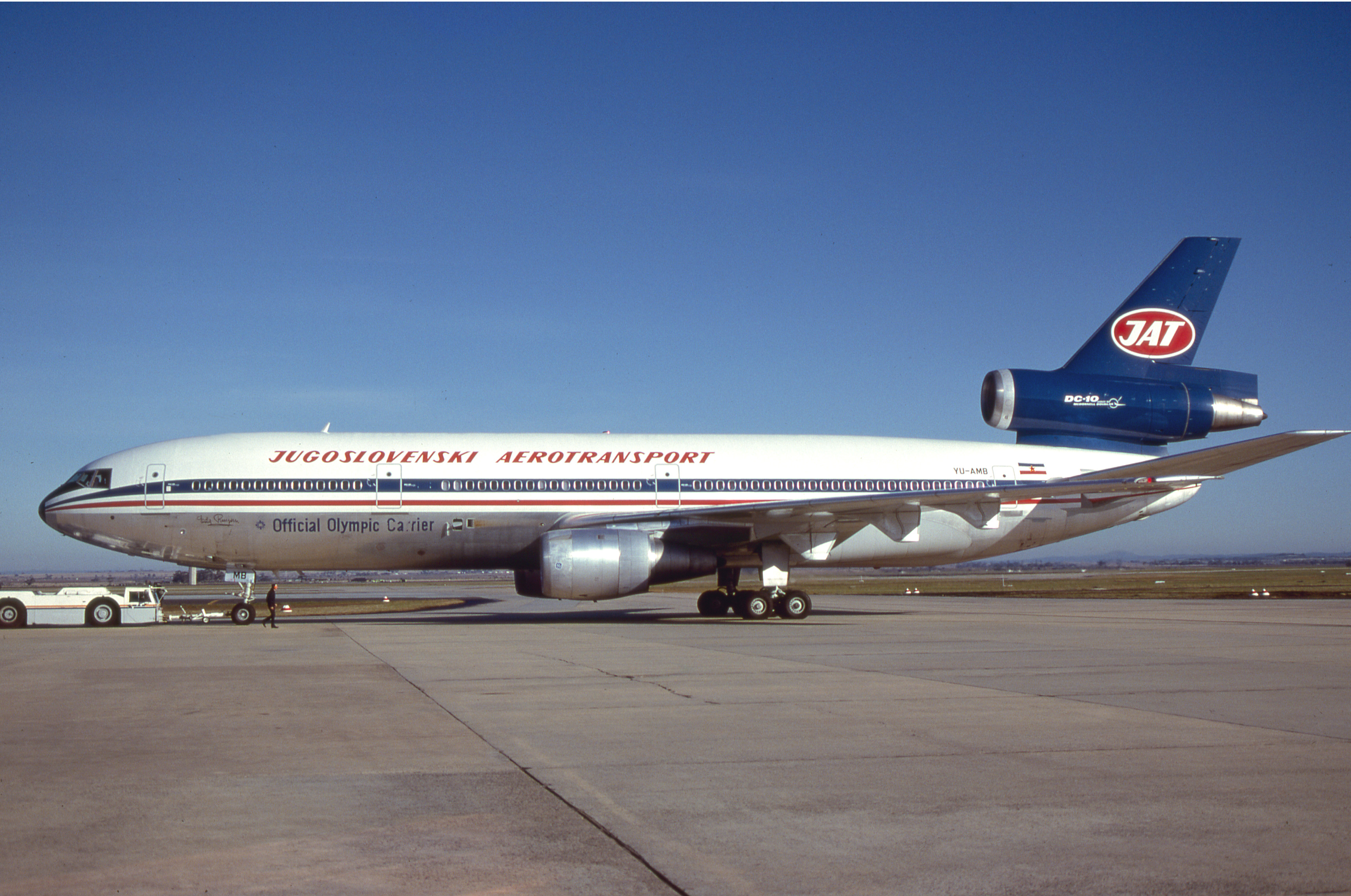
JAT McDonnell Douglas DC-10-30 at Sydney Airport, 1985, with classic livery

At the end of Second World War the country changed from a monarchy to a communist regime. Aeroput was rebranded as JAT Yugoslav Airlines and the reconstruction of the much destroyed infrastructure begin. After Tito–Stalin Split in 1948, Yugoslavia became one of the leaders of the Non-Aligned Movement. Following this policy, JAT inaugurated inter-continental flights linking capital Belgrade with all five continents. Its geopolitical position made it able to acquire both, West and East build aircraft. A new modern airport, the Belgrade international airport was inaugurated in 1962. Belgrade became a national and regional hub. Besides JAT, a number of other charter and regional airlines were created, with Aviogenex being the one based in Belgrade. Also, Adria Airways, partially owned by Serbian company InterExport, included numerous flights linking Belgrade with different destinations around the world. During SFRY period Belgrade was linked with flights to destinations as far as Sydney, Singapore, Kuala Lumpur, Bangkok, Beijing, Johannesburg, New York, Chicago, Montreal or Toronto. Passengers from the region could access all these destinations through connection flights through Belgrade.

The air transport industry was in continuous growth and expansion until the beginning of the Yugoslav wars and the break-up of Yugoslavia. During the war, severe sanctions were imposed upon Serbia and Montenegro which included no-flight zone over Serbia and prohibition of international flights to and from Serbia and Montenegro. This was a major set-back for Serbian airline industry. It will be only after Kosovo War and overthrow of Milosevic that by year 2000 air transport industry started to recover.

== Water transport ==
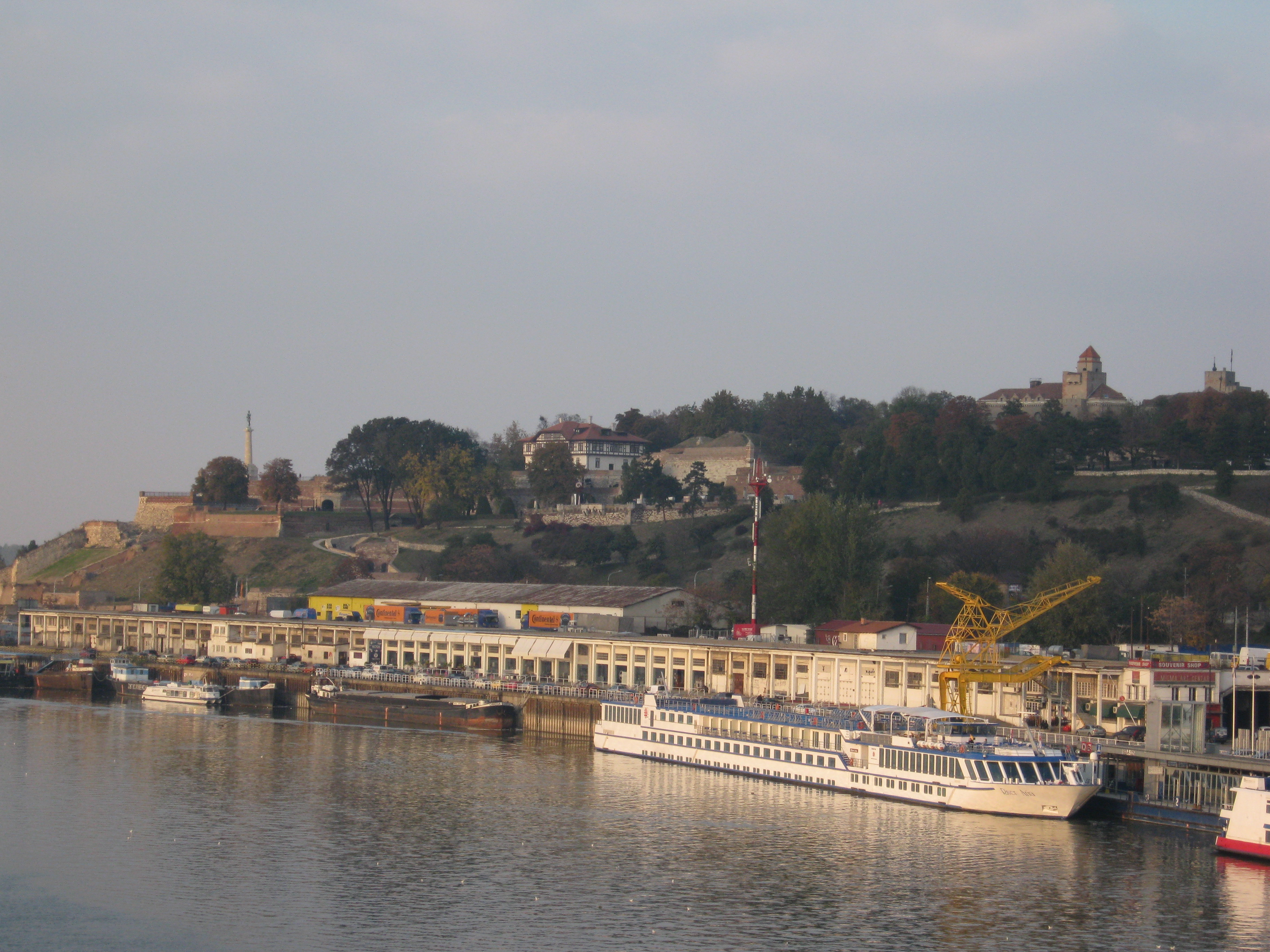
Port of Belgrade

Serbia has a fairly developed inland water transport which carried over 2 million tons of cargo in 2016. There are 1,716 kilometers of navigable inland waterways (1,043 km of navigable rivers and 673 km of navigable canals), which are almost all located in northern third of the country. The most important inland waterway is the Danube, that is part of Pan-European Corridor VII. Other navigable rivers in Serbia include Sava, Tisza, Begej and Timiş River, all of which connect Serbia with Northern and Western Europe through the Rhine–Main–Danube Canal and North Sea route. To Eastern Europe Serbia is connected via the Begej and Danube via Black Sea route, and to Southern Europe via the Sava river.

Important ports on Danube river are: Port of Novi Sad (1.18 million tons of cargo tonnage in 2016) and Port of Belgrade are the largest, while other river ports on the same river include: Pančevo, Smederevo, Prahovo, Apatin and Bačka Palanka. On Sava river, Šabac Port is the most significant and on Begej river that is Senta Port.

Merchant river fleet include 149 ships: 146 cargo vessels (with total capacity of 173 thousand tons) and 3 passenger ships.

== Pipelines ==
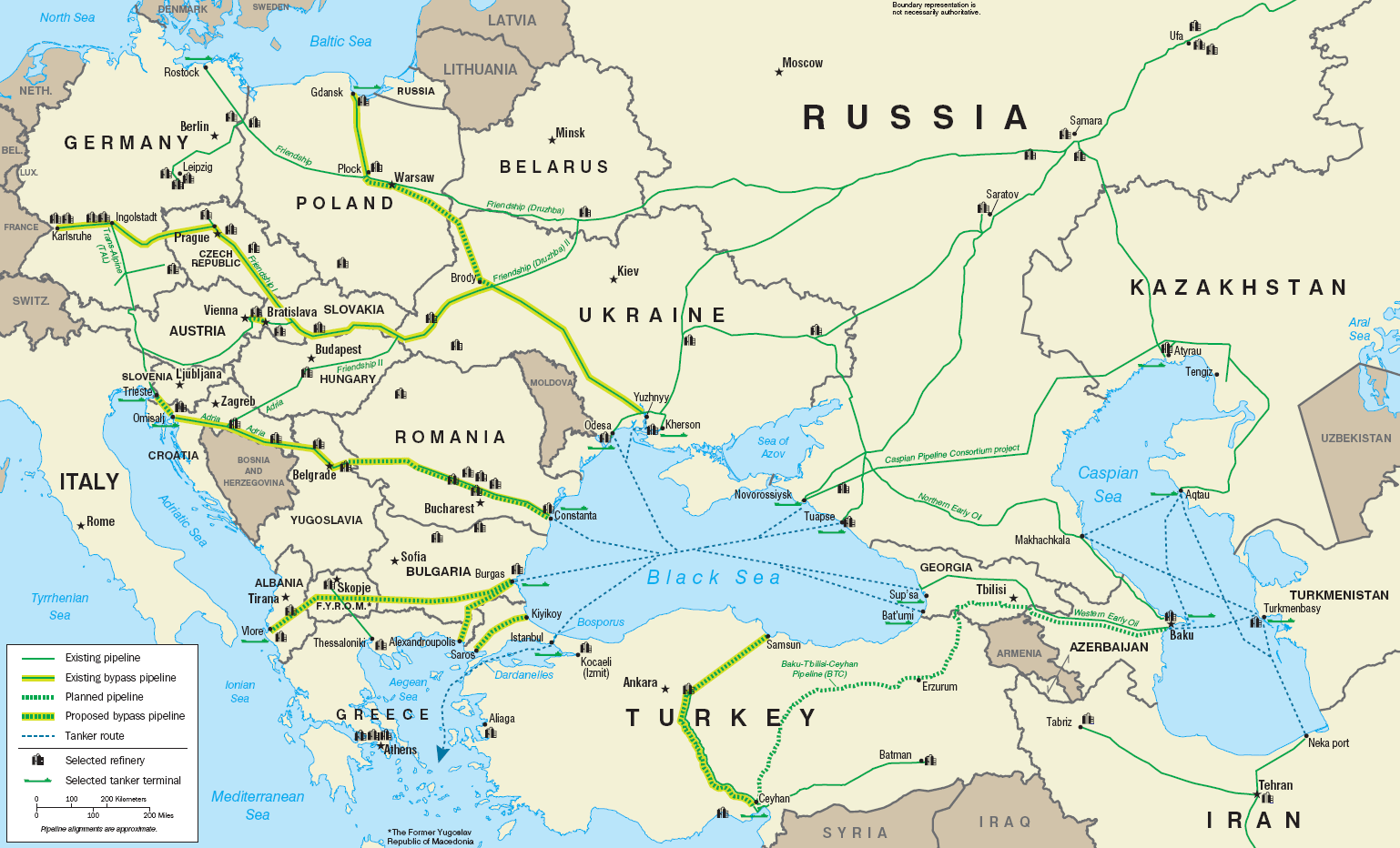
Oil pipelines map

Through pipeline network some 6.2 million tons of gas and oil were transported in 2018. The natural gas transportation system comprises 3,177 kilometers of trunk and regional natural gas pipelines with 450 million cubic meter underground gas storage facility at Banatski Dvor. There are 155 kilometers of crude oil pipelines connecting Pančevo and Novi Sad refineries as a part of trans-national Adria oil pipeline.

== See also ==
- Roads in Serbia
- Vehicle registration plates of Serbia
- Serbian Railways
- Serbia Train
- Airports of Serbia
