= Serbian Railways =

Serbian engineering company

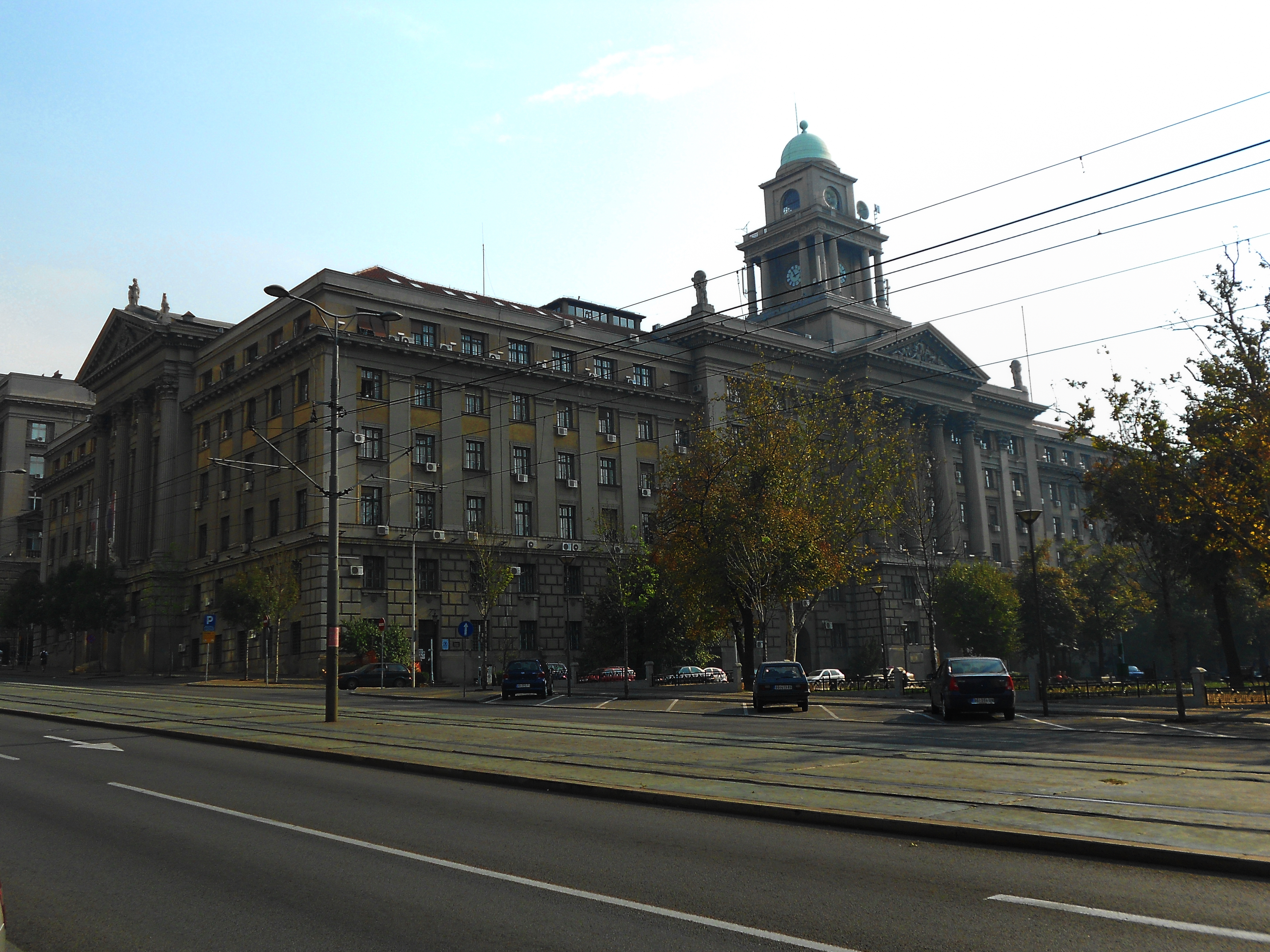
- Headquarters of Serbian Railways in Belgrade
- Native name: Железнице Србије
- Romanized name: Železnice Srbije
- Type: State-owned enterprise
- Industry: Engineering; Technical consulting
- Founded: 17 May 2005; 21 years ago (Current form); 1881; 145 years ago (Originally founded)
- Headquarters: Nemanjina 6, Belgrade, Serbia
- Area served: Serbia
- Key people: Goran Adžić (General director)
- Revenue: ▲€32.76 million (2022)
- Net income: ▼ (€10.19 million) (2022)
- Total assets: ▼€204.80 million (2018)
- Total equity: ▲ (€441.09 million) (2022)
- Owner: Government of Serbia (56.43%); Serbian Development Fund (43.57%)
- Number of employees: 1,441 (2022)
- Subsidiaries: Srbijakombi d.o.o.; Zavod za zdravstvenu zaštitu "Železnice Srbije"; Železnički integralni transport; Saobracajni institut "CIP" d.o.o.; Predzueće za izgradnju železničkog čvora d.o.o.; "Zaštitna radionica" d.o.o.
- Website: https://serbianrailways.com
- Footnotes; Business ID: 20038284; Tax ID: 103859991

Serbian Railways network
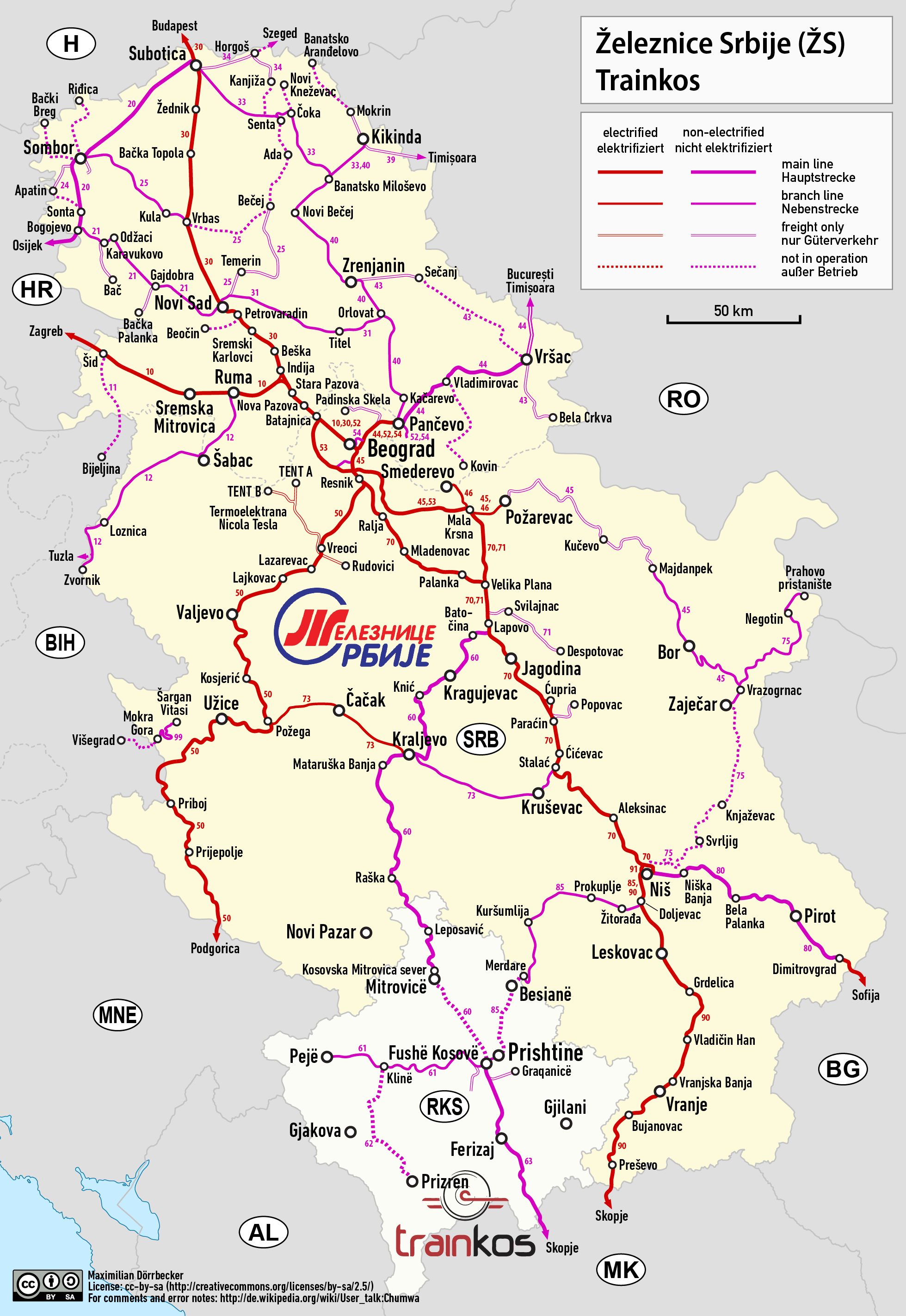
- Map of Serbian rail network

Overview
- Locale: Serbia
- Dates of operation: 1881–present

Technical
- Track gauge: 1,435 mm (4 ft 8 1/2 in)
- Electrification: 25 kV AC, 50 Hz OHLE
- Length: 3,739 km (2,323 mi)

Serbian Railways (Serbian: Железнице Србије / Železnice Srbije; abbr. ЖС / ŽS) is a Serbian engineering and technical consulting company based in Belgrade, Serbia. In 2015, the Government of Serbia established three new companies which took over Serbian Railways' former jurisdictions: Srbijavoz (passenger transport), Srbija Kargo (cargo transport) and Serbian Railways Infrastructure (infrastructure management). These companies are not part of the company Serbian Railways.

Since then, Serbian Railways continued with modified business activity: engineering and technical consulting, consulting activities in the field of information technology and other information technology services, buying and selling real estate, rental and management activities, accounting, bookkeeping and auditing activities, tax advisory services, technical testing and analysis, rental and leasing of other machinery, equipment of non-material goods, activities of the museums, galleries and collections.

Serbia is a member of the International Union of Railways (UIC). The UIC Country Code for Serbia is 72.

== History ==
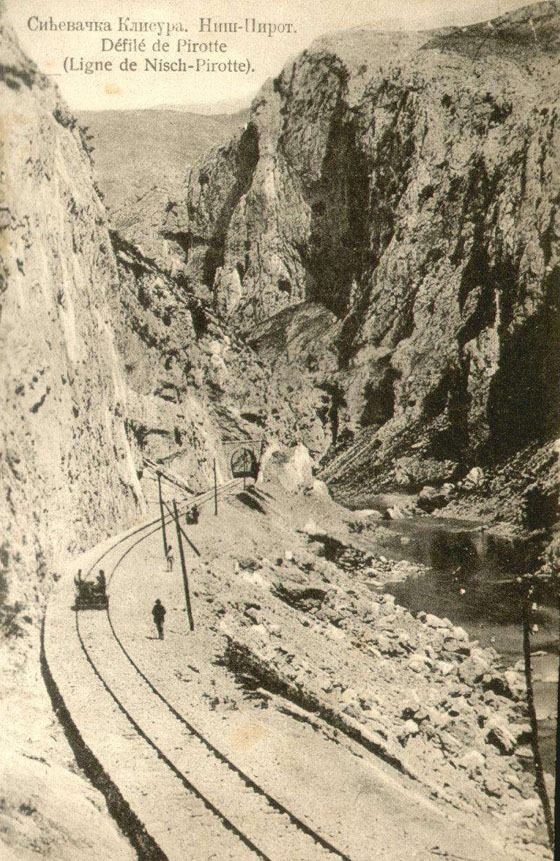
Construction of Niš–Pirot railway in Sićevo Gorge during 1885

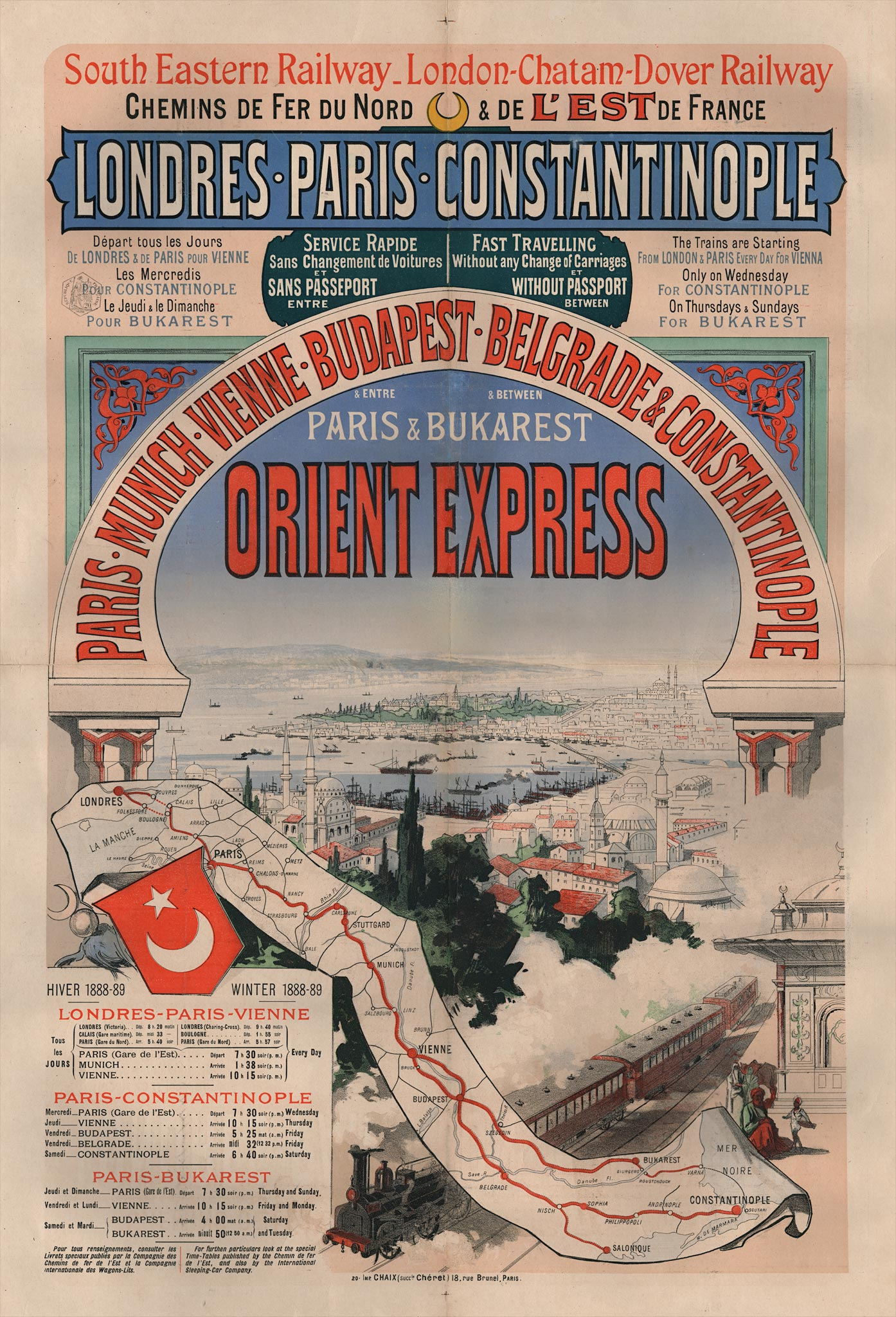
Historical advertisement showing the Orient Express in 1888

=== Early history ===
The history of rail transport in Serbia began in the mid-19th century when most of the territory was still held by the Austro-Hungarian and Ottoman Empires. The first rail line on the present-day territory of Serbia was inaugurated on 20 August 1854, between Lisava-Oravica-Bazijaš and the train operated on horse-drawn traffic which was replaced in 1856 by steam locomotives. Part of the line is located in Serbia, passing through Bela Crkva while the rest is in Romania. All subsequently built lines were laid towards Budapest as the territory was still part of the Austro-Hungarian Empire back then. On the territory which was under the Ottomans, the line Skopje-Kosovska Mitrovica was inaugurated in 1874. However, the major expansion began after the Berlin Congress and the independence of the, theretofore vassal to the Ottomans, Principality of Serbia during the second half of the 19th century.

Serbian Railways as a company is traced back to 1881 when Prince Milan I declared formation of the Serbian National Railways. The first train departed from Belgrade to Niš on 23 August 1884, which is considered by Serbian Railways as the official year when the company was created.

This was not the first operational railway on the territory of then-Kingdom of Serbia, though, as the one in opened in 1882, a primarily industrial, though occasionally used for passenger transport, 12 km (7.5 mi) long 600 mm (1 ft 11 5/8 in) wide gauge track from Majdanpek copper processing plant to Velike Livade (a former village taken over by the plant) and constructed by the Serbian Copper & Iron Co. (official name in English, most stockholders were British) had its first run on the track in June 1882.

Another one in Eastern Serbia followed suit in 1888, the 80 km (50 mi) long dual purpose (industrial and passenger transport) 760 mm (2 ft 5 15/16 in) track from Vrška Čuka mine to the port of Radujevac on the Danube, built by the Societé Anonyme "L'Industrielle Serbe" registered at Brussels in Belgian, French, (Austro-)Hungarian, and Serbian ownership (in order of the percentage of stock owned).

From the 1920s until the 1990s, it operated under the name Yugoslav Railways, responsible for railways in the Socialist Federal Republic of Yugoslavia. The first electrified line was opened between Belgrade and Šid in 1970. The line connecting Serbia with south Adriatic (Belgrade-Bar) was opened in 1976.

=== 1990–2015 ===
During the 1990s, following the dissolution of the Socialist Federal Republic of Yugoslavia, railways in Serbia suffered the lack of maintenance of infrastructure and the level of traffic, especially cargo, decreased dramatically. As of 2000, Serbian Railways had a total of 32,832 employees. The negative trend continued into the 2000s. Better days for railways started in the early 2010s when program of modernization, both of infrastructure and rolling stock, have begun.

In 2013, Serbian Railways signed a contract with RZD International, worth $840 million, aimed at modernization of aging infrastructure by focusing on improving key sections of main railway lines. The section between Ruma and Golubinci on Belgrade-Šid line was reconstructed in 2014 and additional five sections on Belgrade-Niš-Preševo line (Sopot-Kosmajski Kovačevac, Mala Krsna-Velika Plana, Vinarce-Đorđevo, Vranjska Banja-Ristovac, and Bujanovac-Bukarevac) were modernized and revitalized in 2015 and 2016, while the section between Belgrade and Pančevo on Belgrade-Vršac line saw doubling tracks along with the reconstruction.

=== 2015–present ===
In March 2015, the Government of Serbia announced its plan to establish three additional new railway companies, splitting the Serbian Railways in separate businesses. Those companies are: Srbijavoz operating passenger transport, Srbija Kargo operating cargo transport and Serbian Railways Infrastructure operating as infrastructure management company.

Those three companies, fully separated and independent from the Serbian Railways were founded on 10 August 2015, in the process of reconstruction and better optimization of business. In the process, around 6,000 employees left the company with severance payments, which amounts to 39 million euros, by the end of 2017, thus cutting total number of employees from 17,635 in 2016 to around 11,500 in 2018, in all four rail related companies combined. From 2018 to 2020, in the third wave of dismissals, another 1,500 employees are planned to leave the company, cutting the total number of employees to around 10,000 by 2020. That would be 7,635 less employees (43.29%) than in 2016, and 22,800 less (69.51%) than in 2000.

== Passenger transport ==
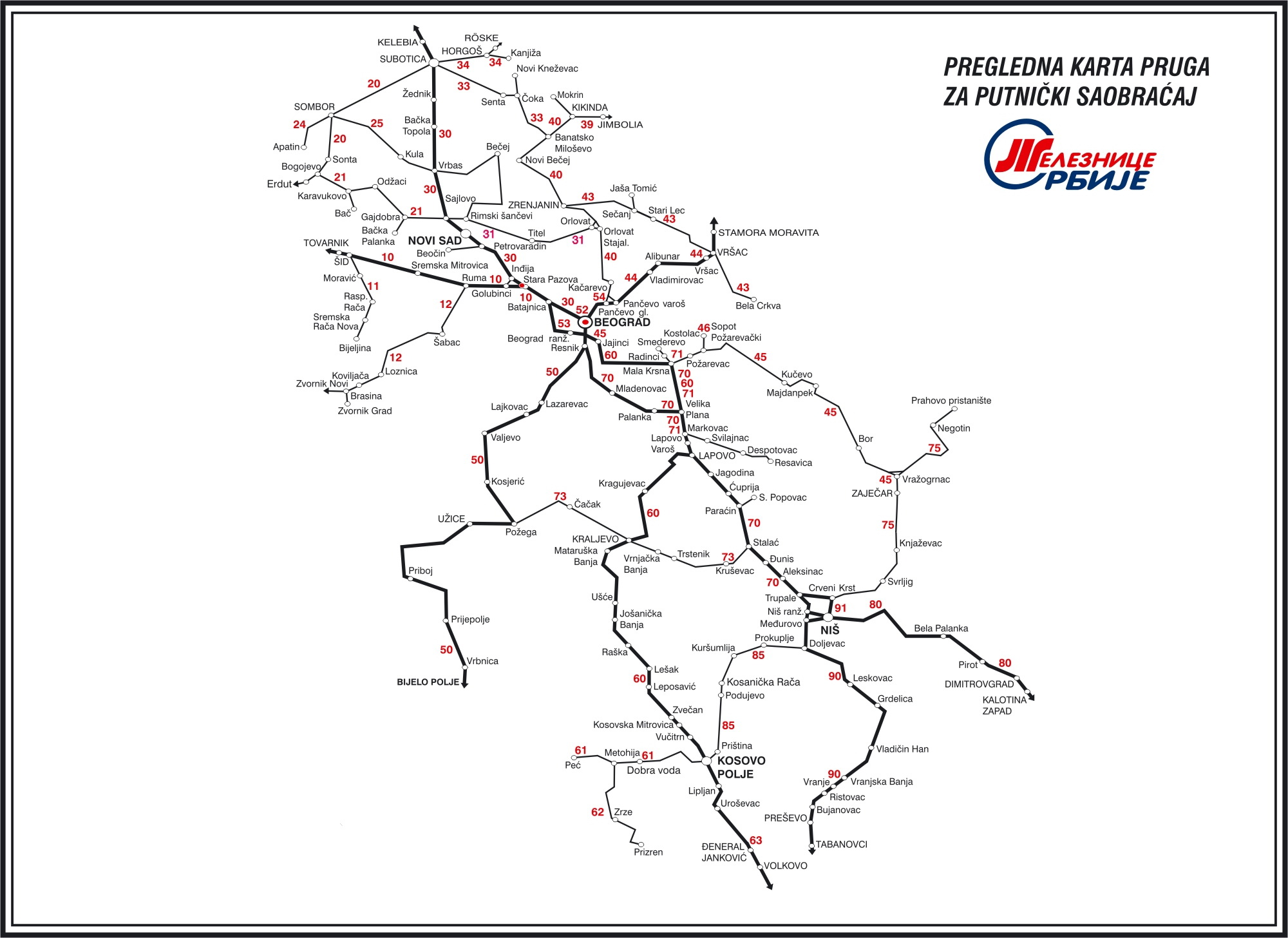
Passenger trains map operated by Srbijavoz

The company was responsible for passenger transport until 2015.

The Serbian railway system consists of 3,739 km (2,323 mi) of rails of which 295 km (183 mi) is double track (7.9% of the network). Some 1,279 km (795 mi) of track (33.6% of the network) is electrified. Serbia has rail links with all of adjacent countries, except Albania.

=== Domestic railway network ===
Railroads are categorized as "main lines", "regional lines", "local lines" or "manipulative lines". Following is the table of main lines in Serbia:

No.	Route	Length	Tracks	Electrification	Notes
1	Belgrade – Ruma – Border with Croatia near Šid	120 km	2	yes	It is shared track between Belgrade and Stara Pazova with Railway line 4.
2	Belgrade – Niš – Border with North Macedonia near Preševo	398 km	1/2	yes	Two tracks are between Velika Plana and Stalać as well as between Đunis and Niš. Modernization and reconstruction is planned to start in 2023 up to high-speed rail of maximum 200 km/h between Belgrade and Niš.
3	Belgrade – Mala Krsna – Velika Plana	102 km	1	yes	
4	Belgrade – Novi Sad – Border with Hungary near Subotica	183 km	2	yes	High-speed (200 km/h) rail is completely operational for passenger and freight trains.
5	Niš – Pirot – Border with Bulgaria near Dimitrovgrad	104 km	1	no	Reconstruction, electrification and modernization started in November 2023 and will last the next three and a half years for the maximum speed of 120 km/h.
6	Belgrade – Pančevo – Border with Romania near Vršac	102 km	1/2	partially	There are 2 tracks that are electrified between Belgrade and Pančevo.
7	Belgrade – Valjevo – Užice – Border with Montenegro near Prijepolje	299 km	1	yes	
8	Lapovo – Kragujevac – Kraljevo – Administrative line with Kosovo & Metohija near Rudnica	153 km	1	no	
9	Subotica – Sombor – Border with Croatia near Bogojevo	87 km	1	no	

== Rolling stock ==
- Electric locomotives
  - ŽS 441 with total of: 44 units
  - ŽS 444 with total of: 30 units
  - ŽS 461 with total of: 51 units
  - ŽS 193 with total of: 16 units
- Diesel locomotives
  - ŽS 621 with total of: 17 units
  - ŽS 622 with total of: 4 units in total
  - ŽS 641 with total of: 37 units
  - ŽS 644 with total of: 6 units
  - ŽS 661 with total of: 42 units
  - ŽS 664 with total of: 6 units on lease from Slovenian Railways
  - ŽS 666 with total of: 4 units
- Electric trainsets
  - ŽS 412 with total of: 20 units
  - ŽS 413 with total of: 21 units
- Diesel trainsets
  - ŽS 710 with total of: 6 units
  - ŽS 711 with total of: 39 units
- Passenger carriages
  - Passenger cars - "open" or "compartment" with total of: 364 units
  - Sleeping cars with total of: 52 units
  - Couchette cars with total of: 63 units
  - Dining cars with total of: 15 units

== See also ==
- Transport in Serbia
- Srbijavoz
- Srbija Kargo
- Serbian Railways Infrastructure
