= ŽS series 621 =

Czech-Serbian diesel locomotive

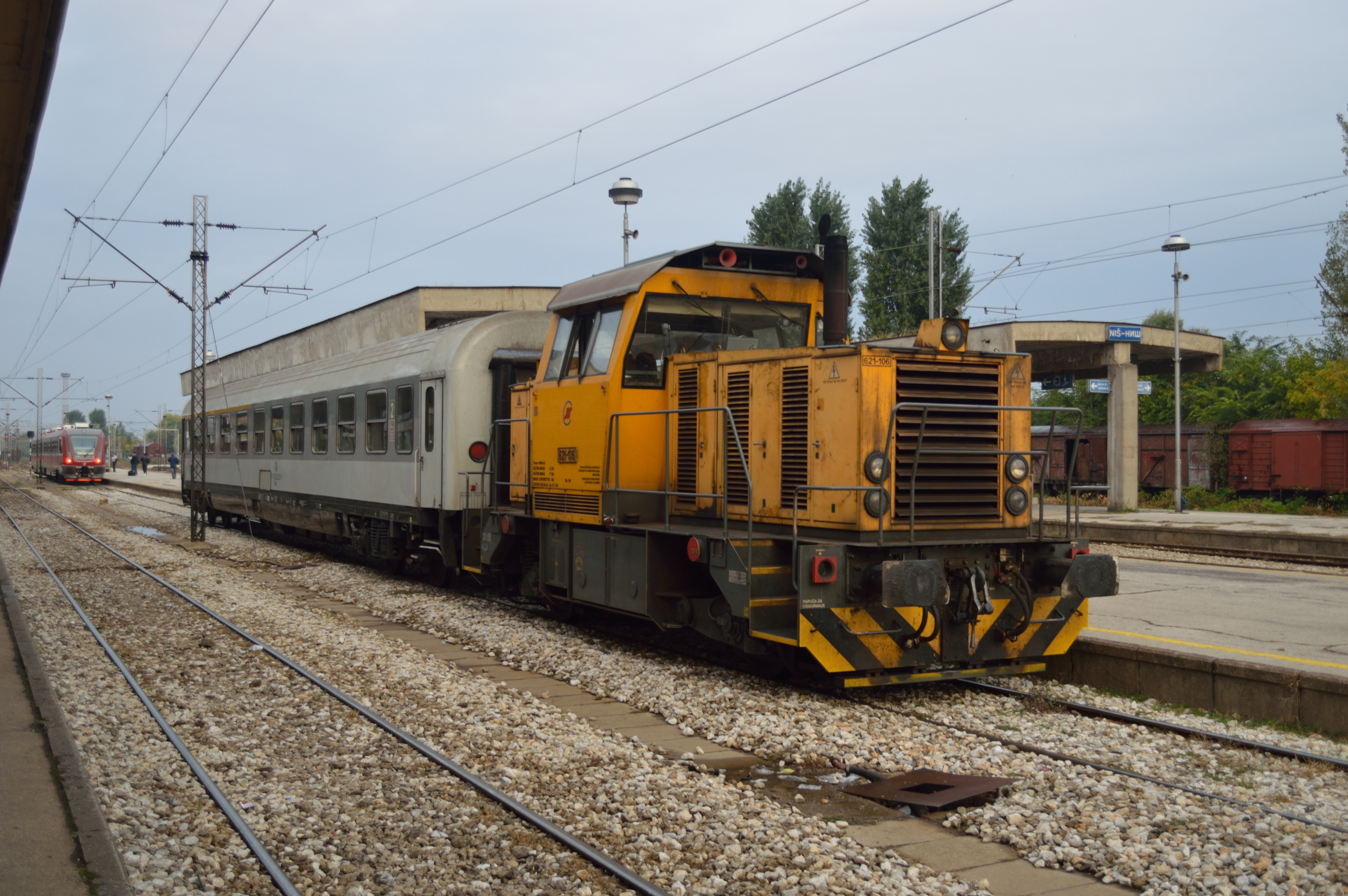
- A ŽS 621 locomotive with a passenger coach
Type and origin
- Power type: Diesel-electric
- Builder: ČMKS
- Build date: 2002 - 2006
Specifications
- Configuration
  - Whyte: 0-4-0DE / 4wDE
  - AAR: B
  - UIC: Bo
- Gauge: 1,435 mm (4 ft 8 1/2 in)
- Wheel diameter: 1,050 mm (41.34 in)
- Length: 9,450 mm (31 ft 0 in)
- Width: 3,100 mm (10 ft 2 in)
- Loco weight: 36.00 t (79,400 lb)
- Cylinders: 16
- Transmission: Electric
Performance figures
- Maximum speed: 80 km/h (50 mph)
- Power output: 392 kW (530 hp)
- Tractive effort: 108 kN (24,280 lbf)
Career
- Operators: ŽS, ŽT RBK
- Class: ŽS 621
- Nicknames: "Žutka", "Osica" and "Trafika"
- Locale: Serbia

Designed and built for heavy shunting work, the ŽS series 621 is a series of Czech-made diesel-electric shunting locomotives which is active on Serbian Railways.

== History ==
Serbian Railways bought the first 621 series shunting locomotives in 2001. In 2005 another twenty-two locomotives were purchased and introduced into service. Later two more second-hand shunters from Czech Republic industrial railways were also bought.

The ŽS series 621 locomotive series is divided into sub-classes. These include the series 621-100, for the locomotives ordered in 2001, the series 621-200, for the locomotives ordered in 2005, and the series 621-300, for the two units bought second-hand.

This series was originally designated as the ČMKS 709, with series 621-100 being 709.401, 621-200 being 709.701 and 621-300 being 709.5.

The Kolubara coal basin also bought 621 class locomotives for hauling lighter weight coal trains.

Currently there are fifteen locomotives in service with Serbian Railways while another two are operated by the rail transport division of the Kolubara coal basin.

== Livery ==
Most of the locomotives currently have a yellow livery, although the final two 621–300 series shunters, bought second-hand from the Czech Republic, have a blue-white livery. After being first bought the locomotives had a red-white livery. Two 621 series locomotives operated by Rail transport of Kolubara coal basin are painted in green-yellow-black livery.

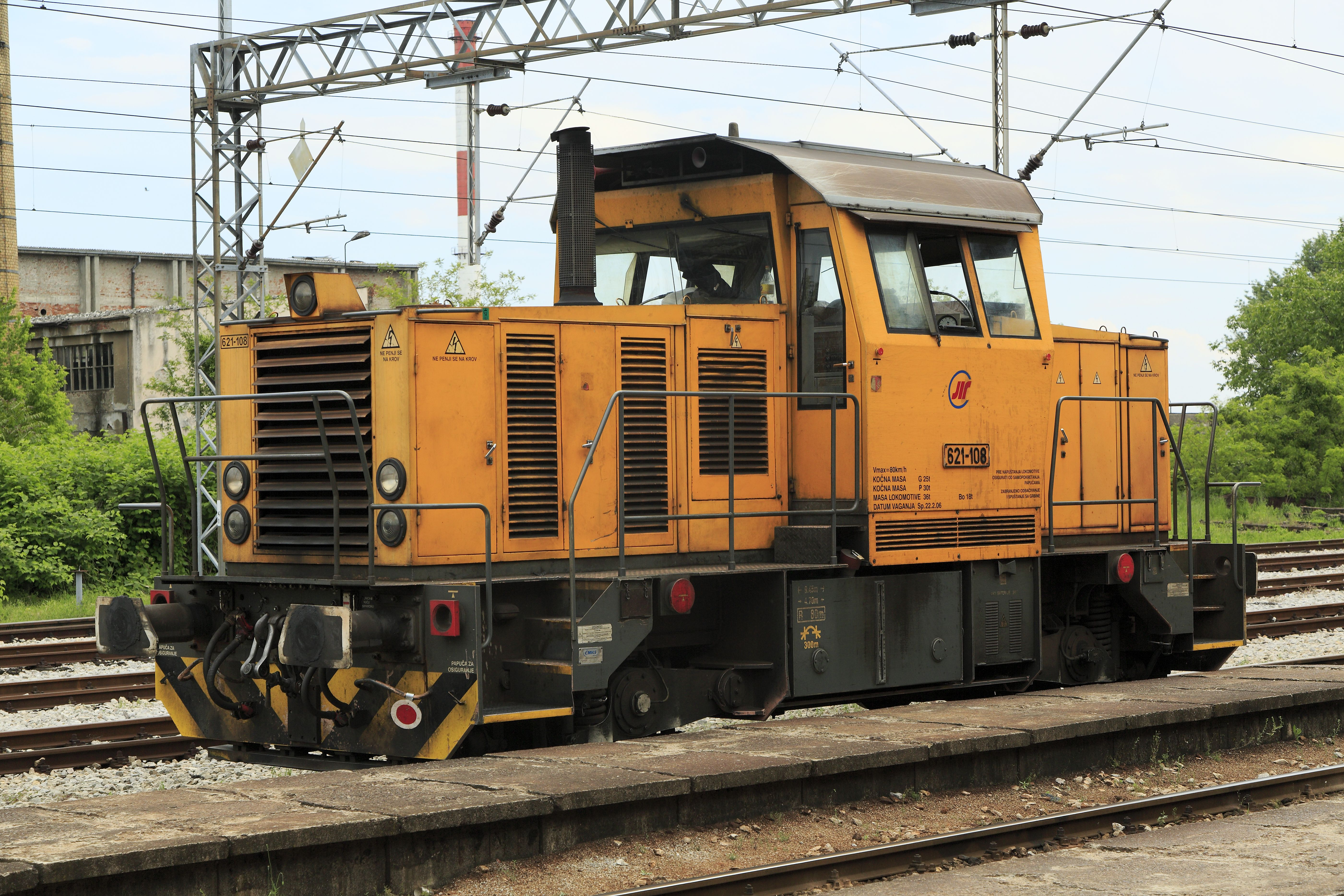
A ŽS series 621 shunting locomotive in the standard yellow livery

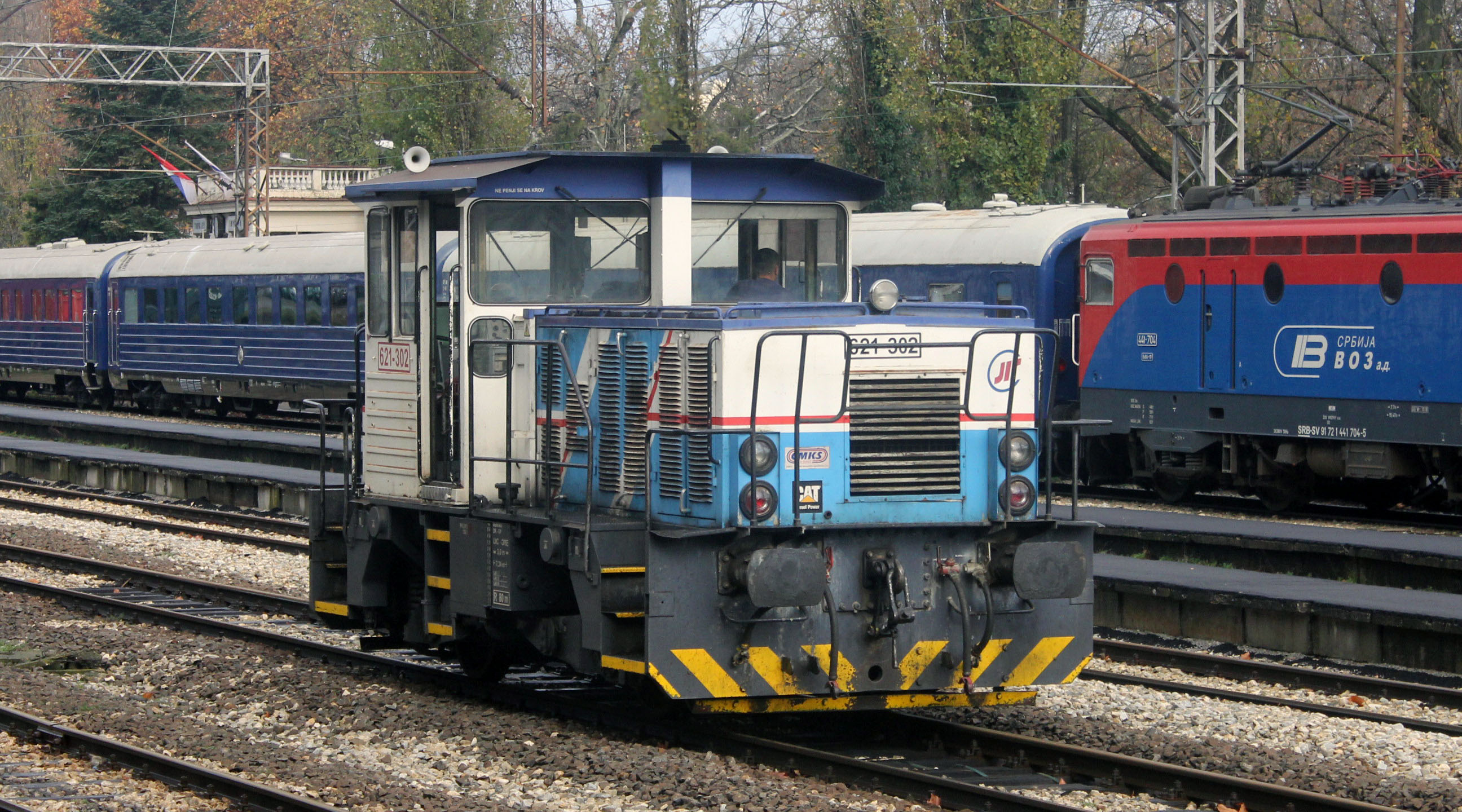
A ŽS series 621-300 shunting locomotive in the blue-white livery

== Nicknames ==
The class has a variety of nicknames. These include "Žuta" (Yellow),"Osica" (little wasp) as they were originally painted in a yellow livery, while the series 300 units are known as "Trafika" (Newsstand).

== In popular culture ==
In the train simulator video game "Derail Valley", the in-game "DE2-480" (or DE2) class of shunter locomotives is based on the ŽS series 621.
