= Mašinska Industrija Niš =

Rolling stock manufacturer

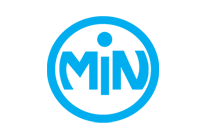
- Official logo
- Native name: Машинска Индустрија Ниш
- Company type: Private
- Industry: Holding
- Founded: 24 March 1998; 28 years ago (Current form); 1884; 142 years ago (Originally founded)
- Fate: Bankruptcy procedure
- Headquarters: Niš, Serbia
- Area served: Serbia
- Key people: Vesna Đošić (Trustee)
- Total assets: ▼€11.35 million (2016)
- Total equity: €0 (2016)
- Number of employees: 0 (2016)

Mašinska industrija Niš (Serbian Cyrillic: MИН Машинска индустрија Ниш; abbr. MIN) or Mechanical Industry Niš, is a Serbian holding corporation headquartered in Niš, Serbia. It is engaged in the energy, mining, process engineering, equipment for agriculture and a railways program. It declared bankruptcy in April 2015.

== History ==
MIN was founded in 1884 as Railways workshop (Serbian: Железничке радионице / Železničke radionice) for the maintenance and repair of rolling stock. It was founded after construction of Belgrade-Niš railway. By the year 1890 the assembly, sawmills, steel foundry, forge, pattern shop and tool room were established. With their integration and the integration of other sectors that have emerged later, the Mechanical Industry Niš (MIN) was founded.

MIN was one of the main companies who maintained Yugoslav Railways diesel locomotives. It has also produced several diesel locomotives series for both railways and industry. At peak MIN employed 17.000 workers.

In April 2015, around 500 employees took severance payments and the company went into bankruptcy procedure.

== Products ==
=== Locomotives ===
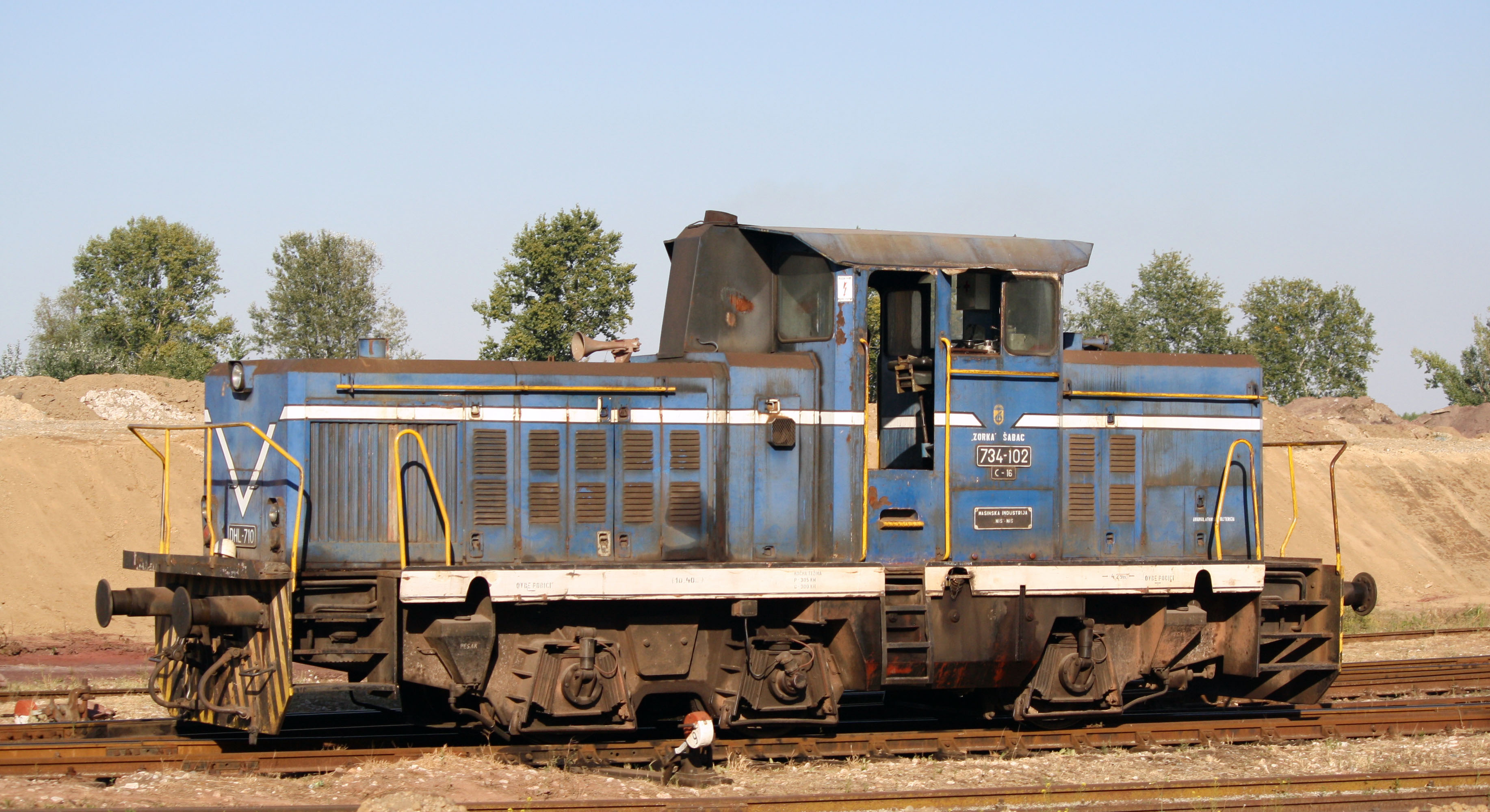
Class 734 industrial diesel locomotive produced made by MIN.

- Diesel-hydraulic locomotive DHL-600 class 734
- Diesel-hydraulic locomotive DHL-650 class 735
- Diesel-hydraulic locomotive DHL-200
- Diesel-hydraulic locomotive DHL-450 U
- Diesel-hydraulic locomotive DHSL-3,0
- Diesel-hydraulic draisine DHD-200 class 915
- Heavy motor draisine TMD-25
- Heavy motor draisine TMD-22
- Light motor draisine LMD-9
- Motor draisine for maintenance of catenary TMD-22 km
- Heavy motor draisine for building and maintenance of catenary TMD-42 km

== Holding members before process of privatization ==
- LIV MIN
- MIN Sivi liv
- MIN Obojeni metali
- MIN Modelara
- MIN Kovačnica
- MIN Presa
- MIN Svrljig
- MIN Izgradnja
- MIN Lokomotiva
- MIN Vagonka
- MIN Čelik
- MIN AGH
- MIN FAM
- MIN Projekat
- MIN Specijalna vozila
- MIN Metal Merošina
- MIN Balkan
- MIN Mont
- MIN Oprema
- MIN Fitip
- MIN Inženjering
- MIN Tehnoproces
- MIN Niš Mont
- MIN OMIN
- MIN Jedinstvo
- MIN Komerc
- MIN Institut
- MIN Inspekt
- MIN Skretnice
- MIN ERC
- MIN Zaštita
- MIN Gas
