= ŽS series 641 =

Class of locomotive

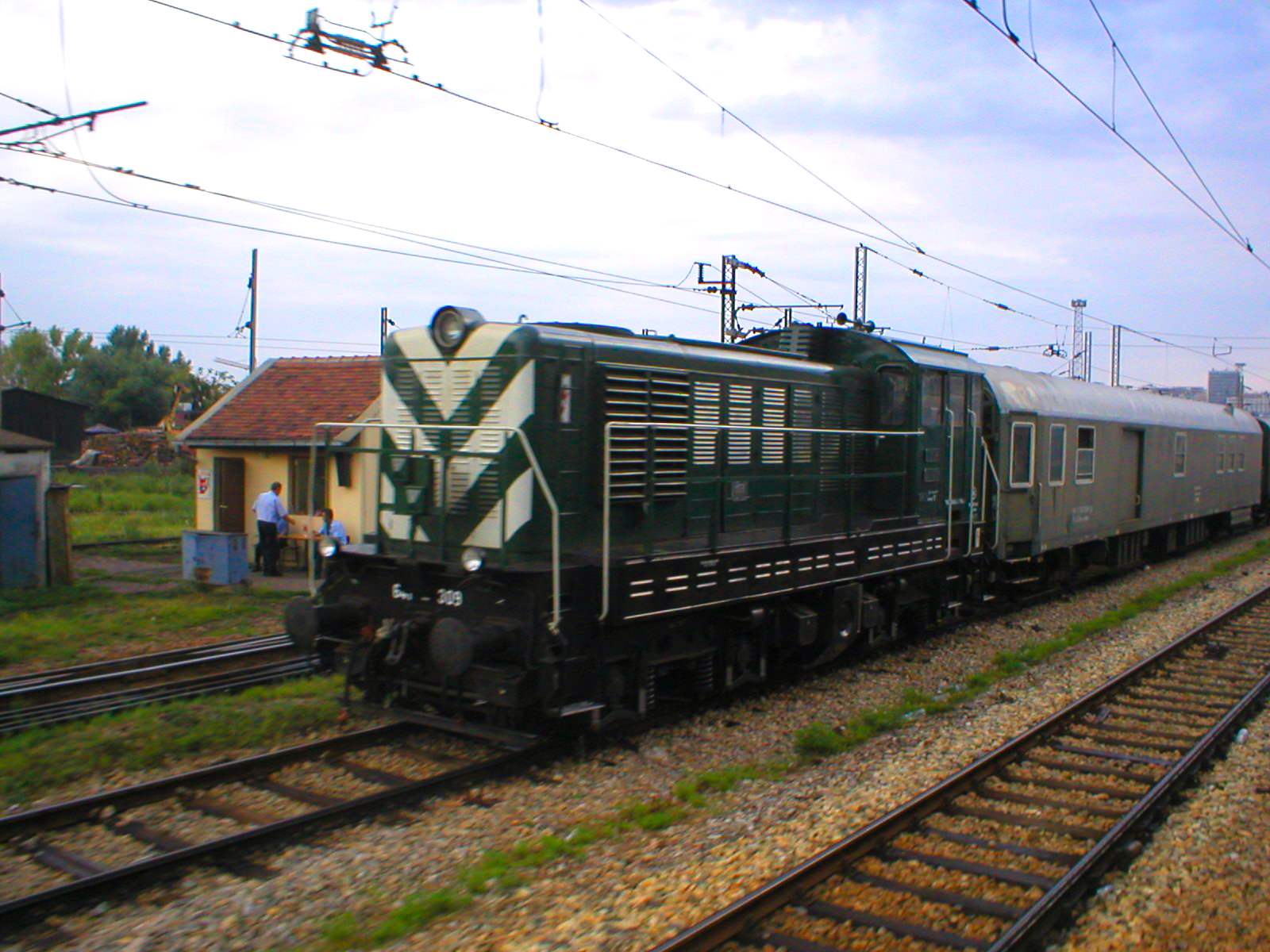
- ŽS 641 locomotive
Type and origin
- Power type: Diesel-electric
- Builder: Ganz-Mavag
- Build date: 1960 - 1985
Specifications
- Configuration
  - UIC: Bo′Bo′
- Wheel diameter: 1,040 mm (40.94 in)
- Length: 11,278 mm (37 ft 0 in)
- Width: (?)
- Height: 4,440 mm (14 ft 7 in) (?)
- Loco weight: 61.67 t (136,000 lb)
- Cylinders: 16
- Transmission: Diesel-electric
Performance figures
- Maximum speed: 80 km/h (50 mph)
- Power output: 441 kW (590 hp)
- Tractive effort: 182.6 kN (41,050 lbf)
Career
- Operators: ŽS
- Class: ŽS 641
- Nicknames: "Mađarica"
- Locale: Serbia

ŽS series 641 is a Serbian code for shunting Hungarian-made diesel-electric locomotive class on Serbian Railways. Formerly it was operated by Yugoslav Railways under designation JŽ series 641. This class has nickname "Mađarica" (Hungarian girl) as they were produced in Hungary.

== History ==
Originally JŽ series 641 was known as MÁV M44, similar to PKP class SM41. This series was produced from 1960 to 1985. First four locomotives were delivered to Yugoslav industry - two to "Đuro Salaj" paper factory from Krško, Slovenia, one to UNIS factory from Vogošća, Bosnia and Herzegovina, and one to Glogovac nickel mine at Kosovo. Other 31 locomotives were delivered to Yugoslav Railways Belgrade section that later become Serbian Railways.

There are today 13 locomotives of this series operated by Serbian Railways. This locomotives are built for heavy shunting, hauling lighter freight trains and also for lighter passenger trains.

== Livery ==
Locomotives have original dark green livery while some overhauled locomotives have orange livery.
