= RA2 =

RA2 may refer to:

- Command & Conquer: Red Alert 2, a video game
- Raccordo autostradale RA2, a road in Campania, Italy
- RA2 Multiple Unit, a Russian diesel train
- Rail Alphabet 2, a British typeface
