= Srbijavoz =

Serbian railway company

Coordinates: 44°48′22.6″N 20°27′32″E

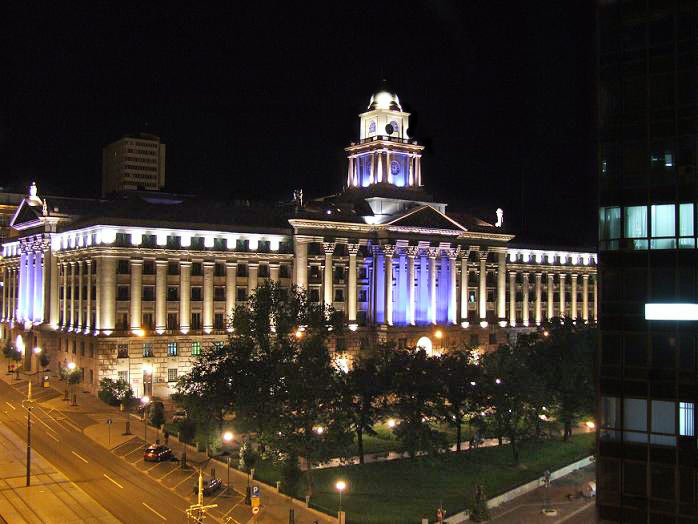
- Srbijavoz headquarters at night
- Native name: Србијавоз
- Formerly: Srbija Voz
- Type: State-owned enterprise
- Industry: Rail transport
- Predecessor: Serbian Railways
- Founded: 10 August 2015; 11 years ago
- Founder: Government of Serbia
- Headquarters: Nemanjina 6, Belgrade, Serbia
- Area served: Serbia
- Key people: Ljubiša Pejičić (General director)
- Services: Transport
- Revenue: ▼€78.91 million (2025)
- Operating income: 218,591,000 Serbian dinar (2023)
- Net income: ▲ (€15.98 million) (2025)
- Total assets: ▼€523.24 million (2025)
- Total equity: ▼€200.33 million (2025)
- Owner: Government of Serbia (100%)
- Number of employees: 2,080 (2025)
- Website: srbijavoz.rs
- Footnotes; Business ID: 21127124; Tax ID: 109108438

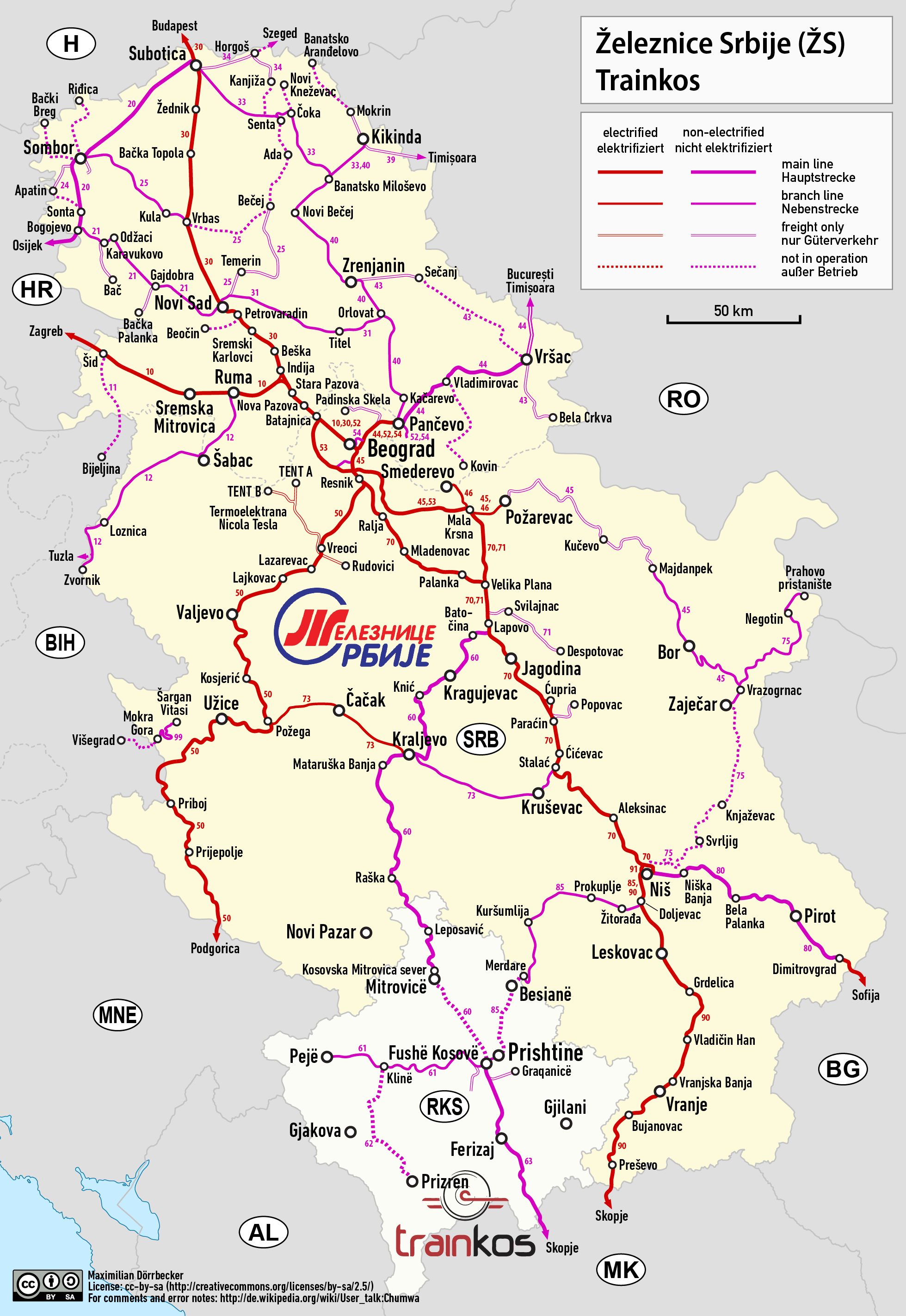
- Map of Srbijavoz rail network

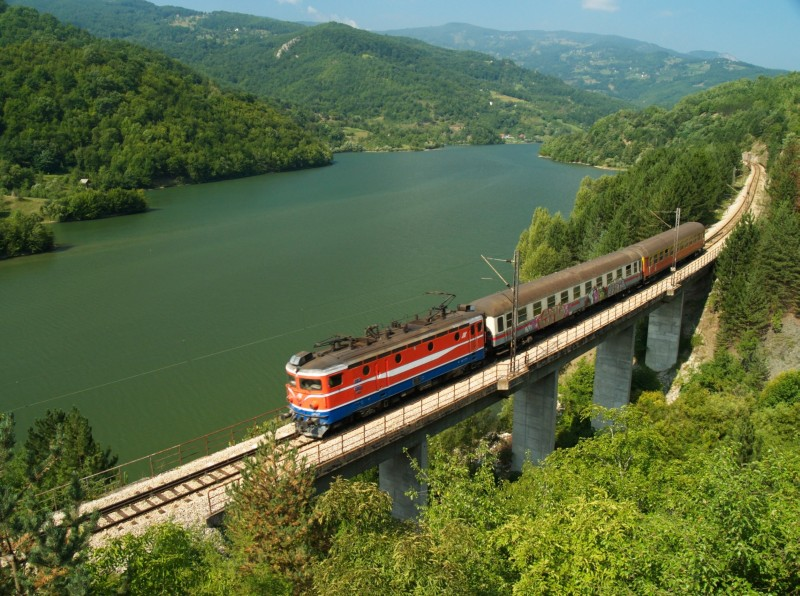
- ŽS 441 electric locomotive pulls a passenger train along the Belgrade–Bar railway line near Priboj.

Srbijavoz (Serbian Cyrillic: Србијавоз; Anglicized: Serbiatrain) is the national passenger railway company of Serbia. Srbijavoz is an associate member of the International Union of Railways (UIC) since 2016.

== History ==
In March 2015, the Government of Serbia announced its plan to establish three new railway companies by splitting the state-owned company Serbian Railways into separate businesses – Srbijavoz (passenger services), Srbija Kargo (freight transport) and Serbian Railways Infrastructure (infrastructure management). Srbijavoz was founded on 10 August 2015.

In February 2019, Srbijavoz temporarily suspended service on the Belgrade–Novi Sad railway, the country's busiest passenger route, due to the line's reconstruction. The line reopened in March 2022 after modernization with the launch of the high-speed "SOKO" service connecting the two most populated Serbian cities in 36 minutes, with trains reaching speeds of up to 200 km/h. The route is 75 km long and it is being extended to cover the segment of railway line between Novi Sad and Subotica (near the border with Hungary), to enable speeds of up to 200 km/h as part of the modernization of the Belgrade-Budapest railway line. Extension of services to Subotica started in October 2025.

Reconstruction and modernization is also planned for the railway line between Belgrade and Niš to enable trains to reach the speeds of up to 200 km/h, between Niš and Preševo (border with North Macedonia) for the speed of 160 km/h and between Niš and Dimitrovgrad for the speed of 120 km/h (border with Bulgaria).

== Passenger transport ==
Srbijavoz inherited the passenger transport operations of Serbian Railways after its founding. Since 2015, it operates train services across the country, including international routes to neighbouring countries and domestic routes (fast, regional and local lines).

=== Domestic railway network ===
The Serbian railway system consists of 3,739 km of rails of which 295 km is double track (7.9% of the network). Some 1,279 km of track (33.6% of the network) is electrified. Serbia has rail links with all neighbouring countries.

Railroads are categorized as "main lines", "regional lines", "local lines" or "manipulative lines". Below is a list of main lines in Serbia:

No.	Route	Length	Tracks	Electrification	Notes
1	Belgrade – Ruma – Border with Croatia near Šid	120 km	2	yes	It is shared track between Belgrade and Stara Pazova with Railway line 4.
2	Belgrade – Niš – Border with North Macedonia near Preševo	398 km	1/2	yes	Two tracks are between Velika Plana and Stalać as well as between Đunis and Niš. Modernization and reconstruction is planned to start in 2026 up to high-speed rail of maximum 200 km/h between Belgrade and Niš.
3	Belgrade – Mala Krsna – Velika Plana	102 km	1	yes	
4	Belgrade – Novi Sad – Border with Hungary near Subotica	183 km	2	yes	High-speed (200 km/h) rail is opened between Belgrade and Novi Sad since 19 March 2022. Serbia launched regular high-speed train services between Belgrade and Subotica on Wednesday, October 8, 2025 (border with Hungary).
5	Niš – Pirot – Border with Bulgaria near Dimitrovgrad	104 km	1	no	Reconstruction, electrification and modernization started in November 2023 and will last next tree and a half years for the maximum speed of 120 km/h.
6	Belgrade – Pančevo – Border with Romania near Vršac	102 km	1/2	partially	There are 2 tracks that are electrified between Belgrade and Pančevo.
7	Belgrade – Valjevo – Užice – Border with Montenegro near Prijepolje	299 km	1	yes	
8	Lapovo – Kragujevac – Kraljevo – Administrative line with Kosovo & Metohija near Rudnica	153 km	1	no	
9	Subotica – Sombor – Border with Croatia near Bogojevo	87 km	1	no	

==== Inter-City Trains ====
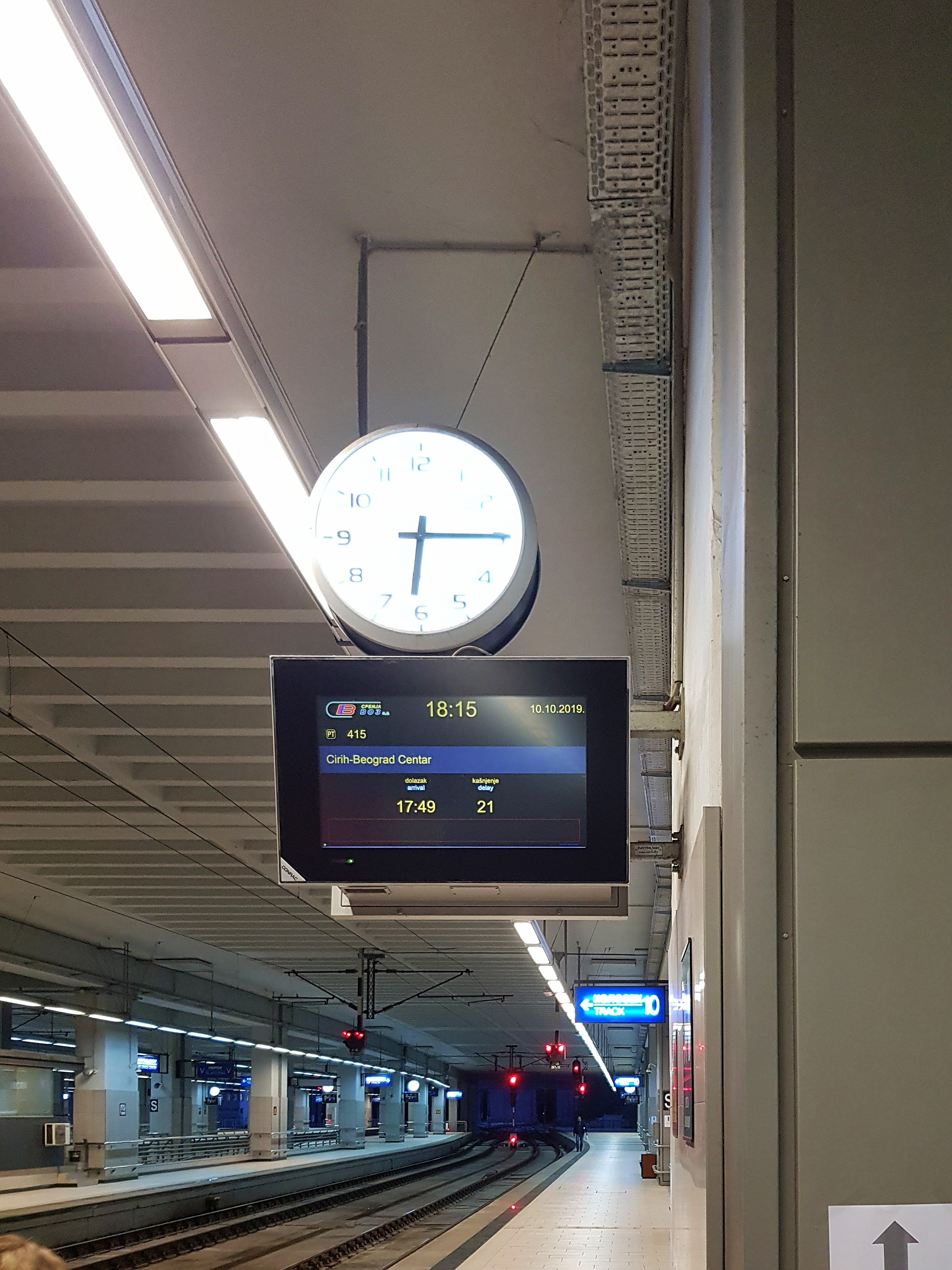
Signs indicating the direction of facilities and platform display, Belgrade Centre Railway Station

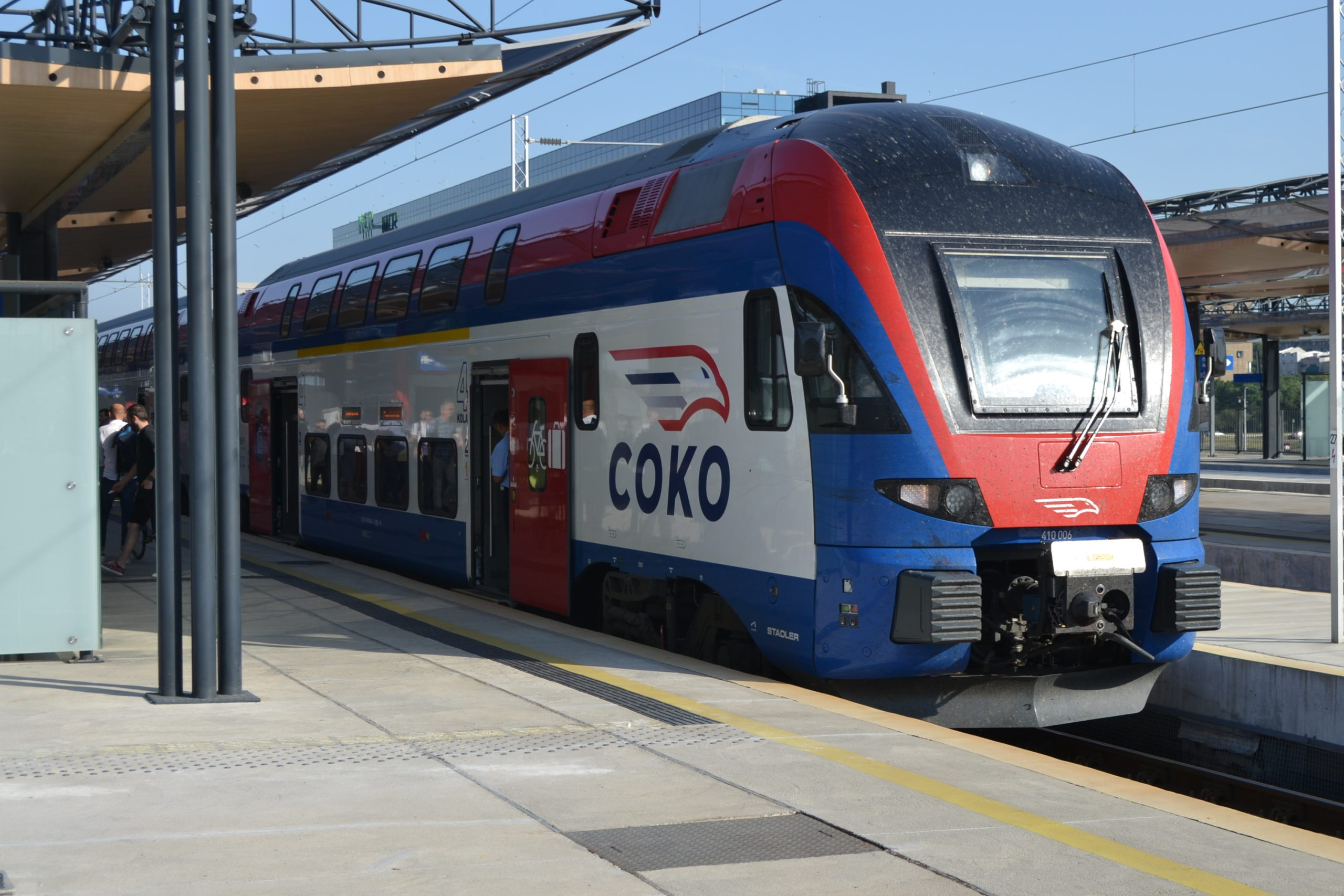
Srbijavoz InterCity line, fast train Soko ŽS 410, New Belgrade railway station.

Srbija Voz operates a high-speed service called SOKO ("falcon" in Serbian) from Belgrade to Subotica with KISS 200 electric multiple units that reaches speeds of up to 200 km/h and covers the route in 79 minutes. This rail connection is the busiest one in Serbia.

==== Regional Trains ====
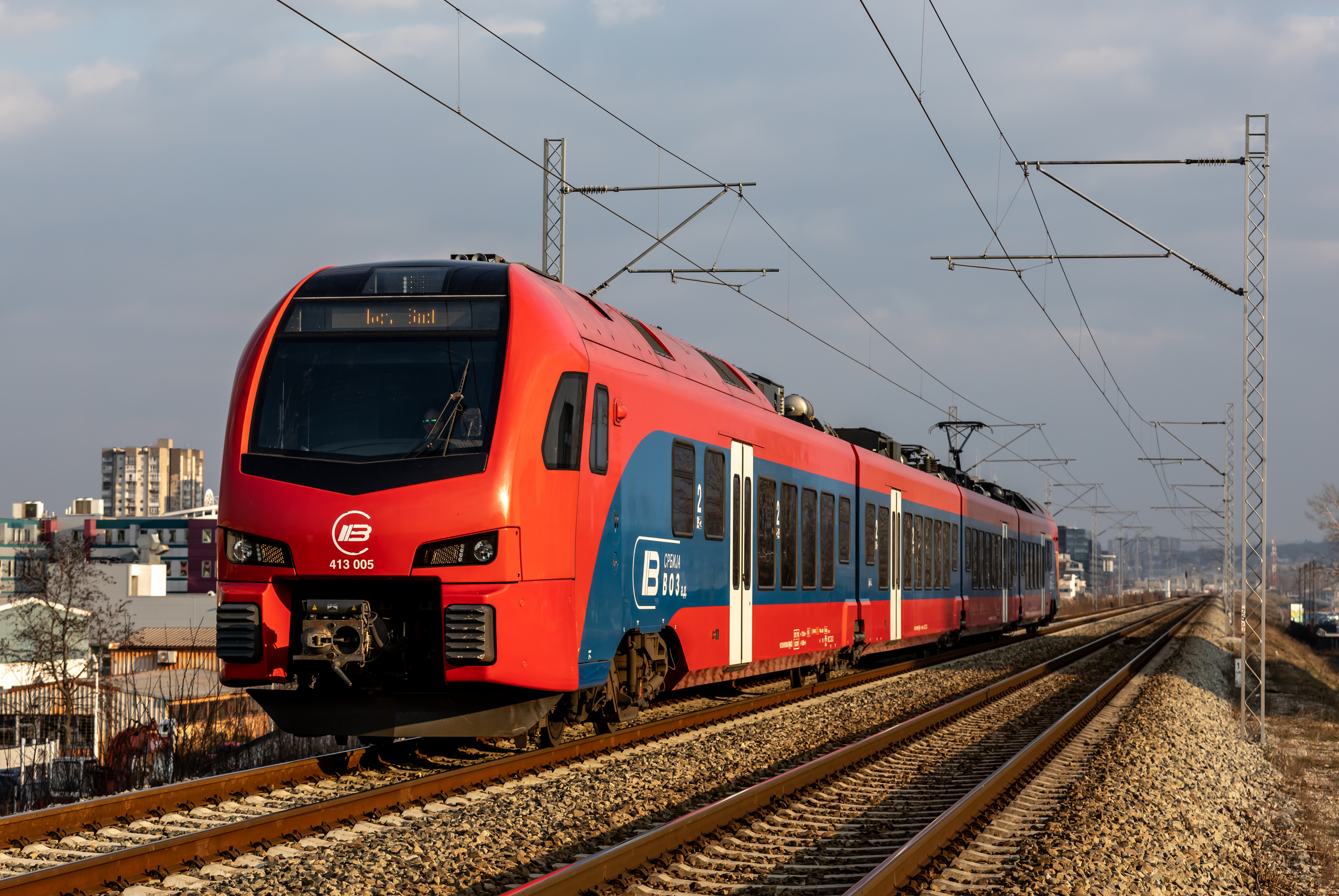
Srbijavoz Regio train FLIRT3, Railway station Tošin Bunar

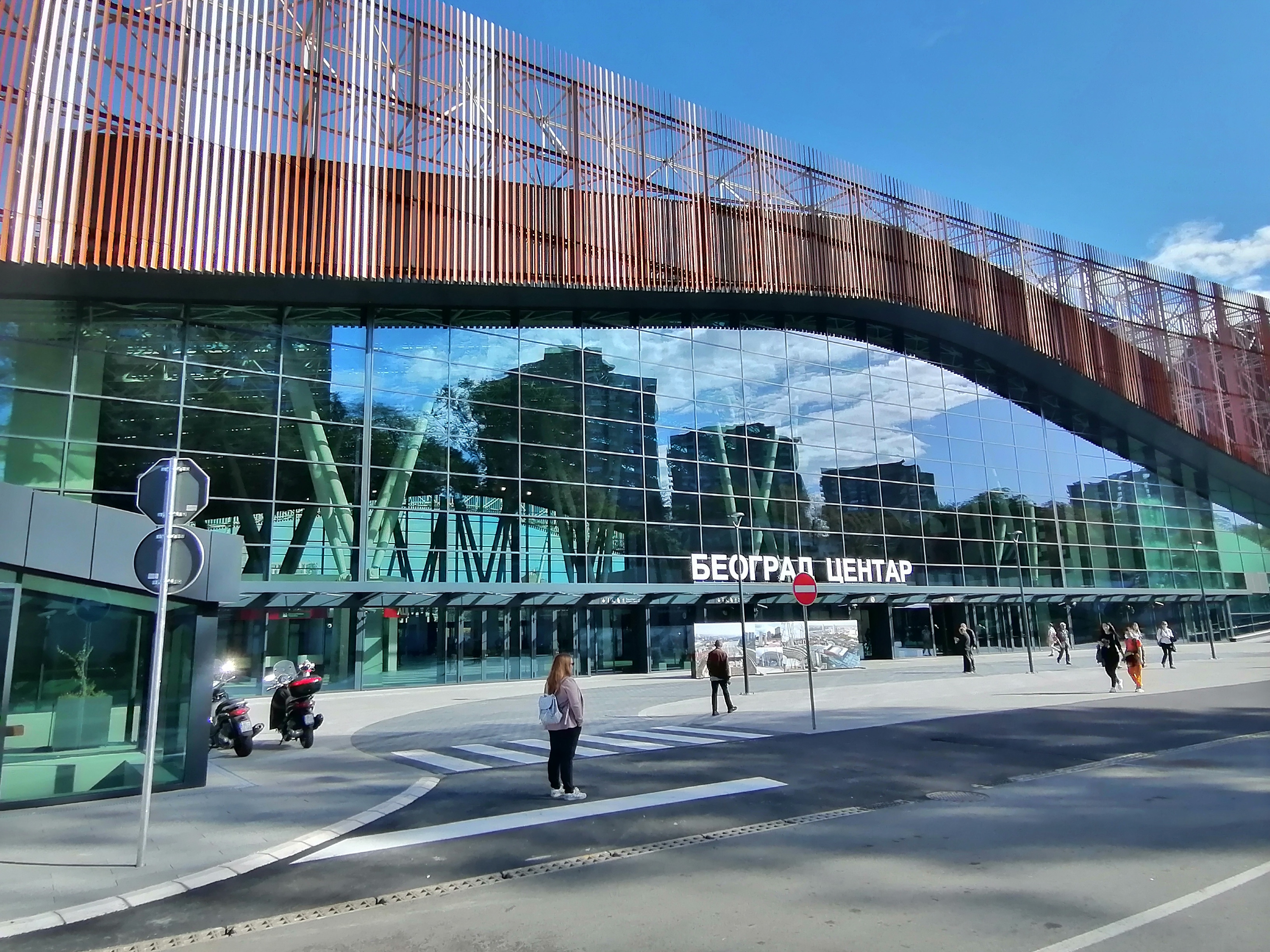
Belgrade Centre Railway Station

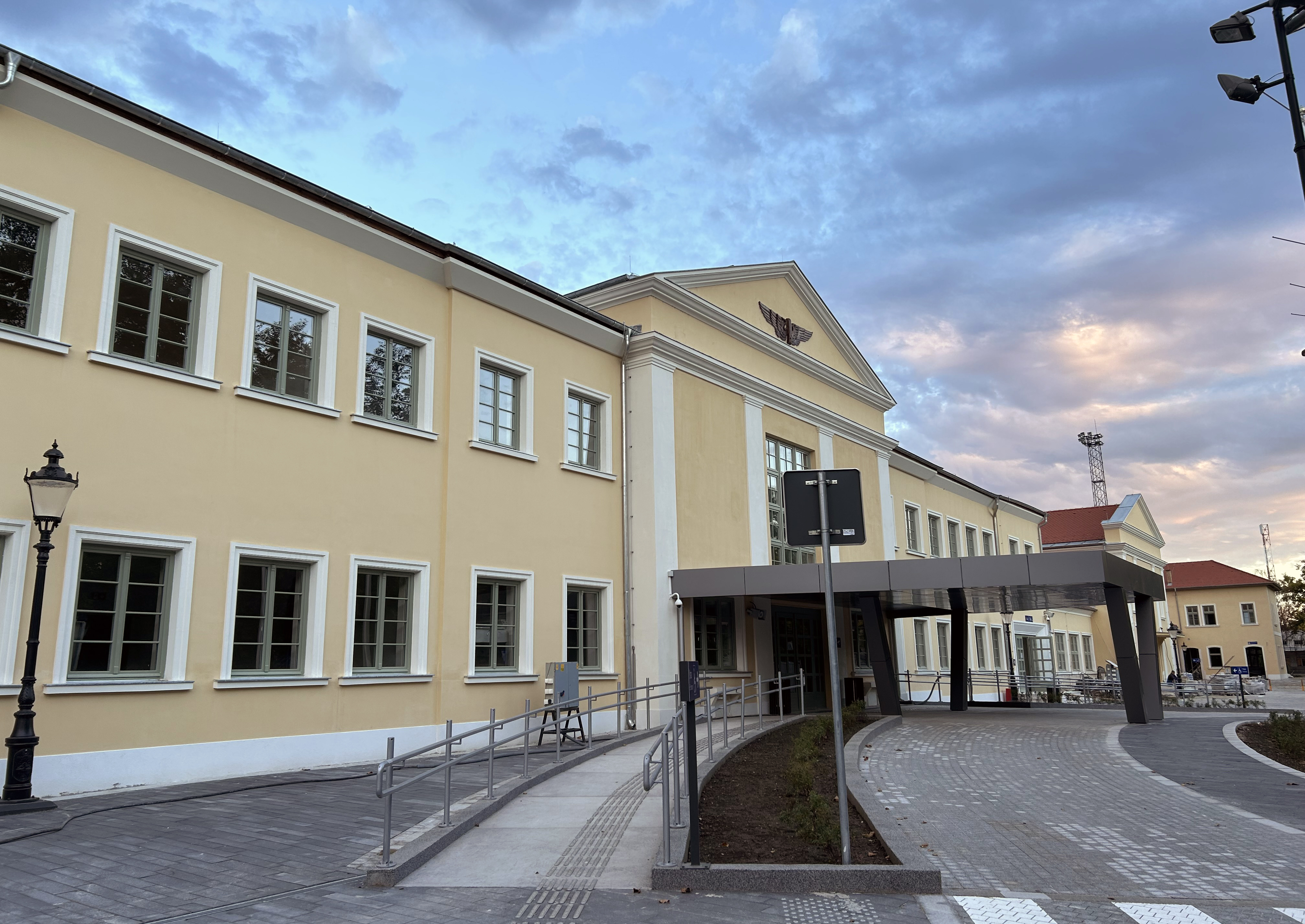
Subotica Central Railway Station, is the northernmost railway station in Serbia and one of the country's five principal railway hubs.

The Regio is a service that offers domestic connections to Novi Sad, Subotica, Niš, Zrenjanin, Valjevo, Kraljevo, Užice, Sombor, Požarevac, Zaječar, Vršac, Kikinda, Prokuplje and Ruma. FLIRT3 EMU of Class 413 provide the service on electrified lines, while on non-electrified lines transport is provided by RA2 DMU of Class 711.

Regio trains also used to operate on the route from Kraljevo to North Mitrovica in North Kosovo, which was a domestic route from Serbia's point of view, but an international route from Kosovo’s point of view.

=== International railway network ===
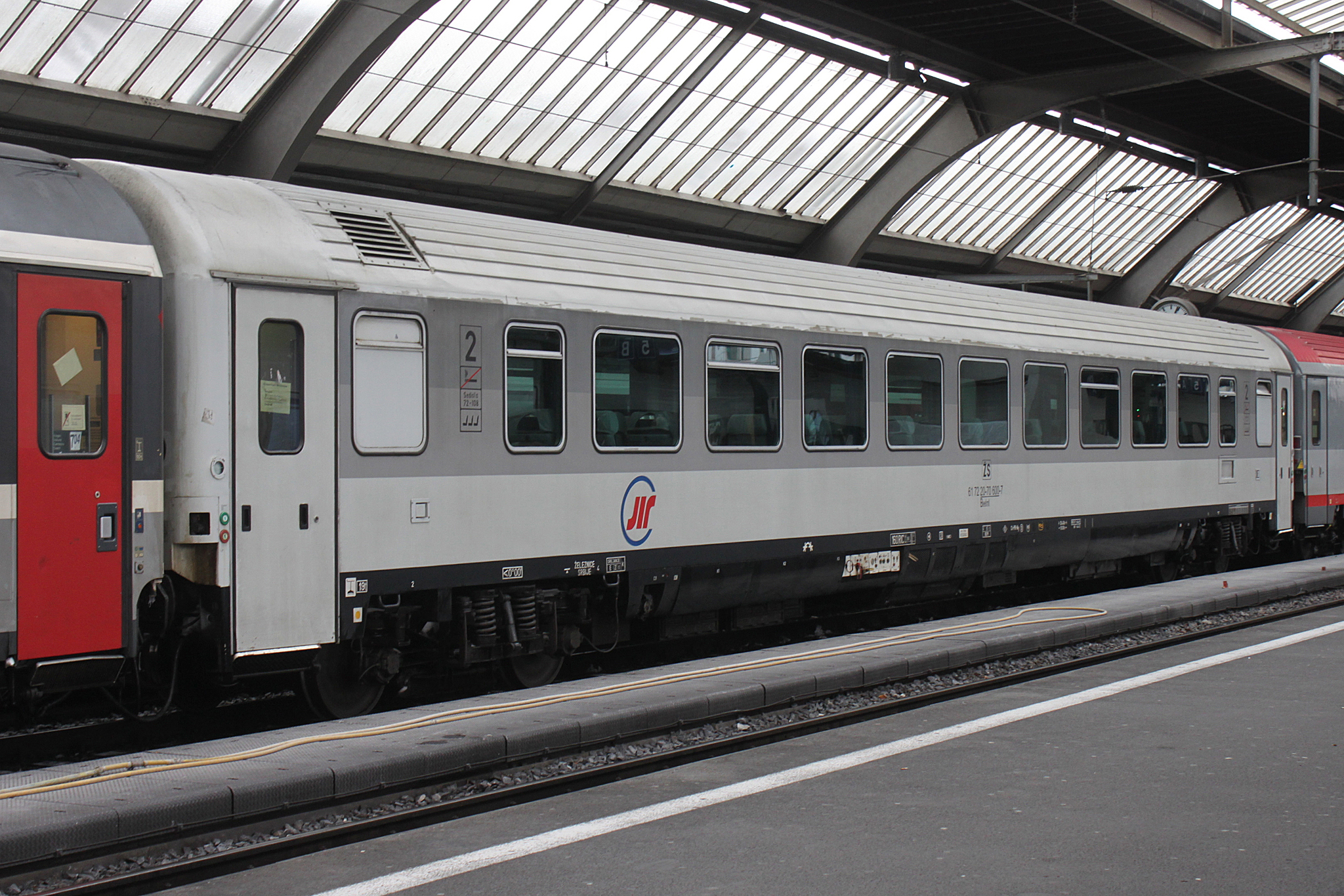
Srbijavoz International Train exterior

==== Former ====
Srbijavoz previously operated EuroCity trains on the following routes:

- Avala connecting Belgrade to Vienna, Austria
- Beograd connecting Belgrade to Budapest, Hungary
- Balkan connecting Belgrade to Sofia, Bulgaria
- Hellas connecting Belgrade to Thessaloniki, Greece

Srbijavoz operated Non-EuroCity trains on the following routes:

- Balkan connecting Belgrade to Sarajevo, Bosnia and Herzegovina (discontinued in 2012)

==== Current ====
Remaining international rail routes are:

- Tara connecting Belgrade to Bar, Montenegro
- Lovćen connecting Belgrade to Bar, Montenegro
- Regional train connecting Subotica to Szeged, Hungary

== Rolling stock ==
=== Electric locomotives ===
- ŽS 441 with a total of: 11 units in service (22 total)
- ŽS 461 with a total of: 1 unit in service (4 total)

=== Diesel locomotives ===
- ŽS 621 with a total of: 5 units in service (5 total)
- ŽS 661 with a total of: 2 units in service (3 total)
- ŽS 666 with a total of: 2 units in units (4 total)

=== Electric trainsets ===
- ŽS 410 with a total of: 3 units in service (3 total) - Stadler KISS
- ŽS 411 (series 0) with a total of: 5 units in service (5 total) - CRRC Tiger
- ŽS 411 (series 500) with a total of: 9 units on order - CRRC trainsets for EXPO 2027
- ŽS 412 with a total of: 11 units in service (20 total) - RVR ER31
- ŽS 413 with a total of: 39 units in service (39 total) - Stadler FLIRT

=== Diesel trainsets ===
- ŽS 710 with a total of: 4 units in service (6 total) - Fiat-Kalmar Y1
- ŽS 711 with a total of: 25 units in service (39 total) - Metrovagonmash RA2

=== Passenger carriages ===
- Passenger cars - "open" or "compartment" with a total of: 364 units
- Sleeping cars with a total of: 52 units
- Couchette cars with a total of: 63 units
- Dining cars with a total of: 15 units

== See also ==
- Transport in Serbia
- Serbian Railways
- Serbian Railways Infrastructure
- Srbija Kargo
