= EM4 Electric Trainset =

Type of Russian railway train

EM4 ЭМ4
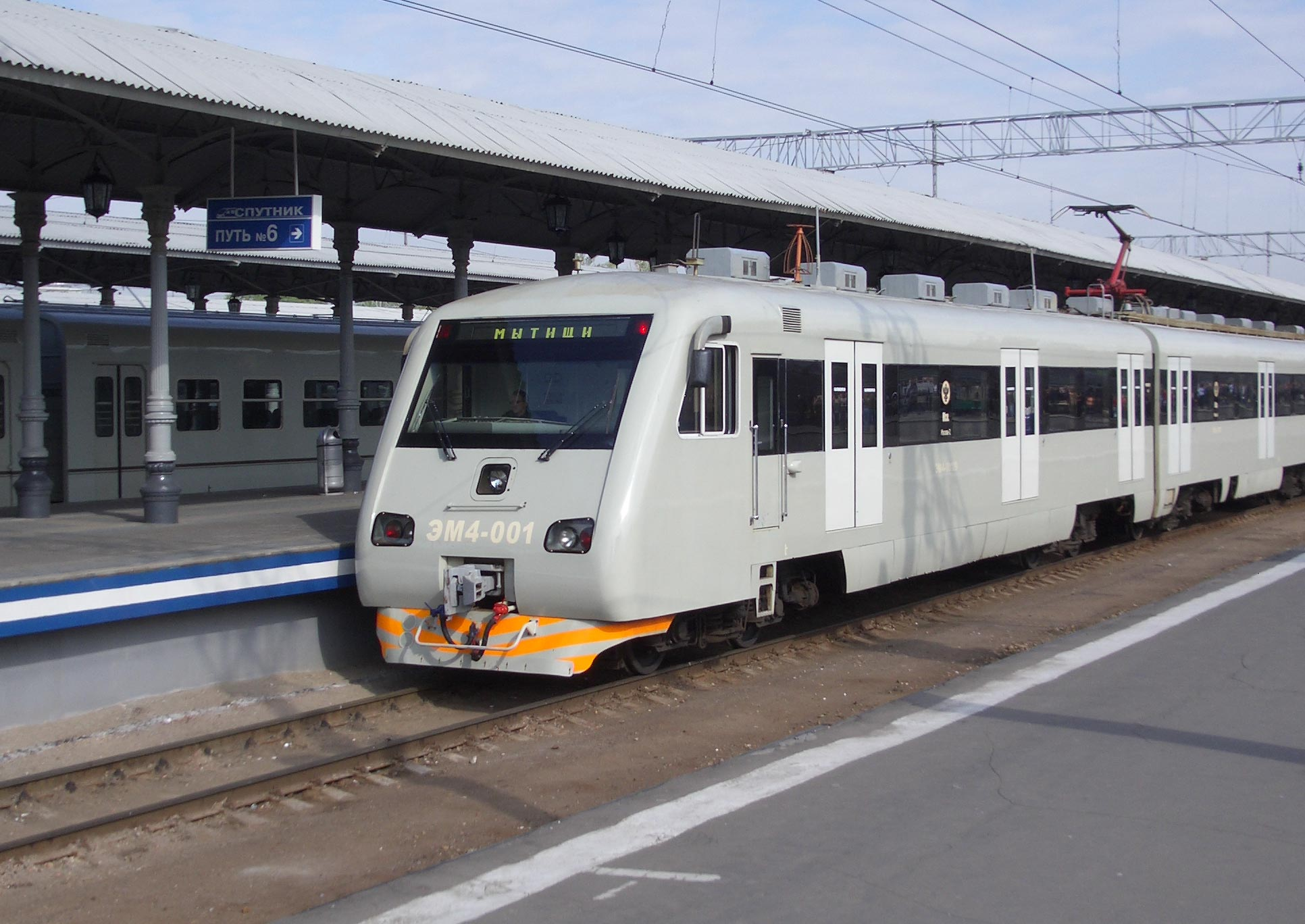
- EM4 Electric Trainset
- Manufacturer: JSC "Spetsremont" factory
- Constructed: 2003 - 2006
- Operators: Russian Railways
- Lines served: 3+

Specifications
- Car body construction: steel, aluminium
- Maximum speed: 120 km/h (75 mph)
- Weight: 297 t (292 long tons; 327 short tons)
- Track gauge: 1,520 mm (4 ft 11 27/32 in) Russian gauge

EM4 Electric Trainsets (Cyrillic ЭМ4, known as "Sputnik") were produced from 2003 to 2006 by the JSC "Spetsremont" factory. Their cars have a common interior space. Each car has three pairs of sliding doors propped-designed only for the high platforms. EM4 "Sputniks” have operated on the following rapid suburban routes:
• Moscow - Mytischi – Pushkino,
• Moscow - Mytischi - Bolshevo,
• Moscow - Lyubertsy 1 – Ramenskoye

== Gallery ==
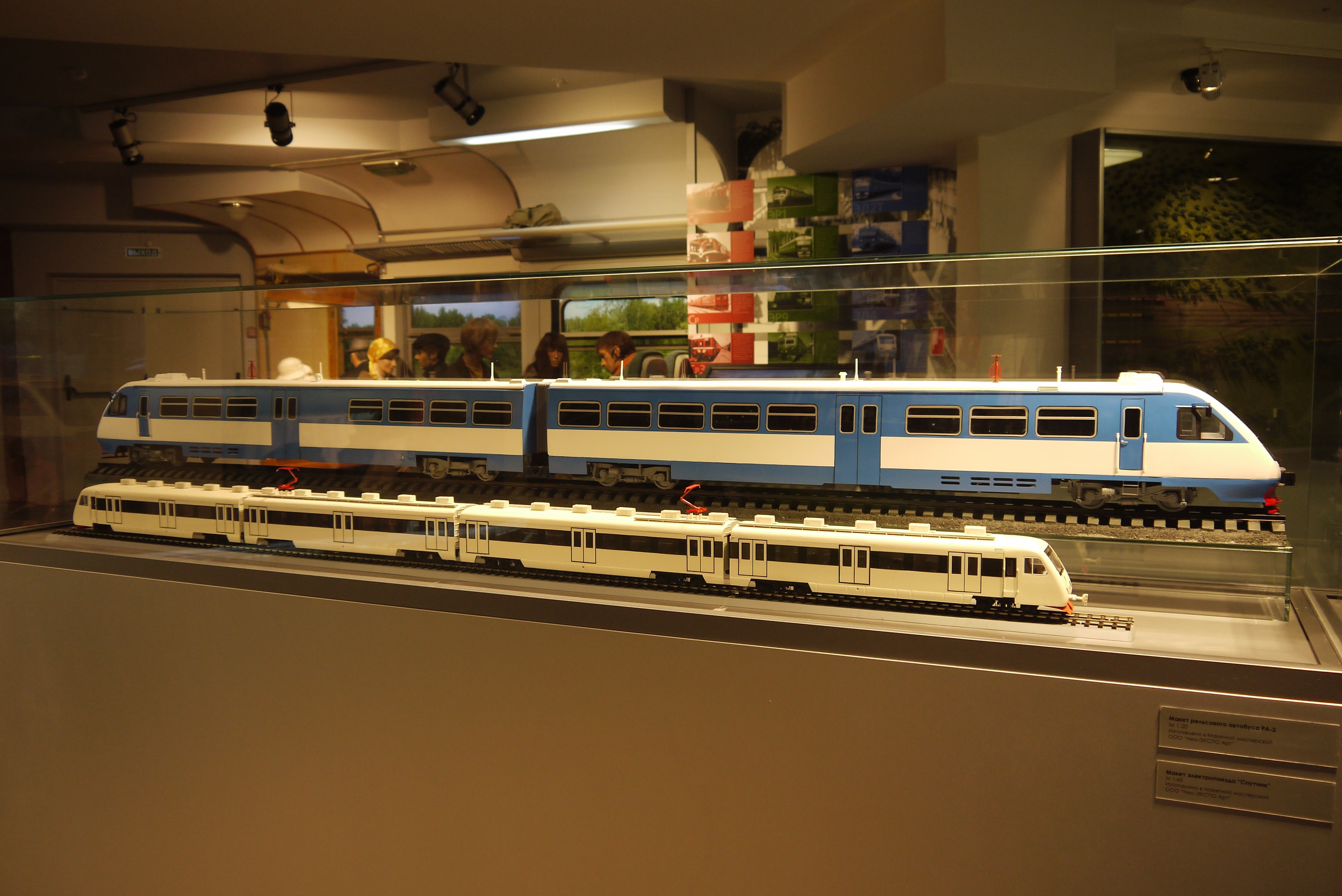
A Scale Models of an EM4 “Sputnik” Electric Multiple Unit and a RA2 Multiple Unit at the Museum of the Moscow Railway

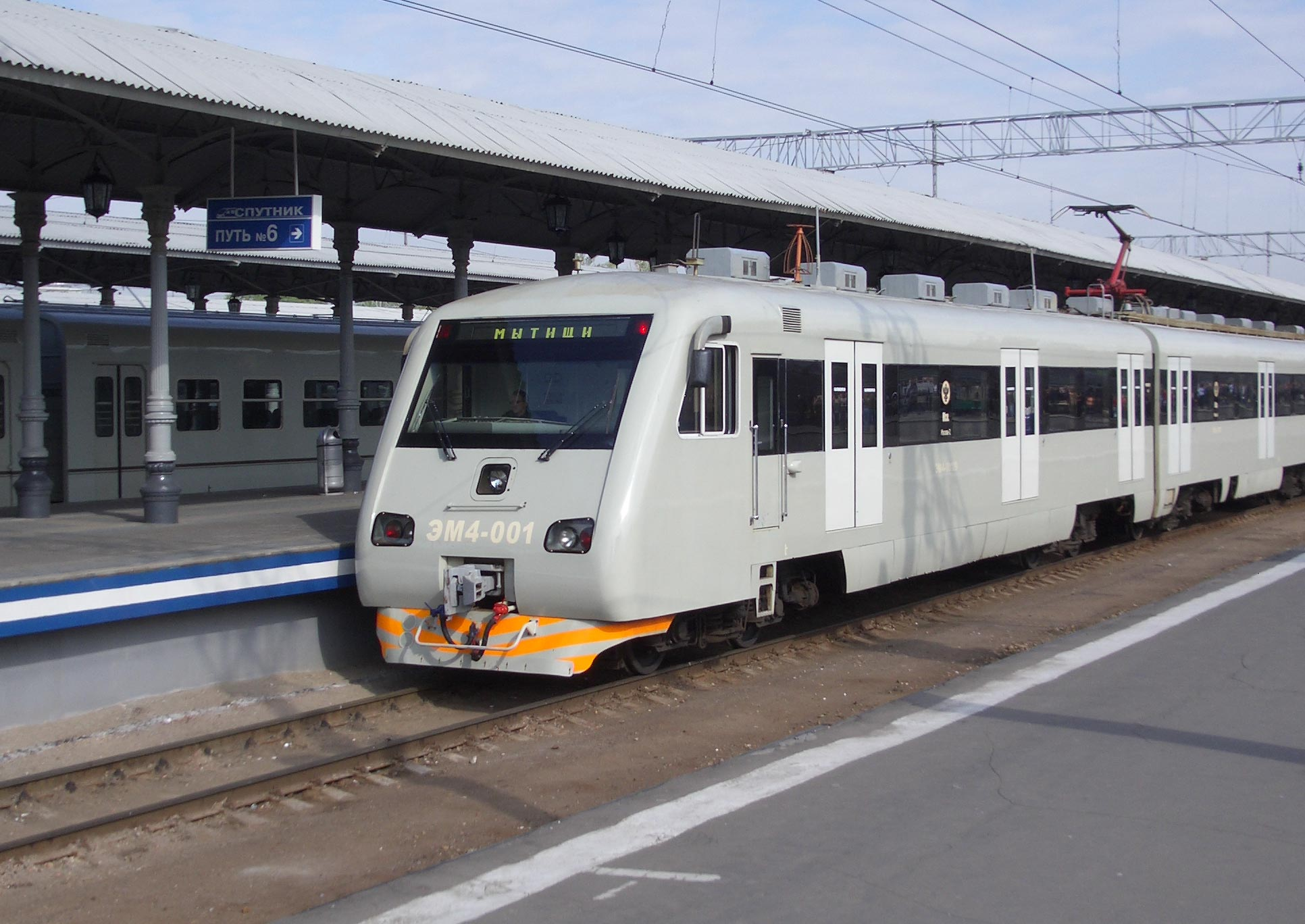
EM4-001 «Sputnik» at Yaroslavsky Rail Terminal, Moscow

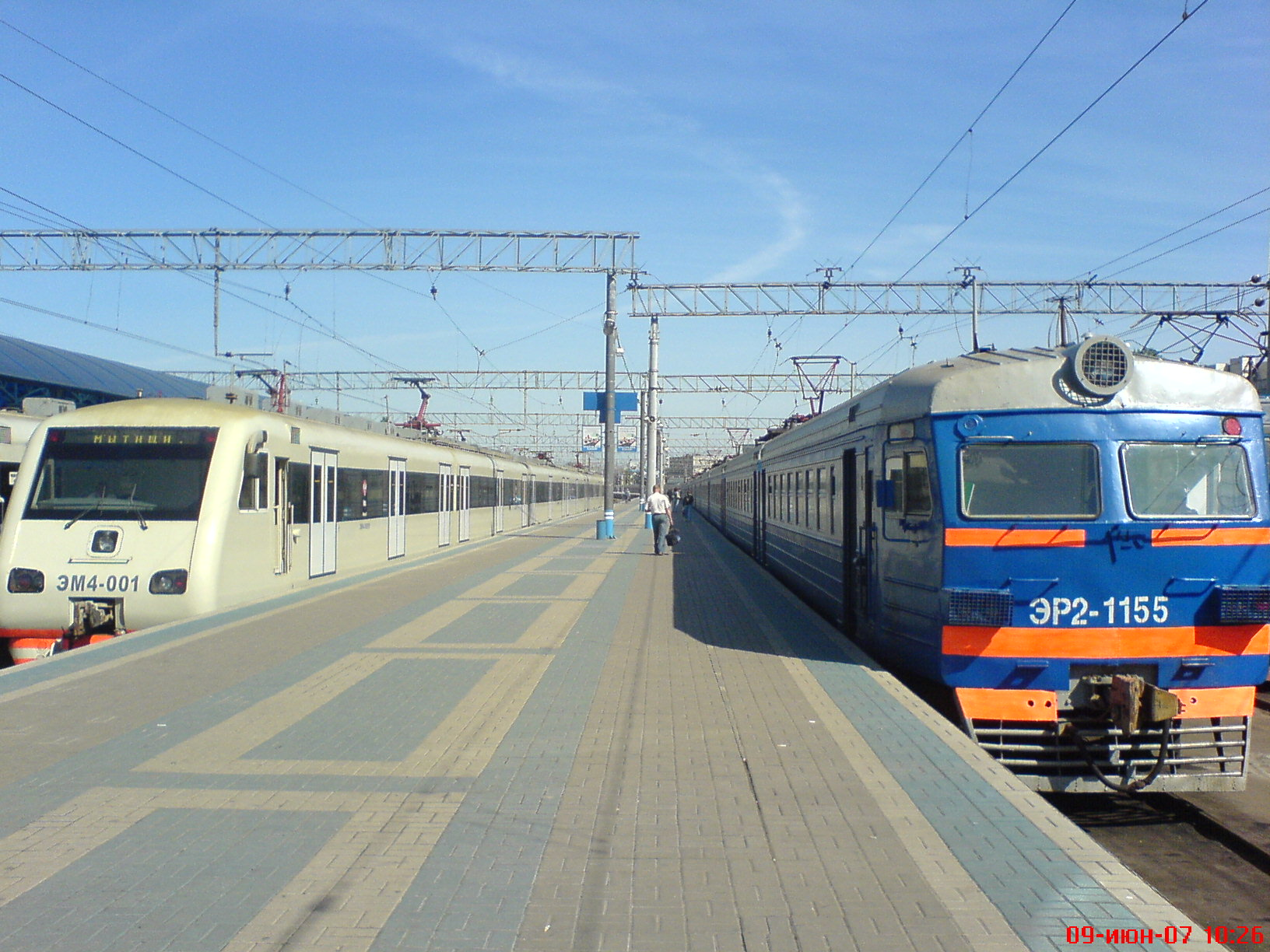
EM4 and ER2 electric trainset at Yaroslavsky Rail Terminal

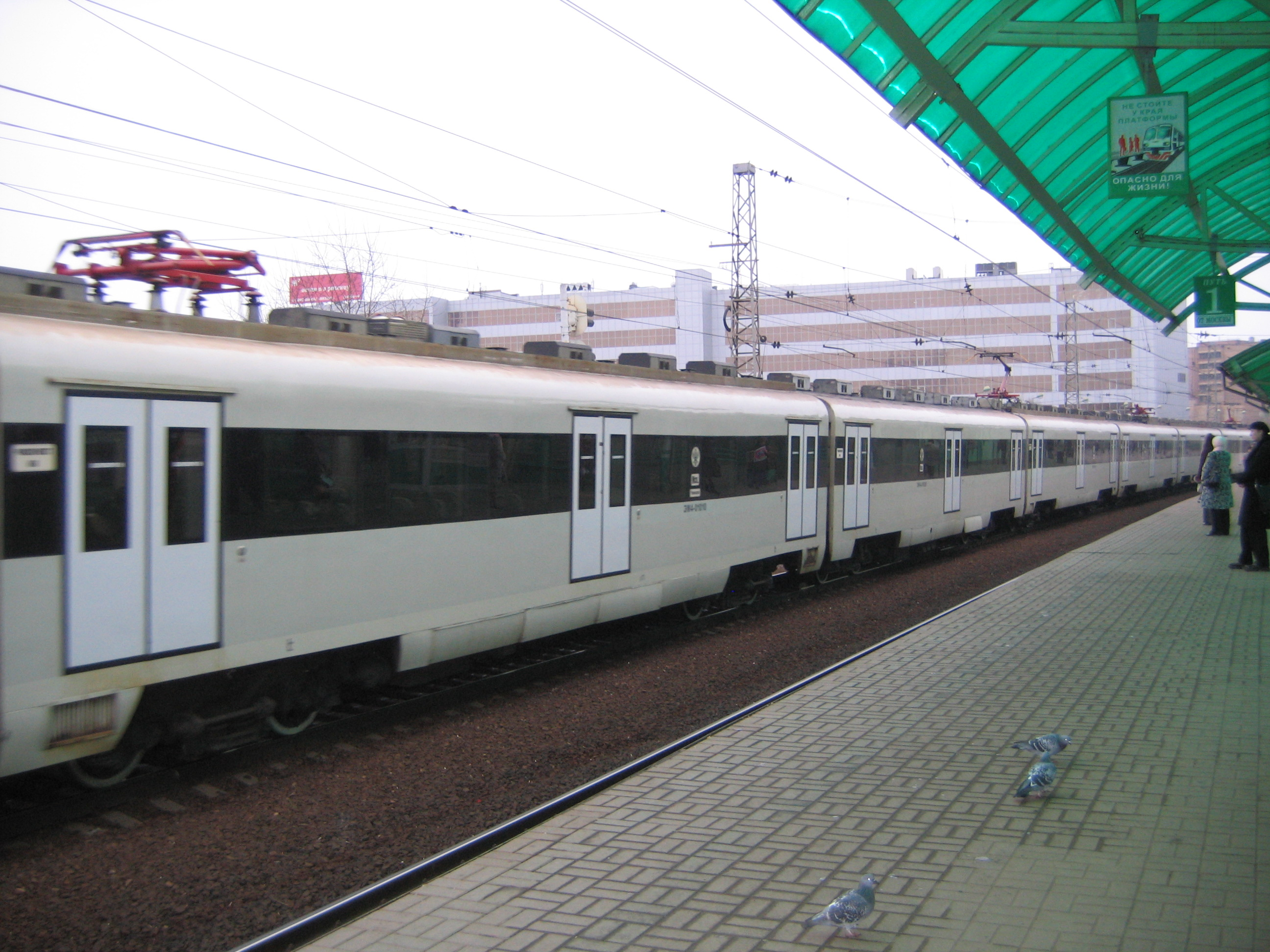
EM4 electrical multiple unit at Elektrozavodskaya railway station

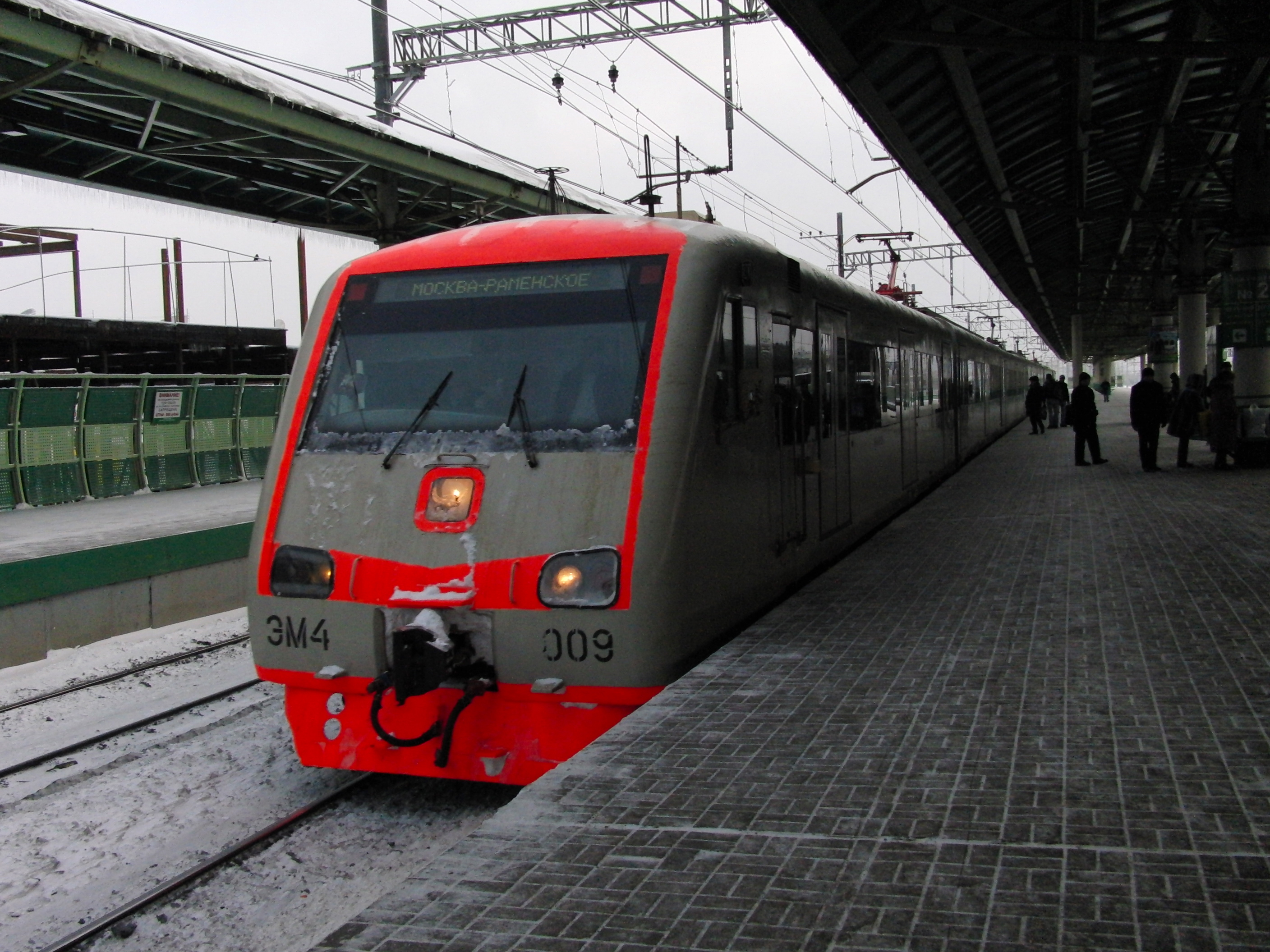
EM4 electrical multiple unit at Vykhino

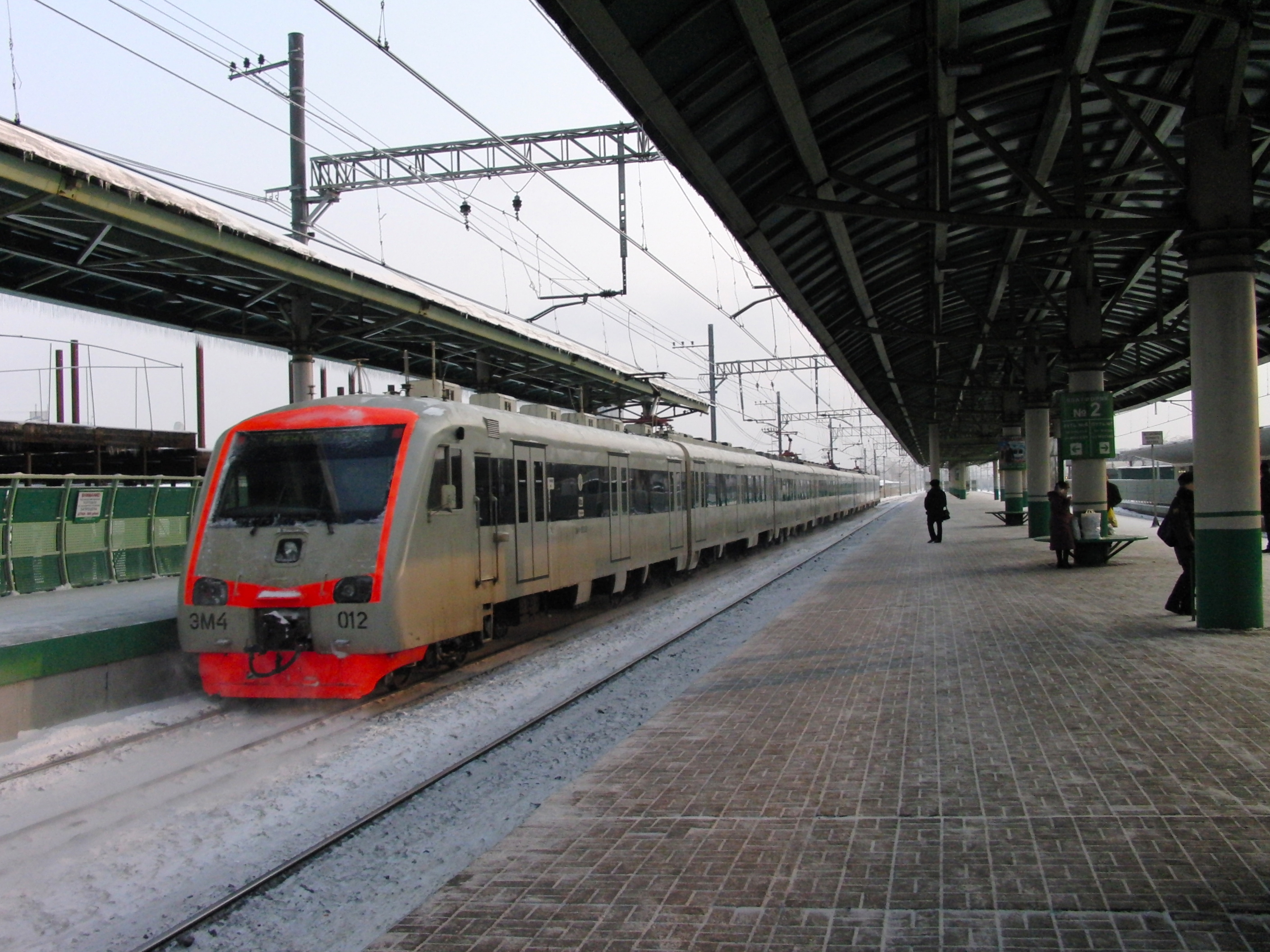
EM4 electrical multiple unit at Vykhino

== See also ==
- The Museum of the Moscow Railway, at Paveletsky Rail Terminal, Moscow
- Rizhsky Rail Terminal, Moscow
- Varshavsky Rail Terminal, St.Petersburg
- Finland Station, St.Petersburg
- History of rail transport in Russia
