= RA2 multiple unit =

Russian diesel train

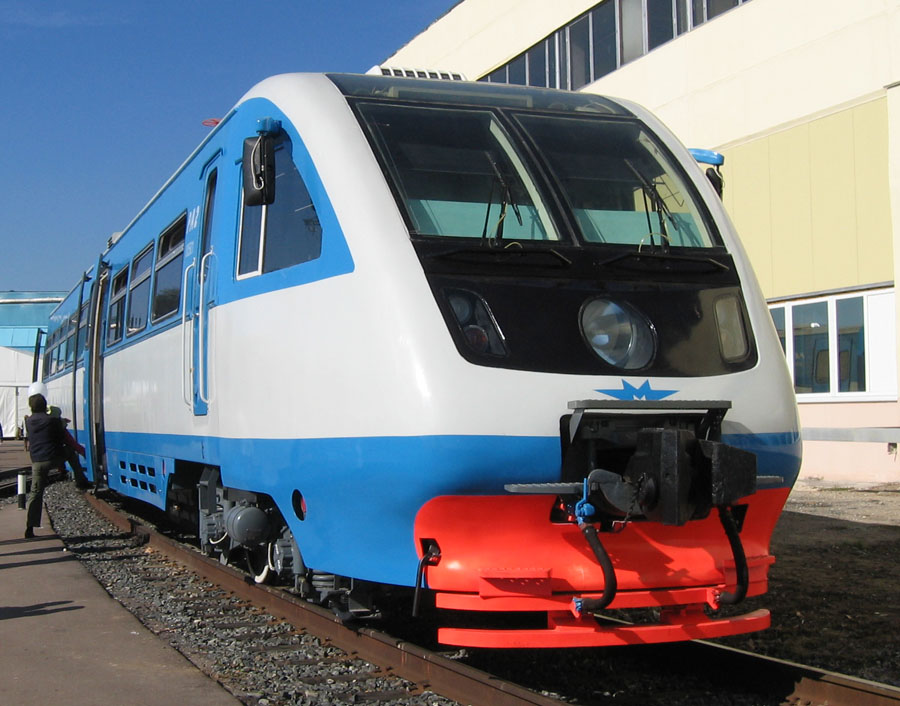
- RA2 Multiple Unit
- In service: 2006–
- Manufacturers: Metrovagonmash, Russia
- Constructed: 2005–2015
- Entered service: from 2006
- Number built: at least 115
- Fleet numbers: known: 001-095, 101-120
- Capacity: Power cars: 68 passengers; Trailer cars: 86 passengers
- Operators: Russian Railways, Ulaanbaatar Railbus, Lithuanian Railways, Ukrainian Railways
- Depot: over 50 depots

Specifications
- Width: 3.140 m (10 ft 3 5/8 in)
- Maximum speed: 100 km/h (62 mph)
- Weight: Power cars: 44 t (43 long tons; 49 short tons); Trailer cars: 37 t (36 long tons; 41 short tons)
- Prime mover: MTU
- Engine type: Diesel
- Power output: 2 × 350 kW (470 hp)
- Tractive effort: 250 kN (56,200 lbf)
- Transmission: Hydraulic by Voith
- Auxiliaries: 50 V
- Braking system: Air
- Coupling system: SA3
- Track gauge: 1,520 mm (4 ft 11 27/32 in) Russian gauge

The RA-2 Multiple Unit (Russian: РА2) is a Russian diesel multiple unit (railbus), type 2. The RA-2 is produced by Metrovagonmash and is designed for passenger transportation on non-electrified railway lines with high traffic, as well as suburban and inter-regional communication. They can be operated as a part of only two head end cars, and with one or two trailing cars. The head / end cars have one exit from the cab for high platforms, and one in the centre of the car high and low platforms.

== Gallery ==
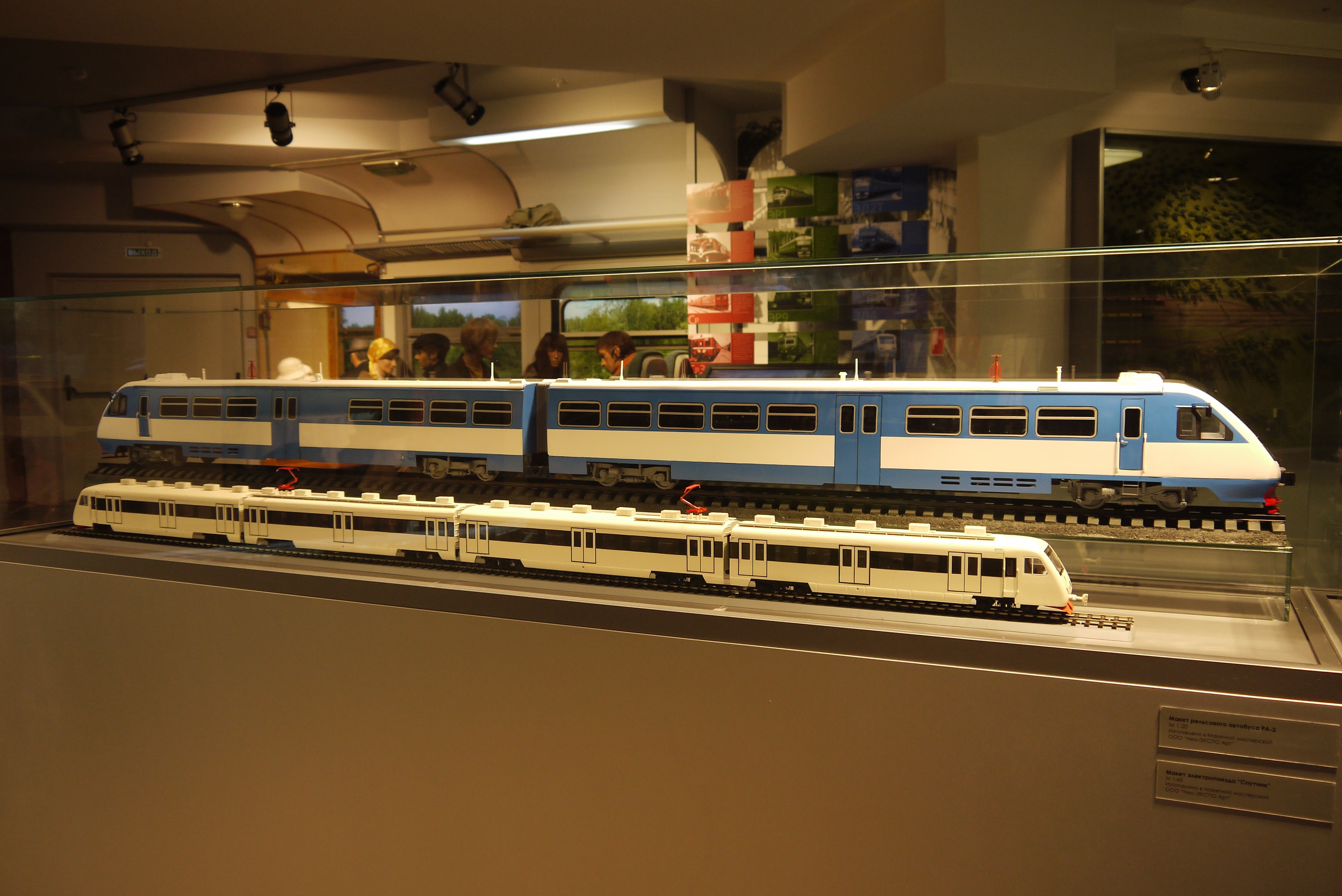
Scale models of an EM4 Electric Trainset and an RA2 Multiple Unit at the Museum of the Moscow Railway

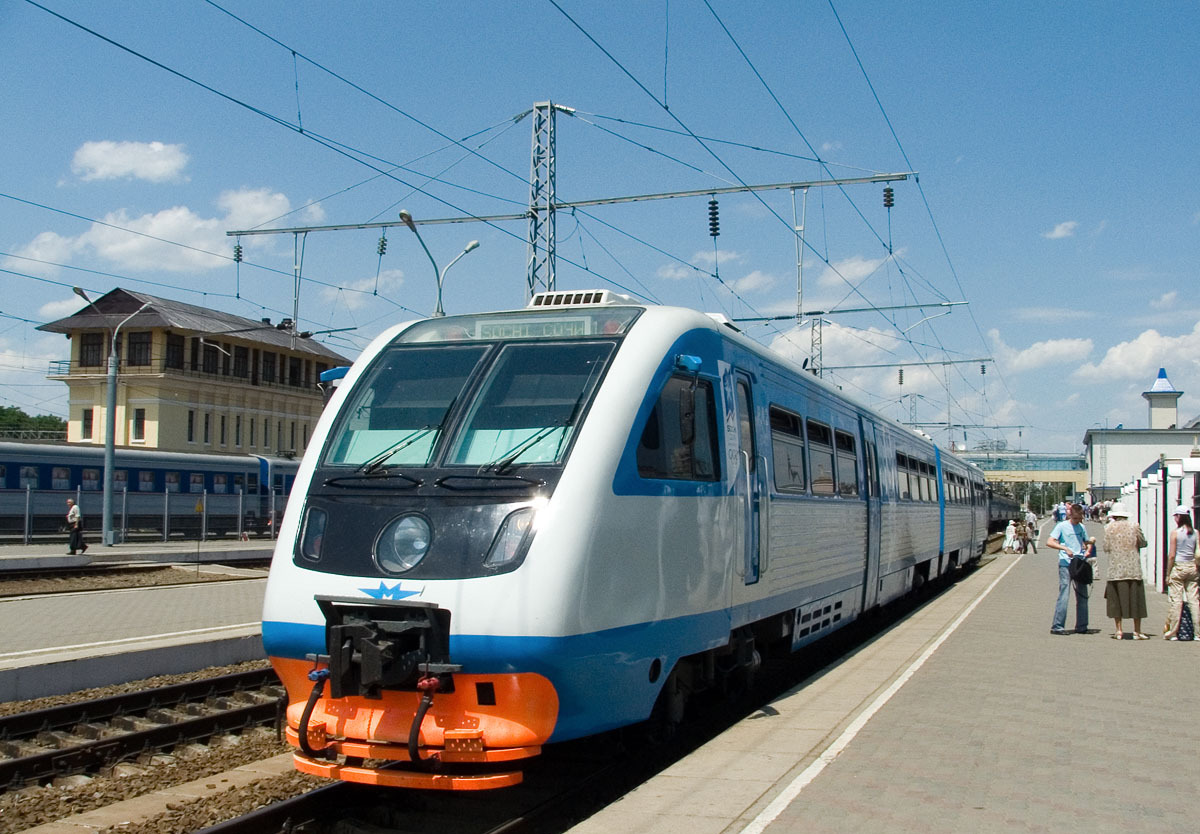
RA2-0014

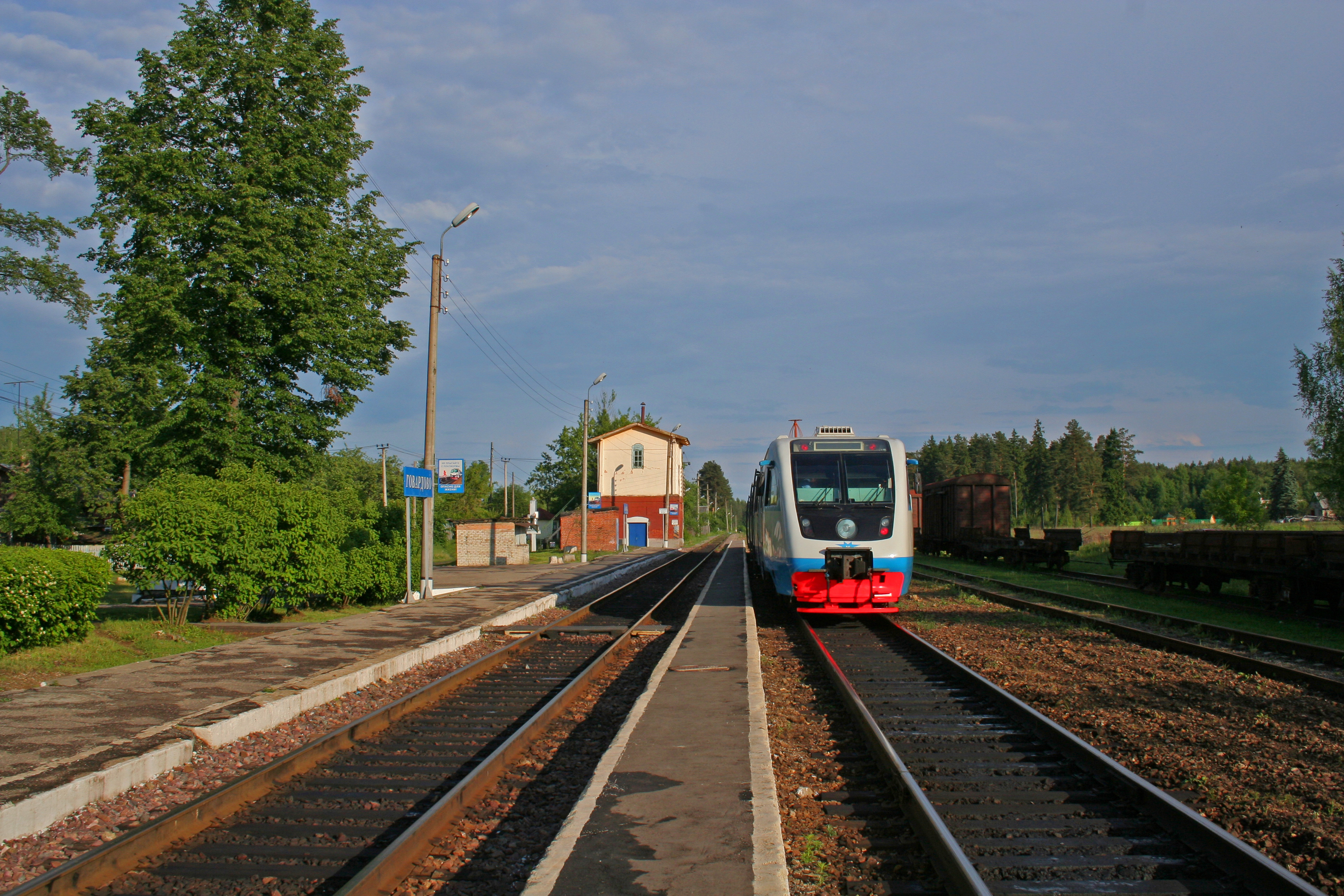
RA2 at Govardovo station, Kaluga Oblast

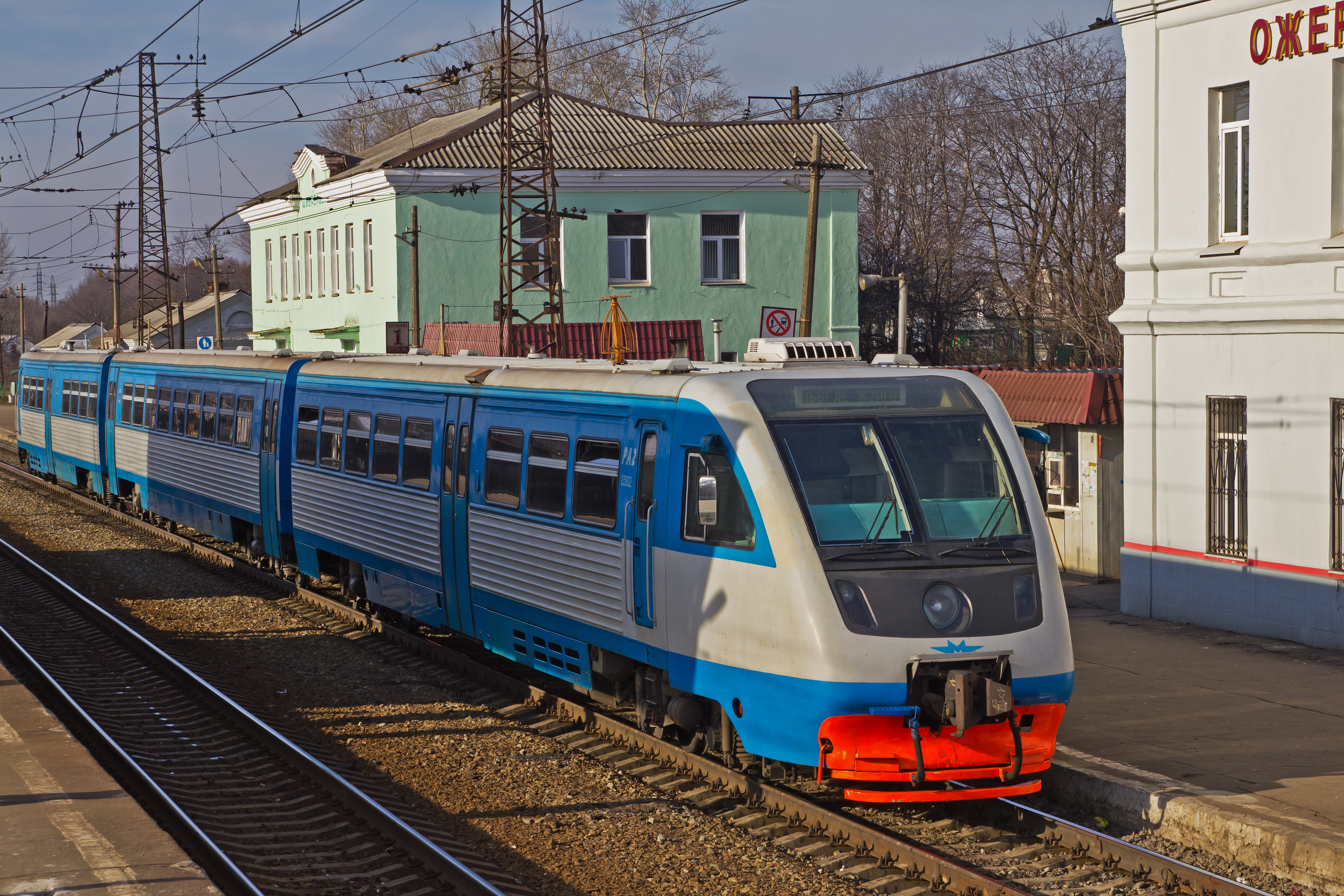
RA2 at Ozherelye station

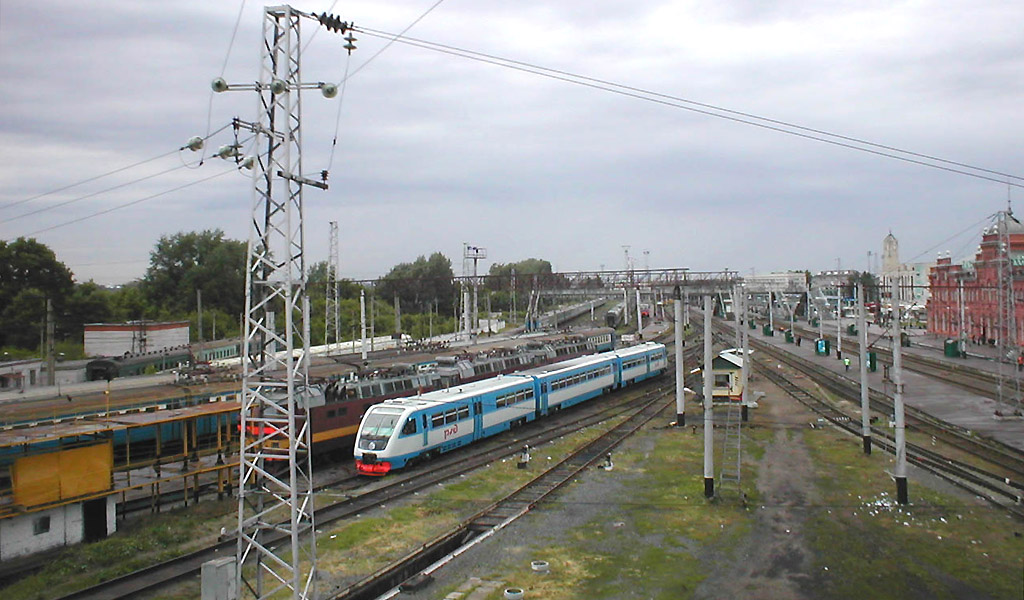
3-car RA2 at Kazan

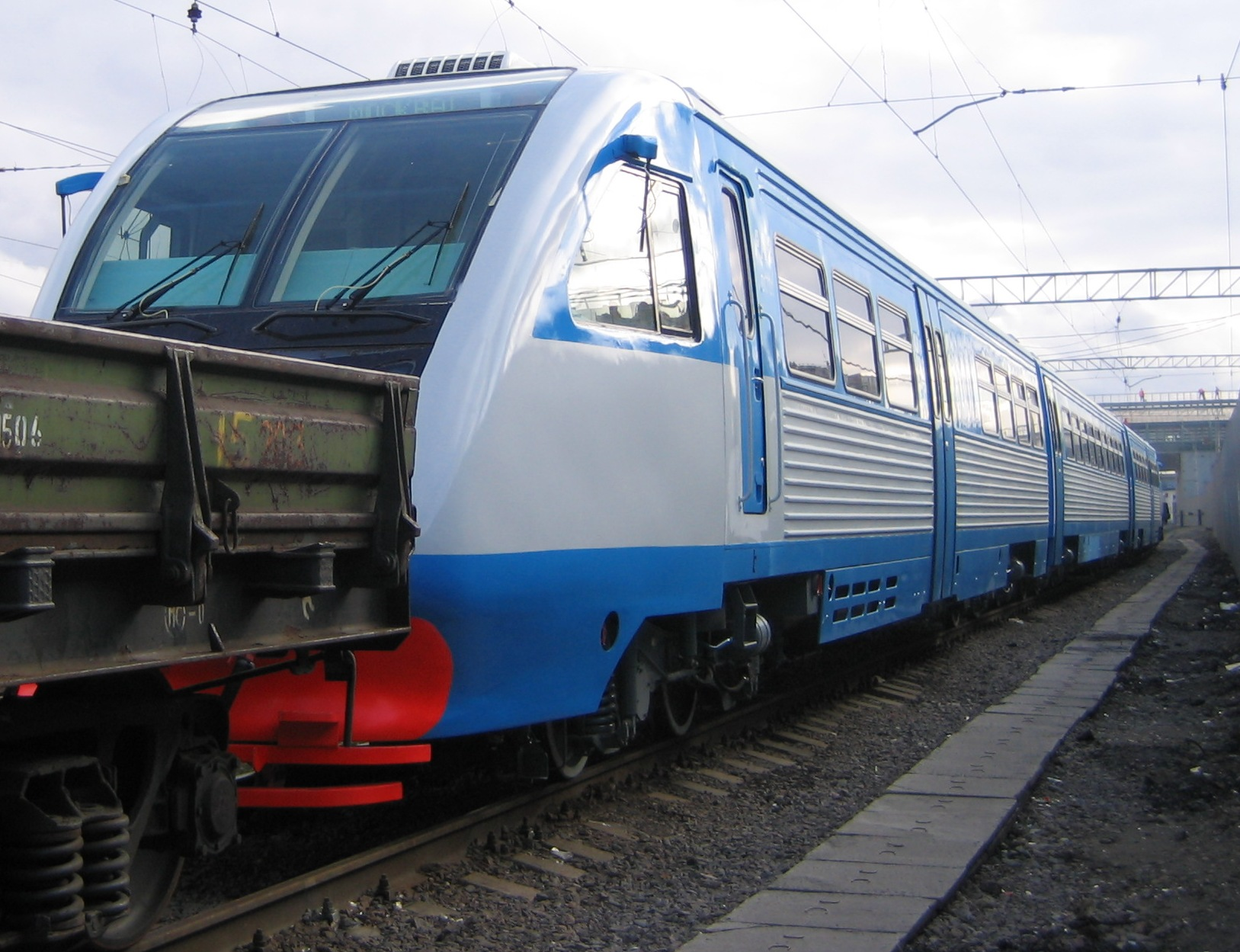
RA-2 at Mytischi railway station, Moscow region, Russia.

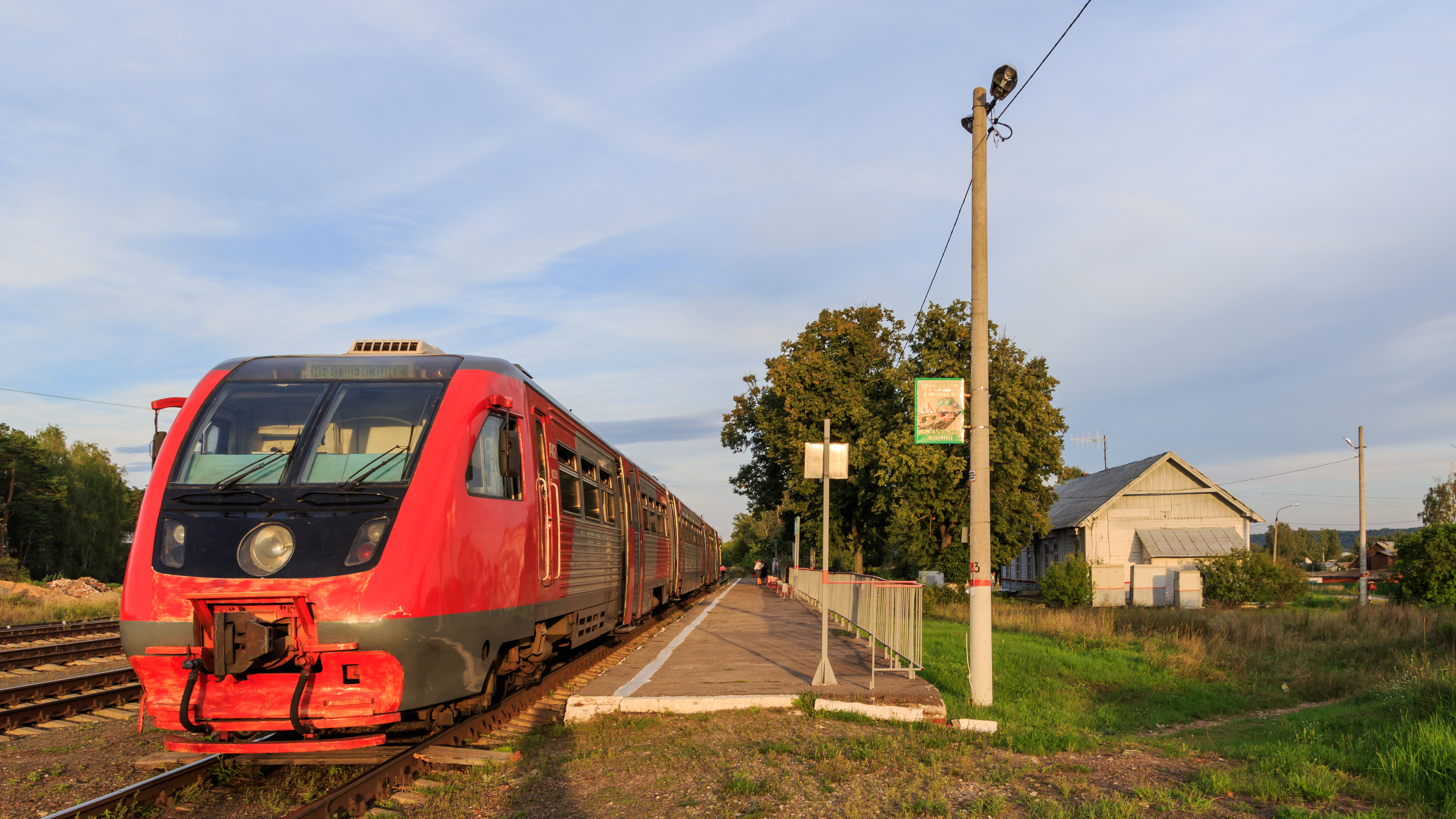
Red-coloured RA2 in Ozyory, Moscow region

== See also ==
- The Museum of the Moscow Railway
- DT1
